= Nakhon Lampang railway station =

Railway station in Sop Tui, Thailand

Nakhon Lampang นครลำปาง
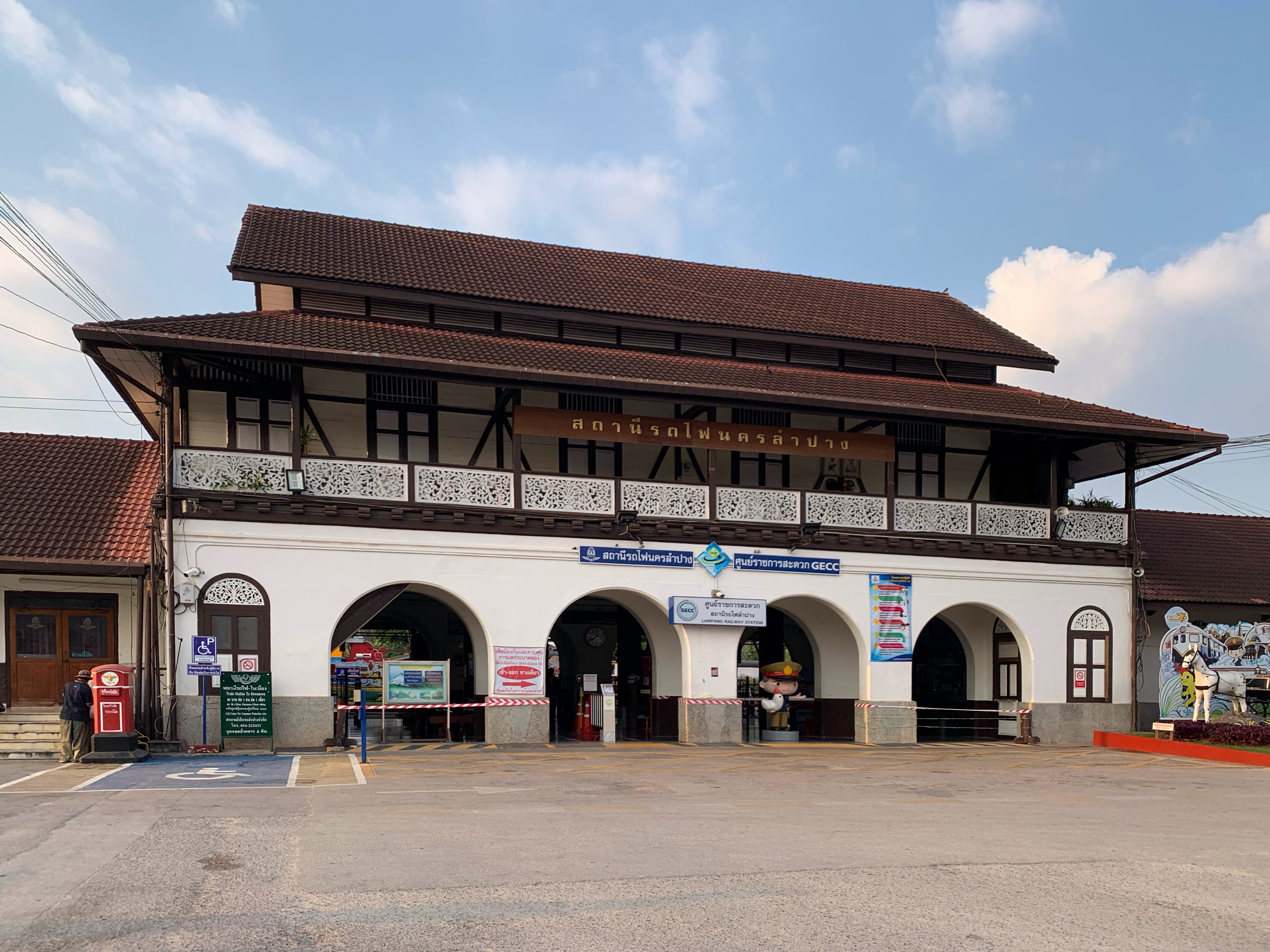

General information
- Other names: Lampang
- Location: Sop Tui Subdistrict, Lampang; Lampang Province; Thailand
- Coordinates: 18°16′44″N 99°28′24″E
- Operator: State Railway of Thailand
- Manager: Ministry of Transport
- Line: Chiang Mai Main Line
- Platforms: 2
- Tracks: 6

Construction
- Structure type: At-grade
- Parking: Yes

Other information
- Station code: ลป.

History
- Opened: 1 April 1916

Services
Preceding station	State Railway of Thailand	Following station
Nong Wua Thao towards Hua Lamphong or Krung Thep Aphiwat	Northern Line	Hang Chat towards Chiang Mai
Location

Nakhon Lampang railway station is a railway station in Sop Tui Subdistrict, Mueang Lampang District, Lampang Province. It is the main railway station for the province and is operated by the State Railway of Thailand (SRT). The station is on the Northern Line, 642 kilometres (398.9 mi) from Bangkok railway station. The station was built around 1915 and was open for use after the first royal train arrived at Lampang station on 1 April 1916.

== Architecture ==
The station building was built in a mix of northern Thai-styled architecture and European architecture and has two floors. The upper floor is the office of the Lampang District Traffic Department, and the lower floor is the station office. The balcony fence of the upper floor, door frames, and windows are decorated, and the entrance to the lower hall and ticket office have curved entrances.

Nakhon Lampang railway station has been well maintained over the years, retaining its many decorative features. The station received the Association of Siamese Architects' Architectural Conservation Award under the category of institutional and public structures in 1993.

In front of the station on display is steam locomotive no. 728 and a fountain. There is also a horse rickshaw stop as well.

== Annual event ==
Every April, there is a commemorative event to celebrate the railway's history and horse rickshaws, a symbol of Lampang.

== Places nearby ==
- Wat Sri Rong Muang
- Bo Haeo Community

=== Bo Haeo Halt ===
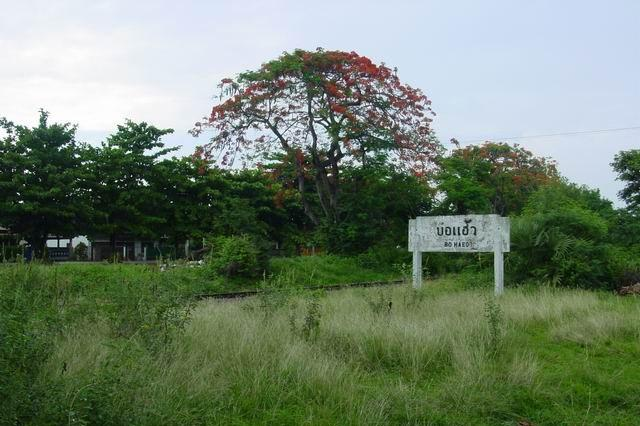
Bo Haeo Halt

Bo Haeo Railway Halt was a halt operated by the State Railway of Thailand, in Bo Haeo Subdistrict, Mueang Lampang District. It used to be between Nakhon Lampang and Hang Chat railway stations. The halt is 642 kilometres (398.9 mi) from Bangkok railway station and was regularly used in the past, until it was closed due plummeting usage between the community and the city.

== Gallery ==
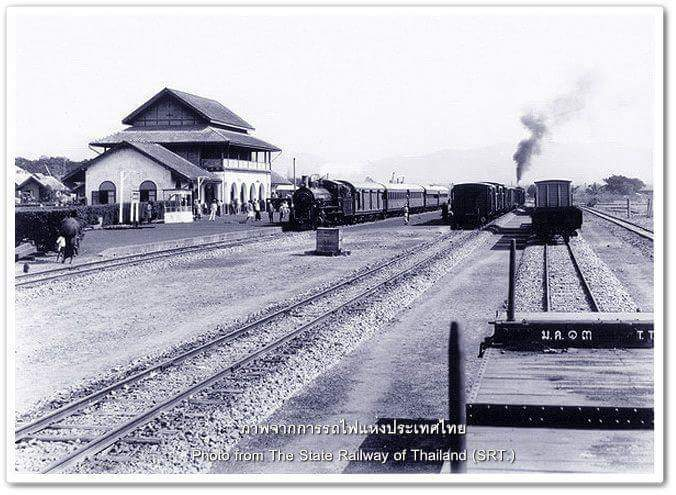
Nakhon Lampang in the early 1900s

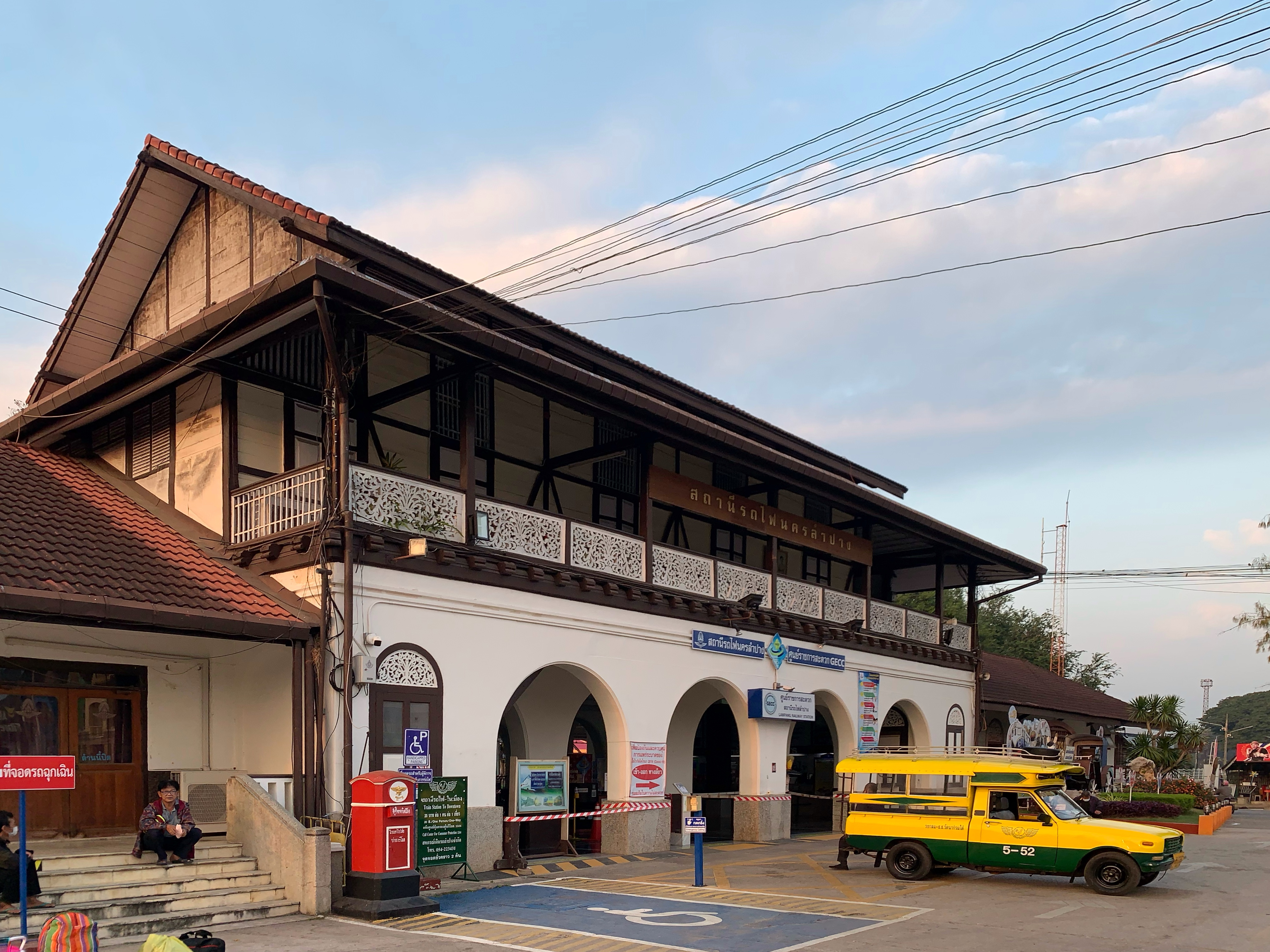
The front facade of the station building

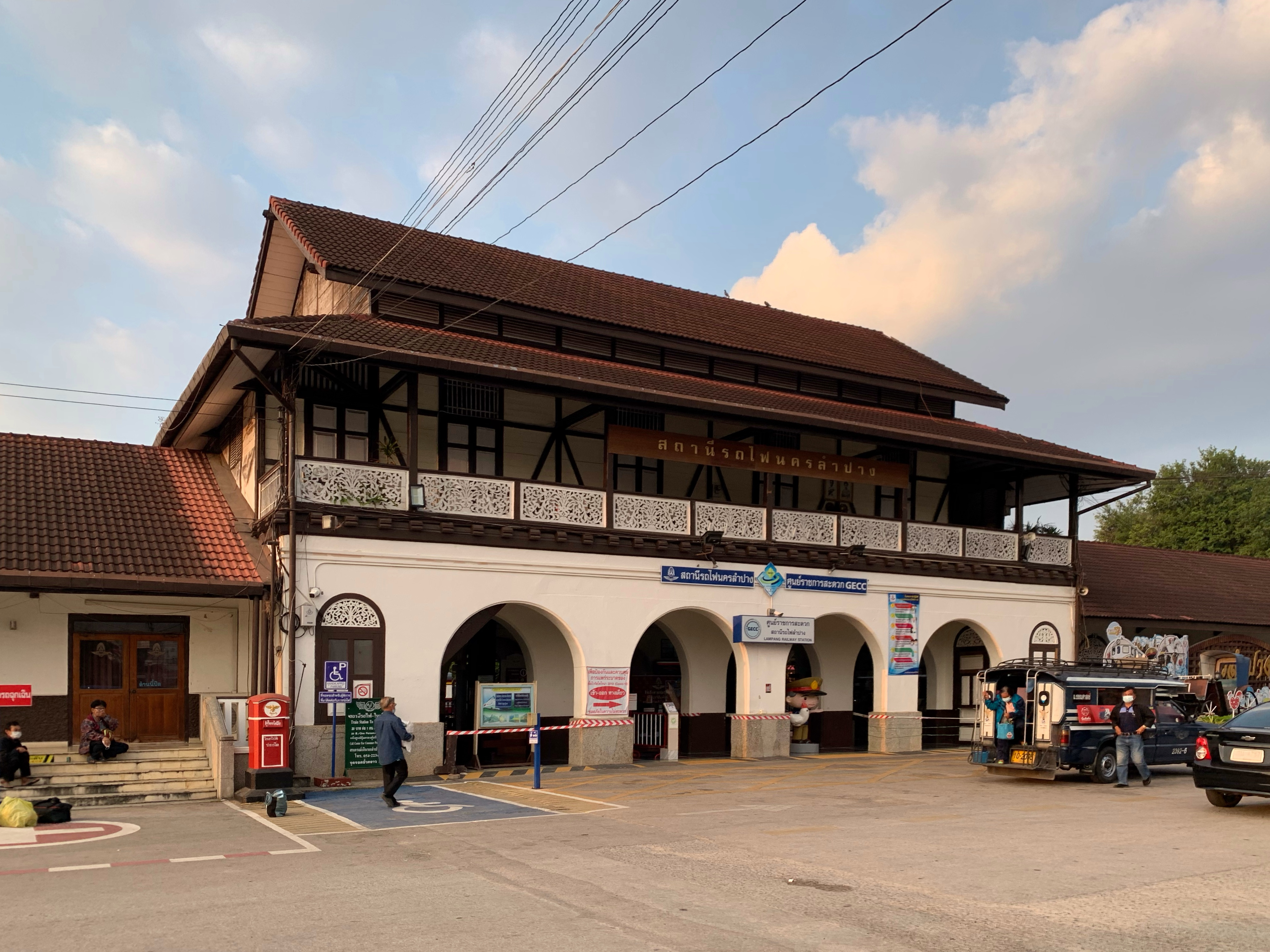
The front facade of the station building

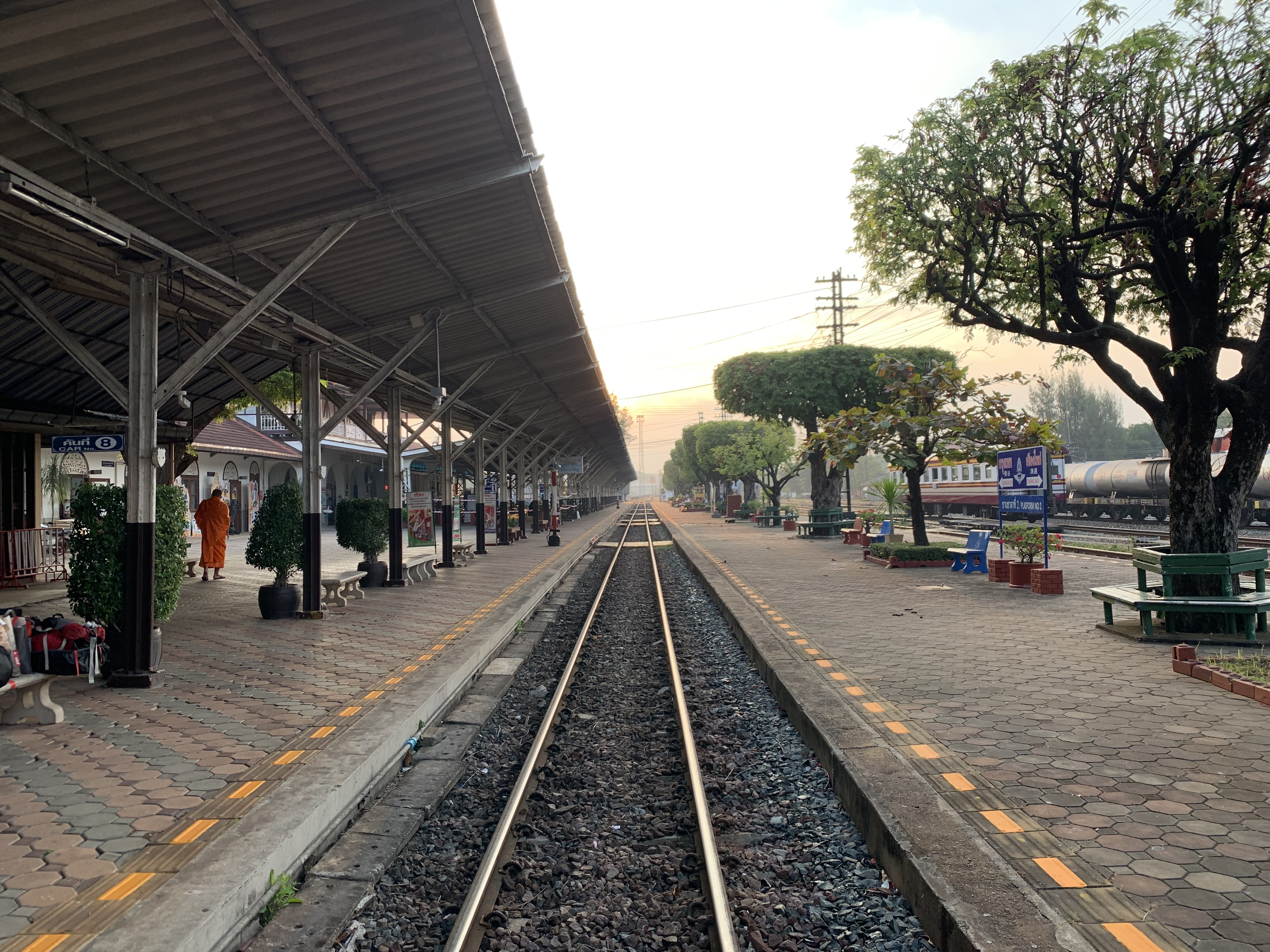
Platform towards Bangkok

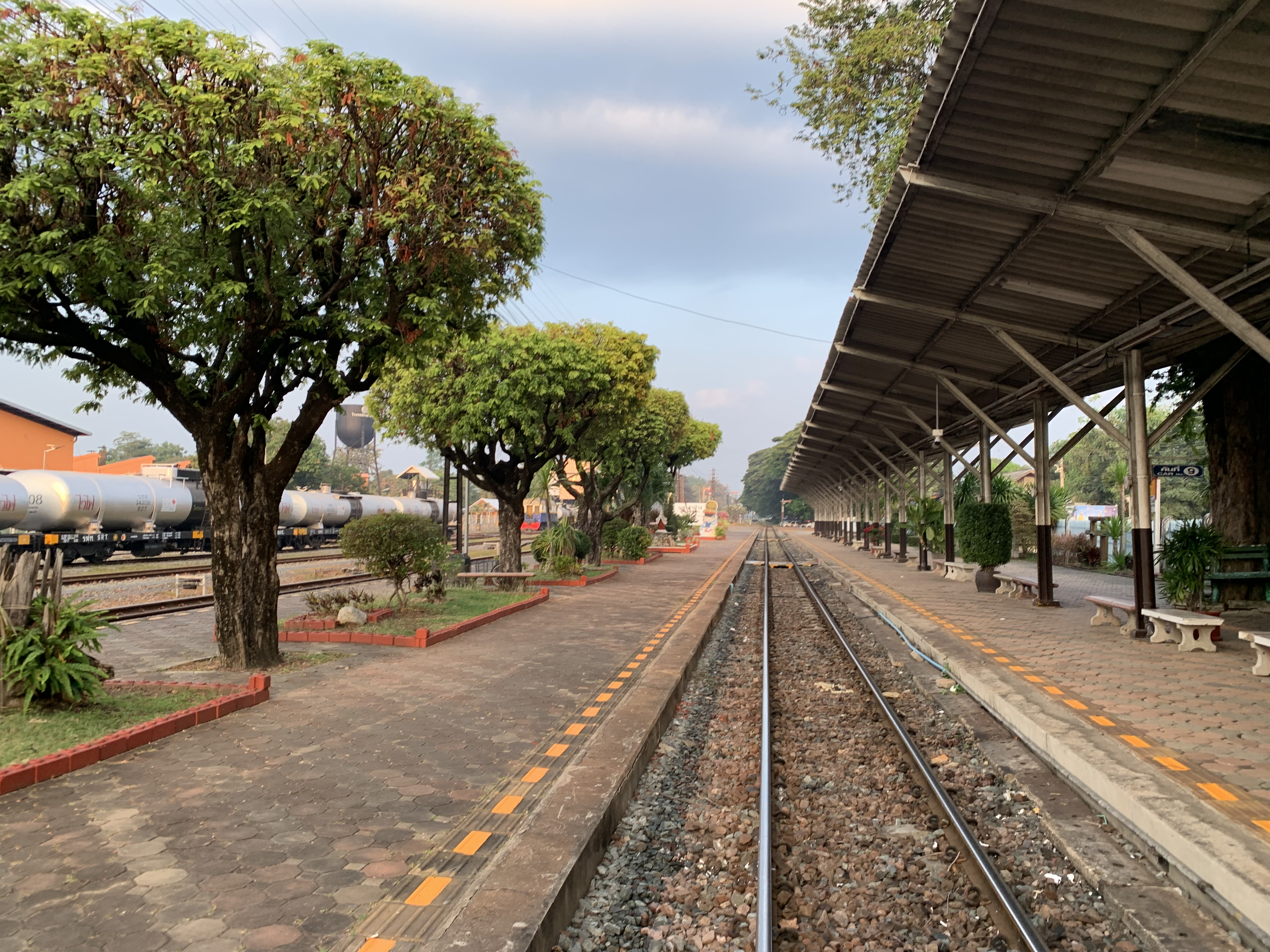
Platform towards Chiang Mai

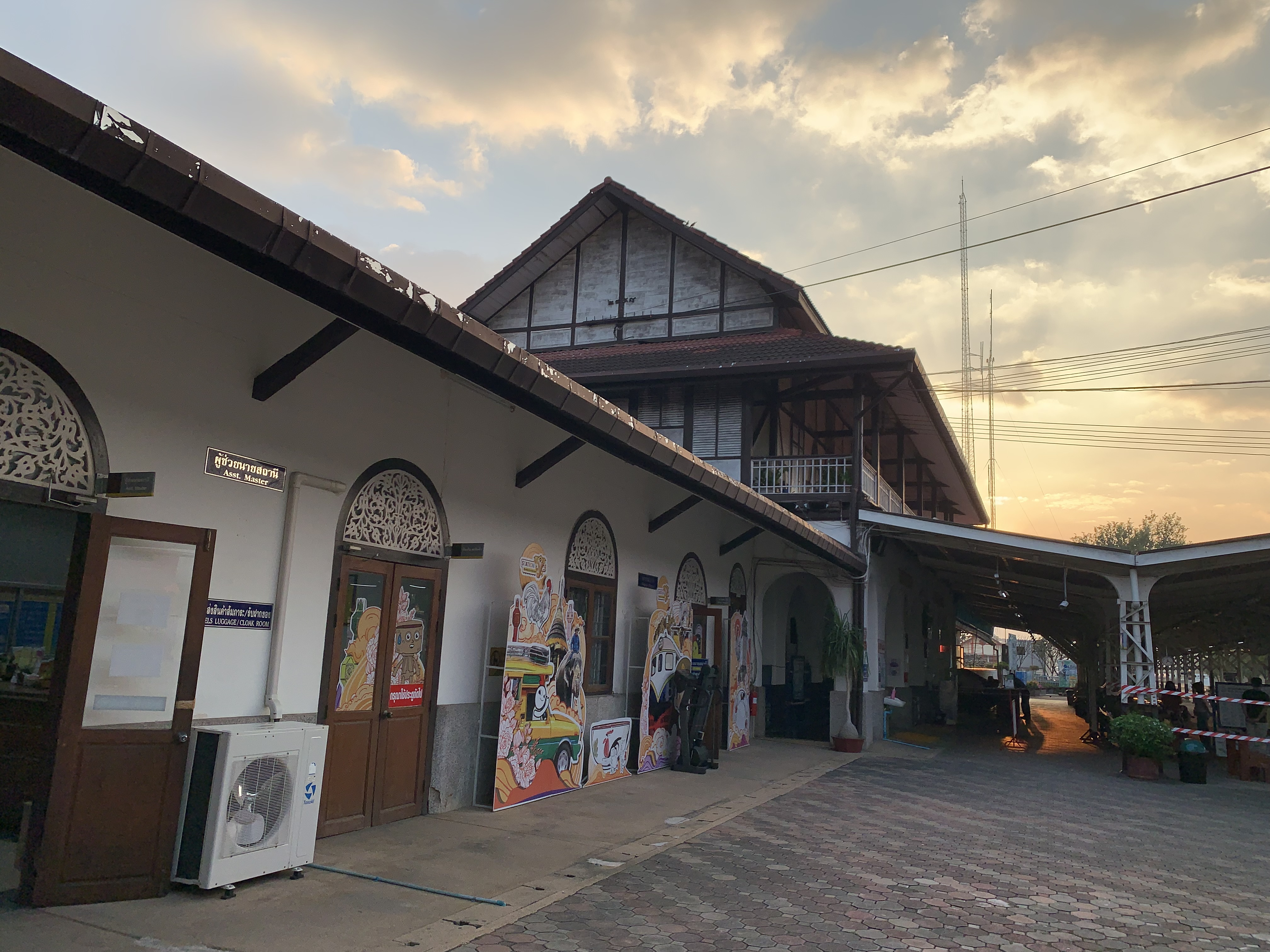
Side facade of the station building seen from the platforms

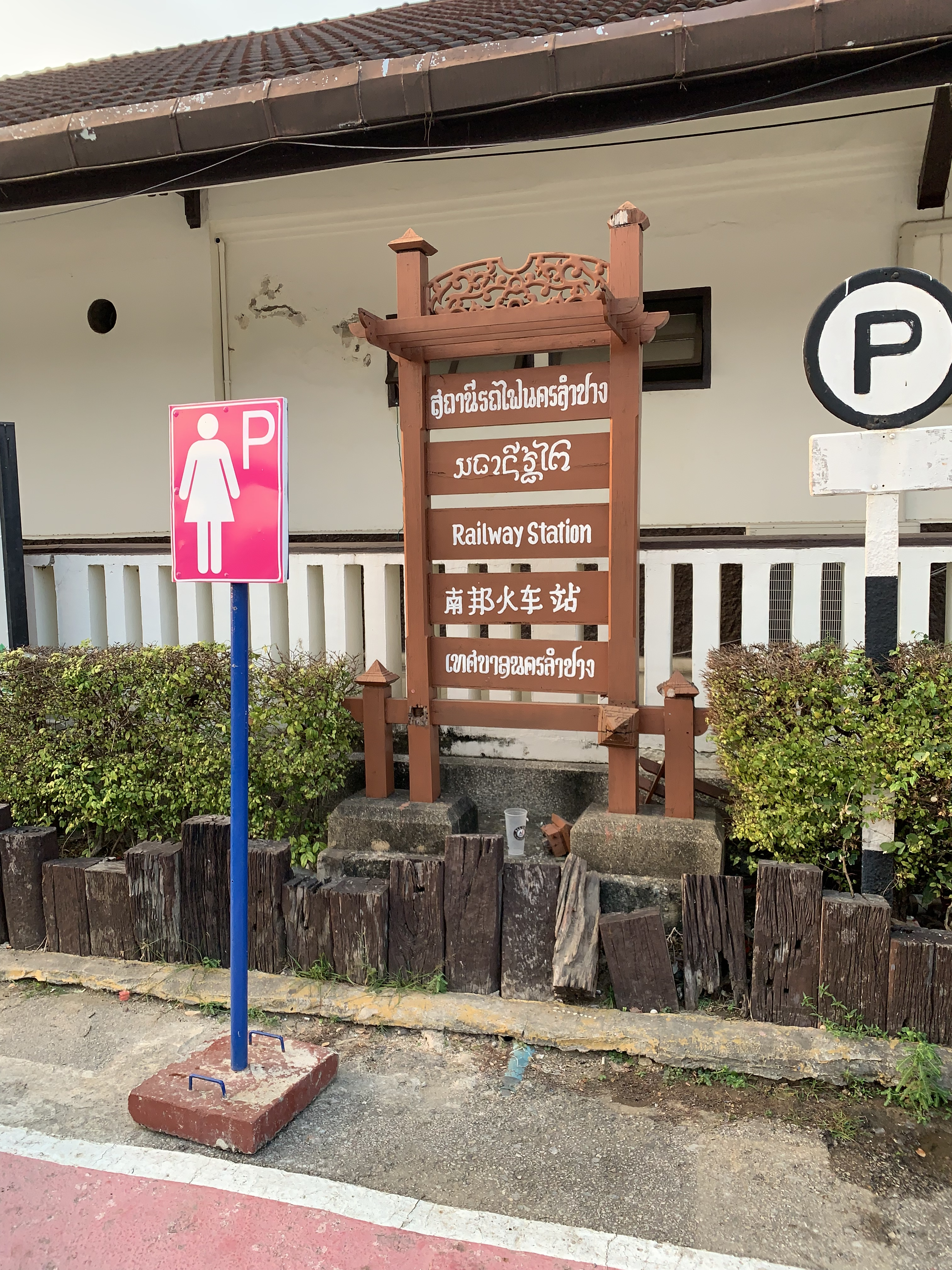
Station sign in various languages and female-only parking sign

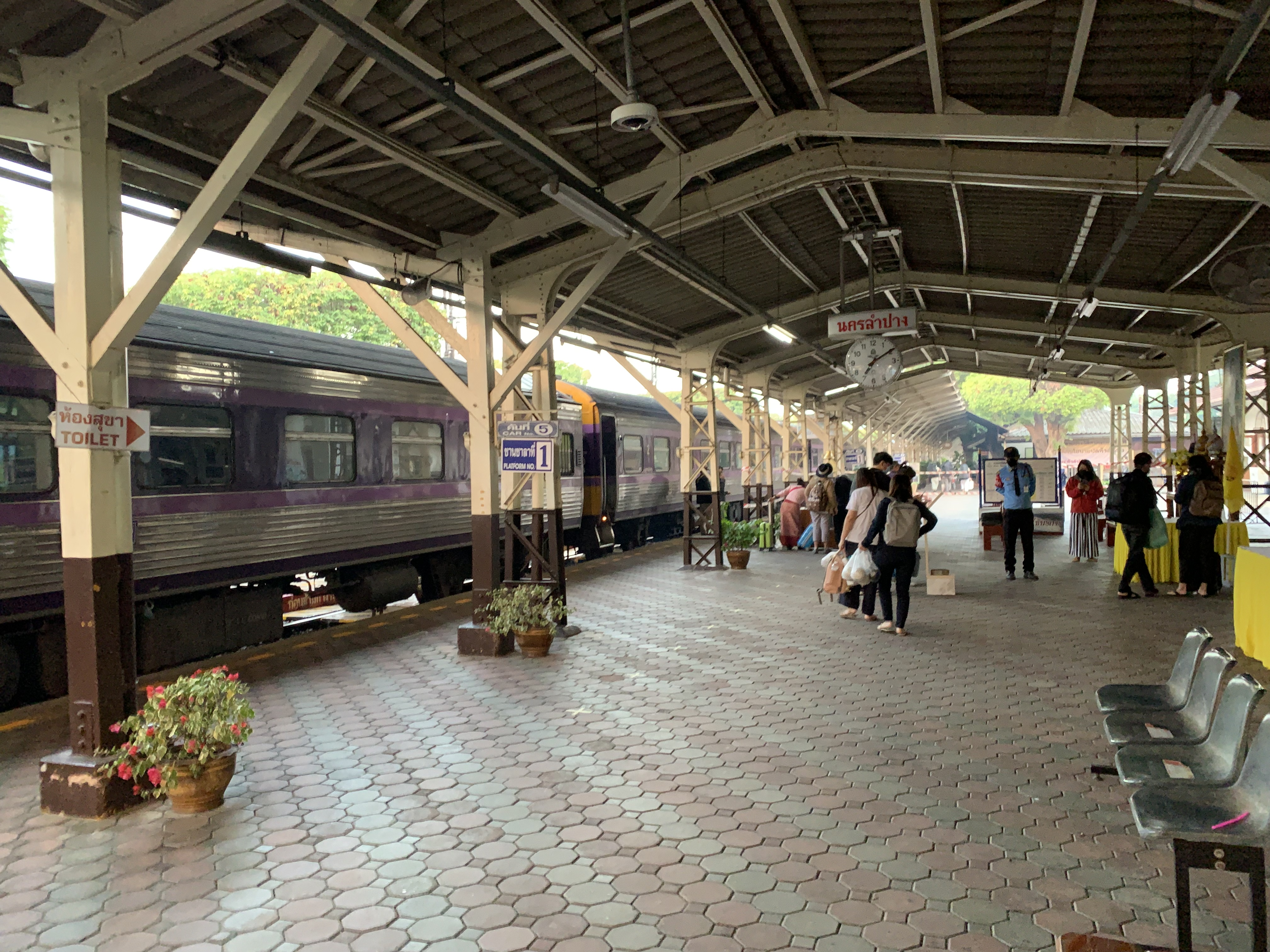
Platform with a train arriving from Bangkok
