= Mae Tan Noi railway station =

Railway station in Wiang Tan, Thailand

Coordinates: 18.4040°N 99.2624°E

Mae Tan Noi แม่ตานน้อย
- Station in 2026

General information
- Location: Mu 8 (Ban Mae Tan Noi), Wiang Tan Subdistrict, Hang Chat District, Lampang
- Owner: State Railway of Thailand
- Line: Northern Line
- Platforms: 1
- Tracks: 2

Other information
- Station code: มต.

Services
Preceding station	State Railway of Thailand	Following station
Huai Rian Halt towards Hua Lamphong or Krung Thep Aphiwat	Northern Line	Khun Tan towards Chiang Mai
Location

Mae Tan Noi railway station is a railway station located in Wiang Tan Subdistrict, Hang Chat District, Lampang. It is a class 3 railway station located 671.808 km (417.4 mi) from Bangkok railway station. Between Khun Tan and Mae Tan Noi, the railway crosses 3 bridges: Composite, Sam Ho and Song Ho bridges (from Mae Tan Noi respectively), then the Khun Tan Tunnel before arriving at Khun Tan station.

== Gallery ==
Station building
