= Wat Si Rong Muang =

Coordinates: 18.2906°N 99.4808°E

- วัดศรีรองเมือง

Religion
- Affiliation: Theravada Buddhism

Location
- Location: Sop Tui, Mueang Lampang district, Lampang province, Thailand
- Country: Thailand
- Interactive map of Wat Si Rong Muang

Architecture
- Type: Buddhist temple
- Style: Burmese and Shan
- Established: 1904

Wat Si Rong Muang (Thai: วัดศรีรองเมือง), also spelled Wat Si Rong Mueang, is a Buddhist temple in Lampang, Thailand. Its main vihara is built in the Burmese and Shan architectural styles.

== History ==
Wat Si Rong Muang was built in 1904, during the reign of King Chulalongkorn (Rama V). At that time, Lampang was an important centre of the teak trade. The temple was built by Phor Thao Chong Taka Intha (พ่อเฒ่าจองตะก่าอินต๊ะ), a wealthy Shan man who worked in the timber trade. Burmese and Shan people involved in the timber trade also helped build the temple.

According to a local account, the temple was built as a place for prayer and to ask forgiveness from nature for cutting down trees.

The temple was formerly known as Wat Tha Khrao Noi Burma (วัดท่าคราวน้อยพม่า). It was also called Wat Si Song Muang (วัดศรีสองเมือง). The name is said to have come from the surname of the people who donated the land. A local account states that a monastic residence called Samnak Song Si Song Muang had existed on the site since 1891.

Inscriptions at the temple record several dates. One inscription mentions the beginning of construction in 1905. Another records lacquer decoration in 1908, while a third is dated 1912.

The temple originally had a main vihara and nine smaller viharns. The smaller buildings later fell into ruin, leaving the main vihara as the surviving historic building.

The Fine Arts Department registered the vihara as a historic site on 27 October 1981.

== Architecture ==
The main vihara is a two-storey building made of brick, plaster and wood. The lower floor is built of brick and plaster, while the upper floor is mainly wooden. Its architecture combines Burmese and Shan styles.

The roof has several tiers and nine pointed finials. The gables and eaves have carved wooden and metal decorations. Inside the vihara are carved wooden ceiling panels and large round wooden pillars decorated with lacquer, gilding and coloured glass.

The pillars in front of the main Buddha image have decorations showing people, guardian figures, animals and plants. The ceiling has floral and animal designs made with lacquer and coloured glass.

The main Buddha image is in the Burmese style. Another Buddha image inside the vihara is in the Lanna style.
