= When Elephants Were Young =

- Official festival release poster
- Directed by: Patricia Sims
- Written by: Patricia Sims, Michael Clark
- Produced by: Patricia Sims
- Narrated by: William Shatner
- Cinematography: Michael Clark
- Edited by: Michael Clark
- Music by: Bruce Fowler
- Production company: Canazwest Pictures
- Distributed by: 20 Year Media; Emerging Pictures
- Release date: December 5, 2015 (Whistler Film Festival)
- Running time: 86 minutes
- Country: Canada
- Language: English

When Elephants Were Young is a 2015 Canadian documentary film directed by World Elephant Day Co-founder Patricia Sims and narrated by William Shatner. It follows the story of Wok and his young elephant Nong Mai, as they street beg in Bangkok until the opportunity comes to release the elephant to the wild. The film premiered at the Whistler Film Festival on December 5, 2015.

== Synopsis ==
William Shatner narrates this story of a young man and his young elephant living together in Thailand. Twenty-six-year-old Wok has been caring for Nong Mai since she was three. Nong Mai is one of 35 captive elephants in Wok's village in north-eastern Thailand. The traditions of elephant keeping have been passed down from generation to generation, but they are quickly fading in the modern world.

Wok is Nong Mai's mahout, her keeper. Their tender bond reveals a complex relationship - most elephants in Thailand live with humans, despite their wild and potentially dangerous nature. Although it's illegal to street beg with elephants in Thailand, Wok and his family need the money. Mired in debt, street begging with Nong Mai has become the family business.

Leaving his village, Wok wanders the streets of Bangkok with Nong Mai, day after day, peddling sugar cane to people who want to feed the elephant. But only a few buy; many shun him. People increasingly believe that elephants do not belong in the city, in captivity, but should be in the wild, free. Some even scold him for dragging an elephant into the city, despite the poverty and lack of opportunity that cause the elephant business to persist.

The film explores the central role that elephants play in Thai culture - elephants have been ingrained in traditions and spirituality for thousands of years. Yet today, Asian elephants are facing extinction: they are an endangered species, with fewer than 45,000 Asian elephants left on earth. Most elephants in Thailand are forced into the $40-billion-a-year tourism trade. The film explains that illegal tusks are smuggled into the country, making Thailand one of the biggest markets for the global ivory trade. It also describes how the growing human population continues to trespass into elephant habitats. A century ago, more than 100,000 elephants roamed freely in Thailand's lush forests. Today, only 4,000 remain - 2,800 of which are captive.

The film shows how an organization in Thailand is fighting to change the fate of captive elephants: the Elephant Reintroduction Foundation releases them into vast, protected, wild forest habitats within Thailand that are off-limits to humans. This organization makes an offer to purchase Nong Mai and reintroduce her to the wild. Separating Nong Mai from Wok isn't easy - she is part of their family. Living without her will be like 'having no hands or feet,' according to Wok. But he can no longer make a living from street begging. The challenges of keeping Nong Mai in his rural village are too difficult. Wok must let her go.

The opportunity for Nong Mai's survival demonstrates a successful conservation model that shows, despite imminent threats to the survival of Asian elephants, a happy ending for one may offer hope for all.

== Development ==
The film was shot in Thailand, over the course of five years, by director Patricia Sims and cinematographer Michael Clark. They followed Wok and Nong Mai street begging in Bangkok, and filmed Nong Mai in the Sublangka wildlife sanctuary after her release. The filmmakers were almost killed in a dramatic car accident in 2014, when their vehicle was struck and plunged over a mountainside - fortunately, all survived their injuries.

== Release ==
After its World Premiere at the Whistler Film Festival, the film had its Hometown Premiere at the Victoria Film Festival. The film had its U.S. and International Premiere at the Palm Beach International Film Festival in April 2016, where it won Best Documentary Feature, and will be theatrically released in August 2016.

== Soundtrack ==
The film's soundtrack includes songs by Kate Bush/Placebo, Yusuf Islam/Cat Stevens, cellist Jami Sieber, Chris Caddell and the Wreckage, and Geoff Callaghan and The Schopenhauer Incident. The original music score is composed by Bruce Fowler.

The album Acoustic for Elephants, released December 2015, features songs from the film's soundtrack and all proceeds go to the annual World Elephant Day campaign.
