= Pang Muang railway station =

Railway station in Hang Chat, Thailand

Coordinates: 18.3359°N 99.3693°E

Pang Muang ปางม่วง
- Station in 2026

General information
- Location: Mu 9 (Ban Pang Muang), Hang Chat Subdistrict, Hang Chat District, Lampang
- Owner: State Railway of Thailand
- Line: Northern Line
- Platforms: 1
- Tracks: 2

Other information
- Station code: ปม.

Services
Preceding station	State Railway of Thailand	Following station
Hang Chat towards Hua Lamphong or Krung Thep Aphiwat	Northern Line	Huai Rian Halt towards Chiang Mai
Location

Pang Muang railway station is a railway station located in Hang Chat Subdistrict, Hang Chat District, Lampang. It is a class 3 railway station located 660.988 km (410.7 mi) from Bangkok railway station. This is the last station before climbing the Khun Tan range.

== Gallery ==
Current station building

Site of the old station, north of the current station. The old platform is still visible.
