= Hang Chat railway station =

Railway station located in Hang Chat District, Lampang, Thailand

Coordinates: 18.3359°N 99.3693°E

Hang Chat ห้างฉัตร
- Station in 2026

General information
- Location: Mu 4, Hang Chat Subdistrict, Hang Chat District, Lampang
- Owner: State Railway of Thailand
- Line: Northern Line
- Platforms: 1
- Tracks: 3

Other information
- Station code: หฉ.

History
- Former names: Hang Sat

Services
Preceding station	State Railway of Thailand	Following station
Nakhon Lampang towards Hua Lamphong or Krung Thep Aphiwat	Northern Line	Pang Muang towards Chiang Mai
Location

Hang Chat railway station is a railway station located in Hang Chat Subdistrict, Hang Chat District, Lampang. It is a class 3 railway station located 654.859 km from Bangkok railway station.

== Gallery ==
Station building
