= Chomphu =

Chomphu may refer to:

- Chomphu, Lampang
- Chomphu, Phitsanulok
