= Ban Sadet =

Ban Sadet บ้านเสด็จ
- Tambon
- Interactive map of Ban Sadet
- Coordinates: 18°23′25″N 99°37′08″E
- Country: Thailand
- Province: Lampang
- Amphoe: Mueang Lampang

Population (2020)
  - Total: 10,423
- Time zone: UTC+7 (TST)
- Postal code: 52000
- TIS 1099: 520110

Ban Sadet (Thai: บ้านเสด็จ) is a tambon (subdistrict) of Mueang Lampang District, in Lampang Province, Thailand. In 2020 it had a total population of 10,423 people.

== History ==
The subdistrict was created effective August 24, 1976 by splitting off 6 administrative villages from Ban Laeng.

== Administration ==
=== Central administration ===
The tambon is subdivided into 17 administrative villages (muban).

No.	Name	Thai
1.	Ban Sai Mun	บ้านทรายมูล
2.	Ban Cham Kha	บ้านจำค่า
3.	Ban Sai Thong	บ้านทรายทอง
4.	Ban Pong Om	บ้านปงอ้อม
5.	Ban Sadet	บ้านเสด็จ
6.	Ban Huai Yang	บ้านห้วยยาง
7.	Ban Huai Nam Khem	บ้านห้วยน้ำเค็ม
8.	Ban Lu Nuea	บ้านลูเหนือ
9.	Ban Lu Tai	บ้านลูใต้
10.	Ban Sai Thong Phatthana	บ้านทรายทองพัฒนา
11.	Ban Pong Chai	บ้านปงชัย
12.	Ban Mo Phatthana	บ้านเมาะพัฒนา
13.	Ban Sai Mun Phatthana	บ้านทรายมูลพัฒนา
14.	Ban Huai Yang Phatthana	บ้านห้วยยางพัฒนา
15.	Ban Huai Luang Phatthana	บ้านห้วยหลวงพัฒนา
16.	Ban Huai Duea Phatthana	บ้านห้วยเดื่อพัฒนา
17.	Ban Pong Chai Phatthana	บ้านปงชัยพัฒนา

=== Local administration ===
The whole area of the subdistrict is covered by the subdistrict administrative organization (SAO) Ban Sadet (องค์การบริหารส่วนตำบลบ้านเสด็จ).
