= Khelang Nakhon (town) =

Khelang Nakhon เขลางค์นคร
- Town Municipality
- Location in Thailand
- Coordinates: 18°17′45″N 99°29′32″E
- Country: Thailand
- Province: Lampang
- District: Mueang Lampang

Population (2014)
  - Total: 60,402
- Time zone: UTC+7 (ICT)
- Area code: (+66) 54

Khelang Nakhon (Thai: เขลางค์นคร) is a town (Thesaban Mueang) in the Mueang Lampang District (Amphoe) of Lampang Province in Northern Thailand. In 2014, it had a total population of 60,402 people.
