= Mae Tha district, Lamphun =

Mae Tha แม่ทา
- District
- District location in Lamphun province
- Coordinates: 18°27′43″N 99°8′5″E
- Country: Thailand
- Province: Lamphun
- Seat: Tha Sop Sao

Area
  - Total: 762.6 km^{2} (294.4 sq mi)

Population (2005)
  - Total: 40,361
  - Density: 52.9/km^{2} (137/sq mi)
- Time zone: UTC+7 (ICT)
- Postal code: 51140
- Geocode: 5102

Mae Tha (Thai: แม่ทา; IPA: [mɛ̂ː tʰāː]) is a district (amphoe) of Lamphun province, northern Thailand.

== Etymology ==
The district is named after the Mae Tha River.

== History ==
The minor district (king amphoe) Mae Tha was established in 1939, when it was split off from Mueang Lamphun district. It was upgraded to a full district on 22 July 1958.

== Geography ==
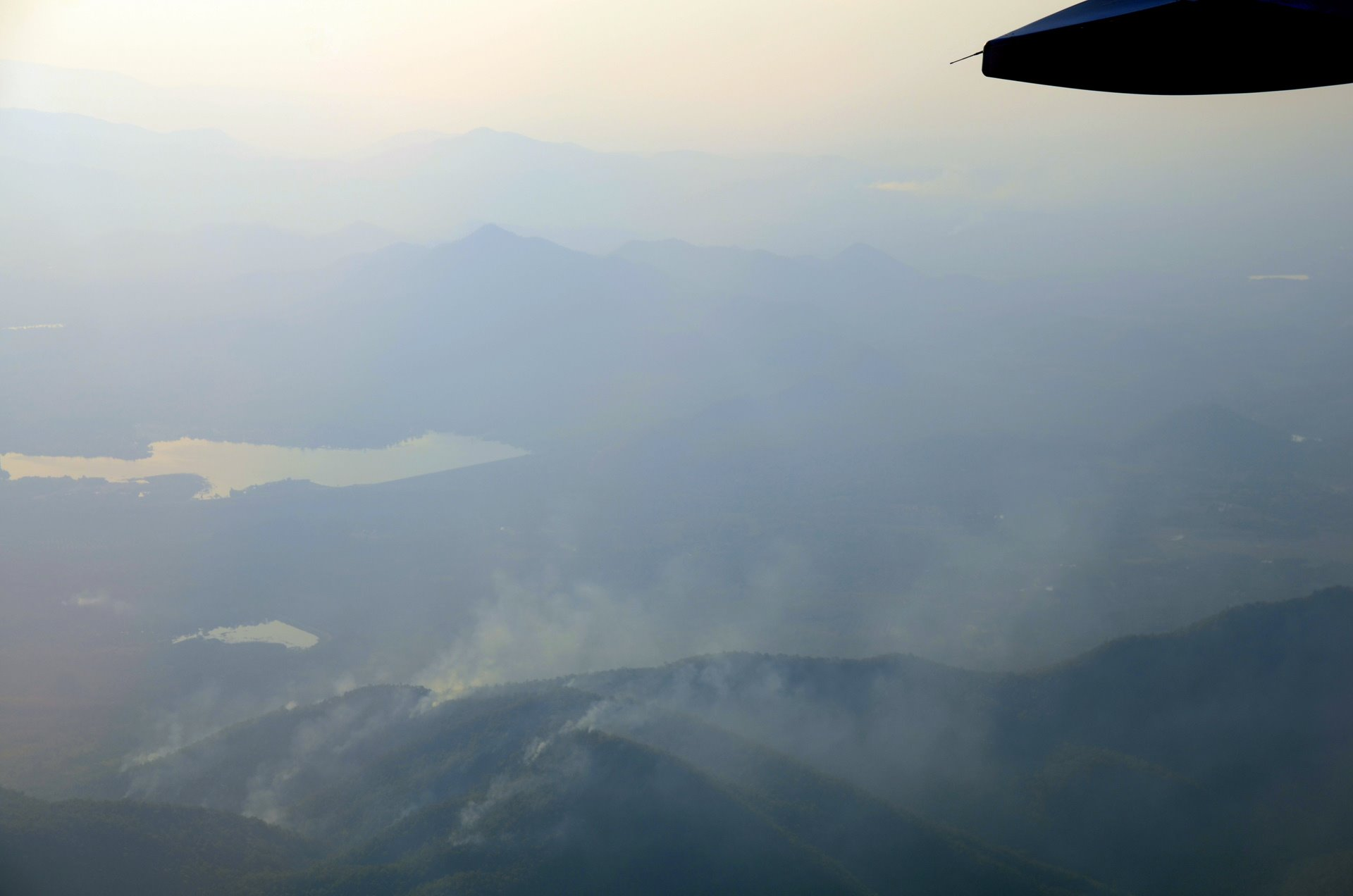
Mountain forests in northern Thailand, such as here in Mae Tha District, are set on fire every year at the end of the dry season by farmers

Neighboring districts are (from the south clockwise): Thung Hua Chang, Ban Hong, Pa Sang and Mueang Lamphun of Lamphun Province, Mae On of Chiang Mai province, Mueang Lampang, Hang Chat and Soem Ngam of Lampang province.

The Khun Tan Range stretches from north to south along the district.

== Administration ==
The district is divided into six sub-districts (tambons), which are further subdivided into 68 villages (mubans). There are two townships (thesaban tambons): Tha Sop Sao covers parts of tambon Tha Sop Sao, and Tha Kat parts of tambon Tha Kat and Tha Khum Ngoen. There are a further six tambon administrative organizations (TAO).

No.	Name	Thai name	Villages	Pop.
1.	Tha Pla Duk	ทาปลาดุก	14	7,594
2.	Tha Sop Sao	ทาสบเส้า	16	10,883
3.	Tha Kat	ทากาศ	15	8,004
4.	Tha Khum Ngoen	ทาขุมเงิน	11	6,858
5.	Tha Thung Luang	ทาทุ่งหลวง	6	3,990
6.	Tha Mae Lop	ทาแม่ลอบ	6	3,032
