= Ban Pao =

Ban Pao may refer to:

- Ban Pao, Mae Taeng, Chiang Mai
- Ban Pao, Lampang
