= Huai Rian railway halt =

Railway stop in Wiang Tan, Thailand

Huai Rian ห้วยเรียน
- Railway halt in 2026

General information
- Location: Mu 7 (Ban Huai Rian), Wiang Tan Subdistrict, Hang Chat District, Lampang
- Coordinates: 18°22′15″N 99°17′44″E
- Owner: State Railway of Thailand
- Line: Northern Line

Other information
- Station code: ยเ.

Services
Preceding station	State Railway of Thailand	Following station
Pang Muang towards Hua Lamphong or Krung Thep Aphiwat	Northern Line	Mae Tan Noi towards Chiang Mai
Location

Huai Rian Railway Halt is a railway halt located in Wiang Tan Subdistrict, Hang Chat District, Lampang, Thailand. It is located 665.09 km (413.3 mi) from Bangkok Railway Station.
