= Nikhom Phatthana =

Nikhom Phatthana may refer to:

- Nikhom Phatthana District
- Nikhom Phatthana Subdistrict, Nong Bua Lamphu
- Nikhom Phatthana Subdistrict, Lampang
- Nikhom Phatthana Subdistrict, Phitsanulok
- Nikhom Phatthana Subdistrict, Rayong
- Nikhom Phatthana Subdistrict, Satun
- Nikhom Phatthana Subdistrict, Sisaket
