= Ton Thong Chai =

Coordinates: 18.3375°N 99.5334°E

Ton Thong Chai ต้นธงชัย
- Subdistrict
- Interactive map of Ton Thong Chai
- Country: Thailand
- Province: Lampang
- District: Mueang Lampang District

Population (2005)
  - Total: 15,093
- Time zone: UTC+7 (ICT)

Ton Thong Chai (Thai: ต้นธงชัย) is a village and tambon (subdistrict) of Mueang Lampang District, in Lampang Province, Thailand. In 2005 it had a population of 15,093 people. It contains 13 villages.
