= Elephants in Thailand =

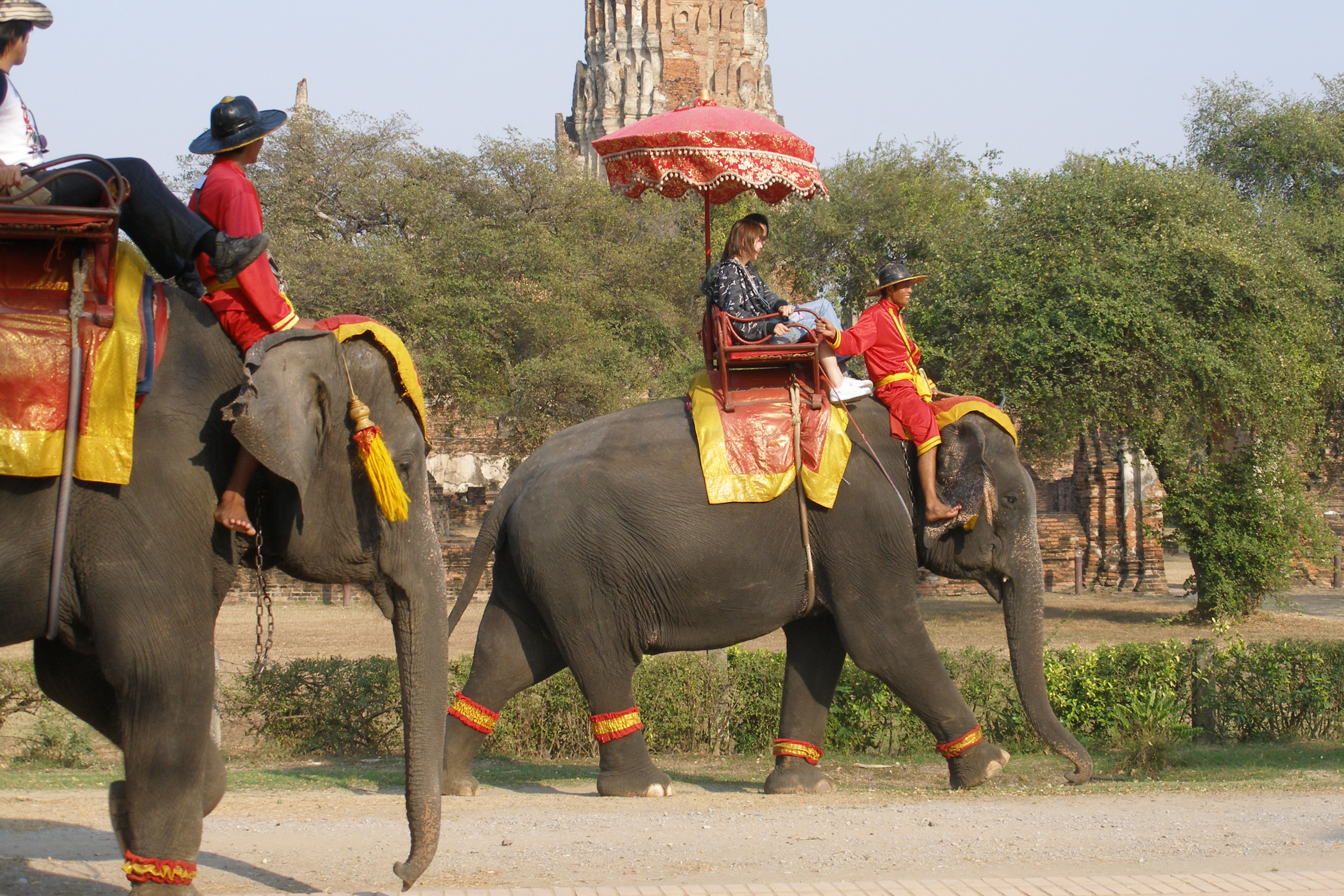
Elephants in Ayutthaya

The elephant has been a contributor to Thai society and its icon for many centuries. The elephant has had a considerable impact on Thai culture. The Thai elephant (Thai: ช้างไทย, chang Thai) is the official national animal of Thailand. The elephant found in Thailand is the Indian elephant (Elephas maximus indicus), a subspecies of the Asian elephant. In the early-20th century there were an estimated 100,000 captive elephants in Thailand. In mid-2007 there were an estimated 3,456 captive elephants left in Thailand and roughly a thousand wild elephants. By 2017, the number of captive elephants had risen to an estimated 3,783. The elephant became an endangered species in Thailand in 1986.

== Description ==
There are three species of elephant: two African species and the Asian elephant. Asian elephants are divided into four sub-species, Sri Lankan, Indian, Sumatran and Bornean. Thai elephants are classed as Indian elephants. However, Thai elephants have slight differences from other elephants of that sub-species. They are smaller, have shorter front legs, and a thicker body than their Indian counterparts.

Elephants are herbivores, consuming ripe bananas, leaves, bamboo, tree bark, and other fruits. Eating occupies 18 hours of an elephant's day. They eat 100-200 kilograms of food per day. A cow (female) will eat 5.6 percent of her body weight per day. A bull (male) will eat 4.8 percent. Thus a 3,000 kilogram cow will consume 168 kg per day, a 4,000 kg bull 192 kg per day. As elephants can digest only 40 percent of their daily intake, the result is dung amounting to 50–60 kg daily. As elephants will not eat in unclean surroundings befouled by their own dung and their instinct is to roam to a new area.

== Habitat ==
Due to their diet, the natural habitat of Thai elephants are in tropical forests which are found in the northern and western parts of Thailand: Mae Hong Son, Chumphon, and the border near Burma (Huai Kha Khaeng Wildlife Sanctuary, Erawan Falls National Park), Petchabun range, Dangrek Range, and peninsular Thailand (Ranong, and Trang). Each elephant requires an area of at least 100 km^{2} to ensure sufficient food.

Thailand formerly was 90 percent forested. Illegal logging and agriculture has reduced forest cover dramatically. Forest cover shrank to 31.6 percent in 2015. In 1961 forests are estimated to have covered 273,628 km^{2}. By 2011, forests had dwindled to only 171,586 km^{2}. This has meant death to the Thai elephant, resulting in the plummeting numbers of the animal, placing them on the endangered species list.

On Elephant Day 2017, the Department of National Parks announced that the number of wild elephants was rising 7-10 percent. Areas that had seen the most marked increase in wild elephants were the western forest in Thungyai Naresuan Wildlife Sanctuary and the eastern forest in Dong Phayayen-Khao Yai forest complex.

== History ==
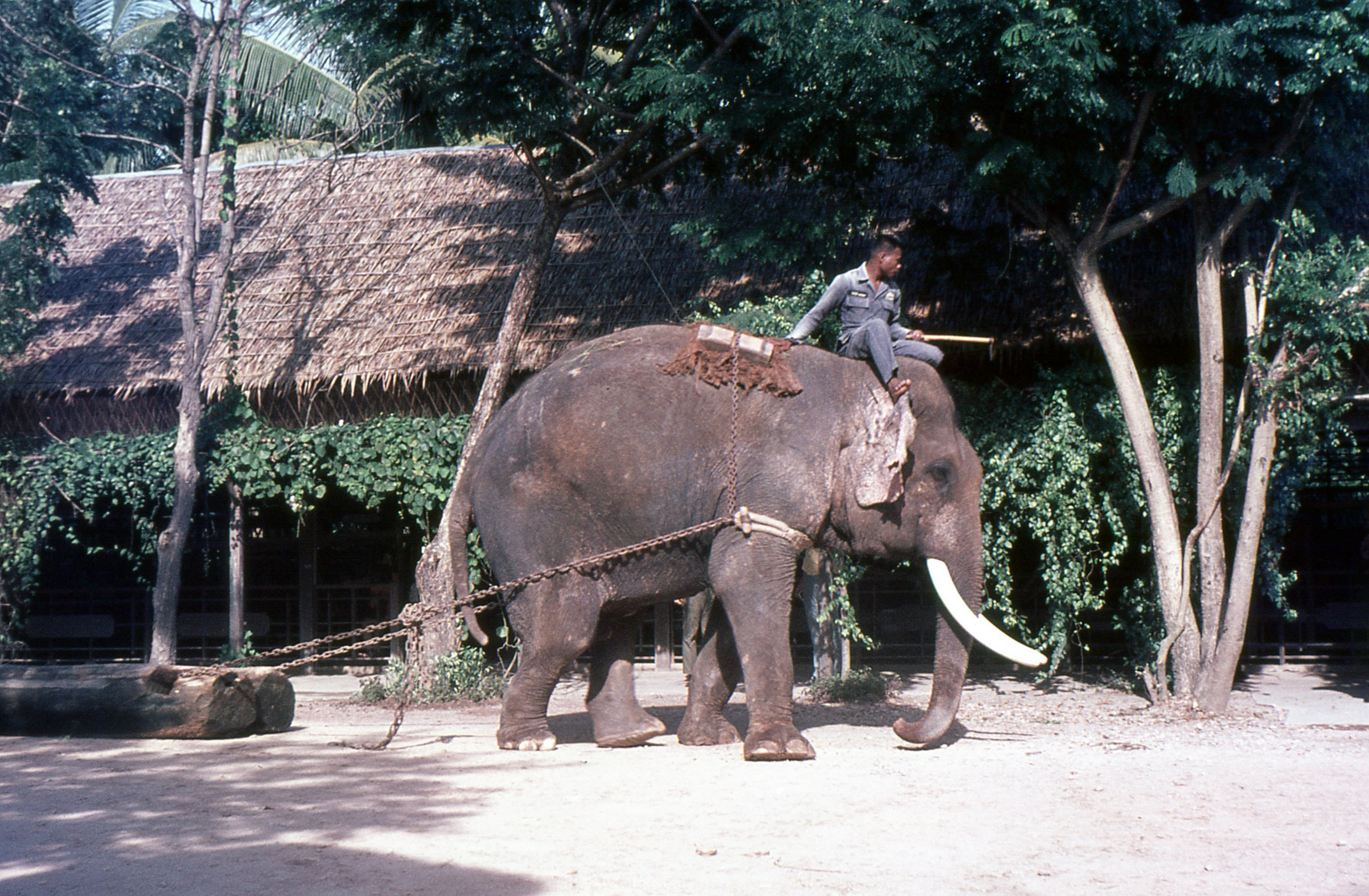
Mahout on the back of elephant towing logs

In Thai society elephants have played a substantial role in manual labour, war, royal iconography, and the tourism industry. For thousands of years, elephants were captured and trained to be a form of transport and heavy labour. When logging in Thailand was still legal, they hauled heavy logs through forests, which in turn gave many Thai people jobs. In recorded Thai history, during the reign of King Ramkhamhaeng the Great of Sukhothai, Thais used to hunt and trade elephants.

Known for their strength and intelligence, elephants were used as war elephants since the days of Alexander the Great. They were referred to as warm-blooded armoured tanks. Each elephant has a distinctive personality. Male elephants that were aggressive but considered "tameable" were selected to be war elephants.

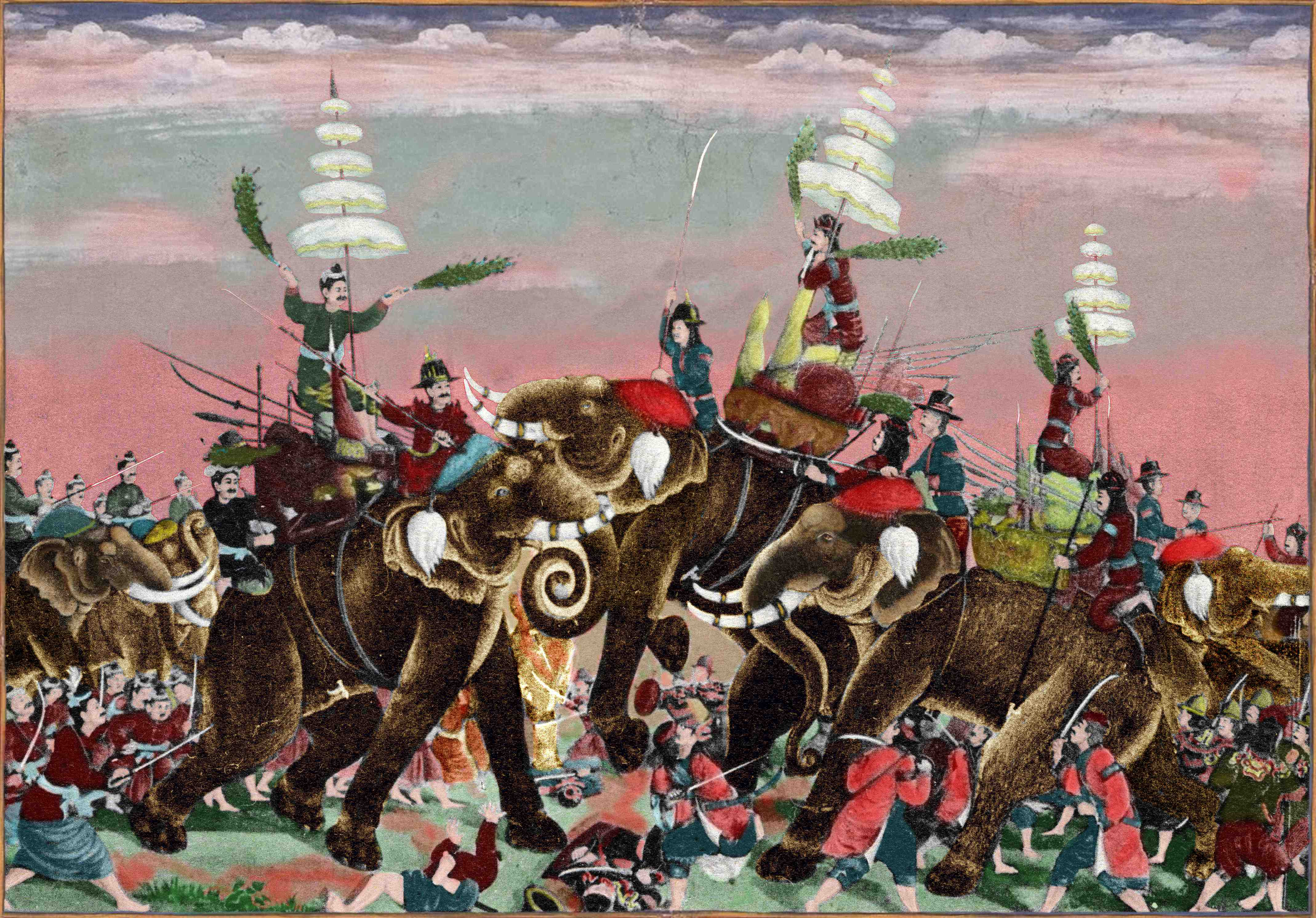
Elephant duel between Siam and Burma

Thai royals and elephants established a relationship over thousands of years. The first recorded Thai elephant was in the stone inscription of King Ramkhamhaeng the Great of Sukhothai. In this inscription he mentioned being nineteen and said his elephant, Bekhpon, advanced their attack on Khun Sam Chon to protect his father, while his father's soldiers fled in fear. Chao Praya Prabhongsawadee was the elephant of King Naresuan of Thailand that came out triumphant in the elephant duel (Thai: ยุทธหัตถี) between the King of Burma and King Naresuan during the war with the Burmese. For a very long time, it was a law that when a white elephant was found and a tradition that when an elephant with good build was found, it was to be presented as property to the King of Thailand. The Thai sacred and royal symbol was the white elephant (chang pueak or chang samkan). They are not albinos but are genetically different. White elephants are not white, they are a dusky pinkish grey. Phra Savet Adulyadej Pahon was a white elephant that belonged to Thailand's King Bhumibol Adulyadej.

== Exploitation ==
Logging was banned in Thailand in 1989. Logging had been the primary occupation of Thai elephants and their mahouts. After the ban, elephants trainers had to find other ways to feed themselves and their elephants. Most of them turned to the entertainment industry and tourism. Many mahouts took their elephants to Bangkok, roaming the streets with baskets of fruits for the tourists to buy and feed the animal. Elephants now had to beg for food and perform tricks or act as party props in exchange for money.

On 17 June 2010, elephant protection laws were passed making these acts illegal. An Asian Elephant Range States Meeting in 2017 estimated the number of captive elephants in Thailand at 3,783. The Department of Livestock Development says that some 223 elephant camps exist in the country. They fall into three categories: camps for observation purposes only; non-riding camps that allow other activities; and elephant riding camps.

== Laws ==
King Vajiravudh (Rama VI) in 1921 decreed in the Wild Elephant Protection Act that all wild elephants were the property of the government, to be managed by the Department of the Interior as the King's representative. Elephants with special features—white elephants—were to be presented to the king.

The law pertaining to captive elephants is the Beast of Burden Act 2482 B.E. (1939). This act classifies elephants as draught animals along with horses, donkeys, and oxen. It allows domesticated elephants to be treated as private property. This act has no additional measures for animal welfare protection although it is prohibited to kill an elephant, even a dangerous or charging one. The Wild Animal Reservation and Protection Act, B.E. 2535 (1992) protects wild elephants, but excludes registered draught animals.

== Preservation and conflict ==
Logging both legal and illicit — destroyed much of the elephants' natural habitat which resulted in a plunge in the number of elephants in Thailand. The National Elephant Institute is the only organization that is government-owned; there are also NGOs contributing to elephant conservation. They have a schedule of elephant shows which are not harmful or tiring for the elephants. But according to World Animal Protection, "A true elephant-friendly venue would be purely observational for visitors,..." The organisation has published a list of the elephant venues with the best treatment of elephants.

The Centre of Elephant and Wildlife Research has conducted scientific studies to ensure welfare of Thailand's domestic population will be scientifically informed rather than emotionally based. One study Elephants in the observation only program had higher stress hormone levels (fecal glucocorticoid metabolites) compared to elephants that participated in other types of work. The elephant in the observation program might get higher stress hormones from being bored, no exercise, and feeling unsafe because of attacks by other elephants. The same study found, longer durations of work and longer distance and time of walking were associated with lower stress hormones.

Human-elephant conflicts seem to have escalated since about 2000. Between 2012 and 2018 there were 107 elephant or human casualties—death or injury—due to increased confrontation. At least 25 wild elephants died during this six-year period, most from electrocution by live wires strung by farmers to keep elephants from their crops. Over the same period, 45 humans have been killed by wild elephants. Conflicts are most intense in Chachoengsao, Chantaburi, Prachinburi, and Kanchanaburi. Besides electric fencing, efforts to keep elephants at bay have included tree barriers; burning tires; loud noise from sirens, firecrackers, and radios; vinegar-chili infused fences; and bees.

The global coronavirus pandemic in 2019–20, halted the country's tourism industry and left nearly 4,000 elephants at risk of starvation; their owners cannot afford to feed them without revenue generated by the tourism industry. Owners have sold their animals to zoos or bartered them to the illegal logging business.

== Cultural significance ==
Historically, elephants in Thailand are considered to be very important culturally. There are many elephant's references to artworks, literature and national emblems. As Thailand is a majority Buddhist country, elephants are portrayed as sacred animals from their special symbolism in the practice of Buddhism. Many artworks in Thai royal palaces and temples have drawings of elephants on the paintings on the walls. In 1917, Thailand's official flag was a white elephant in the middle of the scarlet background. White elephants in Thai society also represent wealth and power because of their past association with the Thai royals. The royal Thai navy flag also bears the symbol of the white elephant. Many provinces in Thailand used to have elephants as part of their official emblems as well. In the Thai animal and planetary zodiac, the elephant is the fourth animal zodiac of the Thai people.

Asian elephants share a close relationship with the Thai people, from being used warriors on battlefields, worshiped as religious icons, and faithful laborers to loggers. Environmental exploitation, massive landslides, and mudflows led the government to ban logging in Thailand in 1986. This led to almost 70% of domesticated elephants to be out of work. The Thai elephant has served as a mascot for the 1998 Asian Games and 2005 Asian Indoor Games.

== In provincial seals ==
Provincial seal	Thai Province	Description
Current province
	Bangkok	Indra rides Erawan elephant
	Chiang Rai Province	White elephant, cloud, and Naga border
	Chiang Mai Province	White elephant in glass palace
	Tak Province	King Naresuan pouring holy water on an elephant
	Mae Hong Son Province	Elephant playing in water
	Nakhon Nayok Province	Elephant with stalk of rice
	Suphan Buri Province	Elephant duel between King Naresuan and Mingyi Swa of Burma at Nhong Sarai sub-district, 1592
	Narathiwat Province	Sail bearing an elephant (Phra sri nara raja kirinee) wearing ornamentation
Former province
	Lan Chang Province	Herd of elephants in a large field

== See also ==
- Asian elephant
- Cultural depictions of elephants
- Ivory trade
- Khan Kluay
- Thai Elephant Orchestra
- White elephant
- War elephant
