= Tha Thung Luang =

Coordinates: 18.4281°N 99.0383°E

Tha Thung Luang ทาทุ่งหลวง
- Subdistrict
- Interactive map of Tha Thung Luang
- Country: Thailand
- Province: Lamphun
- District: Mae Tha District

Population (2005)
  - Total: 3,990
- Time zone: UTC+7 (ICT)

Tha Thung Luang (Thai: ทาทุ่งหลวง, pronounced [tʰāː tʰûŋ lǔa̯ŋ]) is a village and tambon (subdistrict) of Mae Tha District, in Lamphun Province, Thailand. In 2005 it had a population of 3990 people. The tambon contains six villages.
