= Tha Kat =

Coordinates: 18°25′1.9″N 99°1′0.8″E

Tha Kat ทากาศ
- Subdistrict
- Interactive map of Tha Kat
- Country: Thailand
- Province: Lamphun
- District: Mae Tha District

Population (2018)
  - Total: 7,679
- Time zone: UTC+7 (ICT)
- Thailand: 51170

Tha Kat (Thai: ทากาศ, pronounced [tʰāː kàːt]) is a village and tambon (subdistrict) of Mae Tha District, in Lamphun Province, Thailand. In 2005 it had a population of 8,004 people, but has gradually declined, and as of 2018 it had a population of 7,679. The tambon contains 15 villages.
