= Tha Mae Lop =

Tha Mae Lop ทาแม่ลอบ
- Subdistrict
- Country: Thailand
- Province: Lamphun
- District: Mae Tha District

Population (2005)
  - Total: 3,032
- Time zone: UTC+7 (ICT)

Tha Mae Lop (Thai: ทาแม่ลอบ, pronounced [tʰāː mɛ̂ː lɔ̂ːp]) is a village and tambon (subdistrict) of Mae Tha District, in Lamphun Province, Thailand. In 2005 it had a population of 3,032 people. The tambon contains six villages.
