= World Elephant Day =

Annual event on August 12

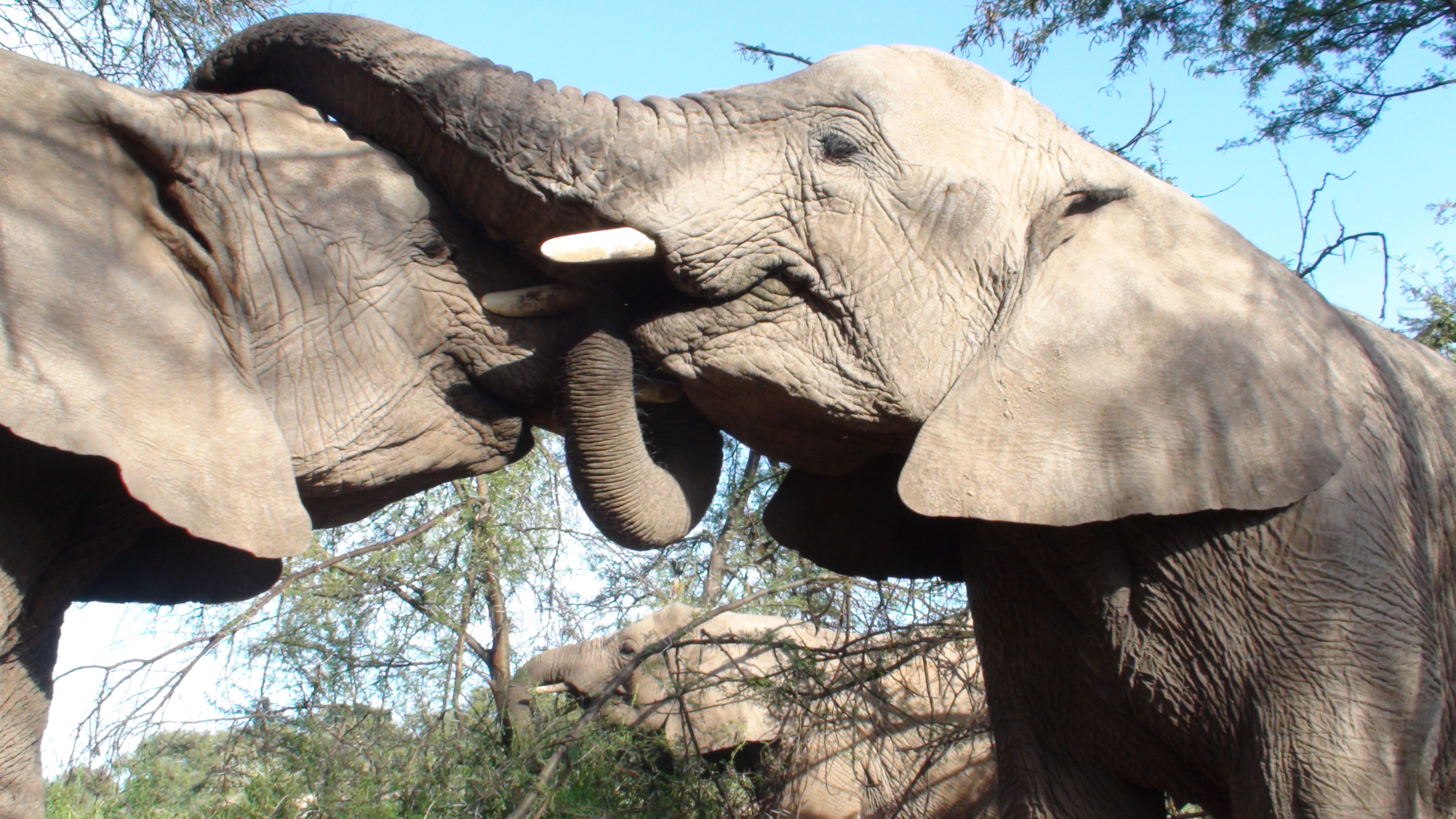
- Elephants
- Date: August 12
- Frequency: Annually
- Location: Worldwide
- Established: 12 August 2012
- Founder: Patricia Sims and the Elephant Reintroduction Foundation
- Website: worldelephantday.org

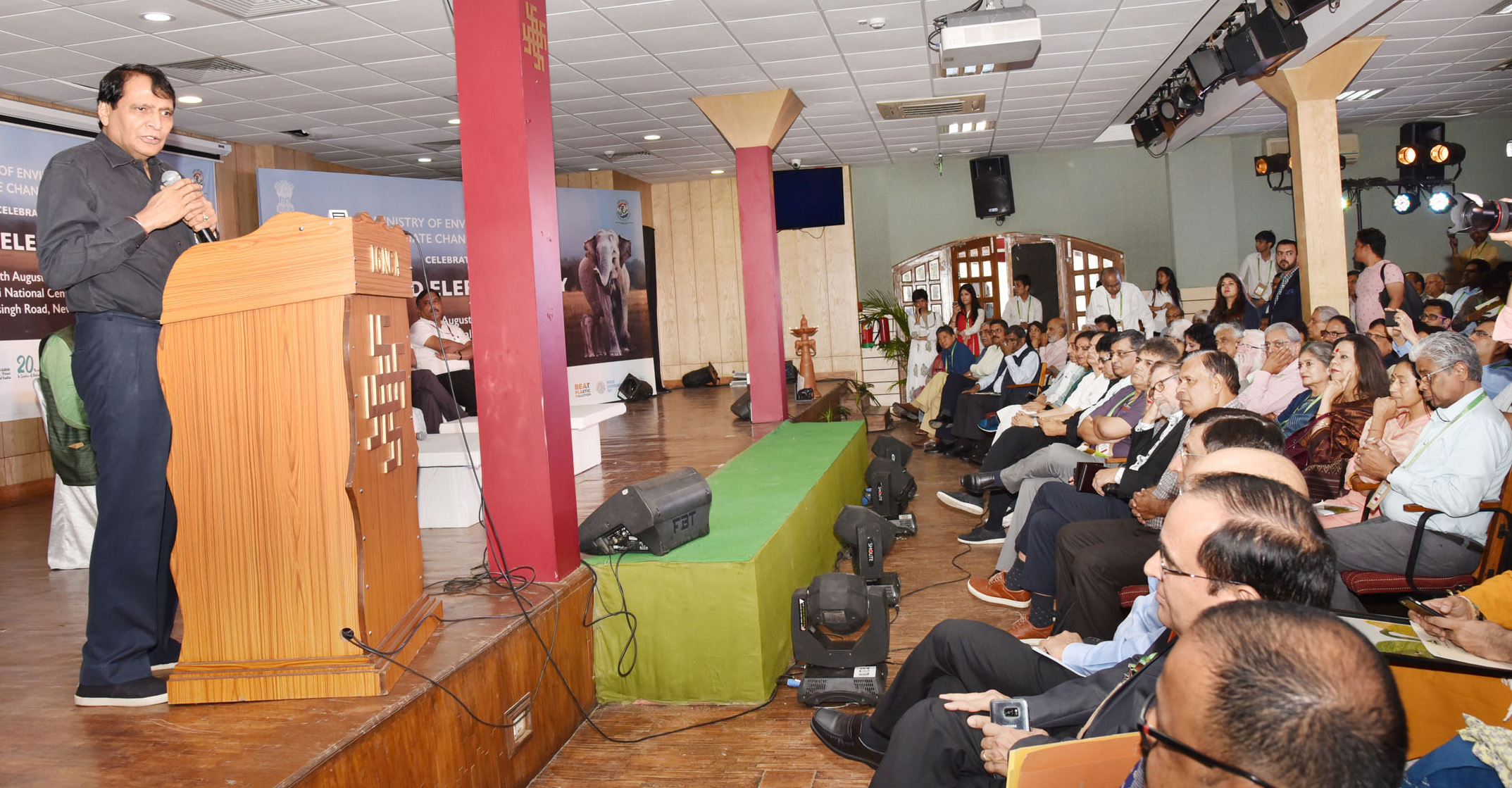
World Elephant Day 2018

World Elephant Day is an international annual event on August 12, dedicated to the preservation and protection of the world's elephants. Conceived in 2011 by Canadian filmmakers Patricia Sims and Michael Clark of Canazwest Pictures, and Sivaporn Dardarananda, Secretary-General of the Elephant Reintroduction Foundation in Thailand, it was officially founded, supported and launched by Patricia Sims and the Elephant Reintroduction Foundation on August 12, 2012. Since that time, Patricia Sims continues to lead, support and direct World Elephant Day, which is now recognized and celebrated by over 100 wildlife organizations and many individuals in countries across the globe.

== Mission ==
The goal of World Elephant Day is to create awareness of the urgent plight of African and Asian elephants, and to share knowledge and positive solutions for the better care and management of captive and wild elephants. African elephants are listed as "Vulnerable" and Asian elephants as "Endangered" on the IUCN Red List of threatened species. One conservationist has stated that both African and Asian elephants face extinction within twelve years. The current population estimates are about 400,000 for African elephants and 40,000 for Asian elephants, although it has been argued that these numbers are much too high.

== History ==
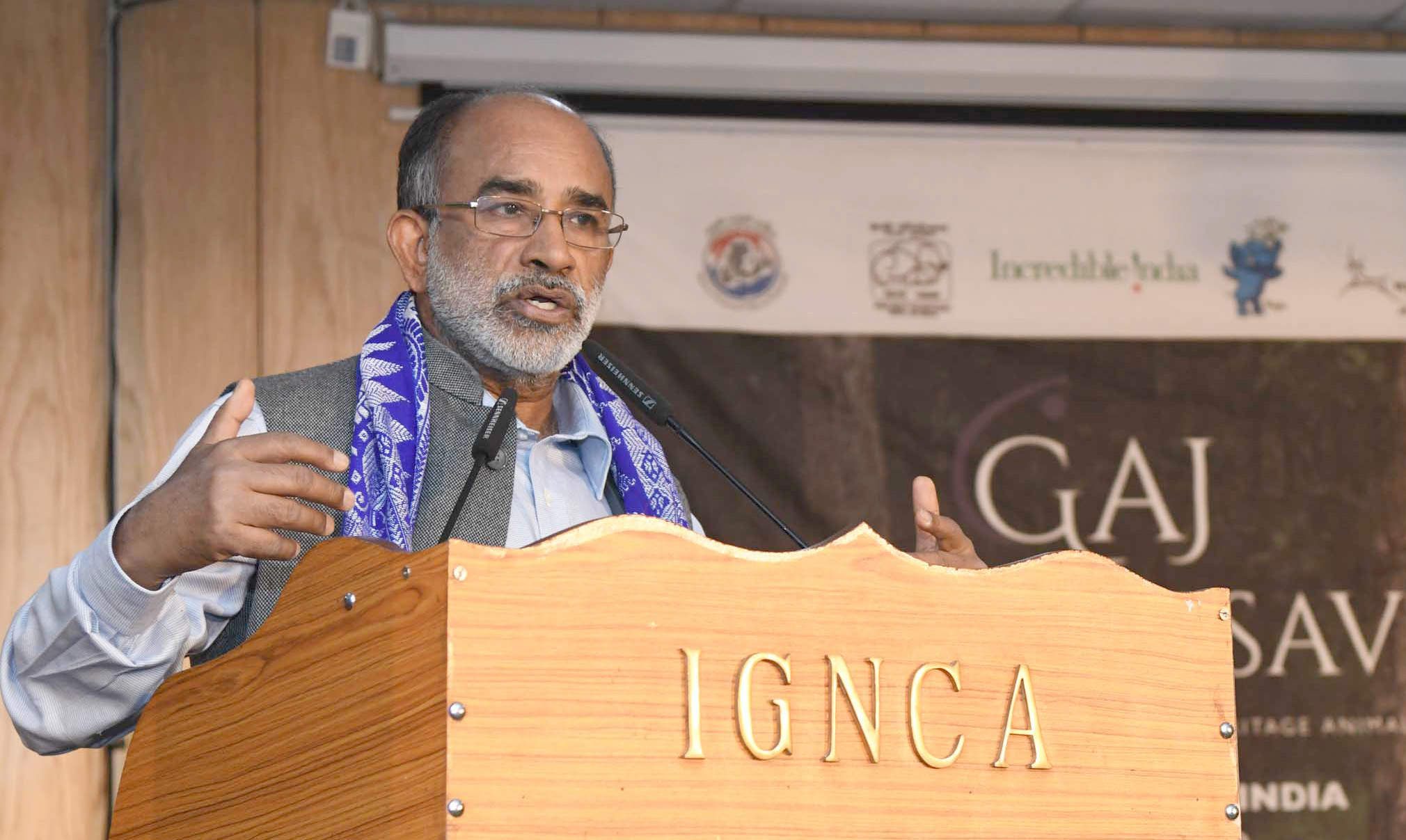
Indian Minister of State for Tourism Alphons Kannanthanam speaking at a World Elephant Day celebration in New Delhi on August 13, 2018

The first World Elephant Day was held on August 12, 2012. The film Return to the Forest, narrated by William Shatner, is about the reintroduction of captive Asian elephants to the wild and was released on the inaugural World Elephant Day. The follow-up feature film When Elephants Were Young, also narrated by Shatner, depicts the life of a young man and young elephant in Thailand.

== See also ==
- List of environmental dates
