= Pong Saen Thong =

Pong Saen Thong ปงแสนทอง
- Subdistrict
- Country: Thailand
- Province: Lampang
- District: Mueang Lampang District

Population (2005)
  - Total: 18,052
- Time zone: UTC+7 (ICT)

Pong Saen Thong (Thai: ปงแสนทอง) is a village and tambon (subdistrict) of Mueang Lampang District, in Lampang Province, Thailand. In 2005 it had a population of 18,052 people. The tambon contains 11 villages.
