= Bunnak Phatthana =

Bunnak Phatthana บุญนาคพัฒนา
- Subdistrict
- Country: Thailand
- Province: Lampang
- District: Mueang Lampang District

Population (2005)
  - Total: 5,165
- Time zone: UTC+7 (ICT)

Bunnak Phatthana (Thai: บุญนาคพัฒนา) is a village and tambon (subdistrict) of Mueang Lampang District, in Lampang Province, Thailand. In 2005, it had a population of 5,165. The tambon contains 11 villages.
