= Tha Sop Sao =

Tha Sop Sao ทาสบเส้า
- Subdistrict
- Country: Thailand
- Province: Lamphun
- District: Mae Tha District

Population (2005)
  - Total: 10,883
- Time zone: UTC+7 (ICT)

Tha Sop Sao (Thai: ทาสบเส้า, pronounced [tʰāː sòp sâw]) is a village and tambon (subdistrict) of Mae Tha District, in Lamphun Province, Thailand. In 2005 it had a population of 10883 people. The tambon contains 16 villages.
