= Suan Dok =

Suan Dok สวนดอก
- Subdistrict
- Country: Thailand
- Province: Lampang
- District: Mueang Lampang District

Population (2005)
  - Total: 5,616
- Time zone: UTC+7 (ICT)

Suan Dok (Thai: สวนดอก) is a village and tambon (subdistrict) of Mueang Lampang District, in Lampang Province, Thailand. In 2005 it had a population of 5616 people.
