= Ban Ueam =

Ban Ueam บ้านเอื้อม
- Subdistrict
- Interactive map of Ban Ueam
- Coordinates: 18.42457°N 99.443378°E
- Country: Thailand
- Province: Lampang
- District: Mueang Lampang District

Population (2005)
  - Total: 10,401
- Time zone: UTC+7 (ICT)

Ban Ueam (Thai: บ้านเอื้อม) is a village and tambon (subdistrict) of Mueang Lampang District, in Lampang Province, Thailand. In 2005, it had a population of 10,401 people. The tambon contains 10 villages.
