= Ban Kha =

Ban Kha บ้านค่า
- Subdistrict
- Interactive map of Ban Kha
- Coordinates: 18.479531°N 99.472242°E
- Country: Thailand
- Province: Lampang
- District: Mueang Lampang District

Population (2005)
  - Total: 5,849
- Time zone: UTC+7 (ICT)

Ban Kha (Thai: บ้านค่า) is a village and tambon (subdistrict) of Mueang Lampang District, in Lampang Province, Thailand. In 2005 it had a population of 5849 people. The tambon contains eight villages.
