= Phichai, Lampang =

Phichai พิชัย
- Subdistrict
- Interactive map of Phichai
- Country: Thailand
- Province: Lampang
- District: Mueang Lampang District

Population (2005)
  - Total: 21,058
- Time zone: UTC+7 (ICT)

Phichai, Lampang (Thai: พิชัย) is a tambon (subdistrict) of Mueang Lampang District, in Lampang Province, Thailand. In 2005 it had a population of 21,058 people. The tambon contains 16 villages.
