= Kluai Phae =

Kluai Phae กล้วยแพะ
- Subdistrict
- Interactive map of Kluai Phae
- Country: Thailand
- Province: Lampang
- District: Mueang Lampang

Population (2016)
  - Total: 9,140
- Time zone: UTC+7 (ICT)
- Postal code: 52000
- TIS 1099: 520107

Kluai Phae (Thai: กล้วยแพะ) is a tambon (subdistrict) of Mueang Lampang District, in Lampang Province, Thailand. In 2016 it had a population of 9,140 people.

== Administration ==
=== Central administration ===
The tambon is divided into six administrative villages (mubans).

No.	Name	Thai
1.	Ban Kluai Luang	บ้านกล้วยหลวง
2.	Ban Kluai Phae	บ้านกล้วยแพะ
3.	Ban Kluai Muang	บ้านกล้วยม่วง
4.	Ban Hua Fai	บ้านหัวฝาย
5.	Ban Kluai Klang	บ้านกล้วยกลาง
6.	Ban Kluai Na Lae Phatthana	บ้านกล้วยนาแลพัฒนา

=== Local administration ===
The subdistrict is part of the town (Thesaban Mueang) Khelang Nakhon (เทศบาลเมืองเขลางค์นคร).
