= Hua Wiang =

Hua Wiang หัวเวียง
- Tambon
- Country: Thailand
- Province: Lampang
- Amphoe: Mueang Lampang

Population (2020)
  - Total: 6,942
- Time zone: UTC+7 (TST)
- Postal code: 52000
- TIS 1099: 520102

Hua Wiang (Thai: หัวเวียง) is a tambon (subdistrict) of Mueang Lampang District, in Lampang Province, Thailand. In 2020 it had a total population of 6,942 people.

== Administration ==
=== Central administration ===
The tambon has no administrative villages (muban).

=== Local administration ===
The whole area of the subdistrict is covered by the city (Thesaban Nakhon) Lampang (เทศบาลนครลำปาง).
