= Tha Khum Ngoen =

Coordinates: 18.4077°N 98.9727°E

Tha Khum Ngoen ทาขุมเงิน
- Subdistrict
- Interactive map of Tha Khum Ngoen
- Country: Thailand
- Province: Lamphun
- District: Mae Tha District

Population (2005)
  - Total: 6,858
- Time zone: UTC+7 (ICT)

Tha Khum Ngoen (Thai: ทาขุมเงิน, pronounced [tʰāː kʰǔm ŋɤ̄n]) is a village and tambon (subdistrict) of Mae Tha District, in Lamphun Province, Thailand. In 2005 it had a population of 6858 people. The tambon contains 11 villages.
