= Doi Mae Tho =

Mountain in Thailand

- ดอยแม่โถ
- Location within Thailand

Highest point
- Elevation: 2,031 m (6,663 ft)
- Prominence: 1,350 m (4,430 ft)
- Listing: Ribu; List of mountains in Thailand
- Coordinates: 19°00′06″N 99°24′20″E

Geography
- Location: Chiang Rai Province
- Parent range: Khun Tan Range

Climbing
- First ascent: unknown

Doi Mae Tho (Thai: ดอยแม่โถ), also known as Doi Langka Luang (ดอยลังกาหลวง) or Doi Lang Ka (ดอยลังกา), is a mountain in Thailand, part of the Khun Tan Range.

The mountain rises southwest of Wiang Pa Pao District, Chiang Rai Province, near the point where the province meets with Chiang Mai and Lampang Provinces. With a height of 2,031 metres, it is the highest point of the Khun Tan Range.

Its summit is less than eight kilometres southeast of Route 118 between Chiang Mai and Chiang Rai.

== See also ==
- Thai highlands
- List of mountains in Thailand
