= Nikhom Phatthana, Lampang =

Nikhom Phatthana นิคมพัฒนา
- Subdistrict
- Interactive map of Nikhom Phatthana
- Coordinates: 18°25′13″N 99°32′37″E
- Country: Thailand
- Province: Lampang
- District: Mueang Lampang District

Population (2010)
  - Total: 5,081
- Time zone: UTC+7 (ICT)
- Postal code: 52000
- Geocode: 520118

Nikhom Phatthana (Thai: นิคมพัฒนา) is a subdistrict (tambon) of Mueang Lampang District, in Lampang Province, Thailand. As of 2010 it has a population of 5081 people.

== History ==
The subdistrict was formed on 30 September 1992 by the separation of 13 villages from Thung Fai Subdistrict.

== Administration ==
Since 1997 the subdistrict has a Tambon administrative organization (TAO) as its local government.

The tambon is divided into 14 administrative villages (mubans).

No.	Name	Thai
1.	Ban Wang Si Phum	บ้านวังศรีภูมิ
2.	Ban Chai Mongkhon	บ้านชัยมงคล
3.	Ban Chot Chai	บ้านโชคชัย
4.	Ban Mai Phatthana	บ้านใหม่พัฒนา
5.	Ban Khlong Nam Lat	บ้านคลองน้ำลัด
6.	Ban Wang Thong	บ้านวังทอง
7.	Ban Chai Phu Thong	บ้านชัยภูทอง
8.	Nan Rom Yen	บ้านร่มเย็น
9.	Ban Rom Sai Rat	บ้านร่มไตรรัตน์
10.	Ban Ruam Chai	บ้านรวมชัย
11.	Ban Nam Rim	บ้านน้ำริน
12.	Ban Si Sai Phum	บ้านศรีไตรภูมิ
13.	Ban Wiang Thong	บ้านเวียงทอง
14.	Ban Wang Ngoen	บ้านวังเงิน
