= Tha Pla Duk =

Tha Pla Duk ทาปลาดุก
- Subdistrict
- Interactive map of Tha Pla Duk
- Coordinates: 18°29′33″N 99°11′45″E
- Country: Thailand
- Province: Lamphun
- District: Mae Tha District

Population (2005)
  - Total: 7,594
- Time zone: UTC+7 (ICT)

Tha Pla Duk (Thai: ทาปลาดุก, pronounced [tʰāː plāː dùk]) is a village and tambon (subdistrict) of Mae Tha District, in Lamphun Province, Thailand. In 2005 it had a population of 7594 people. The tambon contains 14 villages.
