= Khun Tan railway station =

Thai railway station in Lamphun Province

Coordinates: 18.5005°N 99.2652°E

Khun Tan ขุนตาน
- Station in 2026

General information
- Location: Tha Pladuk Subdistrict, Mae Tha District, Lamphun; Thailand
- Operator: State Railway of Thailand
- Line: Northern Line
- Platforms: 3
- Tracks: 3

Other information
- Station code: ขน.

History
- Rebuilt: 1960

Services
Preceding station	State Railway of Thailand	Following station
Mae Tan Noi towards Hua Lamphong or Krung Thep Aphiwat	Northern Line	Tha Chomphu towards Chiang Mai
Location

Khun Tan railway station is a railway station on the Northern Line located in Lamphun Province, Thailand. It is operated by the State Railway of Thailand, and is 683.14 km (424.5 mi) from Bangkok railway station. Khun Tan Railway Station is in the Tha Pladuk Subdistrict, Mae Tha District.

Khun Tan is the highest railway station in Thailand, at 578 metres (1,896 ft 4 in) above sea level. Around the railway station is the entrance Doi Khuntan National Park, which has bungalows run by the State Railway of Thailand, for visitors' use as well.

== Khun Tan Tunnel ==
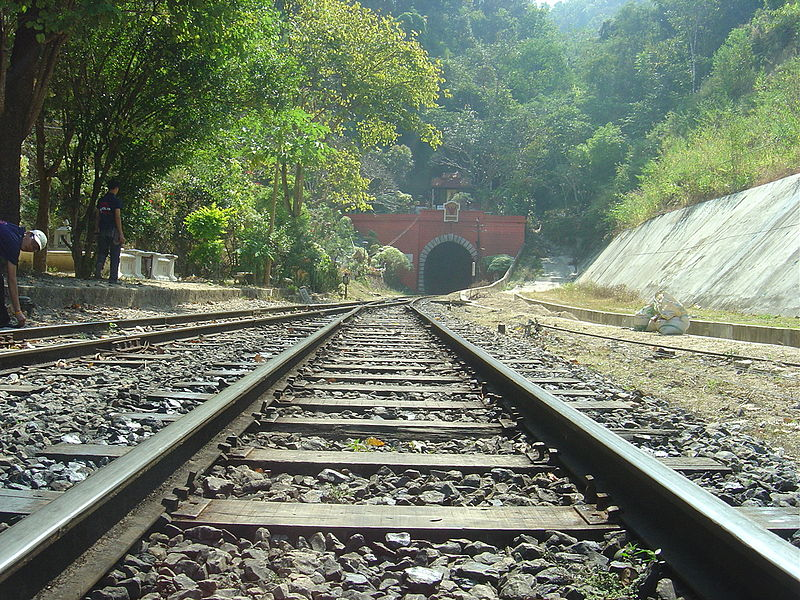
Khun Tan Tunnel

Two hundred metres south of Khun Tan Railway Station is the Khun Tan Tunnel. Since 2024, It is the second longest railway tunnel in Thailand, at 1,352.1 metres (4,436 ft 0 in) in length after the Pha Sadet tunnel. Construction took 11 years at a cost of 1.3 million baht. It was finished in 1918.

== Gallery ==
Former station building. Opened from 1918 to 1960

Current station building, completed in 1959 and opened in 1960.
