= Thung Fai =

Thung Fai ทุ่งฝาย
- Tambon
- Interactive map of Thung Fai
- Coordinates: 18°22′03″N 99°33′03″E
- Country: Thailand
- Province: Lampang
- Amphoe: Mueang Lampang

Population (2020)
  - Total: 7,697
- Time zone: UTC+7 (TST)
- Postal code: 52000
- TIS 1099: 520112

Thung Fai (Thai: ทุ่งฝาย) is a tambon (subdistrict) of Mueang Lampang District, in Lampang Province, Thailand. In 2020 it had a total population of 7,697 people.

== Administration ==
=== Central administration ===
The tambon is subdivided into 10 administrative villages (muban).

| No. | Name | Thai |
|---|---|---|
| 1. | Ban Tha Som Poi | บ้านท่าส้มป่อย |
| 2. | Ban Thung Fai | บ้านทุ่งฝาย |
| 3. | Ban Phae Nong Daeng | บ้านแพะหนองแดง |
| 4. | Ban Tha Thok | บ้านท่าโทก |
| 5. | Ban Mae Tha | บ้านแม่ทะ |
| 6. | Ban Klang | บ้านกลาง |
| 7. | Ban Na Po Nuea | บ้านนาป้อเหนือ |
| 8. | Ban Ton Yang | บ้านต้นยาง |
| 9. | Ban Tha Thok Mongkhon Chai | บ้านท่าโทกมงคลชัย |
| 10. | Ban Pong Chai Na Po | บ้านปงชัยนาป้อ |

=== Local administration ===
The whole area of the subdistrict is covered by the subdistrict administrative organization (SAO) Thung Fai (องค์การบริหารส่วนตำบลทุ่งฝาย).
