= Bo Haeo =

Bo Haeo บ่อแฮ้ว
- Subdistrict
- Interactive map of Bo Haeo
- Coordinates: 18.304825°N 99.465723°E
- Country: Thailand
- Province: Lampang
- District: Mueang Lampang District

Population (2005)
  - Total: 18,777
- Time zone: UTC+7 (ICT)

Bo Haeo (Thai: บ่อแฮ้ว) is a village and tambon (subdistrict) of Mueang Lampang District, in Lampang Province, Thailand. In 2005, it had a population of 18,777 people. The tambon contains 17 villages.
