= Ban Pao, Lampang =

Ban Pao บ้านเป้า
- Tambon
- Country: Thailand
- Province: Lampang
- Amphoe: Mueang Lampang

Population (2021)
  - Total: 6,650
- Time zone: UTC+7 (TST)
- Postal code: 52100
- TIS 1099: 520114

Ban Pao (Thai: บ้านเป้า) is a tambon (subdistrict) of Mueang Lampang District, in Lampang Province, Thailand. In 2021 it had a total population of 6,650 people.

== Administration ==
=== Central administration ===
The tambon is subdivided into 12 administrative villages (muban).

No.	Name	Thai
1.	Ban Khae	บ้านแค่
2.	Ban Thung Man Nuea	บ้านทุ่งม่านเหนือ
3.	Ban Mae Kong	บ้านแม่ก๋ง
4.	Ban Lao	บ้านเหล่า
5.	Ban Pao	บ้านเป้า
6.	Ban Mai	บ้านใหม่
7.	Ban Bo Hin	บ้านบ่อหิน
8.	Ban Pao	บ้านเป้า
9.	Ban Hua Thung	บ้านหัวทุ่ง
10.	Ban Sop Phrai	บ้านสบไพร
11.	Ban Thung Man Tai	บ้านทุ่งม่านใต้
12.	Ban Sop Kong - Thang Thung	บ้านสบก๋ง – หางทุ่ง

=== Local administration ===
The whole area of the subdistrict is covered by the subdistrict administrative organization (SAO) Ban Pao (องค์การบริหารส่วนตำบลบ้านเป้า).
