= Ban Laeng =

- Subdistrict
- Country: Thailand
- Province: Lampang
- District: Mueang Lampang District

Population (2005)
  - Total: 6,993
- Time zone: UTC+7 (ICT)

Ban Laeng (Thai: ?) is a village and tambon (subdistrict) of Mueang Lampang District, in Lampang Province, Thailand. In 2005 it had a population of 6993 people. The tambon contains 12 villages.
