= Elephant Reintroduction Foundation =

Thai non-profit conservation organization

The Elephant Reintroduction Foundation (Thai: มูลนิธิคืนช้างสู่ธรรมชาติ) is a non-profit conservation organization whose goal is to re-introduce captive elephants into their natural habitat. It was founded in 1996, on the initiative of Queen Sirikit of Thailand. Between 1998 and 2012, the organization had acquired and released back into the wild 84 elephants.

== Background ==
Asian elephants are currently listed as "Endangered" on the IUCN Red List of threatened species. At the same time, it is estimated that there are over 2800 domesticated elephants in Thailand, either in zoos and conservatories or employed by loggers and the tourist industry. They outnumber Thailand's wild elephant population, estimated at only 2000. In Bangkok, tens of domesticated elephants are used by mahouts to solicit food and money.

== See also ==
- National Elephant Institute
