= Chomphu, Lampang =

- Subdistrict
- Country: Thailand
- Province: Lampang
- District: Mueang Lampang District

Population (2005)
  - Total: 26,803
- Time zone: UTC+7 (ICT)

Chomphu, Lampang (Thai: ตำบลชมพู จังหวัดลำปาง) is a village and tambon (subdistrict) of Mueang Lampang District, in Lampang Province, Thailand. In 2005 it had a population of 26,803 people. The tambon contains 14 villages.
