= Sop Tui =

Sop Tui สบตุ๋ย
- Subdistrict
- Country: Thailand
- Province: Lampang
- District: Mueang Lampang District

Population (2005)
  - Total: 15,100
- Time zone: UTC+7 (ICT)

Sop Tui (Thai: สบตุ๋ย) is a village and tambon (subdistrict) of Mueang Lampang District, in Lampang Province, Thailand. In 2005 it had a population of 15,100 people.
