= Khun Tan Range =

Mountain range in Thailand

- ทิวเขาขุนตาน
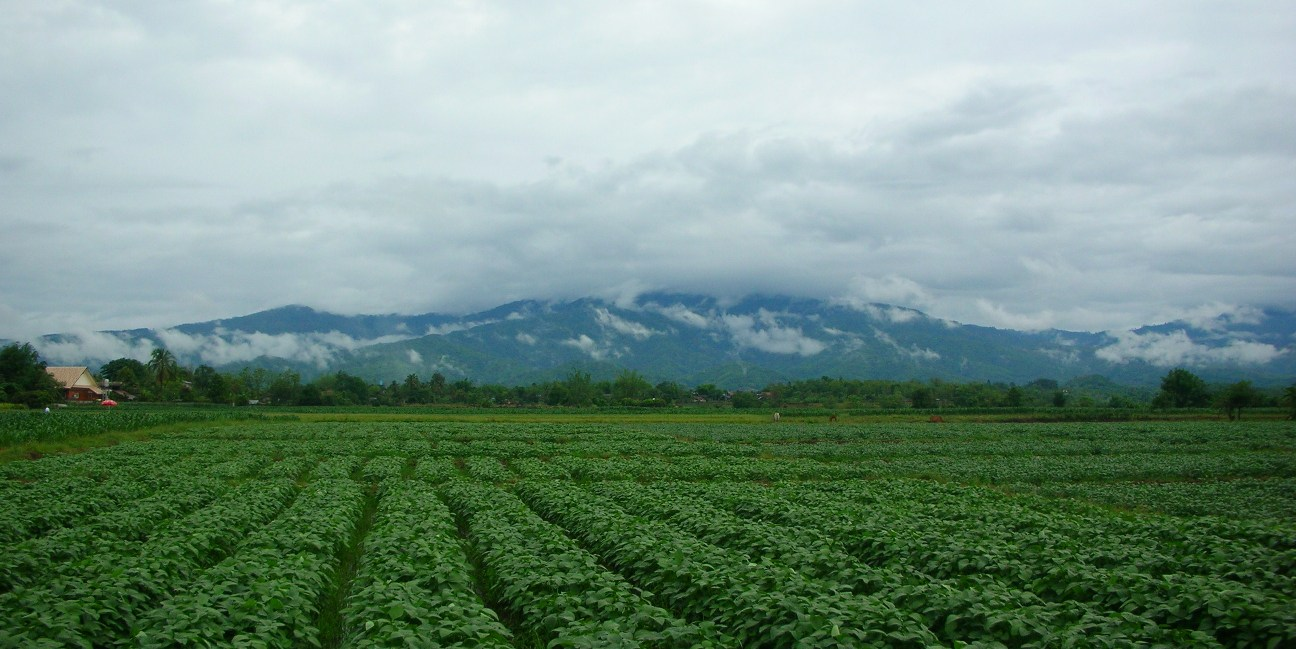
- View of the Khun Tan Range in Mae Lao District

Highest point
- Peak: Doi Mae Tho
- Elevation: 2,031 m (6,663 ft)
- Coordinates: 19°05′00″N 99°20′30″E

Dimensions
- Length: 260 km (160 mi) N/S
- Width: 50 km (31 mi) E/W

Geography
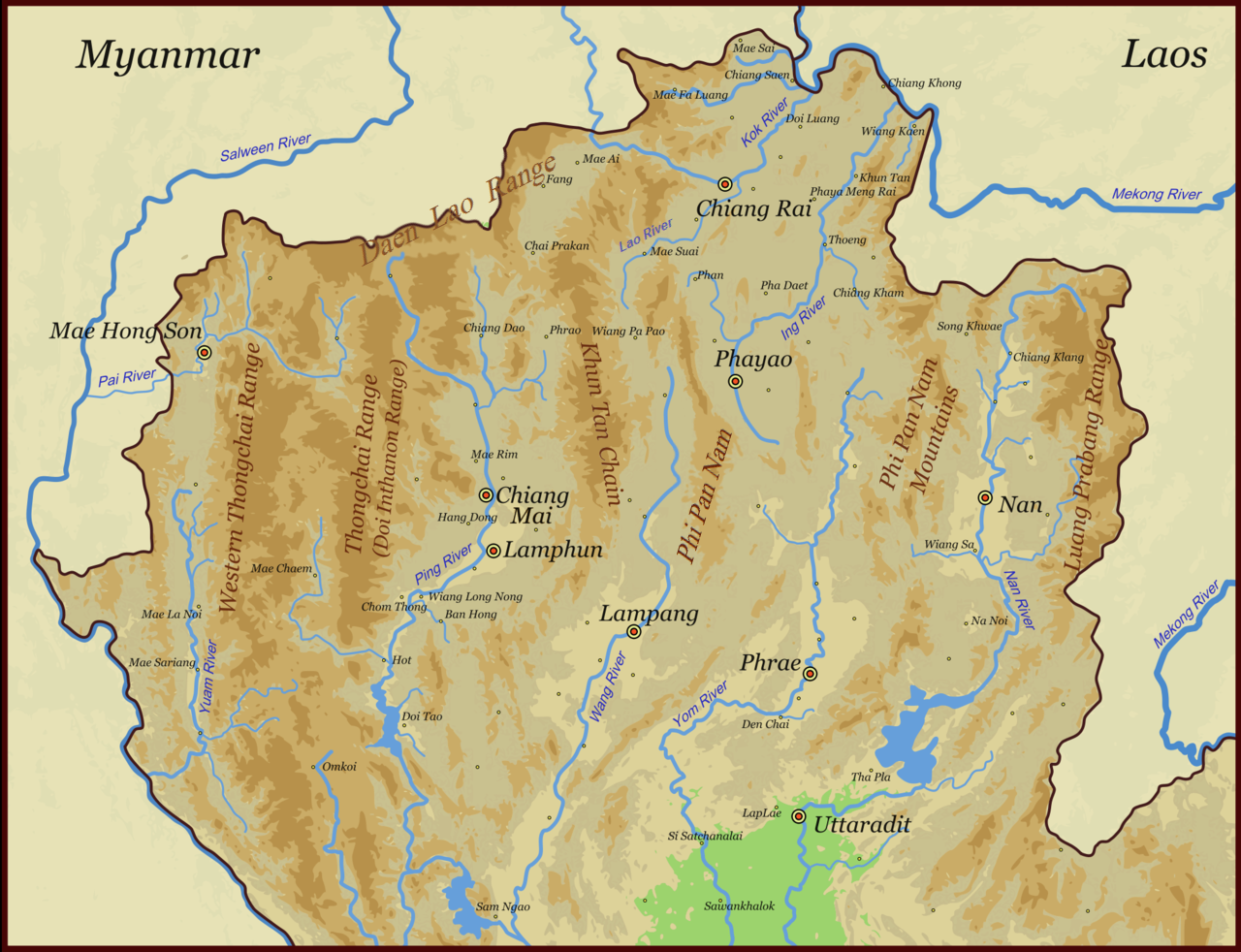
- Map of the Thai highlands
- Country: Thailand
- Provinces: Chiang Mai, Chiang Rai, Lampang and Lamphun
- Parent range: Phi Pan Nam Range

Geology
- Rock age: Triassic
- Rock types: granite, phyllite, shale and limestone

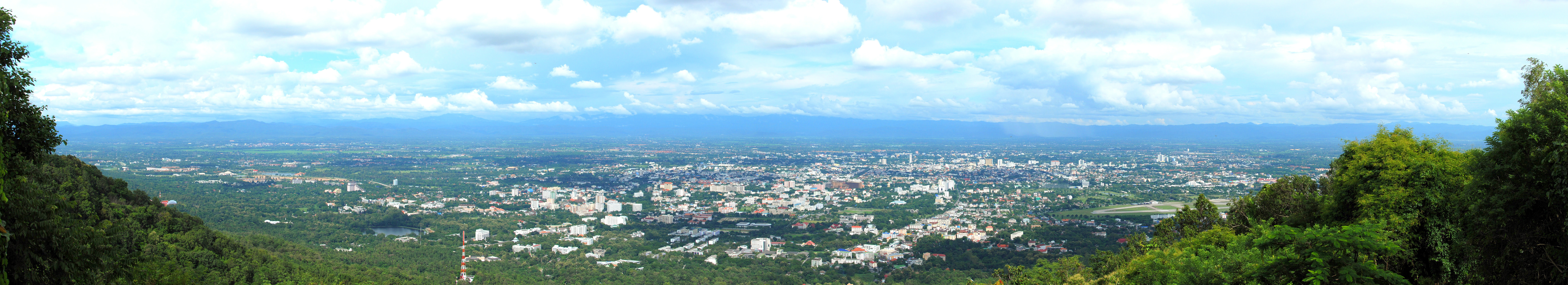
The Khun Tan Range rising beyond Chiang Mai seen from Doi Suthep on the other side of the valley

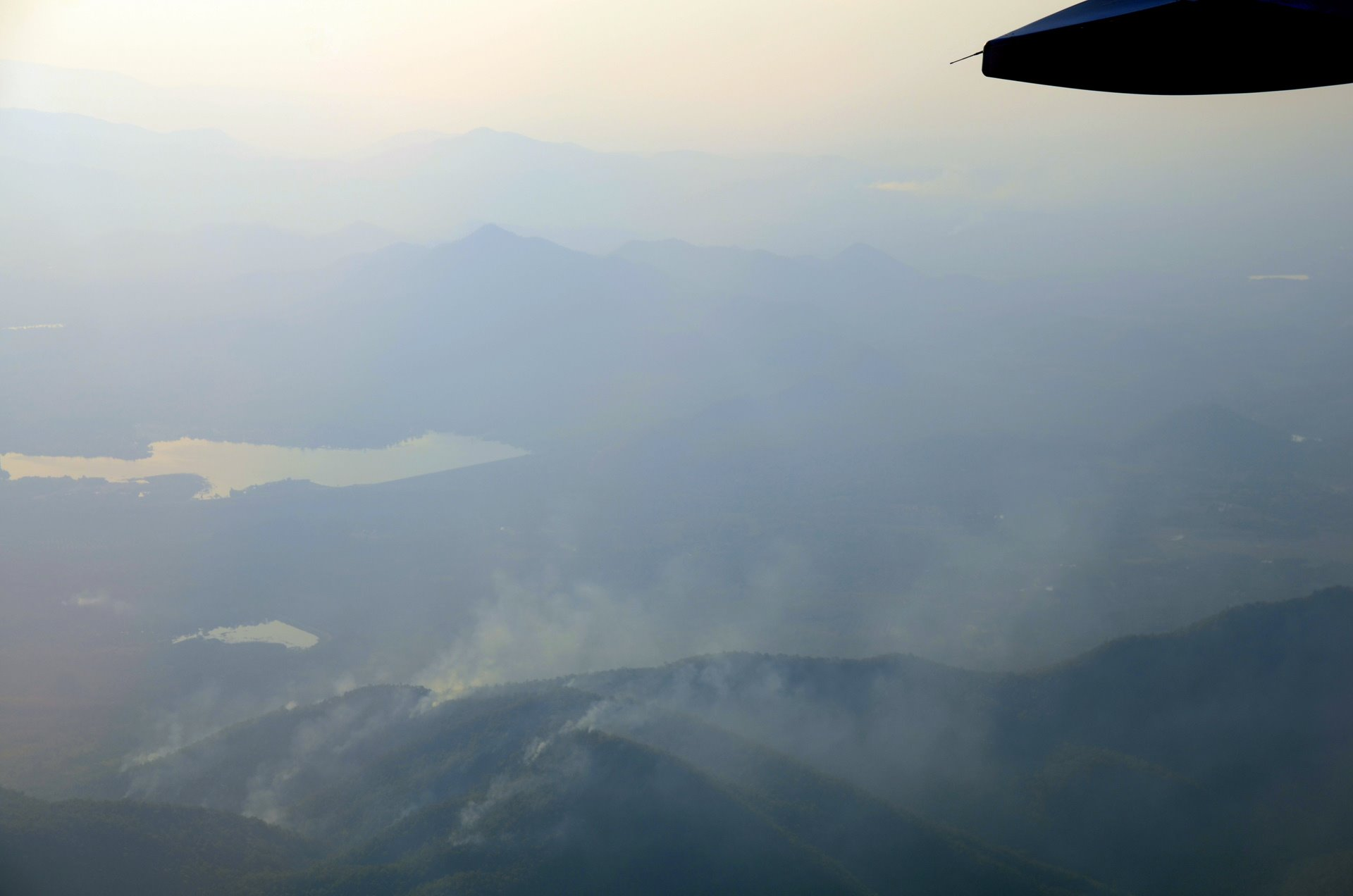
Aerial view of yearly deliberate wildfires on the Khun Tan Range between Lamphun and Lampang

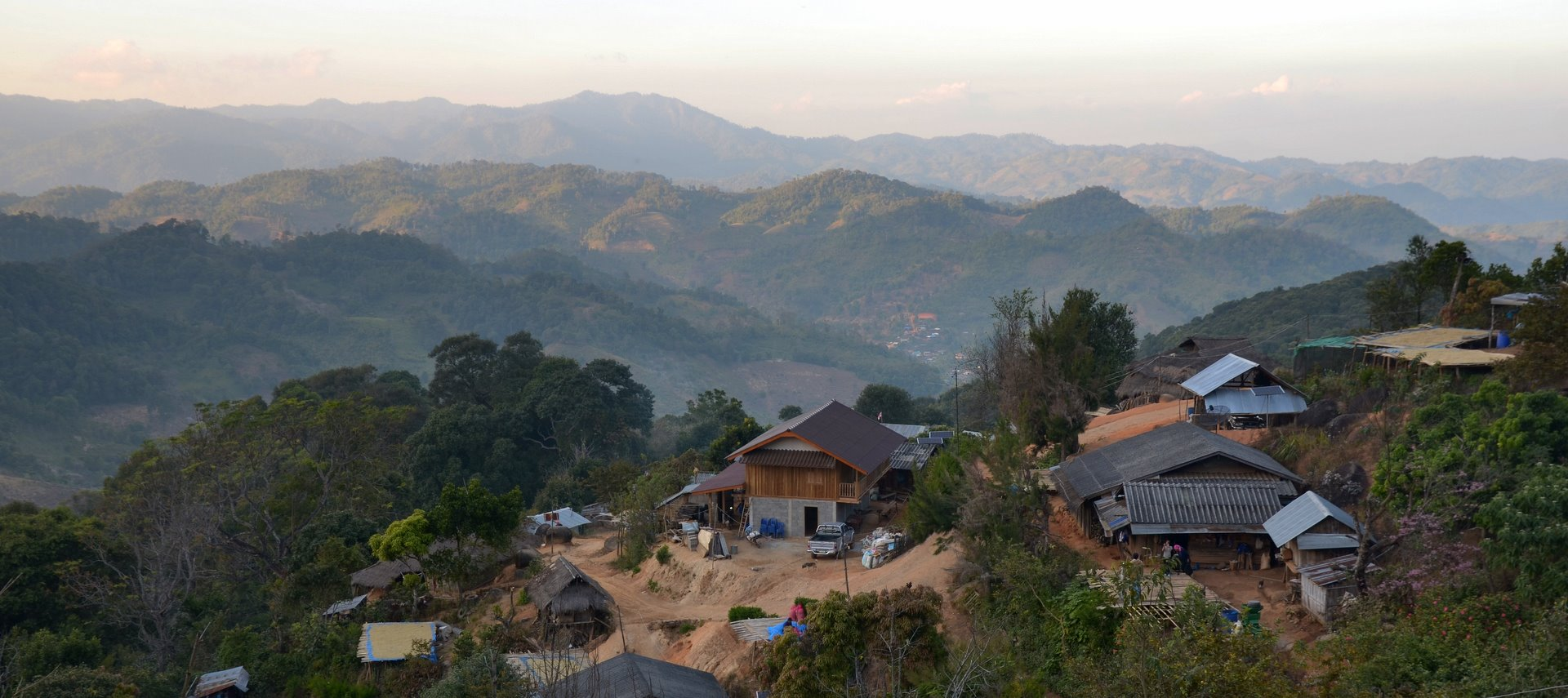
The Akha village of Maejantai lies deep in the heart of the Khun Tan range

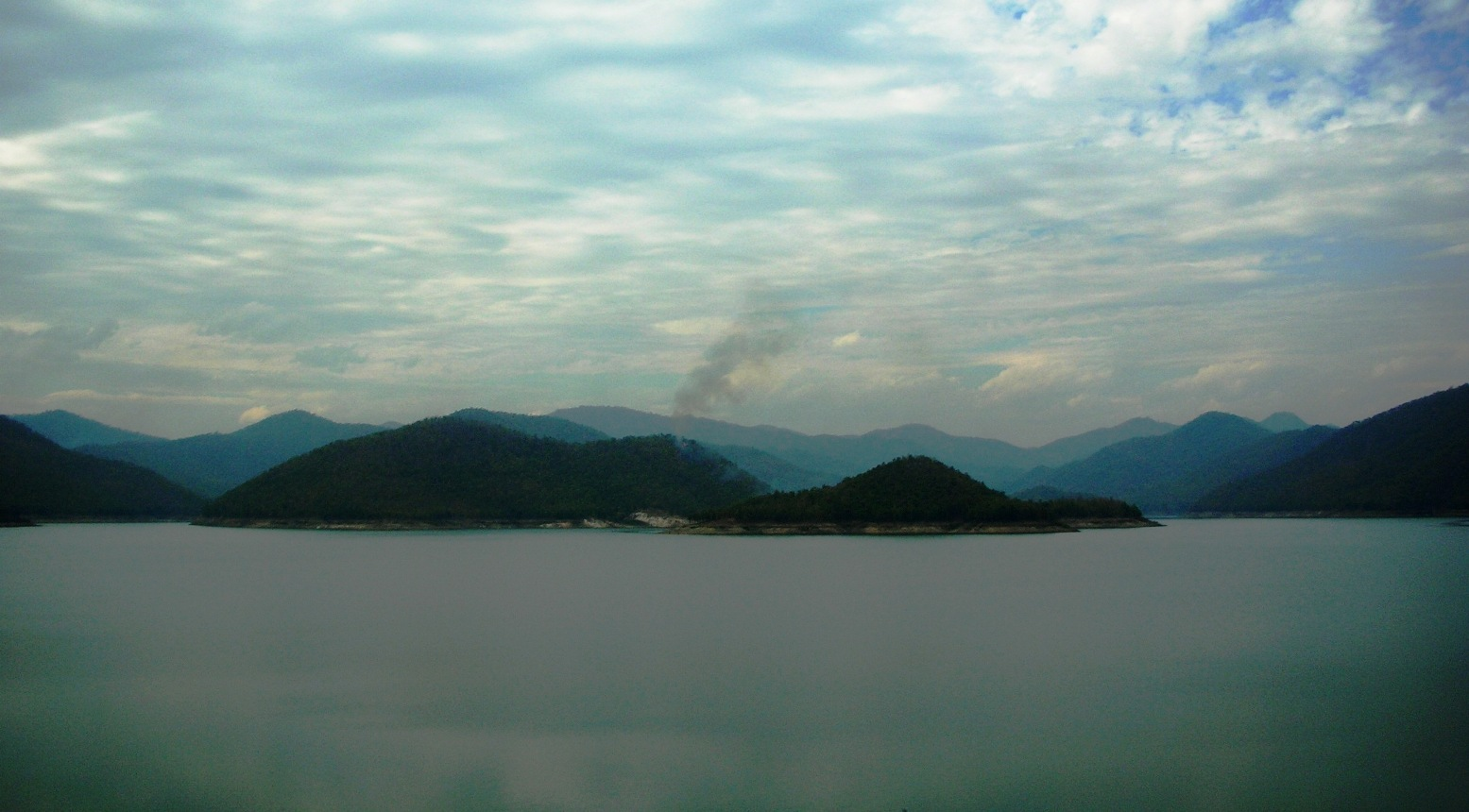
Mae Kuang Reservoir NE of Chiang Mai with the Khun Tan Range in the background and a seasonal wildfire

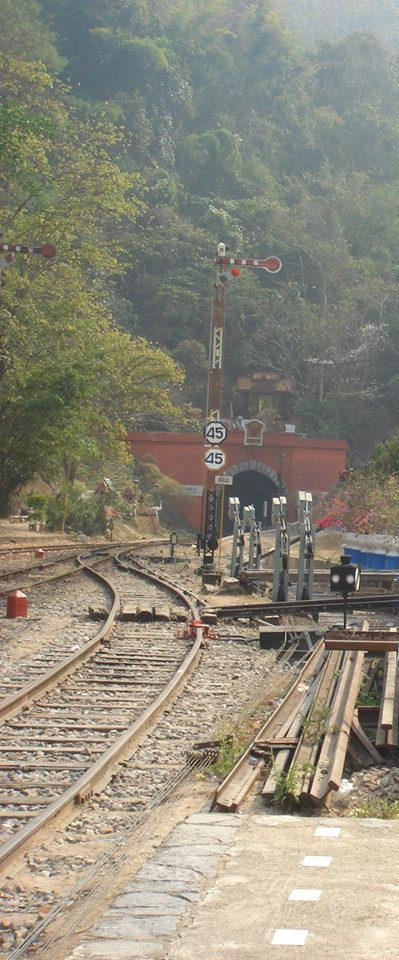
Entrance to the Khun Tan Tunnel. The haze caused by wildfire smoke is common during the dry season.

The Khun Tan Range (Thai: ทิวเขาขุนตาน or, erroneously, ทิวเขาขุนตาล) is a mountain range that occupies a central position in Northern Thailand. Most of the range is located in Chiang Mai, western Chiang Rai, Lampang and Lamphun Provinces.

The geological composition of the Khun Tan mountains is different from the neighboring Thanon Thong Chai Range in the west and the Daen Lao Range in the north. Precambrian rocks are absent in this mountain chain which is thus not part of the Shan Hills system. The geology of the Khun Tan Range is homogeneous with the Phi Pan Nam Range further east and some scholarly works designate the Khun Tan as the "Western Phi Pan Nam Range", including it as part of the Phi Pan Nam Mountain System.

== Geography ==
The Khun Tan Range begins south of the Kok River valley, at the southern end of the Daen Lao Range in Fang District. It stretches southwards in a north/south direction turning midway to a roughly NE/SW direction between the Ping River and the Wang River until Doi Tao District. The tallest peak is 2,031 m high Doi Mae Tho (ดอยแม่โถ), also known as Doi Langka Luang (ดอยลังกาหลวง); Other peaks are 2,012 m high Doi Pha Cho (ดอยผาจ้อ), 1,348 m high Doi Khun Tan (ดอยขุนตาน), 1,668 m high Doi Mon Lan and 1,816 m high Doi Saket (ดอยสะเก็ด), also known as Doi Khun On (ดอยขุนออน).

Along with the westernmost range of the Phi Pan Nam Mountains further east this range separates the intermontane basins and plateaus of Chiang Mai and Chiang Rai. Temperatures range from a maximum of 33°C in the hot season (February to July), to a minimum of 2°C during the cold season, between November and January. Snow fell in the Chai Prakan and Mae Suai District areas of the range in 1955, a very rare event in these latitudes despite the altitude.

== History ==
Historically the Khun Tan Range was a formidable natural barrier between the Lanna Kingdom and the Central Plain of Siam.

The Khun Tan Tunnel was built in 1907 across the southern part of the range and contributed to alleviate the difficulties in communication between Bangkok and Chiang Mai. It is the longest railway tunnel in Thailand and it took eleven years to complete. Construction was disrupted owing to the arrest of the German engineers in World War I when Siam, having been neutral until July 1917, declared war on the Central Powers. Khun Tan Station, located at the northern end of the tunnel, is the highest railway station in Thailand at 758 m above sea level.

There are certain Hill tribe communities living in the Khun Tan Range, like the Yao and the Akha who have villages in the mountain sides of the northern areas of the range in Phrao District. Part of the hill people are refugees from troubled areas in Burma and some of these communities are regularly visited by organized tourist groups.

Thailand Route 118 between Chiang Mai and Chiang Rai cuts diagonally across the Khun Tan Range from SW to NE about 30 km northeast of Chiang Mai town.

== Ecology ==
The lower altitudes are covered with dry mixed deciduous forest, while hill evergreen forest grows above 800 m, as well as in shady and narrow zones in the valleys.

Extensive wildfires are deliberately set off by local farmers in the mountain forests of the Khun Tan Range every year between February and April towards the end of the dry season. One of the purposes of this somewhat radical activity is to trigger the growth of the Astraeus odoratus mushroom (Thai: เห็ดเผาะ; het pho) that fetches a high price on the Thai market. Often speculators hire people to set forests on fire in order to claim land title deeds for the areas that have become "degraded forest".

Although the large trees are not too badly affected, the periodic fires negatively affect the wildlife of vast areas of the mountain chain. These yearly wildfires are the main cause of the intense air pollution in Northern Thailand and contribute to the floods in the country by completely denuding the undergrowth of the woods. The dry forest soil leads to lower water intake for the trees to extract when the rains arrive.

=== Wildlife ===
Many species of mammals are assumed to have disappeared in the range for lack of recent sightings, such as the Asiatic black bear, the slow loris, the white-handed gibbon, the leopard cat and the serow. Animals that have been sighted recently include civets, wild pigs, barking deer, hog badgers, flying squirrels and bats.

Among the birds, the ashy drongo, scarlet minivet, grey-headed canary-flycatcher, white-crowned forktail, brown fish owl, crested serpent eagle, shikra, velvet-fronted nuthatch, blue-throated barbet, coppersmith barbet, blue-winged leafbird, brown-cheeked fulvetta and red junglefowl deserve mention. The Khun Tan mountains also act as a natural barrier for species west and east of the range, such as the pied bushchat.

Reptiles in the range include the green tree viper, the king cobra and the flying lizard.

=== Protected areas ===
The Mae Ta Krai National Park protecting the source of the On River (น้ำแม่ออน), a tributary of the Ping River, is located in Mae On District. Other protected areas in the Khun Tan mountain chain are:

- Doi Khun Tan National Park
- Chae Son National Park
- Khun Chae National Park
- Si Lanna National Park
- Doi Wiang Pha National Park

== Tourism ==
Tourist attractions of the Khun Tan Range include caves, waterfalls and natural hot springs. The Thai Elephant Conservation Center is located in the southern foothills of the range. It is an institute taking care of elephants since 1993 under the patronage of the Royal Family of Thailand.

Mae On District east of Chiang Mai is a popular destination for rock climbers who wish to climb the limestone cliffs of the place nicknamed "Crazy Horse Buttress" in the Range.

== See also ==
- Western Forest Complex
- Thai highlands
- Environmental issues in Thailand
- Deforestation in Thailand
