= National Elephant Institute =

Conservation center in Thailand

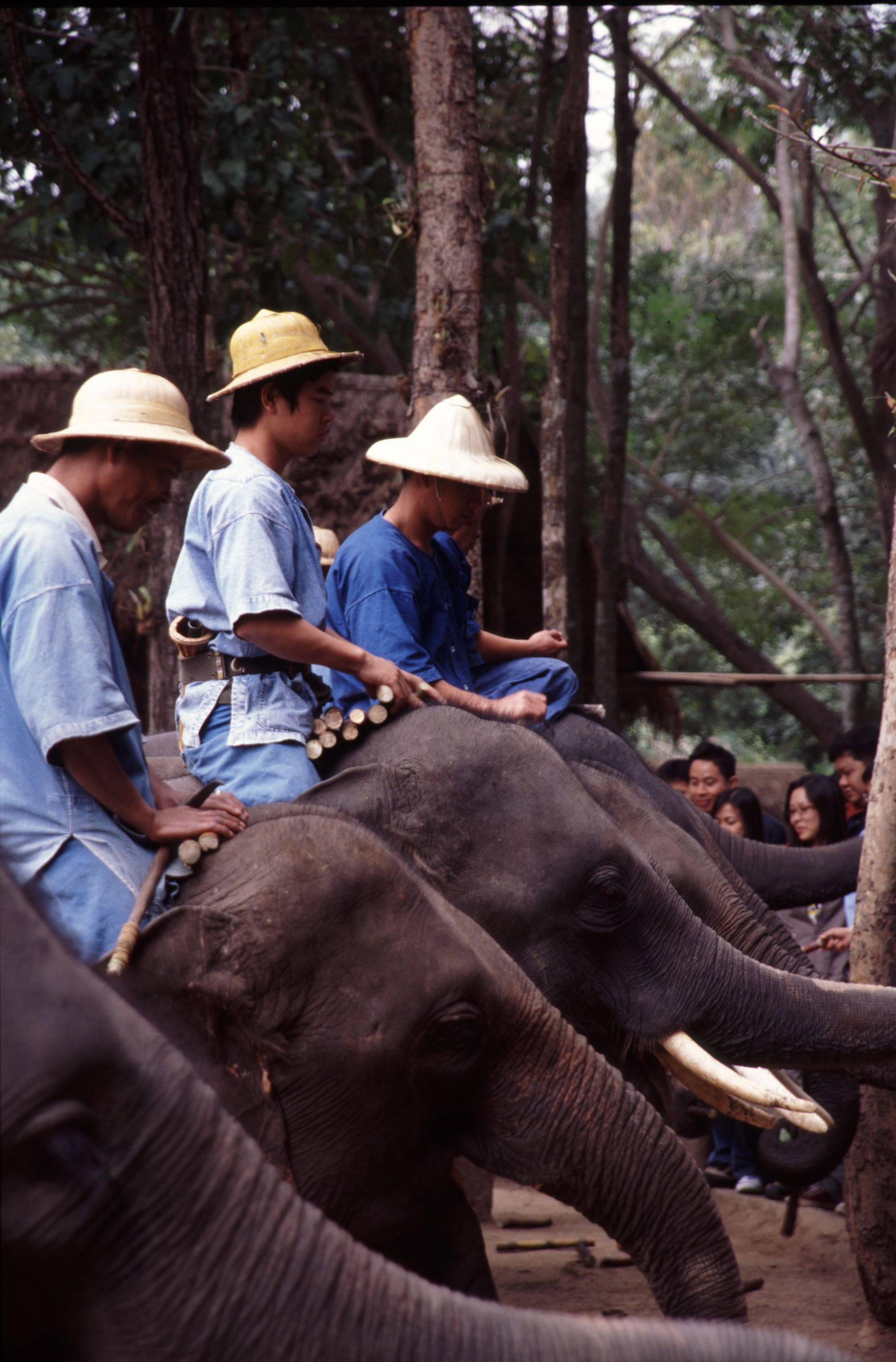
Elephant show

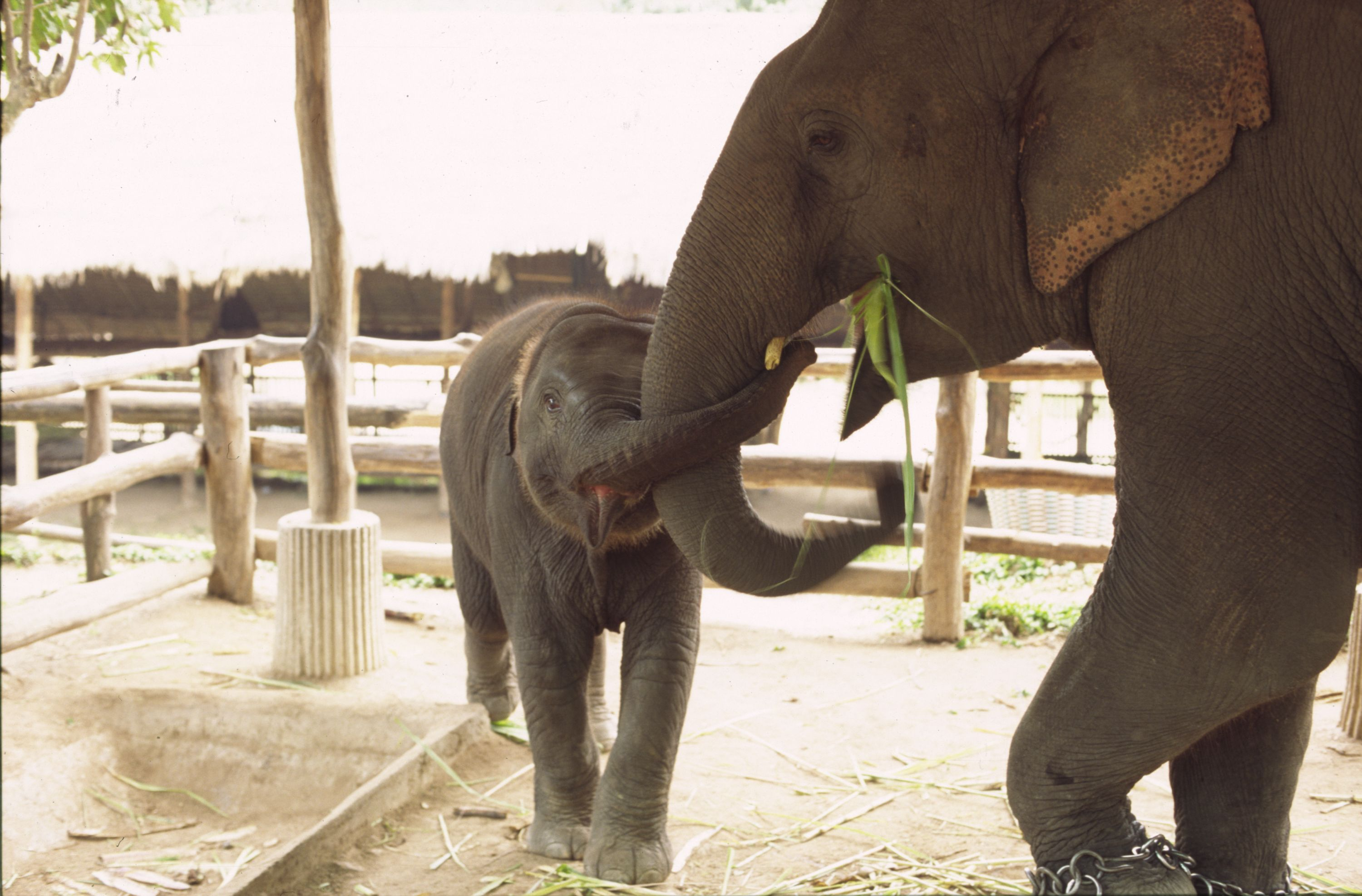
Elephant mother and calf

The National Elephant Institute was founded as the Thai Elephant Conservation Center (TECC) in 1993. In January 2002, in order to enlarge the scope of conservation efforts and address the issues facing Thailand's elephants, it was proposed that the TECC be renamed the National Elephant Institute. Despite that, the older name is still in use. It is in Hang Chat District, Lampang Province. Chiang Mai University's Faculty of Veterinary Medicine is associated with the institute.

The objective of the National Elephant Institute is to develop elephant conservation in a sustainable way and preserve local traditions for future generations. The institute also aims to improve the tourism business, in which there is an extensive involvement of elephants in tourism-related activities, for the benefit of elephants as well as tourists. The National Elephant Institute is a World Elephant Day associate.
