= Mueang Lampang district =

Mueang Lampang เมืองลำปาง
- District
- District location in Lampang province
- Coordinates: 18°17′31″N 99°30′16″E
- Country: Thailand
- Province: Lampang

Area
  - Total: 1,156.6 km^{2} (446.6 sq mi)

Population (2008)
  - Total: 235,092
  - Density: 205.2/km^{2} (531/sq mi)
- Time zone: UTC+7 (ICT)
- Postal code: 52000
- Geocode: 5201

Mueang Lampang (Thai: เมืองลำปาง; IPA: [mɯ̄aŋ lām.pāːŋ]) is the capital district (amphoe mueang) of Lampang province, northern Thailand.

== Geography ==
Neighboring districts are (from the north clockwise): Mueang Pan, Chae Hom, Mae Mo, Mae Tha, Ko Kha and Hang Chat of Lampang Province, Mae Tha of Lamphun province, and Mae On of Chiang Mai province.

The Khun Tan Range rises in the west and the Phi Pan Nam Range in the east of the district.

== History ==
In 1917, the district was renamed from Mueang to Mueang Lampang.

== Administration ==
The district is divided into 19 sub-districts (tambons), which are further subdivided into 180 villages (mubans). Lampang is a city (thesaban nakhon) covering tambons Wiang Nuea, Suan Dok, Sop Tui and parts of tambons Hua Wiang, Phichai, Chomphu, Phrabat, and Bo Haeo. The town (thesaban mueang) Khelang Nakhon covers tambons Kluai Phae and Pong Saen Thong, and parts of tambons Phrabat and Chomphu. There are two sub-district municipalities (thesaban tambon): Bo Haeo and Phichai. Each cover parts of the same-named tambons. There are a further 11 tambon administrative organizations (TAO).

No.	Name	Thai	Villages	Pop.
1.	Wiang Nuea	เวียงเหนือ	-	12,008
2.	Hua Wiang	หัวเวียง	-	11,341
3.	Suan Dok	สวนดอก	-	5,616
4.	Sop Tui	สบตุ๋ย	-	15,100
5.	Phra Bat	พระบาท	9	21,838
6.	Chomphu	ชมพู	14	26,803
7.	Kluai Phae	กล้วยแพะ	5	9,651
8.	Pong Saen Thong	ปงแสนทอง	11	18,052
9.	Ban Laeng	บ้านแลง	12	6,993
10.	Ban Sadet	บ้านเสด็จ	14	11,094
11.	Phichai	พิชัย	16	21,058
12.	Thung Fai	ทุ่งฝาย	9	8,213
13.	Ban Ueam	บ้านเอื้อม	15	10,401
14.	Ban Pao	บ้านเป้า	12	6,979
15.	Ban Kha	บ้านค่า	8	5,849
16.	Bo Haeo	บ่อแฮ้ว	17	18,777
17.	Ton Thong Chai	ต้นธงชัย	13	15,093
18.	Nikhom Phatthana	นิคมพัฒนา	14	5,061
19.	Bunnak Phatthana	บุญนาคพัฒนา	11	5,165
