= Hang Chat district =

Hang Chat ห้างฉัตร
- District
- District location in Lampang province
- Coordinates: 18°19′19″N 99°19′4″E
- Country: Thailand
- Province: Lampang
- Seat: Wiang Tan

Area
  - Total: 684.757 km^{2} (264.386 sq mi)

Population (2005)
  - Total: 51,495
  - Density: 75.2/km^{2} (195/sq mi)
- Time zone: UTC+7 (ICT)
- Postal code: 52190
- Geocode: 5212

Hang Chat (Thai: ห้างฉัตร, pronounced [hâːŋ tɕʰàt]; Northern Thai: ᩉ᩶ᩣ᩠ᨦᨨᩢᨲ᩠᩺ᨲ, pronounced [ha᷇ːŋ sǎt]) is a district (amphoe) in the western part of Lampang province, northern Thailand.

== Geography ==
Neighboring districts are (from the northeast clockwise): Mueang Lampang, Ko Kha, Soem Ngam of Lampang Province and Mae Tha of Lamphun province. The Khun Tan Range stretches from north to south along the district.

== History ==
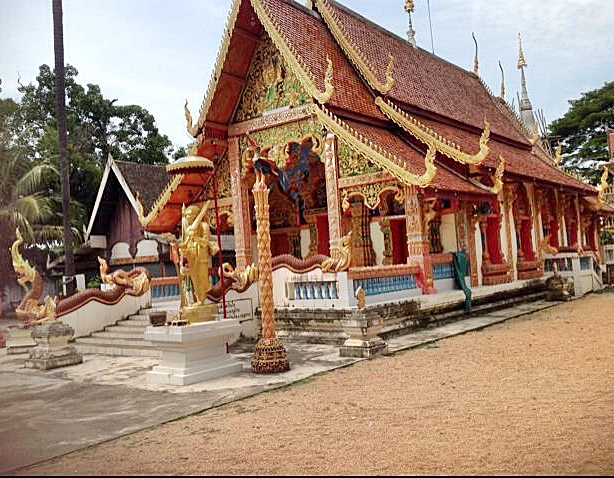
Wat Pong Yang Kok

Originally named Hang Sat (หางสัตว์, 'animal tail'), it was renamed Hang Chat (ห้างฉัตร, 'arch under royal umbrella') in 1940.

== Administration ==
The district is divided into seven sub-districts (tambons), which are further subdivided into 73 villages (mubans). Hang Chat is a township (thesaban tambon) which covers parts of tambon Hang Chat. There are a further seven tambon administrative organizations (TAO).

No.	Name	Thai name	Villages	Pop.
1.	Hang Chat	ห้างฉัตร	9	10,216
2.	Nong Lom	หนองหล่ม	9	5,266
3.	Mueang Yao	เมืองยาว	15	8,267
4.	Pong Yang Khok	ปงยางคก	13	9,821
5.	Wiang Tan	เวียงตาล	11	8,778
6.	Mae San	แม่สัน	9	4,729
7.	Wo Kaeo	วอแก้ว	7	4,418

== See also ==
- National Elephant Institute
