= 2021 Birthday Honours =

British government recognitions

The Queen's Birthday Honours for 2021 are appointments by some of the 16 Commonwealth realms of Queen Elizabeth II to various orders and honours to reward and highlight good works by citizens of those countries. The Birthday Honours are awarded as part of the Queen's Official Birthday celebrations during the month of June. The honours for New Zealand were announced on 7 June.

== United Kingdom ==
Below are the individuals appointed by Elizabeth II in her right as Queen of the United Kingdom with honours within her own gift, and with the advice of the Government for other honours.

=== Knight Bachelor ===
- William Lester Adderley. Philanthropist. For services to Charity.
- Professor John Alexander David Aston. Harding Professor of Statistics, University of Cambridge, and lately Chief Scientific Adviser, Home Office. For services to Statistics and Public Policymaking.
- Philip Augar. Lately Chair, Post-18 Education and Funding Review. For services to Higher and Further Education Policy.
- Michael David William Gooley, CBE. Founder, Trailfinders. For services to Business and Charity.
- Professor Andrew Hopper, CBE, FRS, FREng. Treasurer and Vice-President, the Royal Society. For services to Computer Technology.
- Professor Peter William Horby. Professor, Emerging Infectious Diseases and Global Health, University of Oxford. For services to Medical Research.
- Antonio Mota De Sousa Horta-Osorio. Lately Chief Executive Officer, Lloyds Banking Group. For services to Financial Services and voluntary services to Mental Healthcare and to Culture.
- Dr. Michael Houghton. Director, Li Ka Shing Applied Virology Institute and Professor, Department of Medical Microbiology and Immunology, University of Alberta, Canada. For services to Medicine.
- Professor John Anderson Kay, CBE, FBA, FRSE. Economist. For services to Economics, Finance and Business.
- Professor Martin Jonathan Landray. Professor, Medicine and Epidemiology, Oxford University. For services to Public Health and Science.
- Anthony Joseph Lloyd (Tony Lloyd), MP. Member of Parliament for Rochdale. For public service.
- Roger Marsh, OBE, DL. Chair, NP11, Leeds City Region Local Enterprise Partnership and The Piece Hall Trust. For services to Business, to the Economy, and the community in Northern England.
- Dr. Michael Oliver McBride. Chief Medical Officer for Northern Ireland. For services to Public Health in Northern Ireland.
- Hamid Patel, CBE. Chief Executive Officer, Star Academies. For services to Education.
- Professor Andrew John Pollard. Professor, Paediatric Infection and Immunity, University of Oxford. For services to Public Health, particularly during the Covid-19 Pandemic.
- Jonathan Pryce, CBE. Actor. For services to Drama and Charity.
- Michael James Ryan, CBE. Vice President and General Manager Belfast, Spirit AeroSystems. For services to the Economy in Northern Ireland.
- Professor Keith Malcolm Willett, CBE. National Director for Emergency Planning and Incident Response, NHS England and NHS Improvement. For services to the NHS.

Knight Bachelor ribbon

=== Order of the Bath ===
Order of the Bath ribbon

==== Knight/Dame Commander of the Order of the Bath (KCB/DCB) ====
Military

- Admiral Antony David Radakin, CB, ADC
- General Timothy Buchan Radford, CB, DSO, OBE

Civil

- Elizabeth Anne Finlay Gardiner CB – First Parliamentary Counsel, Office of the Parliamentary Counsel. For services to Government and the Legislative Process
- Brenda Mary Sullivan (Brenda King) – Attorney General for Northern Ireland, lately First Legislative Counsel and Permanent Secretary, Northern Ireland Executive. For services to Constitutional Law
- Edward Christopher Ollard – Lately Clerk of the Parliaments, House of Lords. For services to Parliament

==== Companion of the Order of the Bath (CB) ====
Military

- Rear Admiral Andrew Paul Burns, OBE
- Rear Admiral Philip John Hally, MBE
- Lieutenant General Douglas McKenzie Chalmers, DSO, OBE
- Major General Neil David Sexton
- Air Vice-Marshal Simon David Ellard
- Air Vice-Marshal Warren Austin William James, CBE

Civil

- Carol Anne Bristow – Director, Individuals Policy Directorate, HM Revenue and Customs. For services to the UK Economy during Covid-19
- Neil William Couling CBE – Director General, Change and Resilience Group and Senior Responsible Officer, Universal Credit, Department for Work and Pensions. For services to Universal Credit
- Nicholas Karl Elliott MBE – Lately Director General, Vaccine Taskforce and lately Director General, Commercial, Defence Equipment and Support. For services to the Covid-19 Response
- Gareth Llywelyn Evans CBE – Deputy Director, Business, Energy and Industrial Strategy Legal Team, Government Legal Department. For services to the Law
- Wendy Anne Hardaker – Director, Commercial Law Group, Government Legal Department. For services to the Law
- Kate Margaret Josephs – Lately Director General, Cabinet Office. For public service
- Dr. David Bernard Kennedy CBE – Director General, Food, Farming and Animal and Plant Health, Department for Environment, Food and Rural Affairs. For public service particularly during the Covid-19 Pandemic
- Paul Michael Lincoln OBE – Director General, Border Force, Home Office. For services to Border Security
- Dr. Andrew Graham McCormick – Director General, International Relations, Northern Ireland Executive. For public service
- Kevin Charles Patrick McGinty CBE – Lately HM Chief Inspector of The Crown Prosecution Service. For public service
- Stephen Philip Oldfield – Director General, Chief Commercial Officer, Department of Health and Social Care. For services to EU Exit Preparedness and the Covid-19 Response
- Professor Guy Poppy – Lately Chief Scientific Adviser, Food Standards Agency and Professor of Ecology, University of Southampton. For services to Food Safety and Security
- Simon Allan Ridley – Director General, Cabinet Office. For public service
- Matthew John Taylor – Director General, Cabinet Office. For services to European Negotiations
- Helen Towers (Helen MacNamara) – Lately Deputy Cabinet Secretary, Cabinet Office. For public service
- Lindsey Jennifer Whyte – Director, Personal Tax, Welfare and Pensions. HM Treasury. For public service
- John Dominic Wilson – Director General Security Policy, Ministry of Defence. For services to Defence
- Daniel Byron York-Smith – Director, Strategy, Planning and Budget. HM Treasury. For public service

=== Order of St Michael and St George ===
Order of St Michael and St George ribbon

==== Knight Grand Cross of the Order of St Michael and St George (GCMG) ====
- The Right Honourable The Lord McDonald of Salford, KCMG, KCVO – former Permanent under Secretary, Foreign and Commonwealth Office. For services to British foreign policy.

==== Knight/Dame Commander of the Order of St Michael and St George (KCMG/DCMG) ====
- Jeremy Ian Fleming, CB, Director Government Communications Headquarters (GCHQ). For services to National Security.
- Roderick William Liddell, lately Registrar at the European Court of Human Rights, Strasbourg, France. For services to the protection of Human Rights in Europe.
- Professor Myles Antony Wickstead, CBE, Chair, Joffe Charitable Trust. For services to International Development.

==== Companion of the Order of St Michael and St George (CMG) ====
- George Alkiviades David, OBE, Chairman Emeritus, Coca Cola Hellenic Bottling Company and Chairman, Greek Committee, AG Leventis Foundation. For services to the knowledge and understanding in the UK of the Greek and Hellenic worlds.
- The Honourable Dr. Joseph Garcia, Deputy Chief Minister of Gibraltar. For services to Politics and Public Service in Gibraltar.
- Susannah Clare Goshko, former Principal Private Secretary to the Foreign Secretary. Foreign, Commonwealth and Development Office. For services to British foreign policy.
- Augustus James Ulysses Jaspert, lately Governor of the British Virgin Islands. For services to British foreign policy.
- Owen Jenkins, H.M. Ambassador Jakarta, Indonesia. For services to British foreign policy
- James Eugene McGoldrick, lately United Nations Assistant Secretary General, Deputy Special Coordinator for the Middle East Peace Process and Humanitarian Coordinator. For services to Humanitarian Relief overseas.
- Juliette Wilcox, Director, Foreign, Commonwealth and Development Office. For services to British foreign policy.
- Alison Dilys Margaret Williams, Legal Counsellor, Foreign, Commonwealth and Development Office. For services to British foreign policy.
- Graham Zebedee, Director Trade Policy Group, Department for International Trade. For services to International Trade and to Diplomacy.

=== Royal Victorian Order ===
Royal Victorian Order ribbon

==== Knight Commander of the Royal Victorian Order (KCVO) ====
- The Right Honourable The Lord Kirkham, CVO, lately Chairman of the Trustees, The Duke of Edinburgh's Award.
- Timothy Edwin Paul Stevenson, OBE, Lord-Lieutenant of Oxfordshire.
- Thomas Woodcock, CVO, DL, Garter Principal King of Arms.

==== Commander of the Royal Victorian Order (CVO) ====
- Andrew Jackson Coombe, Lord-Lieutenant of South Yorkshire.
- His Excellency the Honourable Paul de Jersey, AC, QC, Governor of Queensland, Australia.
- The Honourable Madeleine Mary Louloudis, LVO, Lady-in-Waiting to The Princess Royal.
- Sir Alan Parker, Chairman, The Duke of Edinburgh's Commonwealth Study Conferences.
- Desmond Philip Shawe-Taylor, LVO, lately Chief Surveyor and Surveyor of The Queen's Pictures, Royal Collection.
- Bridget Anne Wright, LVO, Bibliographer, Royal Library, Windsor Castle.

==== Lieutenant of the Royal Victorian Order (LVO) ====
- Rufus Benedict Godfrey Bird, lately Surveyor of The Queen's Works of Art, Royal Collection.
- Siobhan Caroline Brooks, MVO, Executive Assistant to The Prince of Wales.
- Michael John Field, MVO, Head of Display and Framing of Paintings, Royal Collection.
- Sir Crispin Hamlyn Agnew of Lochnaw, Bt., QC, Rothesay Herald of Arms, Court of the Lord Lyon.
- Dr. Arthur Grant Macgregor. For services to the Royal Collection.
- Robert Owen Roberts, MVO, Lieutenancy Officer for Cheshire.
- The Reverend John Hartley Tattersall, Chair of Court, The Royal Foundation of St Katharine.
- Toby David Zeegen, MVO, Head of IT Operations, Royal Household.

==== Member of the Royal Victorian Order (MVO) ====
- Claire Linzee Midgley-Adam, Deputy Gardens Manager, London Palaces, Royal Household.
- Julie Rachel Crocker, Senior Archivist, Royal Archives, Windsor Castle.
- Roselyn Eilidh Hamilton, Acting Official Secretary to the Governor of Western Australia.
- Dr. Kate Heard, Senior Curator of Prints and Drawings, Royal Collection.
- Debra Ann Heaton, Secretary to the Derbyshire Lieutenancy.
- Joanne Mary Holmes, Deputy Clerk to the Kent Lieutenancy.
- Beth Emma Wilkinson Clackett Jones, Collections Information Manager, Royal Collection.
- Craig Ernest Kitchen, Official Secretary to the Administrator of the Northern Territory of Australia.
- Pauline Theresa Macmillan, Personal Assistant to the Superintendent, Palace of Holyroodhouse.
- Emma Jane Probert, Sergeant, Metropolitan Police Service. For services to Royalty and Specialist Protection.
- Kevin James Scott, Private Secretary's Office, Royal Household.

=== Royal Victorian Medal (RVM) ===
Royal Victorian Medal ribbon

Silver – Bar

- Alister James Brown, RVM, lately Valley Gardens Team Superviser, Crown Estate, Windsor.
- Gordon Holliday Currie, RVM, lately Carpet Planner, Royal Household (To be dated 3 March 2021).
- Paul David Murray, RVM, Senior Storekeeper, Master of the Household's Department, Royal Household.

Silver

- Rosemary Elizabeth Croker, Warden, Palace of Holyroodhouse.
- John Rhys Davies, lately Messenger Sergeant Major, The Queen's Body Guard of the Yeomen of the Guard.
- Lorraine Susan Davies, lately Housekeeping Assistant, Master of the Household's Department, Royal Household.
- Carla Fulford, Assistant Visitor Services Manager, Windsor Castle.
- Alan Martin Grant. For services to the Royal Household.
- Cynthia Brainu-Hackman, lately Housekeeping Assistant, Clarence House.
- Craig Harley, Fire Safety and Access Officer, Buckingham Palace.
- Darren Noel Hill, Buildings Team Manager, Crown Estate, Windsor.
- Nicola Ann Joynes. For services to The Earl and Countess of Wessex.
- Julia Caryl Matthews, lately Savill Gardens Visitor Centre Assistant.
- Surinder-Pal Singh Mudhar, Constable, Metropolitan Police Service. For services to Royalty and Specialist Protection.
- Taisa Okanovic, House Attendant, Government House, Perth, Australia.
- Robert David Revell, Tractor Driver, Sandringham Estate.
- David Richard Seymour, Parks Team Leader, Crown Estate, Windsor.
- Justin Michael Spencer, Ticket Sales and Information Assistant, Royal Collection.
- Roland Stephen, Butcher, Windsor Farm Shop.

=== Order of the British Empire ===
Civil division ribbon

Military division ribbon

==== Knight Grand Cross of the Order of the British Empire (GBE) ====
Civil

- The Right Honourable The Earl Howe – Deputy Leader of the House of Lords, For political and parliamentary service

==== Knight/Dame Commander of the Order of the British Empire (KBE/DBE) ====
Military

- Lieutenant General Christopher Linley Tickell, CBE

Civil

- Professor Helen Valerie Atkinson, CBE, FREng. Pro-vice-chancellor, Aerospace, Transport and Manufacturing, Cranfield University. For services to Engineering and Education
- Professor Phyllida Barlow, CBE. Artist and Sculptor. For services to Art
- Catherine Elizabeth Bingham. Lately Chair, Vaccine Taskforce. For services to the Procurement, Manufacture and Distribution of Covid-19 Vaccines.
- Imogen Cooper CBE. Pianist. For services to Music.
- Professor Sarah Catherine Gilbert. Saïd Professorship of Vaccinology, Jenner Institute and Nuffield Department of Clinical Medicine. For services to Science and Public Health in Covid Vaccine Development.
- Margaret Olivia Hillier, MP. Member of Parliament for Hackney South and Shoreditch. For political and parliamentary service.
- Sandra Gayl Horley, CBE. Lately Chief Executive, Refuge. For services to the Prevention of Domestic Abuse and the Protection of Women and Children.
- The Right Honourable Andrea Jacqueline Leadsom, MP. Member of Parliament for South Northamptonshire. For political service.
- Prudence Margaret Leith, CBE, DL. Restaurateur and Television Presenter. For services to Food, to Broadcasting and to Charity.
- Sara Llewellin. Chief Executive Officer, Barrow Cadbury Trust. For services to Social Justice.
- Professor Caroline Jan MacEwen. Lately Chair, Academy of Medical Royal Colleges. For services to Ophthalmology and Healthcare Leadership during the Covid-19 Response.
- Arlene Phillips, CBE. Choreographer. For services to Dance and Charity.
- Maura Regan, OBE. Chief Executive Officer, Bishop Hogarth Catholic Education Trust. For services to Education.
- Anne Helen Richards, CVO, CBE, FRSE. For services to Financial Services, to Women, to Education and to Science.

Honorary

==== Commander of the Order of the British Empire (CBE) ====
Military

- Commodore Robert James Astley Bellfield
- Rear Admiral Matthew Briers
- Surgeon Captain John Sharpley
- Colonel Jeremy David Bagshaw
- Brigadier James Matthew Senior
- Brigadier Sara Louise Sharkey
- Colonel Graham Taylor
- Group Captain Daniel James
- Group Captain Adam Boyd Wardrope, DFC
- Group Captain Katherine Patricia Wilson, OBE

Civil

- Caroline Susan Abrahams. Charity Director, Age UK. For services to the Voluntary Sector and Older People during Covid-19.
- Michael Adamson. Chief Executive, British Red Cross. For services to the Humanitarian Sector and the Red Cross Movement.
- Professor Jameel Sadik Al-Khalili, OBE, FRS. Professor of Physics and Professor of Public Engagement in Science, University of Surrey. For services to Science and Public Engagement in STEM.
- Professor Robert John Allison. Vice-chancellor, Loughborough University. For services to Higher Education.
- Conrad Winter Bailey. Lately Director, Covid-19, Department for Transport. For public service.
- Susan Barker, OBE. Sport Commentator. For services to Sport, Broadcasting and Charity.
- Oliver Benzecry. Chairman, Accenture, UK and Ireland. For services to the Economy.
- Canon Professor Nigel John Biggar. Regius Professor of Moral and Pastoral Theology, Oxford University. For services to Higher Education.
- Kathryn Ann Bishop. For services to Diversity and Public Administration.
- Lady Perdita Maureen Blackwood. For services to Disabled Young People and Charity in Northern Ireland.
- Sophie Clodagh Mary Blain (Sophie Andreae). For services to Heritage.
- Paul Booth, OBE. Chair, Tees Valley Local Enterprise Partnership. For services to Business and the Economy.
- Crawford Lindsay Simpson Boswell. Chief Executive Officer, FareShare. For services to charitable Food Provision during Covid-19.
- Antony John Bourne OBE. Director, Department for Environment, Food and Rural Affairs. For services to EU Exit.
- David Edward Boyle. Chief Executive Officer, Dunraven Educational Trust, Lambeth. For services to Education.
- David Bryan. Chair, Board of Trustees, Voluntary Arts, Chair, Battersea Arts Centre and Chair, Brixton House. For services to the Arts.
- Margaret Yvonne Busby, OBE. Publisher, Editor, Writer and Broadcaster. For services to Publishing.
- Paul Henry Cackette. Director, Outbreak Control Management. For services to the Scottish Government.
- Lauren Margot Peachy Child, MBE. Children's Author and Illustrator. For services to Children's Literature.
- Mary Helen Creagh. Lately Member of Parliament for Wakefield. For Parliamentary and Political Services.
- Michael Cunningham, QPM. Lately Chief Executive Officer, College of Policing. For services to Policing and public service.
- David Alan Ezra Dangoor, DL. For services to the community in Greater London.
- Edmund Arthur Lowndes de Waal, OBE. Potter and Writer. For services to the Arts.
- Julie Deane, OBE. Founder and Chief Executive Officer, The Cambridge Satchel Company. For services to Entrepreneurship and Manufacturing.
- Professor John Eric Deanfield. Director, National Institute of Cardiovascular Outcomes Research, and Senior Adviser to Public Health England. For services to the Prevention and Treatment of Heart Disease.
- Michael Alexander Frederik Des Tombe. Deputy Director, Government Legal Department. For public service.
- Paul John Vincent Devine. Director, Security and Resilience. For services to Defence.
- Susan Frances Douglas. Chief Executive Officer, Eden Academy Trust, and Senior Adviser, Schools, British Council. For services to Education.
- Andrew Martin Duffell, OBE. Head of Dealing Desk, UK Debt Management Office. For services to Public Finance.
- Samantha Ede. Deputy Director, Home Office Legal Advisers, Government Legal Department. For services to the Law.
- Professor Paul Elliott. Professor, Epidemiology and Public Health Medicine, Imperial College London. For services to Scientific Research in Public Health.
- William Stephen Ferris, OBE, DL. Lately Chief Executive, Chatham Historic Dockyard Trust. For services to Heritage.
- Kenneth Brian Frampton. For services to Architecture.
- Professor Alissa Tamar Goodman. Professor of Economics, and Director, Centre for Longitudinal Studies, University College London. For services to Social Science.
- Dr. Philippa Gregory. For services to Literature and Charity in the UK and The Gambia.
- Martin Patrick Griffiths, DL. Consultant Vascular and Trauma Surgeon, Barts Health NHS Trust. For services to Healthcare.
- Christopher Douglas Hall. Deputy Chief Commercial Officer, Government Commercial Function, Cabinet Office. For public service.
- Dr. Norman Harrison. Lately Non-Executive Director, UK Atomic Energy Authority. For services to Fusion and the Nuclear Industry.
- Roy Hodgson. Lately Manager, Crystal Palace Football Club. For services to Football.
- John Wesley Holder (Ram John Holder). Actor and Musician. For services to Drama and Music.
- Emma Howard Boyd. Chair, Environment Agency. For services to the Environment.
- Gay Huey Evans, OBE. For services to the Economy and Philanthropy.
- David Kenneth Hunt. Head of Vaccine Operations, AstraZeneca. For services to UK Healthcare and the Covid-19 Response.
- Antony Peter Jenkins. Chair, Institute for Apprenticeships and Technical Education. For services to Business.
- Lee John-Charles. Deputy Legal Director, Litigation, Government Legal Department. For services to the Law.
- Martin William Jones. Chief Executive, Parole Board for England and Wales. For services to Victims, Diversity and Transparency within the Parole Process.
- Lulu Kennedy-Cairns, OBE. For services to Music, Entertainment and Charity.
- Susan Kerins (Susan Taylor). Lately Deputy Director, Residential and Accommodation Support Services Division, HM Prison and Probation Service. For public service.
- Oluwole Olatunde Kolade. Managing Partner, Livingbridge. For services to Financial Services.
- Shelagh Jane Legrave, OBE. Chief Executive Officer, Chichester College Group. For services to Education.
- Oliver Aneurin Lewis. For Public and Political Service.
- Anne Elizabeth Longfield, OBE. Lately Children's Commissioner for England. For services to Children.
- Dr. Adam Jay Bressler Marshall. Lately Director General, British Chambers of Commerce. For services to Business. (London, Greater London)
- Dr. Richard Peter Marshall. Senior Vice President, Late Phase Development, Respiratory and Immunology, AstraZeneca. For services to UK Science and the Covid-19 Response.
- Bruce Marshall. Ministry of Defence Lead for Assistance to NHS England in Personal Protective Equipment Procurement. For public service particularly during Covid-19.
- Ian McCubbin, OBE. Manufacturing Expert on Steering Committee, Vaccine Taskforce. For services to Life Sciences.
- Sarah Kristen McFee (Kristen McLeod). Director, Office for Life Sciences. For services to the Life Sciences Sector.
- John Walter McNairney. Chief Planner, Scottish Government. For public service.
- Professor Fiona Catherine McQueen. Lately Chief Nursing Officer for Scotland. For services to the NHS in Scotland.
- Kenneth Blair Muir. For services to Education particularly during the Covid-19 Pandemic.
- Professor Chuka Uchemefuna Nwokolo. Consultant Gastroenterologist, University Hospitals Coventry and Warwickshire NHS Trust. For services to the NHS and Medical Research.
- Martin Parr. Documentary Photographer. For services to Photography.
- Dr. Helen Samantha Parrett, OBE. Chief Executive Officer and Executive Principal, London South East Education Group. For services to Education.
- Emma Laetitia Pell (Emma Squire). Director, Arts Heritage and Tourism, Department for Digital, Culture, Media and Sport. For services to Heritage and the Arts during Covid-19.
- Colin Christopher Perry. Director, Economy, Northern Ireland Office. For services to EU Exit, Transition and Legacy.
- Damian Piper. Deputy Director, Ministry of Defence. For services to Defence.
- Mark Proctor. Global Supply and Strategy Senior Director (Covid Vaccine), AstraZeneca. For services to the Covid-19 Response.
- Emma Victoria Reed. Director, Emergency Response and Health Protection, Department of Health and Social Care. For public service particularly during the Covid-19 Response.
- Nicholas David Ross. Broadcaster. For services to broadcasting, Charity and Crime Prevention.
- Michael Graham Rowe. Director, Marine and Fisheries, Department for Environment, Food and Rural Affairs. For services to the EU Exit and International Trade.
- Clive Selley. Chief Executive, Openreach. For services to Telecommunications during Covid-19.
- Professor Thomas William Shakespeare. Professor, Disability Research, International Centre for Evidence in Disability, London School of Hygiene and Tropical Medicine. For services to Disability Research.
- Dr. Jonathan Paul Sheffield OBE. Lately Chief Executive Officer, Clinical Research Network, National Institute for Health Research. For services to Medical Research particularly during the Covid-19 Response.
- Nigel Vernon Short. For services to the Economy in Wales. (Whitland, Carmarthenshire)
- Professor Sally Ann Shuttleworth. Professor of English Literature, University of Oxford. For services to the Study of English Literature.
- Professor Thomas Solomon. Chair of Neurological Science, University of Liverpool. For services to Neurological and Emerging Infections Research.
- Denise Anne Spence. For services to Girlguiding and to Public Service. (Bonnyrigg, Midlothian)
- Professor Roy Archibald Joseph Spence, OBE, JP. Consultant Surgeon, Belfast Health and Social Care Trust. For services to Healthcare in Northern Ireland.
- Amanda Penelope Sunderland. Lately Chief Nurse, Nottingham University Hospitals NHS Trust. For services to Nursing.
- Professor William James Sutherland. Miriam Rothschild Professor of Conservation Biology, University of Cambridge. For services to Evidence-based Conservation.
- Professor Evelyn Elizabeth Telfer. Professor, Reproductive Biology, University of Edinburgh. For services to Female Reproductive Biology.
- Lynda Margaret Thomas (Lynda Branch). Chief Executive Officer, Macmillan. For services to Charity.
- Ruth Anne Llewellin Todd. Director of Programmes, Vaccine Taskforce, Department for Business, Energy and Industrial Strategy. For services to Vaccine Delivery.
- Professor Fiona Tomley. Professor of Experimental Parasitology, The Royal Veterinary College. For services to Animal Health.
- Christopher Peter Townsend, OBE. For services to Clinically Vulnerable People during the Covid-19 Response.
- Katherine Sarah Waddington. For services to Public Relations and Voluntary Sectors.
- Richard Christopher Wakeman. Musician, Presenter and Author. For services to Music and Broadcasting.
- Kresse Ann-Marie Wesling, MBE. Founder and Chief Executive Officer, Elvis & Kresse Ltd. For services to Sustainable Business.
- Juliette Marie White. Vice President, Global SHE (Safety, Health and Environment) and Sustainability, AstraZeneca plc. For services to Life Sciences and the Medical Supply Chain.
- Karin Lee Woodley. Chief Executive, Cambridge House. For services to Social Justice.

Honorary

==== Officer of the Order of the British Empire (OBE) ====
Military

- Lieutenant Colonel Richard Alston
- Commander Andrew Horlock
- Lieutenant Colonel James Austin Ellery Lewis
- Commander Steven McAllister
- Commander Christopher Moorey
- Commander Alan Neil Lawrence Michael Nekrews, QGM
- Commander (now Captain) Suzi Nielsen
- Major (Acting Lieutenant Colonel) Gregory George Andrews, MBE. Corps of Royal Engineers, Army Reserve
- Lieutenant Colonel Robert John Trevelyan Cloke. Intelligence Corps
- Lieutenant Colonel Elizabeth Anne Stratton Fieldhouse. Royal Army Medical Corps
- Lieutenant Colonel Shamus Antony Kelly. Royal Regiment of Fusiliers
- Lieutenant Colonel David Thomas Pack, MBE. Royal Gurkha Rifles
- Colonel Daniel Michael Rea
- Lieutenant Colonel Dylan Read. Royal Logistic Corps
- Major Christopher Mark Roberts. Royal Army Physical Training Corps
- Chaplain to the Forces (1st Class) Reverend Andrew James Totten, MBE
- Wing Commander Robert Edward Braybrook
- Wing Commander Andrew Coe
- Wing Commander (now Group Captain) Gerard John Julian Currie
- Wing Commander (now Group Captain) Mark George Jackson
- Wing Commander Robert James Lindfield
- Squadron Leader Martin Elliott Wallace Pert

Civil

- Marc Lee Abraham. Veterinary Surgeon. For services to Animal Welfare.
- Professor Marios Adamou. Consultant Psychiatrist, South West Yorkshire Partnership NHS Foundation Trust. For services to Mental Health.
- Sarah Lea Adcock. For services to EU Exit and International Trade.
- Adetokunbo Temitope Adesuyan. Senior District Crown Prosecutor, Crown Prosecution Service, London. For services to Law and Order.
- Rimla Akhtar, MBE. Co-founder, Muslim Women in Sport Network. For services to Equality and Diversity in Sport.
- Vidhya Alakeson. Chief Executive, Power to Change Trust. For services to Social Equality.
- Eleanor Deanne Therese Alberga. Composer and Pianist. For services to Music.
- Justin Thomas Albert. For services to the Historic and Natural Environment in Wales.
- David Almond. Children's Author. For services to Literature.
- Jonathan Beesley Bache, JP. Lately Chair, Magistrates' Association. For services to the Magistracy and the Administration of Justice.
- Peter Ambrose Barber. For services to Architecture.
- Kristina Louise Barnett. Chief Executive Officer, ICE Benevolent Fund. For services to Civil Engineers and their Families.
- Dr. Sara Penelope Barratt. Chief Executive Officer, The Bridge London Trust. For services to Education.
- Professor Michael Barrett. Laboratory Director, Lighthouse Laboratory, Glasgow. For services to the NHS during the Covid-19 Pandemic.
- Professor Linda Caroline Bauld. Bruce and John Usher Professor of Public Health, University of Edinburgh. For services to Guiding Public Health Response to and Public Understanding of Covid-19
- Theresa Ann Beattie. For services to Dance and to Dancers.
- Susan Bell. Founder, Chief Executive Officer and Clinical Director, Kids Inspire. For services to Charity, Mental Health Provision and Education.
- Terence Bendixson. President Emeritus, Living Streets. For services to Walking.
- Allan MacDonald Bennett. Head of Biosafety, Air and Water Microbiology Group, Public Health England. For services to Microbiology in the Covid-19 Response.
- Professor Michael Benton, FRS, FRSE. Professor of Vertebrate Palaeontology, University of Bristol. For services to Palaeontology and to Community Engagement.
- Hannah Kate Bernard. Head of Business Banking, Barclays. For services to Financial Services during Covid-19.
- Samantha Birch. Senior Adviser, First Deputy Minister, Afghan Ministry of Interior. For services to International Defence Relations.
- Maurizio Bragagni. For services to Business and voluntary political service.
- Dr. Rachel Elizabeth Bragg. Academic Researcher and Manager, Care Farming Development. For services to Academia and Green Care.
- Charles Antony Elliott Braithwaite. For political service in the North East of England.
- Lucy Brazier. Chief Executive Officer, Marcham Publishing. For services to Office Professionals.
- Dr. Mark Stephen John Broadmeadow. Principal Adviser, Climate Change, Forestry Commission. For services to Forestry.
- Dr. Ellen Brooks Pollock. Senior Lecturer, Disease Modelling and Veterinary Public Health, University of Bristol. For services to the Scientific Pandemic Influenza Group on Modelling and SAGE during the Covid-19 Response.
- Colonel (Retired) Alison Kay Brown. Vice President and Chair of Trustees, the Women's Royal Army Corps Association. For voluntary service to Veterans.
- Alexander David Michael Bruce. Founder, The Bruce Trust and lately President, The Kennet and Avon Canal Trust. For services to Charity.
- William Burdett-Coutts. Founder and Director, Assembly Festival, and lately Artistic Director, Riverside Studios. For services to Theatre, Comedy and the Arts.
- William John Casimir Burgon. Deputy Director, Cabinet Office. For public service.
- Roma Burnett (Roma Downey). For services to the Arts, Drama and to the community in Northern Ireland.
- Simon Edward Burton. Special Adviser to the Government Chief Whip. For political and public service.
- Catherine Campbell. For services to the Harris Tweed Industry and Economy on the Isle of Harris.
- Anna Carragher. For services to the Arts in Northern Ireland.
- Hilary Carty Bing-Pappoe. Director, Clore Leadership. For services to Leadership Development in the Cultural and Creative Industries.
- Paul Martin Caskey. Head of Campaign, Integrated Education Fund. For services to Education in Northern Ireland.
- Professor Jagjit Singh Chadha. Director, National Institute of Economic and Social Research. For services to Economics and Economic Policy.
- Lolita Chakrabarti. Actress and Writer. For services to Drama.
- Professor Suzanne Cholerton. Pro-vice-chancellor, Newcastle University. For services to Higher Education.
- Professor Martin Graham Christopher. Emeritus Professor of Marketing and Logistics, Cranfield School of Management, Cranfield University. For services to Business, Academia and the UK Economy.
- Dr. Frederick Andrew Clements. Lately Chief Executive Officer, British Trust for Ornithology. For services to Conservation and Policy.
- Sadie Coles. Gallerist. For services to Art.
- Mhairi Helen Stewart Collie. Colorectal Surgeon, Colorectal Surgery Unit, Edinburgh. For services to Surgery in relation to Child Birth Injury, in Sub-Saharan Africa.
- John Freeman Collins. Chief Legal and Regulatory Officer, Santander. For services to Financial Services during Covid-19.
- Professor Timothy Mark Cook. Consultant in Anaesthesia and Intensive Care Medicine, Royal United Hospitals Bath NHS Foundation Trust. For services to Anaesthesia during Covid-19.
- Alan Charles Coppin. Lately Chair, Sports Grounds Safety Authority. For services to Safety in Sport.
- James Arthur Coppin. Executive Director, UK Government Investments. For services to the Vaccine Taskforce.
- Dr. Melanie Dawn Cross (Melanie Dawn Crawford). Doctor and Clinical Lead Respiratory Medicine, Forth Valley. For services to Respiratory Medicine.
- Charlotte Louise Crosswell. Lately Chief Executive Officer, Innovate Finance. For services to Financial Services.
- Jeremy Nigel Dale. Founder, SeaSafe. For services to Maritime Safety.
- Luol Ajou Deng. For services to Basketball.
- Jackie Driver. Chair, Board of Trustees, SignHealth and Chair, Breakthrough. For services to Hearing Impaired People, Equality, Diversity and Inclusion.
- Deborah Anne Dyer. Singer, Songwriter and Author. For services to Music.
- Joanna Mary Dyson. Head of Food, FareShare. For services to charitable Food Provision during Covid-19.
- Roger Bernard Eaton. For charitable and voluntary services.
- Dr. Cathryn Mary Edwards. Lately President, British Society of Gastroenterology. For services to Medicine.
- Dr. Emma Katherine Egging (Emma Poulter). Founder, the Jon Egging Trust. For services to Vulnerable Young People.
- Fadi El-Itani. Chief Executive Officer, Muslim Charities Forum. For services to Charity and Interfaith Relations during Covid-19.
- Professor Mark Emberton. Professor of Interventional Oncology, University College London. For services to Prostate Cancer Research.
- Carolyn English. Secondary Director, Harris Federation. For services to Education.
- Thomas Evans. Chief Executive, Labour Relations Agency. For services to Employment Relations in Northern Ireland.
- Brian George Ewing. Lately Director, Institute of Sport and Exercise, University of Dundee. For services to Sport and Higher Education.
- Oliver Benjamin Excell. Project Manager, Vaccine Taskforce. For services to Government during the Covid-19 Response.
- Professor Christopher James Alfred Granville Fairburn. Emeritus Professor of Psychiatry, University of Oxford. For services to Psychological Treatments and theTreatment of Eating Disorders.
- Jennifer Field. Deputy Director, City Bridge Trust, City of London. For services to Disadvantaged communities in London.
- Dr. Shaun David Fitzgerald, FREng. Director, Centre for Climate Repair, University of Cambridge. For services to the Covid-19 Response.
- Charles David Forbes-Adam, DL. For Charitable Fundraising.
- David Forbes-Nixon. Co-founder, Stepping Stones Special School, Undershaw, Hindhead, Surrey. For services to Children and Adults with Special Educational Needs and Disabilities.
- Ronald Moncrieff Foreman. For services to the Economy in Northern Ireland.
- Paul Jonathan Fox. Lately Chief Operating Officer, Natural Environment Research Council. For services to Scientific Research.
- Susan Elizabeth Freestone, DL. For services to Education and the community in Cambridgeshire.
- Audrey Gallacher. Deputy Chief Executive, Energy UK. For services to the Energy Industry and Energy Consumers.
- Sarah Jemima Gilbert. Director of Transformation, Healthy London Partnership. For services to Healthcare in London during Covid-19.
- Emma Ace Gladstone. Lately Artistic Director and Chief Executive, Dance Umbrella. For services to Dance.
- Neil Glendinning. Chief Executive Officer, Harwich Haven Authority. For services to the Transport of Freight particularly during the Covid-19 Response.
- Myer Glickman. Analyst, Office for National Statistics. For services to Health Analysis.
- Helen Golightly. Chief Executive, North East Local Enterprise Partnership. For services to Business and the Regional Economy.
- Peter John Goodman, QPM. Lately Chief Constable, Derbyshire Constabulary. For services to Policing and Prevention of Cybercrime.
- Peter James Gough. Principal Adviser Fisheries, Natural Resources Wales. For services to Sustainable Fisheries Management.
- Christopher Grant. Board Member, Sport England. For services to Sport.
- Theresa Grant. Chief Executive, Northamptonshire County Council. For services to Local Government and the Public Sector.
- Dr. Catherine Mary Green. Head, Clinical BioManufacturing Facility, Nuffield Department of Medicine, University of Oxford. For services to Science and Public Health.
- Paul Griffiths. Chief Superintendent, President of the Police Superintendents' Association. For services to Policing.
- Dr. Catherine Mary Haddon. Senior Fellow, Institute for Government. For services to the Constitution.
- Simon Christopher Hall. Deputy Director, Transition Planning, Department for International Trade. For services to International Trade and public service.
- John Leo Hardy. Headteacher, St John Vianney RCPrimary School, Hartlepool. For services to Education.
- Claudia Lindsay Harris. Lately Chief Executive Officer, The Careers and Enterprise Company. For services to Careers Education.
- Jacqueline Marie Hart. Deputy Director, HR Business Partners and International HR, Department for International Trade. For services to International Trade.
- Anne Isobel Henderson. Chair, Parades Commission for Northern Ireland. For public service and to Peacekeeping in Northern Ireland.
- Rebecca Hewitt (Rebecca Hutt). Lately Chief Executive Officer, Changing Faces. For services to People with Visible Differences.
- Derek Hillier. Team Leader, Ministry of Defence. For services to Defence.
- Professor Alison Helen Holmes. Adviser to the NHS, Government, WHO and SAGE. For services to Medicine and Infectious Diseases particularly during Covid-19.
- Professor William Winima Denbeigh Hope. Director, Centre of Excellence in Infectious Disease Research. For services to Infectious Diseases Research during the Covid-19 Pandemic.
- Alexandra Louise Hoskyn. Founder, The Chatty Café Scheme. For services to Tackling Loneliness during Covid-19.
- Dr. Janice Howkins. Chief Executive Officer, Bentley Wood Trust. For services to Education.
- Ian Donald Hudspeth. Lately Leader, Oxfordshire County Council and lately Chairman, Community Wellbeing Board, Local Government Association. For services to Local Government.
- William Francis Graham Hunter, JP. For services to the Economy and the community in County Londonderry.
- Roland Alexander Ilube. Vice President, Finance Marketing, Downstream, Shell UK. For services to Diversity and Inclusion.
- Professor Helen James. Deputy Vice-chancellor, Canterbury Christ Church University. For services to Higher Education.
- Andrew Richard Jennings. Global Retail Adviser. For services to International Trade, Fashion and Retail.
- Sharmin Joarder. Director, Business Readiness, Cabinet Office. For public service.
- Rachel Anne Jones. Group Director, South West Universal Credit Operations, Department for Work and Pensions. For services to Unemployed People during Covid-19.
- Martin Philip Jones. Lately Deputy Director and Negotiations Adviser, EU Transition Division, Department for Transport. For public service.
- Brendan Joseph Keaney. Chief Executive, DanceEast. For services to Dance.
- Professor Matthew James Keeling. Professor, Mathematics Institute and School of Life Sciences, University of Warwick. For services to SAGE during the Covid-19 Response.
- Lucy Kellaway. Co-founder, Now Teach. For services to Education.
- Andrew Cameron Kerr. For services to the Public Sector.
- Javed Akhter Khan. Chief Executive Officer, Barnado's. For services to Young People and to Education.
- Adnan Khan. Team Leader, Ministry of Defence. For services to Defence.
- Margaret Isobel Bernadette Kincade. Senior Officer, Tax Specialist, HM Revenue and Customs. For services to the Taxation of the Oil Industry.
- Lisa Catherine King. Director of Communications and External Relations, Refuge. For services to Victims of Domestic Abuse.
- Gareth Kirkwood. Managing Director of Roadside, The AA. For services to Road Transport during Covid-19.
- Dr. Amanda Leach. Global Clinical Head, AstraZeneca. For services to Medical Science and the Covid-19 Response.
- Dominic Anthony Leeds. Lead IT Architect, Defence Equipment and Support. For services to Defence.
- Keith Mark Lever. Chief Executive Officer, Helpforce. For services to volunteering during Covid-19.
- Ben Davies Levinson. Headteacher, Kensington Primary School, Newham. For services to Education.
- Professor Julian Lloyd Webber. Cellist. For services to Music.
- Jayne Lowe. Managing Director and Education Adviser, Bright Green Learning. For services to Education.
- Marian Mahoney. Head of Reconfiguration, Ministry of Justice. For services to HM Prison and Probation Service and the Criminal Justice System.
- Divya Chadha Manek. Clinical Trials, Workstream Lead, Vaccine Taskforce. For services to Government during the Covid-19 Response.
- Mohan Mansigani. Trustee, St John Ambulance. For charitable services to Healthcare.
- Dr. Fiona Angela Olinda Marston. Entrepreneur in Residence, Liverpool School of Tropical Medicine. For services to the Response to the Covid-19 Pandemic.
- Anthony David Williams Mcardle, TD. Lead Commissioner, Northamptonshire County Council. For services to Local Government and public service.
- Francis McCarron. Lately Principal, Stockport Academy. For services to Education.
- Paul John Mceldon. For services to Local Growth in the North East of England.
- Dr. Daniel Frederick McGonigle. Systems Research Lead, Department for Environment, Food and Rural Affairs. For services to Science and Operations in the Response to Covid-19.
- Paula Catherine McGowan. Campaigner. For services to People with Autism and Learning Disabilities.
- Dr. John Anderson McLean. Lately Head, Microelectronics Support Centre, Rutherford Appleton Laboratory. For services to Pan-European Microelectronics Design Tools Provision for Academia.
- Robin Stevenson McLoughlin. Principal, Banbridge Academy. For services to Education.
- Professor Jane Memmott. Professor of Ecology, University of Bristol. For services to Insect Pollinators and Ecology.
- Daniel Mendoza. Chair of Trustees, The Anne Frank Trust UK. For services to Education in Challenging Prejudice and Discrimination.
- Paul Julian Mogg. For services to Policing.
- Dr. Brendan Mooney. Chief Executive Officer, Kainos. For services to the Local Economy.
- Ian Lyn David Morrison. Director of Policy and Evidence, Historic England. For services to Heritage and Covid-19 Response.
- Rachael Elaine Moses. Consultant Physiotherapist, NHS England. For services to the NHS.
- Dr. Janet Moyles. Professor Emeritus, Anglia Ruskin University, Hampshire. For services to Education.
- Karen Michelle Mullin. Senior Crown Prosecutor, Crown Prosecution Service, Wales. For services to Law and Order.
- Peter Gerald Stewart Murray. For services to Leadership in the Arts, Architecture, City Planning, Design, Publication and Charity.
- Tracy Clare Myhill. Lately Chief Executive, Swansea Bay University Health Board and Welsh Ambulance Service. For service to NHS Wales.
- Michael Stephen Nankivell. Chair, Air Conditioning and Refrigeration Industry Board, Fgas Implementation Group. For services to the UK Refrigeration and Air-Conditioning Industry.
- Michael Andrew Newman. Chief Executive, the Association of Jewish Refugees. For services to Holocaust Remembrance and Education.
- Dr. Kerri Neylon. Deputy Medical Director for Primary Care, NHS Greater Glasgow and Clyde. For services to Health and Social Care particularly during Covid-19.
- Elaine Susan Orton. Chief Executive, NHS Charities Together. For services to the NHS during Covid-19.
- Stephen Page. Chief Executive Officer, Faber and Faber Publishing House. For services to Publishing.
- Professor Rose Marie Parr. Lately Chief Pharmaceutical Officer for Scotland. For services to Pharmacy and Pharmaceutical Education.
- Alan Parsons. Studio Engineer, Songwriter, Musician and Producer. For services to Music and Music Production.
- Professor Gerald John Pillay, DL. Vice-chancellor, Liverpool Hope University. For services to Higher Education.
- Professor Joanna Margaret Pritchard, MBE. For services to Social Enterprise, Health and Social Care.
- Alexia Jane Quin. Founder and Director, Music as Therapy International. For services to Music Therapy.
- Jasvinder Singh Rai. Founder and Chairman, Sikh Recovery Network. For services to the Sikh community during the Covid-19 Pandemic.
- Michael Robert Ramsey. Technical Expert, Chemical, Biological, Radiological, Nuclear and Explosive, Office of Security and Counter Terrorism, Home Office. For services to Public Protection.
- Victoria Anne Rayner. Chief Executive Officer, National Care Forum. For services to Social Care.
- Aislinn Maye Ellen Rea. Member, Taskforce Europe. For services to EU Negotiations.
- Christine Mary Reekie (Christine McLoughlin). Director, Children Services, Stockport Metropolitan Borough Council. For services to Children and Families.
- Edward Stephen Rees. Vice President, Discovery Biology Department, AstraZeneca. For services to UK Science and the Covid-19 Response.
- Arlin John Rickard. Lately Chief Executive, Rivers Trust. For services to the Natural Environment.
- Dr. Ian Arthur Robinson. Fellow in Electrical Metrology, National Physical Laboratory. For services to Measurement Science.
- Johann Lesley Robinson. Chief Executive Officer, British Marine. For services to the Leisure Marine Sector.
- Martin Robinson. For services to Law Enforcement.
- Mark Nicholas Robinson. Founder, Radio Feltham and Founder and Trustee, The Prison Radio Association. For services to HM Prison and Probation Service and Offenders.
- Nicola Ross. Team Leader, Ministry of Defence. For services to Defence.
- Professor Kathy Rowan. Director, Intensive Care National Audit and Research Centre. For services to Research and Intensive Care.
- Dr. Elizabeth Rowsell. Research and Development Director, Johnson Matthey. For services to Chemistry, Commercialisation and Promoting Diversity in STEM.
- Alexander Murray Russell. Chief Executive Officer, Bourne Education Trust. For services to Education.
- Veronica Ryan. Sculptor. For services to Art.
- Dr. Quentin Dudley Sandifer. Lately Executive Director of Public Health Services and Medical Director of Public Health Wales. For services to Public Health in Wales particularly during the Covid-19 Response.
- Justin Andrew Sargent. For services to the community in Somerset.
- Clare Sealy. Lately Headteacher, St Matthias Primary School, Tower Hamlets. For services for Education.
- Syed Naeem Pasha Shah. Head of Engagement, People, Places and Communities Division, Ministry of Housing, Communities and Local Government. For services to Faith Communities.
- Professor Clifford Paul Shearman. Consultant, Vascular Surgery, University of Southampton. For services to Vascular Surgery.
- Professor Rebecca Julia Shipley. Professor, Healthcare Engineering, University College London. For services to the Development of the Continuous Positive Airways Pressure Device during the Pandemic Nationally and Internationally.
- Kelly Simmons, MBE. Director, Women's Professional Game, Football Association. For services to Women's Football.
- Sharon Annette Simons (Sharon Blackman). Managing Director and General Counsel, Citi. For services to the Financial Sector.
- Kevin Sinfield, MBE. Director of Rugby, Leeds Rhinos. For services to Rugby League Football and Charitable Fundraising.
- Jasjyot Singh. Managing Director, Consumer and Business Banking, Lloyds Banking Group. For services to Financial Services during Covid-19.
- Sumita Singha. For services to Architecture.
- Dr. Andrea Mae Siodmok. Lately Deputy Director, Policy Lab and Open Innovation Team, Policy Innovation Unit, Cabinet Office. For public service.
- Dr. Gavin Mark Siriwardena. Head of Terrestrial Ecology, British Trust for Ornithology. For services to Biodiversity in the UK.
- Lemn Sissay, MBE. Poet and Playwright. For services to Literature and Charity.
- Christopher Paul Skeith. Chief Executive Officer, Association of Event Organisers. For services to the Events Industry during Covid-19.
- Myles Jerome Stacey. For voluntary and charitable services to the Black community during the Covid-19 Response.
- John David Steele. Lately Chair, English Institute of Sport. For services to Sport.
- Colin Jeffrey Stewart. Area Director, Work and Health Services, Department for Work and Pensions. For services to the Department for Work and Pensions.
- John Heath Summers. Chief Executive Officer, Hallé Orchestra. For services to Music and Education.
- Robin Neville Tate. Lately Headteacher, Yarm School, Teesside. For services to Education.
- Janet Thomas. Lately Head of Public Protection, Directorate of Reducing Reoffending, National Probation Service, North West. For services to Probation.
- Bernadette June Emitayo Thompson. Deputy Director, People, Capability and Change, Ministry for Housing Communities and Local Government. For services to Diversity and Inclusion.
- Andrew Tilden. Lately Director of Operations, Skills for Care. For services to Social Work.
- Dr. Christopher Martin Timperley. Fellow, Chemistry and Operational Readiness Group, Defence Science and Technology Laboratory. For services to UK Defence and Security.
- Wendy Tomes. Lately Chief Executive Officer, Sidney Stringer Multi Academy Trust. For services to Education.
- Susannah Elizabeth Turner. Lately Chief Executive Officer, Quartet Community Foundation. For services to Social Justice.
- Richard Turner. Research and Development Director, AstraZeneca. For services to Pharmaceutical Manufacture and the Covid-19 Response.
- Dr. Emma Clare Vaux. Consultant Nephrologist and General Physician, Royal Berkshire NHS Foundation Trust. For services to Medical Education.
- Michael Volpe. Founder and lately General Manager, Opera Holland Park. For services to Opera.
- Patricia Lynn Watson. Chair, Ascent Trust. For services to Special Educational Needs.
- Alan Watson. For services to Law Enforcement.
- Duncan Graham Whitfield. Strategic Director of Finance and Governance, London Borough of Southwark. For services to Local Government.
- Timothy Charles Willbond, DL. Vice Chairman, North of England Reserve Forces and Cadets Association. For services to the Reserve Forces and Cadets Association.
- Professor Hywel Charles Williams. Director, National Institute for Health Research Health Technology Assessment. For services to Higher Education and Medical Research.
- Nigel Jonathan Wood. Lately Chief Executive, Rugby League International Federation. For services to Rugby League Football.
- Professor James Lionel Norman Wood. Head, Veterinary Medicine, University of Cambridge. For services to Veterinary Science.
- Paul Duncan Yates. Governor, HM Prison Lincoln. For services to Her Majesty's Prison and Probation Service, Reducing Reoffending and Public Protection.
- Anna Marie Yearley. Joint Executive Director, Reprieve. For services to Human Rights.

Honorary

==== Member of the Order of the British Empire (MBE) ====
Military

- Lieutenant Commander Karen Elizabeth Snel Barnicoat
- Lieutenant Commander Simon Hawthorn
- Lieutenant Commander Bryan McCavour
- Lieutenant Oliver James Mulcahy
- Major Erik Michael Nielsen
- Warrant Officer 1 Kieran Roe
- Lieutenant Commander Karen Shortland
- Acting Chief Petty Officer Logistician (Supply Chain) Matthew Tallentyre
- Acting Lieutenant Colonel Scott Peter Wallace
- Major Steven Ward
- Lieutenant Andrew Witts
- Lieutenant Colonel Piers Lyndon Ashfield, DSO. Grenadier Guards
- Major Matthew Stanley Bagshaw. Corps of Royal Electrical and Mechanical Engineers
- Lieutenant Colonel Duncan Bailey. Adjutant General's Corps (Staff and Personnel Support Branch)
- Sergeant Keith Joseph Baker. Corps of Royal Electrical and Mechanical Engineers
- Staff Sergeant Jamie Barrett. Royal Lancers (Queen Elizabeth's Own)
- Warrant Officer Class 1 Angus William Bartaby. Army Air Corps
- Major Andrew Martin Buckley. Royal Army Medical Corps
- Captain (Acting Major) Paul David Colville. Royal Regiment of Scotland
- Lieutenant Colonel Robert Harding Davison. Duke of Lancaster's Regiment
- Captain (Local Major) Jayne Louise Donaghue. Adjutant General's Corps (Staff and Personnel Support Branch)
- Lieutenant Colonel Richard James Hamilton Green. Grenadier Guards
- Major Gerald Martin Hedger, TD, VR. Royal Regiment of Artillery, Army Reserve
- Warrant Officer Class 2 Richard Kit Helmn. Yorkshire Regiment, Army Reserve
- Major Luke George Hoare. Army Air Corps
- Chaplain to the Forces (3rd Class) Reverend Alan Paul Jeans. Royal Army Chaplains' Department, Army Cadet Force
- Major Gavin Charles Kimberlin, MC. Mercian Regiment
- Sergeant James William Lambie. Parachute Regiment
- Major James Daniel Lowen. Corps of Royal Electrical and Mechanical Engineers
- Warrant Officer Class 2 Sheridan Lucas. Royal Logistic Corps
- Major Norman Macleod. Army Cadet Force
- Major Kenneth Allan Pickering. Army Cadet Force
- Warrant Officer Class 2 James Joseph Powell. Parachute Regiment
- Captain Joseph Edmund Geoffrey Read. Adjutant General's Corps (Educational and Training Services Branch)
- Captain Michael David Ridley. Royal Corps of Signals
- Captain Vivekjung Shah. Queen's Own Gurkha Logistic Regiment
- Staff Sergeant Simon Patrick Spriggs. Intelligence Corps
- Lieutenant Colonel Alasdair Fortune Lyon Steele, VR. Royal Regiment of Scotland, Army Reserve
- Major Toshiaki Alexander Suzuki. Parachute Regiment
- Major Christopher David Taylor. Royal Army Medical Corps
- Lieutenant Colonel Patricia Lynne Walters. Royal Army Medical Corps
- Major Damian Arthur Charles Warren. Corps of Royal Engineers
- Warrant Officer Class 1 Daniel Lewis Winfield. Royal Logistic Corps
- Major Nicholas Edward John Zorab. Royal Welsh
- Warrant Officer Sarah Louise Cotman
- Flight Sergeant (now Acting Warrant Officer) Andrea Joy Demarney
- Squadron Leader Gareth Elliott
- Squadron Leader Katherine Elizabeth Ingram
- Flight Lieutenant James Alan Kuht
- Warrant Officer Mary-Ellen Nash
- Squadron Leader Nana Akuffo Oteng-Gyan
- Acting Wing Commander Andrew Christopher Pass
- Flight Lieutenant Andrew David Preece
- Flight Lieutenant Kyle Yohann Xavier Roachford
- Squadron Leader Justin James Salmon
- Warrant Officer (now Flight Lieutenant) Gareth Morgan Williams

Civil

- Nicholas Ivan Abbott. Chair, Salford Foundation. For services to Young People and Social Inclusion in Salford, Greater Manchester.
- Victoria Abbott-Fleming. Founder, Burning Nights Complex Regional Pain Syndrome Support. For services to Charity.
- Sarah Adams. For services to the Armed Forces and their Families.
- Nahim Ahmed. For services to Young People from Disadvantaged Backgrounds in the London Borough of Tower Hamlets.
- Arif Mohiuddin Ahmed. Reader, Cambridge University. For services to Education.
- Nicholas Ainley. Lately Chair, EnhanceAble. For services to Disabled People in Kingston Upon Thames.
- Sally Alexander. Headteacher and Proprietor, Kimichi School, Birmingham. For services to Education.
- Dr. John Alexander. Consultant Paediatric Intensive Care, University Hospitals of North Midlands NHS Trust. For services to Critically Ill Children and Young People.
- Dr. Martin Brent Allen. Consultant Respiratory Physician, University Hospitals of North Midlands NHS Trust. For services to the NHS particularly during Covid-19.
- Afaf Abdrabou Aly. Chair, Egyptian Society of Northern Ireland. For services to UK-Egypt Relations and Anti-racism in Northern Ireland.
- Karen Margaret Anderson. For services to People with Disabilities.
- Paul Ian Charles Anderson. For services to the Scottish Fiddle Tradition and to Charity.
- Timothy John Andrews. Co-founder, LoveBrum. For services to Charity and the community in Birmingham.
- Helen Anne Anthony. Volunteer, Soul Kitchen, Chester. For services to Homeless People.
- Stephen Atherton. Lately Field Worker, Justice and Peace Commission. For services to the community in Liverpool.
- Kate Austin. Team Leader, Ministry of Defence. For services to Defence.
- Elisabeth Sophie Catherine Bonnardel-Azzarelli. Founder, AB5 Consulting. For services to the Nuclear Sector and to Diversity in the Engineering Profession.
- Stephen Anthony Ball. For services to Rugby League Charities.
- Geneviève Alison-Jane Ballard (Alison Moyet). Singer-Songwriter. For services to Music.
- Clegg Richard Bamber. Co-founder, Red Box Project, Portsmouth. For services to Education.
- Devina Banerjee. Vaccine Landscape and Portfolio, Vaccine Taskforce, Department for Business, Energy and Industrial Strategy. For services to Covid-19 Vaccine Development.
- Michelle Barnett. Founding Director, Give It Forward Today. For services to Vulnerable People during Covid-19.
- Lester Cornelis Barr. Founder and Chairman, Prevent Breast Cancer. For services to Cancer Prevention.
- Morna Helen Barron. National Secretary, Scottish Community Drama Association. For services to Community Drama.
- Elizabeth Batten. Disability Living Allowance Project Co-ordinator, Amaze. For services to Young People with Disabilities and Vulnerable Families.
- John Baxter. For voluntary services to the NHS.
- Richard Hugh Beazley, DL. For services to the community in Hertfordshire.
- Peter Griffith Beirne. Senior Investigating Officer, Police Staff, Thames Valley Police. For services to Policing.
- Debbie Anne Bellisio. Operational Manager, Border Force, Home Office. For services to Border Security.
- Nadine Rohanda Smith Wray Willow Benjamin. British Lyric Soprano and Creative Empowerment Mentor. For services to Opera.
- Patricia Bernal. Co-founder and Trustee, Protection Against Stalking. For services to the Prevention of Stalking.
- Michael Best. Lately Prison Officer, Entry Level Training Mentor, HM Prison Wayland. For services to HM Prison and Probation Service.
- Jacqueline Wendy Bird. Lately Regional Chief Nurse, North West Region, NHS England and NHS Improvement. For services to Nursing and the Covid-19 Response.
- Jay Blades. Furniture Restorer, Designer and Presenter. For services to Craft.
- Michael Raymond Blond. For services to the Jewish Community.
- Martin Blondel. For services to the community in St Helens, Merseyside particularly during Covid-19.
- Allan Godfrey Blundell. For services to School Governance and the Voluntary Sector in Essex.
- Corrine Boden. For services to the community in Stoke-on-Trent, Staffordshire particularly during Covid-19.
- Barry Michael Bond. Chair of Governors, Green Park School, Wolverhampton. For services to Education.
- Dennis Bovell. Musician. For services to Music.
- Alexander Lindsay Fraser Bowman. Chair, Angus and Dundee Area Committee, St John Scotland. For voluntary service to St John in Scotland.
- Paul Boyle (Billy Boyle), FREng. Chief Executive Officer, Owlstone Medical. For services to Engineering.
- James Richard Brand. Principal Teacher of Curriculum, Annan Academy, Dumfries and Galloway, Scotland. For services to Music and Education.
- Henrietta Katherine Braund. Chief Executive, Anthony Nolan. For services to Stem Cell Transplantation.
- Vivianne Frances Brealey. Deputy Director of Communications, Public Health England. For services to Public Health particularly during Covid-19.
- Dr. Teresa Mary Bridgeman. For services to Flood Preparations.
- Julia Catherine Bridgewater. Group Chief Operating Officer, Manchester University NHS Foundation Trust. For services to the NHS particularly during Covid-19.
- Leonard John Broadhurst. For services to the Food Supply Chain during Covid-19.
- Graham John Brogden. For services to Flood Prevention and Resilience.
- David Alexander Brookes. Civilian Security Officer, Northern Ireland Security and Guarding Service. For services to Defence and to Charity.
- Maureen Brosch. Teacher, Robin Hood Primary School, Nottingham. For services to the Inclusion and Education of Children.
- Elizabeth Hamilton Brown. Veterans Support Officer, Northern Ireland. For services to Veterans.
- Daryl Brown. Chief Executive, Magpas Air Ambulance. For services to Magpas and the Air Ambulance Sector.
- Matthew Rigby Brown. Lead Technical Architect, NHS Digital. For services to the Covid-19 Response.
- Hazel Elizabeth Brown. Head of Carers Services, Local Solutions. For services to Carers.
- Kelly Browne. Team Leader, Ministry of Defence. For services to Defence.
- Carolyn Rose Bunting. Chief Executive Officer, Internet Matters. For services to Online Safety and Families, particularly during Covid-19.
- John George Burrell. For services to the community in Fivemiletown.
- Elizabeth Anne Butterfield. Deputy Governor, Church Lads and Church Girls Brigade. For services to Young People.
- Dr. Ian Lyon Buxton. For services to the Preservation of British Maritime History and the community in Tynemouth, Tyne and Wear.
- Jennifer Ann Campbell. For services to Education, Young People and the community in Coleraine, Northern Ireland.
- Captain Georgina Elizabeth Carlo-Paat. Ilfracombe Harbour Master. For services to Promoting the Role of Women at Sea.
- Dr Nigel John Carr, DL. For services to Sport and Community Relations.
- Elizabeth Carr. Founder, Planet Patrol. For services to Environmental Activism and to Charity.
- Sarah Anne Caul. Mortality Analysis Team Manager, Office for National Statistics. For services to Health Statistics.
- Claire Diana Chadwick. Nurse Consultant in Infection Prevention and Control, Bradford Teaching Hospitals NHS Foundation Trust. For services to the NHS during Covid-19.
- Sophie Tendai Chandauka. Corporate Finance Lawyer, Entrepreneur and Co-founder, The Black British Business Awards. For services to Diversity in Business.
- Professor Anoop Jivan Chauhan. Professor of Respiratory Medicine and Executive Director of Research, Portsmouth Hospitals University NHS Trust. For services to Respiratory Medicine.
- Richard Douglas Cheesley. Tipstaff of the High Court, HM Courts and Tribunals Service. For services to the High Court of England and Wales.
- Vimalkumar Choksi. Councillor, Ashton Waterloo, Tameside. For services to the community in Greater Manchester.
- Edward Jonathan Chudleigh. Manufacturer, PPE Face Shields. For services to Provision of PPE during Covid-19.
- David William Churcher. For services to Construction.
- Zoe Adelle Clark-Coates. Founder, The Mariposa Trust. For services to the Baby Loss community and the Improvement of Bereavement Care.
- Allan James Clayton. Opera Singer. For services to Opera.
- Regina Josephine Geraldine Clement. Programme Director, Civil Service HR, Cabinet Office. For public service.
- Professor Thomas Henry Clutton-Brock. Director, Medical Devices Testing and Evaluation Centre. For services to the NHS during Covid-19.
- Angela Cohen. Chairman, 45 Aid Society. For services to Holocaust Education and Awareness.
- Crispian Hilary Vincent Collins. Chair, Grants Committee, Trusthouse Charitable Foundation and Trustee, Safe Child Thailand. For charitable services in the UK and the International Voluntary Sector.
- Grace Louisiana Collins. Leadership Adviser, Local Government Association. For services to Local Government.
- Dr. Maurice Hugh Joseph Conlon. National Professional Standards Lead and Clinical Adviser to NHS England and NHS Improvement, and GP Partner, Ridgacre Medical Centres. For services to Health during Covid-19.
- Dr. Anne Lesley Connolly. General Practitioner, Bevan Healthcare. For services to Primary Care Women's Health in Bradford.
- Barbara Conroy. Deputy Director, Tax Administration Policy. For services to HM Revenue and Customs and the Tax System.
- Michael John Conyers. For services to Charity and the community in Brentwood, Essex.
- Melanie Irene Coombes. Chief Nurse, Chief Operating Officer, Deputy Chief Executive, Coventry and Warwickshire Partnership NHS Trust. For services to Nursing.
- Daniel Anthony Corr. For voluntary services in Northern Ireland.
- Caroline Jane Coster. For services to Education in Bedfordshire and to Charity in Africa.
- Stephen Coupe. For services to Charitable Fundraising and Voluntary Work.
- Anne Christine Cox. Campaigner, UK NHS Organ Donor Register. For services to Organ Donation.
- Stephen Raymond Craddock. Founder, Cycle4Heroes. For services to Charity and the community in Kent.
- Jo-Anne Louise Crowder. Office Manager, Speaker's Office, House of Commons. For services to Parliament.
- Linda Ann Crowe. Senior Project Manager for Health and Social Care Network, NHS Digital. For services to Health and Care particularly during Covid-19.
- Colonel (Retired) Patrick Timothy Crowley, DL. Deputy Colonel, The Princess of Wales's Royal Regiment, and Chief Executive Officer, South East Reserve Forces and Cadets Association. For voluntary service to the Armed Forces and to Military Heritage.
- Peter Anthony Cullimore. Founder, Universal Care. For services to the Provision of Social Care in Beaconsfield, Buckinghamshire.
- Susan Elizabeth Cummings. Guidance Improvement Lead, HM Revenue and Customs. For services to Improving Customer Service.
- Dr. Heather Currie. Gynaecologist and Associate Medical Director for Women, Children and Sexual Health, Acute and Diagnostic Services at NHS Dumfries and Galloway. For services to Healthcare.
- Leigh John Curtis. Director of Operations, Air Ambulance Kent Surrey Sussex. For services to the Air Ambulance Service particularly during Covid-19.
- Elizabeth Jane Curtis. Chief Executive, Lily Foundation. For services to People with Mitochondrial Disease.
- Raymond Thomas Dainton. Fundraiser, Special Schools in Bolton. For services to Children with Special Educational Needs.
- Michael John Dalby. Active, Get Set, Promises Day Nursery, Chesterfield. For services to Education.
- Lorraine Daniels. Health and Wellbeing Adviser, HM Treasury. For public service.
- Nicola Davies. Headteacher, Nant y Parc Primary School, Caerphilly, Wales. For services to Education.
- Mary Davies. 999 Adviser, BT Voice Services. For services to the Emergency Services.
- Margaret Christine Davis. For services to Community Relations in Northern Ireland.
- Professor Alexander Meikle Davison, RD. Trustee and Chairman, The Lady Haig Poppy Factory in Edinburgh. For voluntary service to the Royal British Legion in Scotland.
- Neil Anthony Dawson. For services to the community in Stoke-on-Trent, Staffordshire.
- Rebecca Alice Dean. Co-founder, The Girls' Network. For services to Female Empowerment and Young Girls.
- Georgina Alice Delaney. Founder, The Great Outdoor Gym Company. For services to International Trade.
- Dr. Thushan de Silva. Senior Clinical Lecturer and Honorary Consultant Physician in Infectious Diseases, University of Sheffield. For services to Covid-19 Research.
- Sharon Denise Devey. Wellbeing Champion, Child Maintenance Group, Department for Work and Pensions. For services to Wellbeing in the Workplace.
- Maureen Devine (Mary Elizabeth Devine). Chair, Northern Region, Irish Pilgrimage Trust. For services to Young People with Special Needs in Northern Ireland.
- Gurveer Dhami. Senior Private Secretary to the Secretary Of State For Education. For services to Education.
- Michelle Doherty. For services to Nursing and to Lung Cancer Patients.
- Valerie Joyce Donnelly. Senior Project Delivery Manager, HM Revenue and Customs. For services to Charity particularly during Covid-19.
- Arnold George Dorsey (Engelbert Humperdinck). For services to Music.
- Clive Anthony Douglas. Chair of the Board of Trustees, The Boleyn Trust. For services to Education.
- Stephanie Douglas. Head of Service Early Years, Doncaster Local Authority. For services to Education.
- David Julian Draffan. Service Director for Economic Development, Plymouth City Council. For services to Local Government.
- Susan Kay Dunbar. For services to Literature.
- James Walter Duncan. For services to the community in Bute during the Covid-19 Pandemic.
- Tracy-Jane Duncan-Moir. Business Consultant, Business Glu. For services to Female Entrepreneurship and Business Recovery from the Covid-19 Pandemic.
- Major (Retired) John Marshall Dunlop. For services to Cross Border Peace Building and the community in County Fermanagh.
- Aimee Durning. Teaching Assistant, University of Cambridge Primary School. For services to Education.
- Catherine Dutton. Chair, Kendal College Corporation. For services to Education and Training.
- Samantha Mary Ward Dyer. Director and Chief Executive Officer, Cambridge Sustainable Food CIC. For services to Tackling Food Inequality during Covid-19.
- David Frederick Morley Dykes. For services to Perth Academy, Scotland and to the community in Perth.
- Charlotte Catherine Eadie. Editor, Army and You Magazine, Army Families Federation. For services to Army Personnel and Families.
- Stephen Douglas Earl. Founder and Managing Director, Panel Graphic. For services to the NHS and Front-Line Workers during the Covid-19 Pandemic.
- Josh Eggleton. For services to the community in Bristol during Covid-19.
- Adam Garry Elcock. For services to Fundraising for Military Charities and to the community in Christchurch, Dorset.
- Frances Helen Elliott. Head of Practical Support Services, Harrogate Easier Living Project, and Chief Executive, Harrogate and District Community Action. For services to the community in Harrogate during Covid-19.
- Jonathan Elliott. Director, AstraZeneca. For services to Life Sciences and the Covid-19 Response.
- Annette England. Director, Biomax Scientific Consultancy Ltd. For services to the UK Bioprocessing Community and the Vaccine Taskforce.
- Oyiyole Augustine Entonu. Chair, Cabinet Office Race Equality Network. For services to Racial Diversity and Inclusion.
- Linda Ervine. For services to the community in East Belfast.
- Carlos Eduardo Espinal Chinchilla. For services to the British Technology Entrepreneurship Ecosystem.
- Melanie Veronique Eusebe. Entrepreneur and Author, and Founder, Black British Business Awards. For services to Diversity in Business.
- Isobel Marie-Ann Everett. Lately Chair, Wales Audit Office. For public service and for Future Leaders' Development.
- Dr. Abdul Raffey Faruqi. Lately Senior Research Scientist, MRC Laboratory of Molecular Biology. For services to Medical Research.
- David Andrew Vincent Faulkner. Head of Performance, Women's Professional Game and Para, Football Association. For services to Sport.
- Henry Faure Walker. Chair, News Media Association, and Chief Executive Officer, Newsquest. For services to Regional News and Journalism and to Charity.
- Asad Mahmood Fazil. Chief Executive Officer, Al-Hurraya, Nottingham. For services to Education.
- Martyn Featherstone. Lecturer, The Northern School of Art, Middlesbrough. For services to Further Education.
- Keith George Fernett. Lately Chief Executive, Caritas Anchor House. For services to Homeless People.
- Reverend Andrew Fordyce. For services to the community in Colchester, Essex.
- Dr. John Richard Forkin, DL. Managing Director, Marketing Derby. For services to International Trade and Investment.
- Elizabeth Charlotte Franklin-Jones. Children's Senior Sister, Children's Emergency Department, East and North Hertfordshire NHS Trust. For services to Nursing and Mental Health Services.
- Claudette Fraser. Employer Adviser, Hulme Jobcentre Plus, Work and Health Services Group, Department for Work and Pensions. For services to Unemployed People in South Manchester.
- Susan Rose Freestone. For services to the Food Supply Chain.
- Pamela Fry. Chief Executive Officer, PlayWise Learning CIC. For services to Children and Young People with Special Educational Needs and Disabilities.
- Sheila Furlong. Chief Executive, The Archway Foundation. For services to Mental Health.
- Simon Gadd. Founder and Director, Trinity Fencing CIC. For services to Social Mobility.
- Jacqueline Mary Gale. Chief Executive, Wax Lyrical Ltd. For services to the NHS during the Covid 19 Pandemic.
- Ursula Maire Gallagher. Lately Deputy Chief Inspector, Care Quality Commission. For services to Healthcare, Patient Safety and Healthcare Education.
- Amika Sara George. Founder, #FreePeriods Campaign. For services to Education.
- Professor Azra Catherine Hilary Ghani. Professor, Infectious Disease Epidemiology, Imperial College London. For services to Infectious Disease Control and Epidemiological Research.
- Karen Gibson. For services to Safety in Transport.
- Jess Gillam. Saxophonist and Presenter. For services to Music.
- Ceri Goddard. Director, Equality Impact Investing. For services to Social Justice.
- Severiano Gomez-Aspron. For services to the community of Newton-le-Willows, Merseyside during Covid-19.
- Lisa Marilyn Goodwin. Chief Executive, Connected Voice. For services to Vulnerable People during the Covid-19 Pandemic.
- Matthew John Gorman. Carbon Strategy Director, Heathrow Airport. For services to Decarbonisation of Aviation.
- David Goulding. Health Emergency Planning Adviser, Welsh Government. For services to Emergency Planning.
- Sumit Goyal. Consultant Oncoplastic Surgeon, Cardiff and Vale University Health Board. For services to Breast Cancer and Cardiff Breast Centre Charity.
- Julie Elizabeth Grainger. Group Leader, Wolverhampton Alz Café. For charitable and voluntary services to Sufferers of Dementia and their Families.
- Stephen Paul Greene. For services to BT and their Colleagues’ and Customers' Safety during Covid-19.
- Paul Anthony Grover (Paul Kallee-Grover). Chair, Liverpool China Partnership. For services to International Trade and Investment.
- Priya Guha. Venture Partner, Merian Ventures, and Member, Innovate UK Council. For services to International Trade and Women-Led Innovation.
- Dr. Abdul Hafeez. Founder and Chief Executive, Association of Pakistani Physicians and Surgeons of the United Kingdom. For services to the NHS particularly during Covid-19.
- Jayne Paula Haines. Chair, Women in Sport. For services to Women's Sport.
- Jemma Haines. Consultant Speech and Language Therapist, Manchester University NHS Foundation Trust. For services to Speech and Language Therapy particularly during Covid-19.
- Peter Hall. Team Leader, Ministry of Defence. For services to Defence.
- Stella Maria Hannaway. Head of Transformation, HM Prison Liverpool. For services to Prison Healthcare.
- Cheryl Claire Harbourne. Home Manager, Royal Star and Garter, Solihull. For services to Veterans during Covid-19.
- Dr David Harding. For Public and Political Service in Northern Ireland.
- Tina Jacqueline Harrison. For services to the community in Bury, Greater Manchester during Covid-19.
- Kay Dawn Harvey, BEM. For services to the community in Badersfield, Norwich.
- Alan John Hastings. Major Incident Room Manager, Operation STOVEWOOD, National Crime Agency. For services to Law Enforcement.
- Aida Haughton. Housing Support Administrator, YMCA North Staffordshire. For services to Remembering Srebrenica.
- Adele Jane Haysom. Chair of Trustees, Board Lighthouse Schools Partnership. For services to Education.
- Norma Alene Hazzledine. For services to Bowls.
- Catherine Ruth Heery. Member, Taskforce Europe. For services to EU Negotiations.
- Dr. Katherine Isabella Murray Henderson. President, Royal College of Emergency Medicine and Consultant in Emergency Medicine, St Thomas' Hospital. For services to Emergency Medicine during Covid-19.
- Jordan Brian Henderson. Captain, Liverpool Football Club. For services to Football and Charity, particularly during the Covid-19 Pandemic.
- Dr. Jeremy Henzell-Thomas. For services to the Civil Society and the Muslim community in the UK.
- Claire Patricia Higgins. Chief Executive, Cross Keys Homes. For services to Housing.
- Paul James Higgins. For services to the Arts, Film and TV Industry in Wales.
- Kerrie Louise Higham. For services to the community in Morecambe, Lancashire particularly during Covid-19.
- Dr. Jerry Hill. Chief Medical Adviser, British Horseracing Association. For services to British Horseracing during the Covid-19 Pandemic.
- Giles David Hilton. Chairman and Commercial Manager, Canterbury Rugby Football Club. For services to Rugby Union Football in Kent.
- Sarah Louise Hodgson. Head, Workforce Development Enablers, College of Policing. For services to Policing and Recruitment through the Covid-19 Pandemic.
- Janette Barr Anderson Hogan. Cancer and Palliative Care Clinical Lead, Manchester University NHS Foundation Trust. For services to Palliative Care in Manchester.
- John Hogg. Head, South Central Operations, Natural Resources Wales. For services to Environmental Management.
- Elaine Joy Hopkins. County Committee Member and Volunteer, Royal British Legion, Nottingham. For voluntary services to the ex-Service community in Nottinghamshire.
- Michael John Hopkins. Principal, South and City College, Birmingham. For services to Education.
- Philip Hoppenbrouwers. Proprietor, ALP schools. For services to Children with Special Educational Needs and Disabilities in Kent and Leicester.
- Eric Horabin. Member and Poppy Appeal Collector, Tamworth Branch, Royal British Legion. For voluntary service to the ex-Service community.
- Squadron Leader Kenneth Horn. Operational Meteorologist, Met Office. For services to Operational Meteorology.
- Gareth Alwyn Horner. Lifeboat Operations Manager, Newquay Lifeboat Station. For services to the Royal National Lifeboat Institution.
- Philippa Jane Hughes. Founder, Carriage Driving and Founding Member, Wyfold Riding for the Disabled. For services to People with Disabilities.
- Alison Dorothy Hughes. For services to Tennis.
- Beverley Anne Humphreys (Beverley Humphreys), DL. Broadcaster, BBC Radio Wales. For services to Community Cohesion and Broadcasting.
- Karl Humphries. Instructor, Get Hooked on Fishing. For services to Education.
- William Christopher Radcliffe Husband. Vocational Qualifications Officer, Devon Army Cadet Force. For services to Young People.
- Zillur Hussain. Owner, Tavan Restaurant. For services to the community in Peterborough during the Covid-19 Pandemic.
- Dilwar Hussain. For services to Interfaith and Social Cohesion.
- Rachel Huxford. Director, Marketing and Fundraising, RAF Association. For services to the RAF Community during Covid-19.
- Wayne Edward Ingram. For Charitable Service.
- Irenosen Iseghohi Okojie. Writer. For services to Literature.
- Stephen Albert Andrew Jaggs. Ceremonial Works Manager and Associate Serjeant at Arms, Houses of Parliament. For Parliamentary and voluntary service.
- Edward Charles Harrison James. Deputy Director Head of Procurement, Department of Health and Social Care. For services to Healthcare particularly during Covid-19.
- Kiran Kumari Jassal. Senior Operational Manager, HM Prison Winchester. For services to the HM Prison and Probation Service during Covid-19 and to Diversity and Inclusion.
- Edith Jayne. For services to Holocaust Education and Awareness.
- David Jeffrey. Manager, Ballymena Utd. For services to Association Football and Community Relations in Northern Ireland.
- Gareth Mansel Jenkins. For services to Manufacturing and Apprenticeships.
- Dr. Joanna Jenkinson. Head of Infections and Immunity, Medical Research Council. For services to Covid-19 Research Funding.
- Dr. Fergus Keith Jepson. Consultant, Specialist Mobility Rehabilitation Centre, Lancashire Teaching Hospitals National Health Trust. For services to Injured Veterans.
- Olga Johnson. Founder and Co-Chair, Nourish Community Foodbank in Tunbridge Wells, Kent, For services to Charity.
- Jane Ruth Johnson. Chief Executive, disAbility Cornwall and Isles of Scilly. For services to People with Disabilities during Covid-19.
- Tracey Marie Johnson. HR Director, Leek United Building Society. For services to Financial Services during Covid-19.
- Jaimie George Johnston. Architecture Board Director, Bryden Wood. For services to Construction.
- Henry Llewellyn Michael Jones. For services to the community in Aldgate, London during the Covid-19 Pandemic.
- Mark Andrew Jones. Ethical Hacking Services Team, Driver and Vehicle Licensing Agency. For services to Science, Technology and Maths.
- Michael Jones. For services to the Royal British Legion and the community in Gwent.
- Professor Ray Brian Jones. Professor of Health Informatics, University of Plymouth. For services to Digital Health and Social Care.
- Ryan Paul Jones. For services to Rugby Union Football and Charitable Fundraising in Wales.
- Dr. Miles Victor Joyner. Founder, Exeter Leukaemia Fund. For services to People Suffering from Blood Cancer in Devon.
- Elizabeth Avril Karter. Therapist in Gambling Addiction. For services to Gambling Addiction in Women.
- John Edward Keeler. Chair of Governors, Headcorn Primary School and Governor, Park Way Primary School, Kent. For services to Education.
- Michael Joseph Kelly. Executive Headteacher, Redriff Primary School, Rotherhithe, London. For services to Education and to the community in Southwark.
- Kieran Kennedy. Managing Director, O'Neills Irish international Sports Company Ltd. For services to Business and to the Economy during the Covid-19 Pandemic.
- Allyson Jane Keresey. Head of Senior Caseworker Team and Mental Health First Aider, UK Visas and Immigration, Home Office. For services to Refugees, Mental Health and the community in Croydon.
- Nahim Khan. Team Member, Leadership and Shared Capability, Digital Group. For services to Black, Asian and Minority Ethnic Staff in the Department for Work and Pensions.
- Fahima Khanom. Halifax Check Challenge Appeal, Hub Manager, Valuation Office Agency. For services to Customers during Covid-19.
- Gavin Stuart Kibble. For services to the community in Coventry, particularly during Covid-19.
- Ian Michael Kirby. For services to BT Global and Business Continuity during Covid-19.
- David Brian Knott. Compliance Manager, Belfast Harbour. For services to the Port Industry and the community in Belfast.
- Jeanette Boahemaa Kwakye. For services to Sport and Sports Broadcasting.
- Davinder John Lail. Head of Ozone Depleting Substances and Fluorinated Greenhouse Gases Team, Department for Environment, Food and Rural Affairs. For services to the Environment.
- Amanda Jane Lambert. Data Manager, Watchlist and Information Control Unit, Border Force, Home Office. For services to Border Security particularly during Covid-19.
- Patrice Lawrence. Author. For services to Literature.
- Deirdre Mary Leach. Co-founder, Making Connections, HM Prison Send. For services to Prisoners.
- Phyllis Agnes Leckey. For services to Nursing and Healthcare in Northern Ireland.
- Richard Lederle. Immigration Enforcement Manager, Home Office. For services to the Immigration System and Protecting Vulnerable People.
- Rachel May Ledwith. London Manager, FareShare. For services to charitable Food Provision during Covid-19.
- Stanley James Lee. For services to People with Learning Difficulties in Northern Ireland.
- Dr. Peter Derick Lees. Chief Executive, Faculty of Medical Leadership and Management. For services to Medical Leadership.
- Denise Mary Leeson. Operational Manager, Mental Health, HM Courts and Tribunals Service. For services to the Administration of Justice during Covid-19.
- Mark Lindsay. Chairman, Police Federation, Northern Ireland. For services to Policing and the community in Northern Ireland.
- Colin Brian Liptrot. Mechanical Electrical Instrumentation Control and Automation, Environment Agency. For services to Diversity and Inclusion.
- Dr. John Gareth Llewelyn. Consultant Physician Neurology and Hon. Senior Lecturer Aneurin Bevan University Health Board Organisation. For services to Medicine in Wales.
- Professor Timothy James Lockley. For services to the community in Harbury, Warwickshire particularly during Covid-19.
- Rachael Loftus. Leeds Covid Shielding Programme Lead, West Yorkshire Health and Care Partnership Head of Regional Health Partnerships. For services to the Shielding Programme in Leeds.
- Maria Freda Lovell. For services to the African community in Bedfordshire during Covid-19.
- Professor Margaret Johnston Low. Professor, University of Warwick. For services to Public Engagement and Widening Participation.
- Sharron Kim Lusher, DL. For services to Further Education in Pembrokeshire, Wales.
- Dr. Christine Isabel Lusk. Head of Special Projects, University of St Andrews, Scotland. For services to Accessibility and Young People.
- Patricia Lyons. Lately Chair, Hampshire Branch, Soldiers, Sailors, Airman and Families Association. For voluntary service to Veterans.
- Michael Francis Lyons. For services to the community in Bexley and Barnehurst, South East London.
- Jane Susan MacLaren. For Political Service.
- Charles Peter Bruce Maclean. For services to Scotch Whisky, to UK Exports and to Charity.
- Neena Mahal, DL. Chair, NHS Lanarkshire. For services to Healthcare.
- Shivarubeni Mahathevan. Curriculum Manager and Tutor, Redbridge Institute of Adult Education. For services to Education.
- Sofia Mahmood. Director, Empowering Minds, Bradford. For services to Education.
- Lynne Michelle Main. Head of Safety and Health and Wellbeing at Work, Department for Environment, Food and Rural Affairs. For services to Safety, Health and Wellbeing.
- Claire Malcolm. Founder, New Writing North. For services to Literature, Young People, and the North-East of England.
- Leon William Douglas Mann. Founder, Black Collective of Media in Sport. For services to Diversity in Sport.
- Dr. Joseph Charles Manning. Clinical Associate Professor in Children and Young People Nursing, Nottingham Children's Hospital, Nottingham University Hospitals NHS Trust. For services to Nursing.
- Amanda Bethan Mansfield. Consultant Midwife, London Ambulance Service NHS Trust. For services to Midwifery.
- Ngonidzaishe Adam Mapani. Lead Nurse Consultant, Moorfields Eye Hospital NHS Foundation Trust and Clinical Teaching Fellow, University College London, Department of Clinical Ophthalmology. For services to Ophthalmology.
- Nicola Mary Markham. For services to communities in the South West of England particularly during Covid-19.
- Melanie Marshall. For services to Swimming and Charity.
- Reverend Lesley Jane Mason. Managing Chaplain and Making Connections Co-founder, HM Prison Send. For services to Prisoners.
- Mark Forrest Mathieson. Lead Partner, Technical Services, McLaren Racing. For services to the Ventilator Challenge.
- Kevin Maxwell. Author, Forced Out. For services to Diversity through Literature.
- Simon Andrew Hicks Mayo. Radio Presenter. For services to Broadcasting.
- Alexander Eric McArthur. For services to Beekeeping.
- Jill McClintock. For services to Physiotherapy particularly during Covid-19.
- Marian McCouaig. Principal, Kylemore Nursery School, Coleraine, Ulster. For services to Education.
- Jennifer Suzanne McDonnell. Knowledge Transfer Manager, Knowledge Transfer Network. For services to the Green Economy.
- Eileen McEneaney. For services to Nursing and Midwifery.
- Linda McGrath. Headteacher, Woodthorpe Junior and Infant School, Birmingham. For services to Education.
- Eleanor Muir McKay. Librarian, Live Argyll. For services to Local Studies and the community in Argyll and Bute.
- Arthur Ellis McKeown. For services to Refugees and Asylum Seekers.
- Ivan Ernest McMinn. For services to Charity and the community in Northern Ireland.
- Jean McVann (Jean Makin). For services to the community in Rotherham.
- Amanda Kate Medler. Chief Guide, Girlguiding. For services to Girls and Young Women.
- Christine Paula Megson. Co-Founder, Fabian Women's Network Mentoring Programme. For services to Gender Equality.
- Simon Middleton. Coach, England Women's Rugby Union Team. For services to Rugby Football.
- Steven Mifsud. Director, Direct Access Consultancy Limited. For services to International Trade and Investment.
- Anna Isabelle Miles. Co-founder, Red Box Project, Portsmouth. For services to Education.
- Gordon Mills. Chair, Aberdeen and District Transport Preservation Trust. For services to the Grampian Transport Museum.
- Robert James Mitchell. Principal Social Worker (Adults), Bradford Council. For services to the Social Work Profession.
- Scott Mitchell. Team Leader, Ministry of Defence. For services to Defence.
- Robert Henry Mole. For services to the community in Hexham, Northumberland.
- Rhonda Edith Margaret Moles. Principal, Cumran Primary School, Clough, Northern Ireland. For services to Education.
- Maeve Monaghan. Chief Executive, the NOW Group. For services to People with Learning Difficulties.
- Angela Joan Mooney. For services to Social Care in Hammersmith and Fulham.
- Herbert Wavell Torrens Moore. For Public Service in the UK and Abroad.
- Karen Moore. Head of Quality Enhancement, North West Regional College, Northern Ireland. For services Education.
- Frances Moore. Chief Executive, IFPI. For services to the International Recorded Music Industry.
- Samantha Pippa Moore. For services to Dance.
- Phillip John Morris. Founder, checkemlads.com. For services to Raising Awareness of Testicular Cancer.
- Josepha Hannah Morris (Josie Morris). Managing Director, Woolcool. For services to Manufacturing and the Environment.
- Dr. Murthy Lakshmi Narayana Motupalli. General Practitioner, NHS East Lancashire Clinical Commissioning Group. For services to Education, Training and Support for Black, Asian and Minority Ethnic Doctors and to General Practice.
- Christina Elizabeth Mountain (Tina Mountain). Councillor, Surrey County Council and President, Epsom and Ewell Conservative Association. For Public and Political Service.
- Sarah Jane Mukherjee. For services to British Agriculture and Farmer Wellbeing.
- Kirsty Anne Murphy. Aviation Ambassador. For services to Aviation.
- Beverley Murray. For services to the community in Chorley, Lancashire.
- Iain David Nairn. For services to Physical Disabilities Cricket.
- Meera Naran. Campaigner, Road Safety on Smart Motorways. For services to Road Safety.
- Ruth Allison Neill. Legacy Team Officer, Northern Ireland Office. For services to Legacy in Northern Ireland.
- Andrew Christopher Nelson. Project Manager, Defence Equipment and Support. For services to Defence.
- Rowhi Mahmoud Nemer. Owner, CamCab. For services to Frontline NHS Workers and the community during the Covid-19 Pandemic.
- Elma Elizabeth Alexandra Newberry. Assistant Director, Land and Regeneration. For services to Housing in Northern Ireland and contribution to Reconciliation.
- Jane Mary Nickerson. Chief Executive Officer, Swim England. For services to Swimming during the Covid-19 Pandemic.
- Michael Stuart Noad. Principal Technical Adviser, Atomic Weapons Establishment. For services to Defence.
- Ian Andrew Noons. Custodial Manager, HM Young Offender Institution, Drake Hall. For services to HM Prison and Probation Service.
- Marie-Lyse Numuhoza. For services to Human Rights and the community in Thetford, Norfolk.
- Katherine Anne O'Connor. Senior Policy Manager, Cities and Local Growth Unit, North West, Department for Business, Energy and Industrial Strategy. For services to Business and the community in North West England.
- Anthony O'Reilly. Chair, Northern Ireland Human Rights Consortium. For services to People with Disabilities in Northern Ireland.
- Rebecca Oaks. For services to Coppicing and Green Wood Crafts.
- Emmanuel Offiah. For services to Law Enforcement.
- Tove Okunniwa. Chief Executive, London Sport. For services to Sport.
- Evelyn Ann Oliphant. Head of Strategic Business Unit, Education Scotland. For services to Education and Charity.
- Alan Leslie Olver. Voluntary Chief Executive Officer, Maninplace. For services to Homeless People.
- Dr. Carolyn Elizabeth Otley. For services to the community in Cumbria during Covid-19.
- John Wilson Oxley. For services to Heritage.
- Zahir Patel. Case Progression Officer, Operational Delivery, Crown Prosecution Service. For services to Law and Order.
- Ashraf Rahimsha Patel. Associate Specialist, Breast Surgery, The Princess Alexandra Hospital NHS Trust. For services to Funding and Research for Breast Cancer.
- Emma Pearne. Deputy Head Covid-19 Bus Service Support Grant Funding, Department for Transport. For services to Transport and the Covid-19 Response.
- Alan Pearson. Headteacher, New Invention Junior School, Walsall, West Midlands. For services to Education.
- Jonathan Rankin Peel. Director of Strategy and Business Operations, Trinity Laban Conservatoire of Music and Dance. For services to Higher Education.
- Catherine Ann Pelley. Chief Nurse and Director of Clinical Governance, Homerton University Hospital NHS Foundation Trust. For services to Nursing Leadership in the NHS.
- Alison Celia Frances Penny. Coordinator, National Bereavement Alliance and Director, Childhood Bereavement Network. For services to Bereavement Support.
- Daryl Margaret Perkins. District Manager, Humber and East Riding St John Ambulance. For voluntary service to St John Ambulance and to Young People.
- Glen Perkins. Founder and Volunteer, Action 4 Ashes and Shrewsbury Street Pastors. For services to the community in Shropshire.
- Alison Margaret Pessell. For services to the English Fishing Industry.
- Graham Peter Phillips, DL. County Commissioner, Cheshire Scouts and Chief Executive Officer, Cheshire Young Carers. For services to Young People in Cheshire during Covid-19.
- William Martyn Phillips. Lately Chief Executive, Welsh Rugby Union. For services to Rugby in Wales.
- Bertram Dorian James Phillips. For services to Sport and the community in Carmarthenshire and Pembrokeshire.
- Cara Phillips. Member, Taskforce Europe. For services to EU Negotiations.
- Victoria Ann Phipps. Co-founder, D-Day Revisited. For services to Veterans and the Commemoration of the Second World War.
- Annette Picton. Lately Trustee, The Royal Navy and Royal Marines Charity. For services to Naval Personnel and Veterans.
- Kelly Pierce-Nergaard. Lately Midwifery Matron for Public Health and Education, Western Sussex Hospitals NHS Foundation Trust. For services to the NHS particularly during Covid-19.
- Angela Mary Porter (Angela Newton). For voluntary services in Lincolnshire.
- Andrew Robert Pratt. For services to the community in Lancashire during Covid-19.
- Geoffrey Bernard Preston. For services to Stucco and Plastering.
- Emrys Wyn Pritchard. Director of Health and Safety and Sustainability, University of Northumbria. For services to Higher Education.
- Rajinder Pryor. Engagement Lead, Network Rail. For services to Diversity and Inclusion within the Rail Industry.
- Karin Qureshi. Mental Health Lead, Birmingham City University. For services to Mental Health and Higher Education.
- Ellen Rafferty. For services to Education.
- Dr. Ananthakrishnan Raghuram. Consultant Physician, Gloucestershire Hospitals NHS Foundation Trust. For services to the NHS and the Covid-19 Response.
- Ebony-Jewel Cora-Lee Camellia Rosamond Rainford-Brent. For services to Cricket and Charity.
- Dianne Elizabeth Rees, JP. Councillor, Cardiff Council. For Political and public service.
- Suzanne Nicola Reeves. Co-chair, Disability Group, Office for National Statistics and Chair, Civil Service Disability Network. For services to Disability, to Diversity, and Inclusion.
- Trudy Norma Reid. For services to Infection Prevention and Control during the Covid-19 Crisis.
- Angela Eileen Reid. For services to Care Home Residents particularly during Covid-19.
- Siobhan Reilly (Siobhan Heafield). Regional Chief Nurse, Midlands and East, NHS England and NHS Improvement. For services to Nursing and the Covid-19 Response.
- Helen Kathryn Richardson. Founder and Chief Executive Officer, Workpays Ltd. For services to Young People, especially during the Covid-19 Pandemic.
- Stuart Rimmer. Principal, East Coast College. For services to Education and the community in Great Yarmouth, Norfolk during the Covid-19 Pandemic.
- Robert Michael Rinder. For services to Holocaust Education and Awareness.
- Christopher John Robinson. For services to Heritage, Conservation, Education, Business and Tourism in Plymouth.
- Bernadette Rochford. Freedom To Speak Up Guardian, Mersey Care NHS Foundation Trust. For services to the NHS.
- Dr. Michael Rogers. Assistant Director, Global Health Research, NIHR Central Commissioning Facility. For services to Covid-19 Research Funding.
- Rebecca Rollason. Resourcing Manager, Vaccines Taskforce, Department for Business, Energy and Industrial Strategy. For services to Government during the Covid-19 Response.
- Teresa Ross. For services to Physiotherapy particularly during Covid-19.
- Sarah Louise Rowbotham. For services to Young People.
- Professor Anthony Walter Rowbottom. Professor and Clinical Director for Pathology, Lancashire and South Cumbria Pathology Network, Lancashire Teaching Hospitals. For services to Pathology during the Covid-19 Pandemic.
- Francis Arthur Runacres. Executive Director, Enterprise and Innovation, Arts Council England. For services to the Arts.
- Josephine Sanderson. Finance and Business Support Manager, Forestry England. For services to Forestry.
- Scott Antony Saunders. Founder and Chairman, March of the Living UK. For services to Holocaust Education.
- Emily Scarratt. Vice Captain, England Women's Rugby Team. For services to Rugby Union.
- Gillian Scott. Lately Macmillan Prison Lead for Palliative and End of Life Care, County Durham and Darlington NHS Foundation Trust. For services to Palliative and End of Life Care.
- Professor Marie Ann Scully. Consultant Haematologist, University College London Hospitals NHS Foundation Trust. For services to Blood Disorders.
- Catherine Anne Scutt. Director of Education and Research, Chartered College of Teaching. For services to Education.
- Paul Crispin Seager. Tactical Communications Projects Manager, Defence Equipment and Support. For services to Defence.
- Anita Seaton. For services to the Environment and Vulnerable Communities.
- Dr. Laura Jane Frances Shallcross. Associate Professor of Public Health, University College London. For services to Adult Social Care during the Covid-19 Pandemic.
- Norma Leah Shearer. Chief Executive, Training for Women Network. For services to Women in Northern Ireland.
- Gillian Marie Jeanne Shepherd-Coates. Chief Executive Officer, Age UK Sevenoaks and Tonbridge. For services to charity and Reducing Social Isolation and Loneliness for Older People.
- Andrew James Sherman, JP. Employer and Partnership Manager, Work and Health Services Group, Department for Work and Pensions. For services to Employment and the community in Southampton.
- Professor Bridget Mary Shield (Bridget Mary West). Acoustic Engineer. For services to Acoustic Science and to Inclusion in Science and Engineering.
- John Thomas Shiels. Chief Executive Officer, Manchester United Foundation. For services to Young People through Football.
- Geoffrey Michael Simmonds. Trustee, Pavilion Opera Educational Trust. For services to Education.
- Jonathan Andrew Simpson. Councillor, London Borough of Camden. For services to Local Government in Camden, to Charity and to Culture in London.
- Kermal Singh. Police Staff, Avon and Somerset Constabulary. For services to Policing and Diversity.
- Peter Smith. For services to Wildlife and Conservation in Bedfordshire.
- Jaime Bree Smith. Director, Mental Health and Wellbeing in Schools Programme, Anna Freud Centre, London. For services to Education.
- Linda-Claire Smith. Lately Head of Public Protection Team, Crime, Policing and Fire Group, Home Office. For services to Public Protection and Safeguarding of Children and Vulnerable Adults.
- Reshma Sohoni. Co-founder, Seedcamp. For services to the British Technology Entrepreneurship Ecosystem.
- Michèle Souris. Senior Personal Assistant to the Lord Chief Justice, Royal Courts of Justice. For services to the Administration of Justice.
- Eleanor May Southwood. Councillor, London Borough of Brent. For services to charity and Local Government.
- Shirley Ann Southworth. For services to the community in Wigan, Greater Manchester during Covid-19.
- Dr. Lisa Graham Spencer. Consultant Respiratory Physician, Liverpool University Hospitals NHS Foundation Trust. For services to the NHS during Covid-19.
- Raheem Sterling. For services to Racial Equality in Sport.
- Helen Storey. Founder, Triple A. For services to the community in Cumbria.
- Clifford John Thornton Stott. Professor of Social Psychology, Keele University. For services to Crowd Psychology and the Covid-19 Pandemic Response.
- George Henry Streatfeild. For services to the Food Industry and the community in Bridport, Dorset.
- John Stuart. For services to the community in Ballymena, County Antrim.
- John Denis Stuart. For services to NHS Greater Glasgow and Clyde.
- Margaret Rose Stubbs. Member of Patient Forum, Health Education England. For services to Diversity and Inclusion in the NHS.
- Michael Taggart. Domestic Abuse Strategic Officer, North Wales Police. For services to Victims of Domestic Abuse.
- Linda Elizabeth Tapner. Chief Executive Officer, Selnet. For services to Social Enterprise.
- Julie Taylor. Uniformed Services Teacher, Ashfield School, East Midlands. For services to Education and Charity.
- Michael John Taylor. Co-founder, The Bridge For Heroes. For services to Supporting Ex-Service Personnel and their Families.
- Helen Taylor. Co-founder, The Bridge For Heroes. For services to Supporting Ex-Service Personnel and their Families.
- Ashok Kumar Jackisondas Taylor. Operations Officer, Government Legal Department. For services to Government and especially during Covid-19.
- Darren Richard Taylor. Chief Officer, Norfolk Special Constabulary. For services to Policing and the community in Norfolk.
- Dr. Alison Tedstone. Chief Nutritionist, Public Health England. For services to Public Health.
- Stephen John Terry. For services to Telecommunications, Media and Internet.
- Robert James Thomas. For services to the community in Brockham, Surrey during Covid-19.
- Sharon Ann Thomas. Foster Carer. For services to Children and Young People.
- Geoffrey Robert Thomas. Founder, The Geoff Thomas Foundation. For services to the NHS and Charity.
- Peter Charles Owen Thomas. Police Staff, Strategic Adviser on Mental Health, South Wales Police. For services to Policing.
- Sarah Margaret Thompson. Nursery School Teacher, Orritor Nursery School, Cookstown, County Tyrone. For services to Pre-School Education and Children in Beavers.
- Peter Michael Vardey Thompson. Lately Chief Executive, Association of the British Pharmaceutical Industry. For services to Medicine Supply Resilience and Development.
- Graeme Thompson. For services to Cultural Regeneration in Sunderland.
- Steven Charles Tompkins. For services to Architecture and to the Arts.
- Pauline Anne Town. For services to Homeless People in Ashton under Lyne.
- Lady Susan Janet Elizabeth Trevor. Vice-President, League of Friends of Robert Jones and Agnes Hunt Hospital. For services to Healthcare Charities.
- Claire Twitchin. For services to the community in Teignmouth, Devon particularly during Covid-19.
- Pamela Margaret Ullstein, JP. Magistrate Ealing Bench, Chair of the Greater London Family Panel, and Project Leader Your Life You Choose, Ealing. For services to the Administration of Justice and to Young People.
- Christopher Jamie Varrall. Police Inspector, Sussex Police. For services to Policing.
- Suzanne Ruth Verhoven. Policy Adviser, Department for the Environment, Food and Rural Affairs. For services to Animal Health and Biosecurity.
- Alison Jane Wainwright. Chair, Rutland Foodbank. For services to the community in Rutland.
- Lisa Jayne Wainwright. For services to Sport.
- Dr. Katharine Mary Waldegrave. Founder, First Story and Co-founder, Now Teach. For services to Education and Charity.
- Hilary Ann Walden (Hilary Burns). For services to Basket Making and Heritage Crafts.
- David Robert Walker. Councillor, Cardiff Council. For Political and Public Service.
- Howard John Wardle. For services to the community in Eastbourne, East Sussex.
- Peter John Waters. Executive Director, Visit East of England. For services to the Tourism Industry during Covid-19.
- Huw Thomas Watkins. Composer and Pianist. For services to Music.
- Anita Weir. Faculty Head of Business and Information Technology, Inverurie Academy, Aberdeenshire. For services to Education.
- Arlene Kathleen Linda Wellman. Chief Nurse, Epsom and St Helier University Hospitals NHS Trust. For services to Nursing during Covid-19.
- Dr. Thomas Peter Edward Wells. Consultant Medical Oncologist, University Hospitals Bristol and Weston NHS Foundation Trust. For services to Medicine and People with Disabilities in the Medical Profession.
- Captain Kate West. Aviation Ambassador. For services to Aviation.
- Sophie Westlake. Senior Policy Adviser, Covid-19 Taskforce, Cabinet Office. For public service.
- Catherine Maria Elizabeth Wharton. Senior Manager, National Crime Agency. For service to Law Enforcement during Covid-19.
- Elizabeth Anne Whetham. Executive Headteacher, Holy Trinity Primary School, Halifax. For services to Education.
- Major (Retired) William Hugo White. For services to the Regimental Museum, the Rifles Regimental Association and the community in Padstow, Cornwall.
- Brian Jonathan White. For services to the Jewish community in Manchester.
- Jane Anne Williams. Director of Operations and Family Engagement, Naval Families Federation. For services to Royal Navy Personnel and Families.
- Peter Williams. Chair, Wolverhampton and District MS Therapy Centre. For services to Sufferers of Multiple Sclerosis.
- Patrick Mark Wilson. Deputy Parliamentary Clerk, HM Treasury. For public service.
- Ruth Wilson. Actress. For services to Drama.
- Kathryn Mary Winrow. Chair, Oxford Diocesan Schools Trust, and lately Headteacher, Ranelagh School and National Leader in Education. For services to Education.
- Christopher Philip Frances Wood. Founder, Flying Disabled. For services to Aviation Accessibility.
- Hannah Louise Wood. Deputy Director, Taskforce Europe. For services to EU Negotiations.
- Pauline Ann Woods. Founder, Born Too Soon. For services to Parents and Young People in Kingston-upon-Thames.
- Lawrence James Wright. Principal IT Solution Architect, Sopra Steria. For services to Defence Science and Technology Laboratory.
- Lorraine Wright. For services to Young People through Music.
- Thomas Christopher George Wrigley. Head of Security and Emergency Planning, Birmingham University. For services to Higher Education.
- Peter Xeros. Youth Justice Manager, North Tyneside. For services to Children and Young People.
- Muna Mohamed Rashid Yassin. Managing Director, Fair Finance. For charitable Financial Services to Disadvantaged People during Covid-19.
- George Hossack Young. For voluntary service in the Scottish Borders.
- Charlotte Young. Co-founder, The Girls' Network. For services to Female Empowerment and Young Girls.

Honorary

=== British Empire Medal (BEM) ===
British Empire Medal ribbon

- Dr. Martin Aaron. Founder Chair and Life President, Jewish Association for Mental Illness. For services to Mental Health Awareness and Education.
- Casey Abbott. Store Manager, Iceland Foods. For services to Retail.
- Maureen Elizabeth Adair. For services to Girl Guides Association in Northern Ireland.
- Lynsey Anne Agnew. For services to the Lisburn Foodbank, especially during the Covid-19 Crisis.
- Harmit Ahluwalia. For services to the community in East London during Covid-19.
- Nagina Akhter. For services to the community in Bradford, West Yorkshire during Covid-19.
- Peter Alger. For services to Young People.
- Atif Ali. For services to the community in Birmingham during Covid-19.
- Saiqa Ali. Founder and Chair, Southern Women's Aid Network. For services to the community in South London particularly during Covid-19.
- Syed Masum Ali. Lately Case Handler, Co-Operative Bank. For services to Financial Services and the community in Greater Manchester during the Covid-19 Pandemic.
- John Nicholas Anderson. Volunteer Examiner, Driver and Vehicle Standards Agency. For services to Transport during Covid-19.
- Robert Louis Angira. Senior Manager, Hutchison Ports UK and Club Director, Essex Rebels Junior Basketball Club. For services to Underprivileged Children in Essex through Sport.
- Geoffrey Harold Apperley. Deputy National Welfare Adviser, The Royal Naval Association. For voluntary service in support of Naval Veterans during Covid-19.
- Carol Aston. Police Staff, Designing Out Crime Officer, Cambridgeshire Constabulary. For services to Policing and the community in Ramsey, Cambridgeshire during the Covid-19 Pandemic.
- Claire Louise Austin. For services to the community in Exmouth, Devon during Covid-19.
- Blanche Louise Back. Residential Care Manager, Blind Veterans UK. For services to Visually Impaired Ex-Service Men and Women during Covid-19.
- Harpreet Bains. For services to the community in the London Borough of Ealing during the Covid-19 Pandemic.
- Tracy Jayne Baker. Lately Administrative Officer, HM Courts and Tribunals Service Wales. For services to Organ Donation and to Disability Sport.
- Matthew Howard Baker. Freelance Director, Music and Performance for Creative Arts. For services to Music and the community in Chester during Covid-19.
- Victoria Baldock. Assistant Headteacher, George Carey Church of England Primary School, London Borough of Barking. For services to Education.
- Joanne Lea Balmer. Chief Executive Officer, Oakland Care. For services to Social Care during Covid-19.
- Keith Banks. Lately Head of Security, Imperial War Museum. For services to the Imperial War Museum.
- Eric Crompton Barber. Governor, Elm Wood Primary School, Middleton, Greater Manchester. For services to Education
- Gillian Doris Barker. For services to Public Libraries.
- Sara Barlow. Postmaster, Rainhill Post Office. For services to Business and the community in Rainhill.
- Lyndsey Barrett. Founder, Sport for Confidence. For services to Disability Sport, particularly during the Covid-19 Pandemic.
- Peter Edwin Barty. For services to Charity and the community in Fareham, Hampshire.
- Trevor Thomas Bate. For services to the community in Telford and Wrekin, Shropshire during Covid-19.
- Lee Bates. For services to the community in Tamworth, Staffordshire during Covid-19.
- Carol Geraldine Bates. Founder, Crawley Old Girls. For services to Football and Inclusion.
- James Austin Beardwell. Customer Experience Assistant, J Sainsbury's plc. For services to the Food Supply Chain during Covid-19.
- Adela Beggs. Proprietor and Teacher, Button Moon Pre-School Playgroup, Tandragee, Northern Ireland. For services to Education and Young People.
- Stephen John Betteridge-Sorby. For services to Faith Communities during Covid-19.
- Graham Robert Biss, DL. For services to the community on the Isle of Wight.
- Daniel Benjamin Black. For services to Laser Technology Innovation.
- Emma Jayne Blackmore. For services to the community in Portishead, Somerset during Covid-19.
- Veronica Elaine Blackwood. Personal Assistant, Department for International Trade. For services to Administration.
- George Patrick Blunden. Chair, Charity Bank and The Housing Finance Corporation. For services to Tenants.
- Rachel Booth. For services to the community in Warwickshire during Covid-19.
- Christine Bovingdon-Cox. Misconduct Manager, Thames Valley Police. For services to Policing.
- Jacqueline Patricia Boyce. For services to the community in the London Borough of Hammersmith and Fulham during Covid-19.
- Dorothy Irene Braithwaite. For services to the community in York, North Yorkshire.
- Daniel Robert Branch. For services to the community in Meols, Cheshire during Covid-19.
- Michael Desmond Breakwell. For services to Scouting and to the Social, Mental and Physical Development of Young People in Gwent.
- Paul Brindley. Councillor, Tamworth Borough Council. For services to the community in Tamworth, Staffordshire and Covid-19 Response Projects.
- Naomi Brock. For services to the community in Olney, Buckinghamshire.
- Craig Ashley Browne. For services to Charitable Fundraising and Volunteering during Covid-19.
- John Brownhill. Co-founder, Food4Heroes. For services to the Covid-19 Response.
- Daniel Burke. Store Manager, Iceland Foods. For services to Retail.
- Kate Amanda Butler. For services to the community in Maltby, Rotherham, South Yorkshire and surrounding areas during Covid-19.
- Kiera Abigail Byland. For services to Sport.
- Robert Capella. Police Community Support Officer, West Midlands Police. For services to Policing and the community in Lozells, Birmingham.
- James Carlin. Director, 3SG. For services to Social Enterprise, Interfaith Relations and to the Voluntary Sector during Covid-19.
- Tracy Alison Carr. Chair, Talk It Out In Deal. For services to Mental Health Funding and the community in Deal, Kent.
- Maureen Carroll. For services to the community in Balsall Common, West Midlands.
- Jayne Caslin. For services to the community in Halebank, Cheshire during Covid-19.
- Elaine Edna Cawthraw. For services to the community in Bishopsteignton, Devon during Covid-19.
- Jane Maitland Cepok. For services to the Riding for the Disabled Association, Pony Club and Equestrian Sport.
- Michelle Chapman. For services to the community in Bingley, West Yorkshire during Covid-19.
- Francis Charles. For services to the community in the London Boroughs of Newham, Redbridge and Waltham Forest during Covid-19.
- Catherine Alison Chatters. For services to Biosecurity.
- Stephanie Cherry. Playgroup Leader, Forge Integrated Pre-School Playgroup, Belfast. For services to Pre-School Integrated Education.
- Amanda Chetwynd-Cowieson. For services to Young People.
- Shirley Anne Clark. Lately Trustee and Secretary, Neuroblastoma UK. For services to People with Neuroblastoma.
- Nathan James Clarke. Founder, South Cheshire Amateur Boxing Club. For services to Sport and the community in South Cheshire.
- Edwin Barry Anthony Clarke. Police Staff, Essex Police. For services to Policing and the community in Essex.
- Andrew Cochrane. For services to Disability Sport and Mental Health Awareness.
- Carole Agnes Cockburn. Councillor, Farnham Town Council and Lead Volunteer, Farnham Neighbourhood Plan and Design Statement. For services to Local Government and the community in Farnham.
- Thelma Joy Corkey. Chairwoman, Royal Ulster Constabulary GC Widows' Association. For voluntary and charitable services.
- David Nicholas Cox. For services to the community in Teignbridge, Devon during Covid-19.
- William Kenneth Craig. For services to Cricket and the community in Eglinton.
- Adrian Russel Dale. For services to the community in the Parish of Chelveston-cum-Caldecott, Northamptonshire, particularly during Covid-19.
- Dr. Elizabeth Alexandra Davies. Consultant Geriatrician, Morriston Hospital, Wales. For services to the NHS and Older Patients during the Covid-19 Pandemic.
- Janet Deacon Arnold. Volunteer, Liverpool Hockey Club. For services to Education.
- Peter William Dee. For services to the community in Duxford, Cambridgeshire.
- Santokh Singh Dhaliwal. Coordinator and Treasurer, 50 Plus Group, Indian Community Centre Association Nottingham. For services to the Indian community in Nottingham.
- Lauren Amy Doherty. Founder, Road Safety Talks. For services to Education.
- Claire Duffy. For services to Health and Social Care and the community in Stirlingshire during Covid-19.
- Nigel Arthur Dugmore. Pharmacist, Donnington Pharmacy. For services to Pharmacy and the community in Donnington during Covid-19.
- Angela Mary Dukes. Site Staff, Watford Grammar School for Boys, Hertfordshire. For services to Education.
- Natalie Suzanne Dyson. For services to the community in Taunton, Somerset during Covid-19.
- Leslie Eastlake. For services to the community in St Tudy, Cornwall.
- Louis Charles Edwards. Senior Security Assurance Coordinator and Volunteer, Ministry of Defence Corsham Co-Responder Team. For services to Defence and for voluntary service.
- Christopher Edwards. For services to Learning Disabilities Cricket.
- Colin Elford. Wildlife Ranger, Forestry England. For services to Forestry.
- Pauline Elliot. For services to the Newcastleton Resilience Group during Covid-19.
- Tracey Yvonne Elliott. Manager, Lisburn Unit, St John Ambulance. For voluntary service to St John Ambulance and the community in Northern Ireland.
- Yousif Mohammed Eltom. Leader, Muslim Scout Fellowship Unit Manager, The Scout Association. For services to Scouting and Young People.
- Deana Joan Emerton. For services to the community in Nantwich, Cheshire.
- Daska Emery. For services to the community in Bourne End, Buckinghamshire during Covid-19.
- Tonia Bonita Enderbury. For services to the community in Droitwich Spa and District, Worcestershire.
- Kay Phyllis Sheard English. Traffic Manager, City of London. For services to Transport Management in the City of London, including during the Covid-19 Pandemic.
- Amanda Epe. Founder, Fly Girls. For services to Empowering Women and Girls in the UK and Abroad.
- Gloria June Evans. Councillor, Harworth and Bircotes Town Council. For services to the community in Harworth and Bircotes, South Yorkshire.
- Irene Jane Faloon. For services to the community in Newry and Mourne, Northern Ireland through Barnardo's.
- Alison Fielding. Trustee and Chair, Cardiomyopathy UK. For services to People with Cardiomyopathy.
- Hannah Findlay. Frontline Food Retail Worker, The Co-operative Group. For services to the Food Supply Chain.
- Kathleen Flynn. For services to Food Supply during Covid-19.
- Andrew Martyn Forbes. For services to the community in Wolverton, Buckinghamshire.
- Shaaron Forbes. For services to the community in Wolverton, Buckinghamshire.
- Joanne Foulger. For services to the community in Keswick, Norfolk during Covid-19.
- Luke Thomas Francis. Head Postmaster, Bude. For services to the Post Office and the community in Bude.
- John Gallanders. Chief Officer, Association of Voluntary Organisations in Wrexham. For services to the community in Wrexham.
- Rowenna Ann Garrard-Brown. Carer, Shared Lives. For services to Social Care during Covid-19.
- Lindsay Mary Gell. Coordinator, Team Scrubbers. For services to the NHS during Covid-19.
- Charlotte Ann George. Senior Library Assistant, Libraries Northern Ireland. For services to Libraries.
- Lesley Gilbert. For services to the community in Haversham and Little Linford, Buckinghamshire.
- Pauline Dawn Giles. For services to the community in St Blazey, Cornwall.
- Jacqueline Goodall. Inclusion Support Manager, Sponne School, Towcester, Northamptonshire. For services to Education.
- Professor David William Gray. For services to the Delivery of Testing during Covid-19.
- Jessica Grayson. Watch Manager Control, South Yorkshire Fire and Rescue. For services to Mental Health.
- Leslie William Green. For services to Weightlifting.
- Muriel Anne Green. Ward Councillor, North Tyneside Council. For services to Local Government.
- Amanda Guest. Co-founder, Food4Heroes. For services to the Covid-19 Response.
- Annie Connelly Guthrie. For services to Alcoholics Anonymous during Covid-19.
- Adele Hague. Nurse and Healthy Child Programme Lead, Sheffield Children's NHS Foundation Trust. For services to Public Health during the Covid-19 Pandemic.
- Thomas David Haighton. For services to Adults with Learning and Physical Disabilities.
- Melanie Louise Haman. For public service.
- Tamsin Harris. Deputy Headteacher, Indian Queens Primary School, Cornwall. For services to Education and Voluntary Work.
- Shaw Andrew Harvey. For services to the community in Knottingley, West Yorkshire.
- Nicola Harvey. For services to Health and Social Care and the community in Stirlingshire during Covid-19.
- Wazid Hassan. For services to the community in the London Borough of Redbridge during Covid-19.
- Kim Hatton. For services to Special Educational Needs Families during the Covid-19 Pandemic.
- Danny Hawkins. Facilities Delivery Manager, Network Rail. For services to the Railway.
- Clare Anne Hawkins. Head of Nursing, Cambridgeshire and Peterborough Clinical Commissioning Group. For services to Nursing during the Covid-19 Pandemic.
- Dr. William Alan Hawkshaw. For services to Music and Composing.
- Julie Haylett. For services to the community in West End, Southampton during Covid-19.
- Ruth Elizabeth Hendy. Lead Cancer Nurse, University Hospitals Bristol and Weston NHS Foundation Trust. For services to Cancer Patients.
- Thomas Herbert. For services to the Provision of Chemotherapy Services in East Dunbartonshire and to Purchasing for Universities.
- Janet Hewes. For services to the community in Gnosall and District, Staffordshire.
- Dr. Andrew Kent Hewish. Founder and Volunteer Director, Centre for Recent Drawing. For services to the Arts.
- Eira Margaret Heywood. Co-founder and Trustee, Bolton Adult Autism Support. For services to Families Impacted by Autism and Associated Mental Health Conditions.
- Harold Graham Heywood. Co-founder and Chair of Trustees, Bolton Adult Autism Support. For services to Families Impacted by Autism and Associated Mental Health Conditions.
- Lynne Highy. For services to the community in Eton and Eton Wick, Berkshire during Covid-19.
- Philip Highy. For services to the community in Eton and Eton Wick, Berkshire during Covid-19.
- Norma Diane Higton. For services to the community in Wragby, Lincolnshire during Covid-19.
- Sheila Anne Buchanan Hill. For services to NHS during Covid-19.
- Nicholas David Hindmarsh. Manager, Dartmouth Caring. For services to Vulnerable People during Covid-19.
- Elizabeth Anne Hock. For services to Leicester Rowing Club.
- Dr Martin Frederic Hudson. Founder, Holmes Chapel Music Society. For services to Music.
- Rosemary Louise Hull. Customer Experience Assistant, J Sainsbury's plc. For services to Business.
- Andrea Hurren. For services to the community in Broadclyst, Exeter during Covid-19.
- Abrar Hussain. For services to the community in Halifax, West Yorkshire during Covid-19.
- Mohammed Imran. For services to the community in Bradford, West Yorkshire.
- Kenneth Iredale. Chief Officer, Surrey Police Special Constabulary. For voluntary service to Policing and the Covid-19 Response.
- Humayun Islam. For services to the community in Bradford, West Yorkshire.
- Beatrice Rosemary Jackson. Patron and Emergency Response Volunteer, Cornwall and Scilly Isles. For voluntary service to the British Red Cross.
- Deborah Jackson. For services to Health and Social Care and the community in Stirlingshire during Covid-19.
- Brian Anthony Jaggs. Police Staff, Deputy Head of IT, Essex and Kent Police. For services to Policing and the Covid-19 Response.
- Gertrude Olive Jamison. For services to Music in County Down.
- Ann Johnson. Teacher, St Michael's High School, Chorley. For services to Education.
- Hazel Claire Johnson. Parent Support Adviser, Berrycoombe Primary School, Bodmin, Cornwall. For services to Education.
- Ian Gareth Jones. For services to the community in Dorking, Surrey during Covid-19.
- Reverend Christine Margaret Jones. Founder, Working for Food Justice, West Cheshire Foodbank. For services to the community in West Cheshire during Covid-19.
- Brian Jones. Chairman, The Moses Project. For voluntary service.
- Susan Ruth Jones. For services to the NHS, Palliative Care and the community in Gwent.
- Bashir Kara. For services to Tennis.
- Pooja Kawa. Manufacturing Strategy Lead, Vaccines Taskforce, Department for Business, Energy and Industrial Strategy. For services to the Development of a Covid-19 Vaccine.
- Frederick David Donald Keith. Adviser, Taskforce Europe, The Prime Minister's Office. For services to Taskforce Europe.
- Raj Wali Khan. For services to the community in Aylesbury, Buckinghamshire.
- Kathryn Kilburn. Teacher, Robert Mellors Primary, Nottingham. For services to Education.
- Catherine Theresa Kilday. For services to Charity in Manchester.
- Michael David Killeen. For services to the community in Hursley, Hampshire during Covid-19.
- Matthew William Killick. UK Director, Crisis Response and Community Resilience, British Red Cross. For services during Covid-19.
- Stephen Esmond Kimbell. For services to the community in Milton Keynes, Buckinghamshire.
- Jacqueline Knight. Consumer Policy and Enforcement Manager, Civil Aviation Authority. For services to Consumers.
- Manoj Kumar Lal. Immigration Officer, Immigration Enforcement, Home Office. For services to Assisting Vulnerable Migrants in the West Midlands.
- Peter McIntyre Lamont. Volunteer and Expedition Assessor, Duke of Edinburgh's Bronze, Silver and Gold Award Scheme. For services to Young People.
- Paul Charles Latimer. For services to the community in Leighton Buzzard, Bedfordshire during Covid-19.
- Michelle Law. Bursar, Meadows Care Home. For services to Care Home Residents particularly during the Covid-19 Pandemic.
- Julie Lawson. Customer Services Adviser, Personal Tax Operations, HM Revenue and Customs. For Voluntary and Charitable Services.
- Peter Outram Lawson. For services to Art and the community in Rutland.
- Lynda Leadbetter. For services to the community in Greater Manchester during Covid-19.
- Leathia Adassa Lee. For services to Librarianship.
- Rosemary Ann Ley. For services to Building Safety.
- Kevin Richard Leyman. Fleet Engineer, South Western Ambulance Service NHS Foundation Trust. For services to the NHS particularly during the Covid-19 Pandemic.
- Simon Lancelot Lloyd. Employee, Network Rail. For services to Cycling and to Charity.
- David James Lloyd. Founder, Second Chance. For voluntary service.
- Stuart Long. For services to the community in Southend, Essex.
- Roy MacPenfield Grant. For services to the community in Newport and the BAME community in South Wales.
- Dr. Stephen Macvicar. Chair, Seiriol Alliance, and Founding Member, Seiriol Good Turn Scheme. For voluntary services to Vulnerable People in Wales.
- Lynda Joan Malley. For services to Girlguiding and the community in Merseyside.
- Rhys Andrew Mallows. Managing Director, Hensol Castle Distillery. For services to the NHS and Key Workers during the Covid-19 Pandemic.
- Samantha Marley. Branch Staff, Barclays. For services to Financial Services and the community in Hastings during the Covid-19 Pandemic.
- Elizabeth Mawson. For services to the community in Seascale, Cumbria during Covid-19.
- Peter Anthony McAteer. Project and Activities Coordinator, Clanrye Group. For services to Young People in Newry, Mourne and South Armagh.
- Deborah McClelland. Police Community Support Officer, Cleveland Police. For services to Policing and the community in Middlesbrough.
- Angela McConnell. For services to the community in Bramley, West Yorkshire.
- Philip MConnell. For services to the community in Bramley, West Yorkshire.
- Stephen John McCoy. Fundraiser, Sanctuary of Our Lady of Lourdes. For services to the community and Charity in Toomebridge, County Antrim.
- William Raymond McCullough. For services to Motorbike Racing in Northern Ireland.
- Breege McCusker. For services to World War II History in County Fermanagh.
- Brenda McCutcheon. Sewing Teacher, Newcastle Adult Education. For services to Adult Education.
- Pamela Mary McDiarmid. For services to Marie Curie Nurses and the community in Aberfeldy, Scotland.
- Adam McEvoy. For services to Disabled and Young People through Sport.
- Catherine Elizabeth McGill. For services to the Arts.
- John Ian Michael McKay. For services to community in Basildon, Essex.
- Sylvia McKeegan. For services to the community in Londonderry.
- Claire McKen. For services to Families with Special Educational Needs during Covid-19.
- Trevor McKendry. Maintenance Foreman, Education Authority, Northern Ireland. For services to Education.
- Bernadette McKiernan. Crew Manager, Snaith Fire Station, Humberside Fire and Rescue Services. For services to the community in Humberside.
- Violet Ann McLellan. Assistant Day Services Manager, Learning Difficulties (Castell y Dail), Powys County Council. For services to Adults with Learning Difficulties.
- Margaret McNellis. For services to Music and Charity in County Armagh.
- David Colm McNicholl. Chief Executive, Warrington Youth Club. For services to Young People during Covid-19.
- Amanda Jane Medlyn. For services to the community in Albrighton, Shropshire.
- Kerry Anne Metcalfe. Care Manager, Melody Care. For services to Social Care during Covid-19.
- Amalia Rachel Michaels. Vice Chairman, University of the Third Age, London. For services to Education.
- Janet Eleanor Moffat. For services to Charity in The Scottish Borders and Overseas.
- Rhian Fiona Monteith. Founder, The High Intensity User Programme. For services to People Who Access the NHS.
- William Stephen Moore. For services to Community Engagement, Business Contribution and Charity in Northern Ireland.
- Graham William Moran. For services to Football and the community in Nottingham.
- Andrew Peter Morgan. Visits Officer and Water Safety Volunteer, Royal National Lifeboat Institution, Shoreham Lifeboat Station. For services to the Royal National Lifeboat Institution.
- Mahtab Morovat. For services to Charity in Sunderland, Tyne and Wear.
- Paul David Morris. Detachment Commander, Devon Army Cadet Force. For voluntary service to Young People in Plymouth.
- David Musgrove. Co-founder and Chair, British Disabled Water Ski Association. For services to Disabled People in Torbay, Devon.
- David Elliot Myers. Chair, Royal Free Organ Donation Committee. For services to Renal Patients.
- Qamar Nawaz. Frontline Food Retail Worker, The Co-operative Group. For services to the Food Supply Chain.
- Reverend Hannah Lerina Neale. For services to the community in the London Borough of Merton during Covid-19.
- Julie Elizabeth Nelson. For services to Women's Football.
- Adama Louise Newlove (Aly Newlove). Policy Officer, Cabinet Office. For services to Exiting the EU.
- Chloë Simone Newman. For services to the Manufacturing of PPE in Tenterden, Kent during Covid-19.
- Ronald John Nicol. For services to Amateur Drama and the community of Glenrothes.
- Isabel Norma Gilchrist Nicol. For services to Amateur Drama and the community in Glenrothes.
- Pamela-Ann Nugent. Personal Secretary, Executive Officer 2, Department of Finance. For services to Men and Boys with Eating Disorders in Northern Ireland.
- Mavis Nye. Chief Executive, The Mavis Nye Foundation. For services to People with Mesothelioma.
- Katherine Sarah O'Sullivan. Deputy Chair, British Rowing. For services to Rowing.
- Joyce Obaseki. Founder, Grant A Smile. For services to Vulnerable People and the community in Loughton especially during Covid-19.
- Orighoye Onuwaje. Tax Specialist in Complex Evasion, HM Revenue and Customs. For services to Professional Development.
- Henry Terry Palton-Gaspard. Founder, Tottenham Black Arrows Badminton Club. For services to Community Sport.
- Rajendra Parshotam Popat Pankhania. For services to Older People and to the community in Stanmore, North London.
- Dr. Karen Elizabeth Parker. Flood and Coastal Risk Management Adviser, Environment Agency. For services to Equality, Diversity and Inclusion.
- Idris Patel. Chief Executive Officer, Supporting Humanity. For services to the community in Ilford, London Borough of Redbridge during Covid-19.
- Brian William Paterson. For services to the community in Aboyne and Deeside, Scotland.
- Leigh Miranda Patience. For services to the Somme Nursing Home for Military Veterans during the Covid-19 Crisis.
- Gordon Albert Patrick. Chairman, Chalfont St Giles Parish Council. For services to the community in Chalfont St Giles.
- Jacqueline Marta Payne. Carer, Shared Lives. For services to Social Care during Covid-19.
- Colin Stephen Payne. Carer, Shared Lives. For services to Social Care during Covid-19.
- Valerie Elizabeth Peacock. For services to the Children's Hospice, Northern Ireland.
- Nicholas William Penny. For services to the community in Coleford, Gloucestershire during Covid-19.
- Jane Alison Peplow. For services to Charitable Fundraising and Voluntary Work.
- Stephanie Phillip. For services to Dance and Musical Theatre.
- Roger Joseph Pickett. For services to the community in Coleford, Gloucestershire during Covid-19.
- Ernest Ronald Pickles. For services to Young People and the community in West Yorkshire.
- Nina Joy Pierson. For services to the community in Devon during Covid-19.
- Victoria Pooley. For services to the community in Hitchin, Hertfordshire.
- Katharine Hazel Porter. For services to the community in the London Borough of Islington during Covid-19.
- Reginald Pound. For services to the community in Poole, Dorset during Covid-19.
- Jon Pratten. Chief Executive Officer, Jubilee House Care Trust. For services to People with Learning Disabilities in Hertfordshire during Covid-19.
- Caesar President. For services to the community in the London Borough of Hammersmith and Fulham during Covid-19.
- Liam Benjamin Preston. For services to Young People.
- Dr Claire Louise Prosser. Founder, Spectropolis. For services to Children and Adults with Autism Spectrum Disorder and their Families.
- Dyddanwy Lydia Jean Pugh. Office Manager, Welsh Parliament. For Public and Political Service.
- Proshanta Lal Datta Purokayastha. For services to the Bangladesh Hindu Association (UK).
- Mohammad Jamil Radha. Healthcare Assistant, Epsom and St Helier University Hospitals NHS Trust. For services to the NHS during Covid-19.
- Steven Ray. For services to the community in Lutterworth, Leicestershire during Covid-19.
- Matthew Read. Head Sailmaker, Suffolk Sails. For services to Frontline Health Workers throughout the Covid-19 Pandemic.
- Susan Yvonne Rees. For services to Healthcare.
- Graham Riding. For services to the community in Leyland, Lancashire.
- Reverend Anne Catharina Rigelsford. For services to the community in Cambridge, Cambridgeshire.
- Karen Jean Roberts. For services to the community in St Tudy, Cornwall.
- Linda Anne Robinson. Chief Executive, Age NI. For services to Older People and to the Royal Naval Reserve.
- Louise Rogers. For services to NHS Wales in Logistics and Supply Chain Management.
- Linda Ruston. Manager, New Horizons Day Centre. For services to Social Care.
- Mohammed Saeed. Vice Chairman, Community First, Peterborough. For services to the community in Peterborough.
- Gloria Saffrey-Powell. Director, CARIS Haringey. For voluntary and charitable services to Homeless People in the London Borough of Haringey during Covid-19.
- Ian Stuart Sands. Marine Engineer. For services to the community in Northern Ireland.
- Nikhil Santos. Catering Manager, St Mary's University, Twickenham. For services to Higher Education.
- Kevin Gordon Satchwell. For services to the community in Melton Mowbray, Leicestershire during Covid-19.
- Simon Peter Scammell. Head Sailmaker, Suffolk Sails. For services to Frontline Health Workers throughout the Covid-19 Pandemic.
- Sharon Elizabeth Scrivens. Voluntary Fundraiser, Cirencester Relay for Life, Ashley Scrivens Foundation. For services to Charity.
- Maria Shakespeare. Volunteer, People's Choice, Crabtree Community Centre. For voluntary service.
- Monica Sharp. Central London Committee Member, Fundraising Branch, Royal National Lifeboat Institution. For services to the Royal National Lifeboat Institution.
- Pauline Sharratt. SENCO and Deputy Head, Alexandra School, Kingston-upon-Thames. For services to Children and Young People with Special Educational Needs and Disabilities.
- Lynda Shepherd. For services to the community in Kilndown, Kent.
- Heather Angela Shepherd. For services to Tameside East Foodbank during Covid-19.
- Penelope Wynn Shepherd. For voluntary service to the Duke of Edinburgh Award Scheme in Aberdeenshire and The Gambia.
- Stewart Shepherd. Founder and Chair, Hospice Hope. For services to the community in Leicestershire.
- Abigail Kathryn Sheridan de Graaff. For services to the Warwickshire Scrubbers and to the provision of PPE during Covid-19.
- Robert Ramsay Collingwood Sherman. Co-founder, Harbury E-Wheels. For services to the community in Harbury, Warwickshire particularly during Covid-19.
- John Montgomerie Nadin Sidebotham. Employee and Health and Wellbeing Volunteer, Network Rail. For services to Wellbeing during Covid-19.
- David Christopher Simmonds. Diary Manager, Government Office for Science. For services to Government Science.
- Helen Wendy Simmonds. Manager, Lakeside Nursing Home, Cardiff. For services to Older People.
- Philip Jonathan Small. For services to Hospitality, to Vulnerable People and to Charity in London during Covid-19.
- Margaret Frances Smith, JP. For services to the community in Keighley, West Yorkshire.
- Sharon Rosemary Smith. For services to the Girls' Brigade and to the community in Whiterock, West Belfast.
- Gillian Ruth Smith. Secretary to the Board of Trustees, Imperial War Museum. For services to the Imperial War Museum.
- Kerry Snuggs. Founder, Acts of Kindness Community. For voluntary and charitable services to Vulnerable People during Covid-19.
- Paul Henry Speight. For services to Scouts in Northern Ireland.
- Joy Mary Spreadborough. For services to Marie Curie Hospice, Northern Ireland particularly during Covid-19.
- Dawn Stanford. For services to the community in Tunbridge Wells, Kent particularly during Covid-19.
- Alison Stannard. Services Manager, Sight Support Hull and East Yorkshire. For services to People with Visual Impairments particularly during Covid-19.
- Trevor Staveley. Co-ordinator, Torbay Street Pastors. For services to Vulnerable People and to the promotion of Safer Streets in Torbay, Devon.
- Molly Bufton Stear. For services to the community in Kenilworth, Warwickshire during Covid-19.
- Anna Rosemary Steele. For services to Cross Community Relations in Northern Ireland.
- Kristin Michelle Stevenson. For services to the community in Ticehurst, East Sussex during Covid-19.
- Paul Sved. For services to Holocaust Education and Awareness.
- Barbara Swinn. For services to Explore York Library and Archive Service and to the community in York.
- Christina Taylor. Cleaner, Pendle Primary Academy, Lancashire. For services to Education.
- Kenneth Alan Edward Taylor. Writer, Manager, Director and Actor. For services to Theatre and Pantomime.
- Tracey Janet Telford. For services to Tackling Covid-19.
- Tarek Fared Moustafa Thoma. Owner, The Oven Restaurant. For services to the community in Middlesbrough and Key Workers during the Covid-19 Pandemic.
- Thomas Lincoln Thomas. For services to Education, Horticulture and the community in Maryburgh, Highland.
- Janet Mary Thompson. For services to the community in Uppingham, Rutland.
- Samuel Kenneth Thomson. For services to Gaelic Choral Music.
- Elizabeth Mary Timmons. Voluntary Inpatient Unit Assistant, Peace Hospice Care. For services to Terminally Ill Patients.
- Dr. Noel Harwood Tredinnick. For services to Church Music and to Music Education.
- Sandra Turner. Manager, Triangles After School Club Scheme, Liss, Hampshire. For services to Children.
- Reha Begum Ullah. Trustee, Muslimah Sports Association. For services to Sport.
- Daksha Varsani. For services to the community in London during Covid-19.
- Tracy Lynn Waldron. For services to the community in Chadlington, Oxfordshire during Covid-19.
- Melanie Ann Walker. For services to the community in Allonby, Cumbria, during Covid-19.
- Deborah Elizabeth Walker. For services to the community in Belfast.
- Alwyn John Griffin Warnock. Senior Planning Officer, Northern Ireland Ambulance Service. For services to Road Safety in Northern Ireland.
- Bjorn Hugh Henry Watson. For services to the community in Shrivenham, Oxfordshire during Covid-19.
- Donna Angelique Webster. Deputy Head of Communications, Surrey and Sussex Healthcare NHS Trust. For services to the NHS particularly during the Covid-19 Pandemic.
- Valerie Anne Wells. For services to the community in Olney, Buckinghamshire.
- Xavier Charles Claude Wiggins. For services to the community in South West London during Covid-19.
- Andrew Wileman. For services to the community in Bournemouth.
- Dr. Jeremy Huw Williams. Opera Singer. For services to Music and Charity.
- Florence Willis. For services to Local Government.
- Jonathan Wilson. For services to the community in Folkestone, Kent during Covid-19.
- Colin Wong. Senior Professional Tutor in Education and Faculty Senior Academic Adviser, Primary Teacher Education, Liverpool Hope University. For services to Education.
- Robert Alexander Yarr. For services to Church Choral Music in Ballinderry Parish Church.

=== Royal Red Cross ===
Royal Red Cross ribbon

==== Members of the Royal Red Cross (RRC) ====
- Colonel Sharon Findlay

==== Associates of the Royal Red Cross (ARRC) ====
- Staff Sergeant Tracey Ann Culley. Queen Alexandra's Royal Army Nursing Corps

=== Queen's Police Medal (QPM) ===
Queen's Police Medal ribbon

England and Wales

- Stewart Paul Bladen, Constable, West Midlands Police.
- Alexis Bryan Boon, Detective Chief Superintendent, Metropolitan Police Service.
- Mohammad Wasim Chaudhry, Chief Superintendent, Greater Manchester Police.
- Lucy Clare D’Orst, Chief Constable, British Transport Police.
- Lee Graham, Detective Chief Inspector, Metropolitan Police Service.
- Craig Lewis Guildford, Chief Constable, Nottinghamshire Police.
- Richard James List, Detective Chief Superintendent, Thames Valley Police.
- Christopher Michael Madden, Constable, West Yorkshire Police.
- Dennis William Murray, Chief Superintendent, Northamptonshire Police.
- Mark Keith Payne, Detective Chief Superintendent, West Midlands Police.
- Bhupinder Kaur Rai, Temporary Chief Superintendent, Thames Valley Police.
- Stephen Rayland, Temporary Chief Superintendent, Sussex Police.
- Martin Snowden, Detective Chief Superintendent, West Yorkshire Police.
- Gavin John Stephens, Chief Constable, Surrey Police.
- Rachel Julie Swann, Chief Constable, Derbyshire Constabulary.
- Meldin Victor Thomas, lately Sergeant, Leicestershire Police.
- Susan Thurley, lately Detective Constable, Metropolitan Police Service.
- Terence Woods, Deputy Chief Constable, Lancashire Constabulary.

Scotland

- Roderick Newbigging, Chief Superintendent, Police Service of Scotland.
- Fiona Helen Taylor, Deputy Chief Constable, Police Service of Scotland.

Northern Ireland

- Kenneth Bailey, Reserve Constable, Police Service of Northern Ireland.
- James Clifford Campbell, Sergeant, Police Service of Northern Ireland.
- Arthur James Davidson, Superintendent, Police Service of Northern Ireland.

=== Queen's Fire Service Medal (QFSM) ===
Queen's Fire Service Medal ribbon

England and Wales

- Stephen Apter, Deputy Chief Fire Officer, Hampshire and Isle of Wight Fire and Rescue Service.
- Antony Darren Clark, Watch Manager, Humberside Fire and Rescue Service.
- Rose Elizabeth Fearnley, Watch Manager, North Yorkshire Fire and Rescue Service.
- Fleur Holland, Firefighter, South Yorkshire Fire and Rescue Service.
- Alexandra Johnson, Chief Fire Officer, South Yorkshire Fire and Rescue Service.
- Darryl Anthony Keen, Chief Fire Officer, Hertfordshire Fire and Rescue Service.

Scotland

- Carole Rosemary Glendinning, Firefighter Control, Scottish Fire and Rescue Service.

=== Queen's Ambulance Medal (QAM) ===
Queen's Ambulance Medal ribbon

England and Wales

- Dr. Fionna Patricia Moore, MBE, Executive Medical Director, South East Coast Ambulance Service.
- Jason David Morris, Clinical Team Manager, London Ambulance Service.
- Simon Kent Swallow, Strategic Head of Emergency Preparedness Resilience & Response (EPRR), North East Ambulance Service.
- Andrew Swinburn, Associate Director of Paramedicine, Welsh Ambulance Service.
- Susan Jane Owen Williams, Nurse Adviser, Welsh Ambulance Service.

Scotland

- William Kinniburgh, Strategic Operations Manager, Scottish Ambulance Service.
- Trevor Spowart, General Manager Fleet, Scottish Ambulance Service.

Northern Ireland

- Dennis Bryan Snoddy, Assistant Director of Operations, Northern Ireland Ambulance Service.

=== Queen's Volunteer Reserves Medal (QVRM) ===
Queen's Volunteer Reserves Medal ribbon

Army

- Warrant Officer Class 2 Andrew David Eke, VR. Royal Logistic Corps, Army Reserve
- Colonel Thammy Evans, VR. Army Reserve
- Major Cyril Stevenson, VR. Royal Logistic Corps, Army Reserve
- Warrant Officer Class 2 Samuel Stewart Vandal, VR. Corps of Royal Engineers, Army Reserve

Royal Air Force

- Acting Corporal Jane Elizabeth Jones, Royal Air Force.
- Warrant Officer John Campbell Webster, VR, Royal Air Force.

== Crown Dependencies ==
Guernsey

- Stuart Falla CBE
- Clare Sealy OBE
- Richard Axton MBE
- Anthony Creasey MBE
- Patricia Child BEM

Jersey

- Katie Le Quesne MBE
- Brian Follain BEM

Isle of Man

- Howard Quayle CBE
- Christopher Sharpe MBE
- Joan Marilyn Cannel BEM

== Australia ==
The 2021 Queen's Birthday Honours for Australia were announced on 14 June 2021 by the Governor-General, David Hurley.

== New Zealand ==
The 2021 Queen's Birthday Honours for New Zealand were announced on 7 June 2021.

== Cook Islands ==
Below are the individuals appointed by Elizabeth II in her right as Queen of the Cook Islands, on the recommendation of the Ministers of the Cook Islands.

=== Order of the British Empire ===
==== Officer of the Order of the British Empire (OBE) ====
Civil

- Ian Karika Wilmott – For services to the Community and to Public Service.

==== Member of the Order of the British Empire (MBE) ====
Civil

- George George Brian Williamson – For services to the Community and to Public Service.

=== British Empire Medal (BEM) ===
Civil

- Akarotoua John Marsters – For services to the Community and to Public Service.
- Te Pu Tangi Rua Teurukura Kare Mose – For services to the Community and to Public Service

== The Bahamas ==
Below are the individuals appointed by Elizabeth II in her right as Queen of the Commonwealth of The Bahamas, on the advice of Her Majesty's Bahamas Ministers.

=== Order of the British Empire ===
==== Officer of the Order of the British Empire (OBE) ====
Civil

- Errol Winston Bethel – For Public Service.

== Grenada ==
Below are the individuals appointed by Elizabeth II in her right as Queen of Grenada, on the advice of Her Majesty's Grenada Ministers.

=== Order of the British Empire ===
==== Officer of the Order of the British Empire (OBE) ====
Civil

- Dr. Clinton Lewis – For services to the Humanities.

==== Member of the Order of the British Empire (MBE) ====
Civil

- George Francis Fletcher – For services to the Humanities.

=== British Empire Medal (BEM) ===
Civil

- Evans Gooding – For services to Agriculture.
- Leonard Joy Peters – For services to Agriculture.

== Solomon Islands ==
Below are the individuals appointed by Elizabeth II in her right as Queen of Solomon Islands, on the advice of Her Majesty's Solomon Island Ministers.

=== Order of the British Empire ===
==== Knight Commander of the Order of the British Empire (KBE) ====
- Moon Pin Literati Quan, OBE – For services to Commerce, to National Development, to the Community and to Youth Development.

==== Officer of the Order of the British Empire (OBE) ====
Civil

- Margaret Teleone Bartlett – For services to Commerce, to Women's Development and to the Community.
- Michael Ben Walahoula – For services to the Nation in peace building, to Scouts Development and to the Community.
- Michael Wate – For services to Commerce, to National Development and to Community Advancement.

==== Member of the Order of the British Empire (MBE) ====
Civil

- Dr. Transform Aqorau – For services to National and Regional Development and to the Diplomatic Service.
- Captain Joshua Makai – For services to Seamanship, to the Church and to Rural Development.

=== Queen's Police Medal (QPM) ===
- Oliver Twist Osi, Chief Superintendent, Royal Solomon Islands Police Force – For services to the Police, to National Security, to Peace and to the Community.

== Saint Lucia ==
Below are the individuals appointed by Elizabeth II in her right as Queen of Saint Lucia, on the advice of Her Majesty's Saint Lucia Ministers.

=== Order of the British Empire ===
==== Commander of the Order of the British Empire (CBE) ====
Civil

- Frederick Nicholas Paul Devaux, CMG – For services to the Community.

==== Officer of the Order of the British Empire (OBE) ====
Civil

- Eaton Bethel Junior Baptiste – For services to Business.
- Dr. Leonard Surage – For services to Medicine.

==== Member of the Order of the British Empire (MBE) ====
Civil

- Keithlin Caroo – For Humanitarian Services.
- Laurencia Allison Jean – For services to Health and to Public Service.
- Vernon Cyril Ralph Lewis – For services to Sport.
- Pastor Roger Stephen – For services to the Community.

=== British Empire Medal (BEM) ===
Civil

- Rashid Khalil Jean-Baptiste – For services to the Business Community.
- Olivia Felicien Clery – For services to Agriculture.
- Darius Nixon Dujon – For services to Agriculture.
- Cyprian Linus Gilroy Hall – For services to Education, to Sport and to Entertainment.
- Lina Prescod – For Public Service.

== Antigua and Barbuda ==
Below are the individuals appointed by Elizabeth II in her right as Queen of Antigua and Barbuda, on the advice of Her Majesty's Antigua and Barbuda Ministers.

=== Order of the British Empire ===
==== Member of the Order of the British Empire (MBE) ====
Civil

- Stedroy Franklyn Theodore Braithwaite – For services to Economic and Community Development in Antigua and Barbuda.

=== Queens Police Medal (QPM) ===
- Claudette Brathwaite Mason – For services to the Royal Police Force of Antigua and Barbuda.

== See also ==
- Australian honours system
- New Zealand royal honours system
- Orders, decorations, and medals of the United Kingdom
- 2021 Canadian Honours List
