= Heather Currie =

Gynaecologist

Heather Currie MBE, FRCOG, MRCGP, DRCOG
- Known for: Contributions to Obstetrics and Gynecology

Heather Currie is British associate specialist gynaecologist. Her work relates specifically to menopause and she is the founder of Menopause Matters, a web resource providing to the public up-to-date, accurate information about the health at the menopause, menopause at work menopausal symptoms and treatment options.

== Career ==
Currie works at NHS Dumfries and Galloway. She is the Scottish National Clinical Lead for modernizing gynaecology outpatients.

She is the managing director of Menopause Matters and a Trustee of the British Menopause Society.

The British Menopause Society (BMS) is a specialist society associated with the Royal College of Obstetricians and Gynaecologists. It was established in 1989 to educate and guide Healthcare professionals on menopause and all aspects of post reproductive health. Currie is co-editor of their quarterly journal Post Reproductive Health and was Chair of the Society in 2016-2017. Her research supports ensuring that all healthcare professionals have a basic understanding of the menopause and know where to signpost women for advice, support and treatment whenever appropriate.

Currie has written several books and papers including Menopause: Essentials: Expert And Practical Advice; Your Most Vital Questions Answered and a Web-based survey on the effect of menopause on women's libido in a computer-literate population. She encourages women to consult healthcare professionals about their symptoms, particularly when those are having a significant effect on work life, social life, home life and sex life.

Currie was appointed a Member of the Order of the British Empire (MBE) for services to Healthcare in the 2021 Birthday Honours.
