= Meera Naran =

British pharmacist and road safety campaigner

Meera Naran MBE FHEA

Meera Naran MBE is a British pharmacist and road safety campaigner.

== Campaigning ==
Naran's eight‑year‑old son, Dev, was killed in a road traffic collision on the M6 motorway in 2018 where the hard shoulder had been removed as part of a smart motorway. Naran began campaigning for changes to smart motorways.

Naran was invested as a Member of the British Empire (MBE) in the 2021 Birthday Honours for "services to Road Safety".
