= Matt Keeling =

British academic in epidemic modelling

Matthew James Keeling OBE (born June 1970) is a professor in the Mathematics Institute and the School of Life Sciences of the University of Warwick. He has been the editor of the journal Epidemics since 2007.

Keeling was appointed Officer of the Order of the British Empire (OBE) in the 2021 Birthday Honours for services to SAGE during the COVID-19 response.

== Awards ==
- Philip Leverhulme Prize in Mathematics (2005)
- Royal Zoological Society of London, Scientific Medal (2007)
