= Philip Augar =

British writer

Sir Philip Augar is a British author, and was an equities broker in the City of London, England for twenty years from the 1970s, first with NatWest and J. Henry Schroder, and was part of the team that negotiated the sale of Schroders investment bank to Citigroup.

Augar holds a doctorate in history and was a visiting fellow at Cranfield School of Management.

He was knighted in the 2021 Birthday Honours for services to higher and further education policy after chairing the Post-18 Education and Funding Review.

== Works ==
- " Rajan roundtable: Break up the banks", The Economist, April 9th 2009
- "National interests". The New Statesman. 8 January 2010.
- "A Better Way to Break Up the Banks", Harvard Business Review, February 4, 2010
- The Death of Gentlemanly Capitalism: The Rise and Fall of London's Investment Banks (Penguin, 2000)
- The Greed Merchants: How the Investment Banks Played the Free Market Game (Penguin, 2005).
- Chasing Alpha: How Reckless Growth and Unchecked Ambition Ruined the City's Golden Decade, Bodley Head 2009 (also published by Vintage Books as Reckless: The Rise and Fall of the City, 1997-2008)
- “The Bank That Lived a Little: Barclays in the Age of the Very Free Market” (Allen Lane, 2018).
