= Mark Emberton =

- Occupation: Urologist
- Known for: Prostate Cancer Research

Academic work
- Institutions: University College London; University College London Hospital

Mark Emberton OBE is a urologist and prostate cancer research specialist using novel imaging techniques and minimally invasive treatments to improve diagnosis and treatment of prostate cancer.

Emberton is Professor of Interventional oncology at University College London and dean of its Faculty of Medical Sciences. and is honorary consultant urological surgeon at University College Hospital. He serves as founding pioneer of the charity Prostate Cancer UK.

Emberton is author of over 450 peer-reviewed articles on prostate cancer and urology-related topics in scientific journals, including The New England Journal of Medicine, The Lancet and The BMJ. His work has been cited almost 30,000 times.

== Early life and education ==
Emberton was born in Edinburgh. He was educated at St Boniface's Catholic College before graduating from St Mary's Hospital Medical School with a Bachelor of Medicine/Bachelor of Surgery in clinical medicine in 1985. During his time at St. Mary's, he completed an Intercalated BSc in psychology at Bedford College (1983). He gained a Doctor of Medicine degree in 1997 following a period of research at the Clinical Effectiveness Unit at the Royal College of Surgeons of England, where he led the national Prostatectomy Audit.

He was awarded a sub-specialty Fellowship of the Royal Colleges of Surgeons (FRCS Urol.) in 1997.

== Research and career ==
Emberton is professor of interventional oncology at University College London and was appointed dean of its Faculty of Medical Sciences in 2015. He is also a clinical consultant and surgeon at University College Hospital, London, where he diagnoses and treats patients with prostate cancer.

Emberton has a track record in taking ideas through the various phases of evaluation with the result of these ideas becoming a part of routine practice. He did this with self-management of lower urinary tract symptoms, with magnetic resonance imaging for men at risk of prostate cancer and, most recently, with tissue preserving therapies for prostate cancer.

He oversaw the trial of multi-parametric MRI scanning as a first-line investigation for prostate cancer. The approach was approved by The National Institute for Health and Care Excellence (NICE) in May 2019.

Emberton is chief investigator in The Medical Research Centre (MRC) and Cancer Research UK-funded ReIMAGINE Prostate Cancer study which is looking at the determinants and consequences of MRI abnormalities in men

Emberton and his team of researchers are exploring the role of focal therapy in men with prostate cancer. The technique minimises damage to surrounding that tends to occur with surgery or radiotherapy. He led the evaluation of vascular targeted photo-therapy though phase I to phase III.

== Honours and awards ==
- The BMJ Awards 2019: UK Research Paper of the Year for the PRECISION trial into MRI scanning for prostate cancer diagnosis
- Golden Telescope BAUS Award 2007 for outstanding urologist within ten years of appointment

Emberton was elected a Fellow of the Academy of Medical Sciences in 2016. He was appointed Officer of the Order of the British Empire (OBE) in the 2021 Birthday Honours for services to research and prostate cancer.
