= Geography of Thailand =

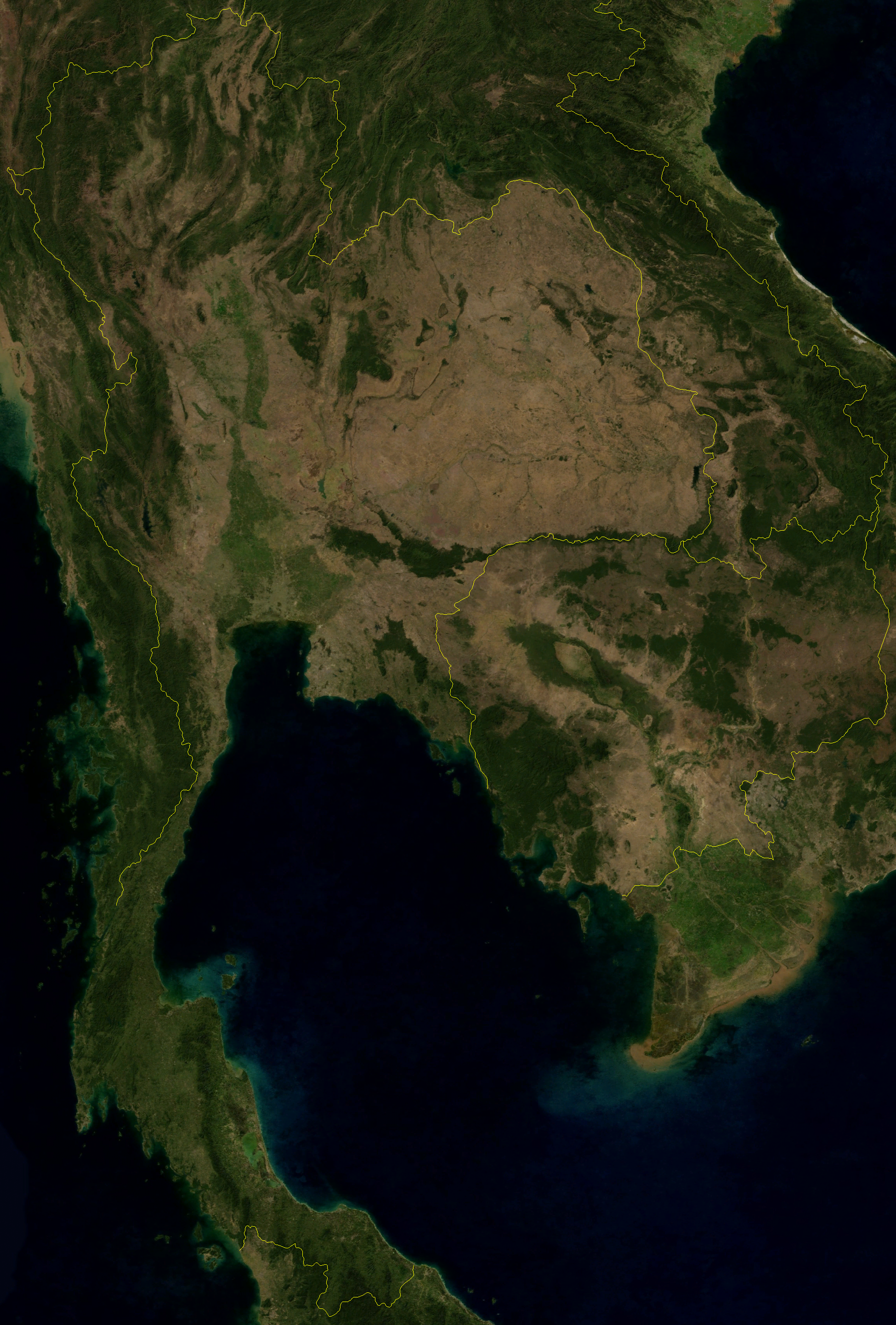
- Satellite view of Thailand
- Continent: Asia
- Region: Mainland Southeast Asia
- Area: Ranked 50th
  - Total: 513,120 km^{2} (198,120 sq mi)
  - Land: 99.57%
  - Water: 0.43%
- Coastline: 2,815 km (1,749 mi)
- Borders: Total: 5,656 km (3,514 mi); Myanmar: 2,401 km (1,492 mi); Laos: 1,810 km (1,125 mi); Cambodia: 798 km (496 mi); Malaysia: 647 km (402 mi)
- Highest point: Doi Inthanon; 2,565 m (8,415 ft)
- Lowest point: Boh Yai mine −106 m (−348 ft)
- Longest river: Nan–Chao Phraya; 1,112 km (691 mi); Mekong River; 980 km (610 mi); Chi River; 765 km (475 mi)
- Largest lake: Songkhla Lake; 1,040 km^{2} (400 sq mi)
- Climate: Tropical savanna climate (most), Tropical monsoon climate (majority of south and far east) Tropical rainforest climate (part of south)
- Terrain: High mountains, a central plain, and an upland plateau
- Natural hazards: Droughts, rising sea levels, soil erosion
- Exclusive economic zone: 305,778 km^{2} (118,062 mi^{2})

Thailand is a sovereign state located in the center of Mainland Southeast Asia. The country extends from the southeastern foothills of the Himalayas to the Mekong river, further south to the Gulf of Thailand, and roughly to the middle of the Malay Peninsula and the Andaman Sea of the Indian Ocean. It has a total size of 513,120 km^{2} (198,120 mi^{2}) which is the 50th largest in the world. The land area lies between latitudes 5° 37' North and 20° 27' North, and between the longitude 97° 22' East and 105° 37' East. Around 70% of the Gulf of Thailand's coastline is Thai.

Thailand shares a 4,863 km (3,022 mi) long international land boundary with Myanmar, Laos, Cambodia and Malaysia. The nation's axial position influenced many aspects of Thai society and culture. Southern Thailand is the only land route from mainland Asia to Malaysia and Singapore. It has an exclusive economic zone of 305,778 km^{2} (118,062 mi^{2}).

== Composition and geography ==
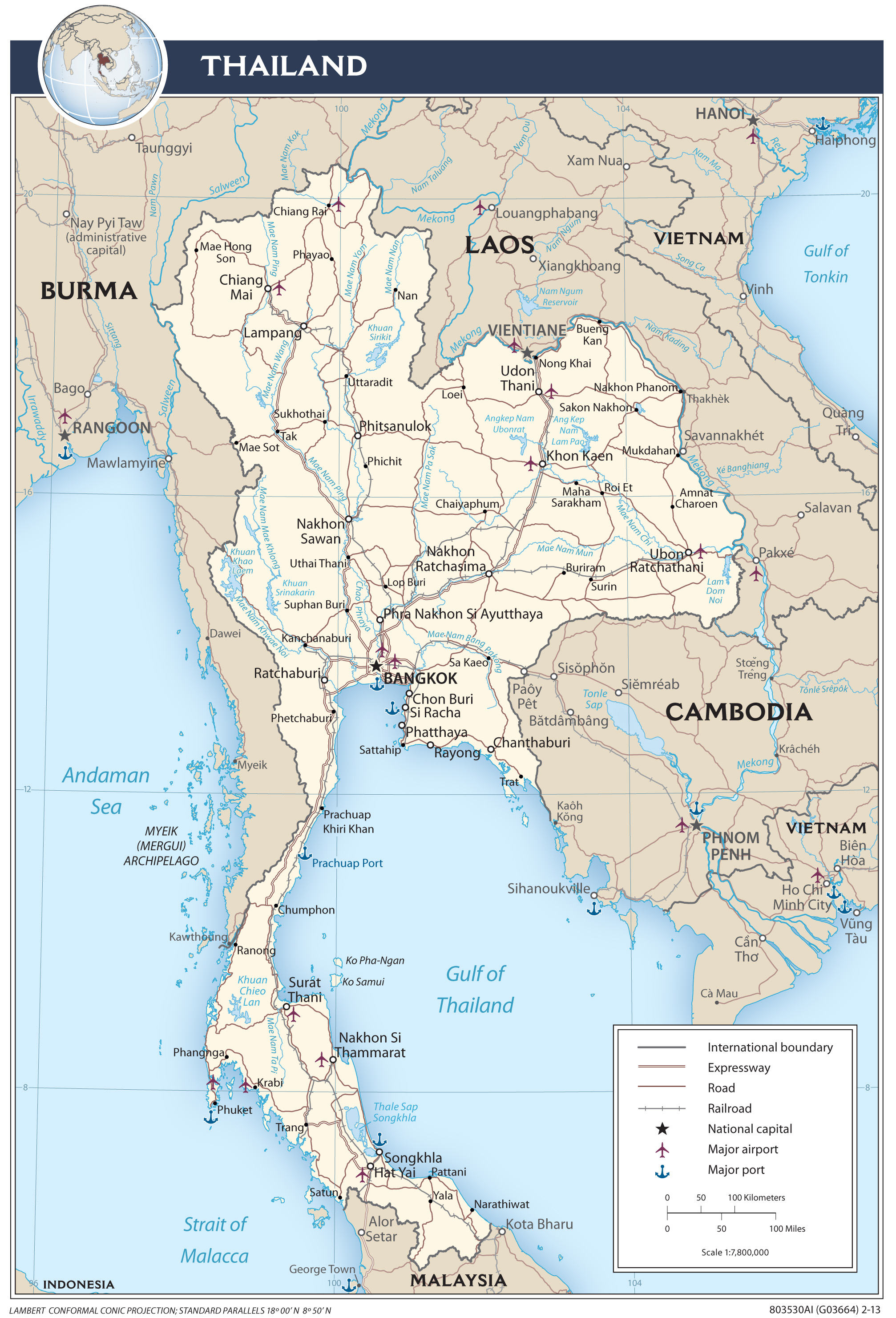
Detailed map of Thailand, by CIA in 2013

=== Location ===
A fertile floodplain and tropical monsoon climate, ideally suited to wet-rice (tham na) cultivation, attracted settlers to this central area in preference to the marginal uplands and the highlands of the northern region or the Khorat Plateau to the northeast. The earliest settlers were in the bronze age such as Ban Chiang around 1500 BCE.

By the 11th century AD, a number of loosely connected rice-growing and trading states flourished in the upper Chao Phraya Basin. They broke free from domination of the Khmer Empire, but from the middle of the 14th century gradually came under the control of the Ayutthaya Kingdom at the southern extremity of the floodplain.

Successive capitals, built at various points along the river, became centers of great Thai kingdoms based on rice cultivation and international commerce. Unlike the neighboring Khmer and Burmese, the Thai continued to look outward across the Gulf of Thailand and the Andaman Sea toward foreign ports of trade.

European colonisation of Southeast Asia brought a new phase of Southeast Asian commerce in the late-1800s. Thailand (then called Siam) was able to maintain its independence as a buffer zone between British-controlled Burma to the west, British Malaya to the south, and French Indochina to the east. However, Thailand lost over 50% of its former territory to the expanding claims of French Indochina until 1907. Its central location made the Kingdom of Thailand's position a regional hub that has greatly influenced its society, culture and history. Southern Thailand has a long, narrow shape. It is the only land connection to Malaysia and Singapore. Thailand is fully above the equator in the Northern Hemisphere.

=== Mountains ===
The mountain ranges that run parallel from north to south across Mainland Southeast Asia are one of Thailand's most distinctive geographical features. The country's highest peak is Doi Inthanon, with an elevation of 2,565 meters. Major mountain ranges include the Thanon Thong Chai Range, the Daen Lao Range on Thailand's northern edge, and the Tenasserim Hills on the border with Myanmar. The average elevation decreases southward. There are no volcanoes. There are 10 mountains over 2,000 m (6,600 ft). 148 mountains exceed 1,000 m (3,300 ft).

Northern Thailand's mountainous regions like Chiang Mai and Doi Inthanon have chilly air and misty mornings. However, at high altitudes it does not get colder than 5 °C to 10 °C due to the tropical climate. There is no snow and frost is rare in the coldest months. In 1955, snow-like frost was reported in Doi Inthanon.

The 10 tallest mountains in Thailand are all located in Northern Thailand. The highest peaks are:

Rank	Name	Thai name	Range	Province	Elevation (m)	Observations
1	Doi Inthanon	ดอยอินทนนท์	Thanon Thong Chai	Chiang Mai	2,565 m (8,415 ft)	Highest point in Thailand. Formerly known as Doi Luang
2	Doi Pha Hom Pok	ดอยผ้าห่มปก	Daen Lao	Chiang Mai	2,285	Donner: 2,296 m; highest peak of the Daen Lao Range on the Thai side of the border
3	Doi Chiang Dao	ดอยหลวง เชียงดาว	Daen Lao	Chiang Mai	2,175	Also known as Doi Luang Chiang Dao. 2,225 m in some sources
4	Khao Kacheu La	เขากะเจอลา		Tak	2,152	
5	Phu Soi Dao	ภูสอยดาว	Luang Prabang Range	Uttaradit	2,120	Highest point of the Luang Prabang Range in Thailand
6	Phu Khe	ภูเข้	Luang Prabang	Nan	2,079	
7	Phu Lo	ภูโล	Luang Prabang	Nan	2,077	Also known as Doi Lo
8	Doi Mae Tho	ดอยแม่โถ	Khun Tan	Chiang Rai	2,031	Highest point of the Khun Tan Range; also known as Doi Lang Ka or Doi Langka Luang
9	Doi Mae Ya	ดอยแม่ยะ		Mae Hong Son	2,005	
10	Doi Phong Sa Yan	ดอยโป่งสะแยน		Mae Hong Son	2,004	

=== Forests ===
The forest cover rate was 63% in the 1940s, but declined to 53.3% in the 1960s and 26.6% in 1991. It had been declining due to timber exports, urbanization, and development. Since the late 1980s, the decline has been halted since protective measures such as banning logging of natural forests were implemented. As of 2020, the Royal Forest Department has classified the country's forests as 31.6% and 38.9% according to the FAO, remaining stable. (Note: During this period, in 2000, the forest area analysis resolution was changed, and the forest rate increased from 25% to 33%.)

The Royal Forest Department classifies the country's forests into six categories: mangrove/coastal forest, evergreen forest, evergreen forest, mixed deciduous forest, deciduous dipterocarp forest, and savanna. Exotic plantations such as eucalyptus and rubber are classified as agricultural land. Of these, mangrove forests and coastal forests are more prevalent in the south and east, mixed deciduous forests in the north, and deciduous dipterocarp forests and savannas in the northeast.

=== Rivers ===
The main rivers are the Chao Phraya River and the Mekong, as well as the Salween River, Mae Klong, Mun River, Chi River, Tha Chin River, and Bang Pakong River. Southern Thailand has short and steep rivers due to the narrow peninsula. The Mekong is partially a natural border between Thailand and Laos for 920 km. It flows from the Golden Triangle in Northern Thailand to Khong Chiam district in Northeastern Thailand.

These are the 10 longest rivers of Thailand:

Rank	River name	Thai name	Province	Region	Length (km)	Tributary of	Refs
1	Mekong	แม่น้ำโขง	Bueng Kan, Chiang Rai, Loei, Nakhon Phanom, Nong Khai, Mukdahan, Ubon Ratchathani	North, Northeast	920 (part in Thailand)	-	
2	Chi River	แม่น้ำชี	Chaiyaphum, Kalasin, Maha Sarakham, Ubon Ratchathani	Northeast	765	Mun River	
3	Nan River	แม่น้ำน่าน	Nakhon Sawan, Nan, Phichit, Phitsanulok, Uttaradit	North, Central	740	Chao Phraya River	
4	Yom River	แม่น้ำยม	Chiang Rai, Nakhon Sawan, Phayao, Phichit, Phitsanulok, Phrae	North, Central	700	Nan River	
5	Ping River	แม่น้ำปิง	Chiang Mai, Kamphaeng Phet, Lamphun, Nakhon Sawan, Tak	North, Central	658	Chao Phraya River	
6	Mun River	แม่น้ำมูล	Buriram, Nakhon Ratchasima, Sisaket, Ubon Ratchathani	Northeast	641	Mekong River	
7	Pa Sak River	แม่น้ำป่าสัก	Ayutthaya, Loei, Lopburi, Phetchabun, Saraburi	Central, Northeast, Northern	513	Chao Phraya River	
8	Wang River	แม่น้ำวัง	Chiang Rai, Lampang, Tak	North	392	Ping River	
9	Khwae Yai River	แม่น้ำแควใหญ่	Kanchanaburi, Tak	West, North	380	Mae Klong	
10	Chao Phraya	แม่น้ำเจ้าพระยา	Ang Thong, Ayutthaya, Chai Nat, Nakhon Sawan, Nonthaburi, Bangkok (special district)	Central, North	372	-	

=== Lakes ===
There are around 8000 natural lakes and swamps. This includes a few large lakes and thousands of small lakes. Songkhla lake is the largest natural lake at 1,040 km^{2} (400 mi^{2}).

These are the 9 largest lakes of Thailand:

Rank	Name	Thai name	Province	Region	Type	Water salinity	Area (km^{2})	Max Depth (m)	Altitude (m)	Volume (km^{3})
1	Songkhla Lake	ทะเลสาบสงขลา	Phatthalung province	Southern Thailand	Natural lake, lagoon lake		1040	5-6	0	1.6
2	Bueng Boraphet	บึงบอระเพ็ด	Nakhon Sawan province	Central Thailand	freshwater swamp and lake		224	4.4	25	
3	Cheow Lan Lake	เชี่ยวหลาน	Surat Thani province	Southern Thailand	artificial lake		185	90	200	
4	Nong Han Lake	หนองหาน	Sakon Nakhon province	Northeastern Thailand	freshwater lake		125.2	10	158	
5	Bueng Khong Long Lake	ทะเลสาบบึงโขงหลง	Bueng Kan	Northeastern Thailand	reservoir lake		22	1	181	
6	Phayao Lake	กว๊านพะเยา	Phayao province	Northern Thailand	freshwater lake		19.8	4	393	
7	Bueng Si Fai	บึงสีไฟ	Phichit Province	Central Thailand	freshwater lake		8.6	2	480	
8	Chiang Saen Lake	ทะเลสาบเชียงแสน	Chiang Rai Province	Northern Thailand	freshwater lake		4.3	4	332.7	
9	Tung Kula Lake	ทะเลสาบทุ่งกุลา	Surin province	Northeastern Thailand	artificial lake, reservoir		1.2	4	129	

=== Waterfalls ===
There are over 50 waterfalls in Thailand. These are the top 10 tallest.

Waterfall	Height	Location	Province	Region	Description	Refs
Mae Surin Falls	100 m (328 ft)	Namtok Mae Surin National Park	Mae Hong Son	Northern Thailand	It consists of one cascade of water plunging from a height of 80 meters over a steep cliff into a ravine below.	
Chat Warin Waterfall		Near Narathiwat town	Narathiwat	Southern Thailand		
Namtok Kaeng Song	10 m (33 ft)	Wang Thong district	Phitsanulok province	Central Thailand	A wide, multi-tiered cascade over dark greenish-yellow rocks with clear pools.	
Namtok Kaeng Sopha	70 m (230 ft)	Thung Salaeng Luang National Park	Phitsanulok Province	Central Thailand	Consists of 3 tiers.	
Erawan Waterfall	Over 70 m (230 ft)	Erawan National Park	Kanchanaburi province	Western Thailand	The source of Khao Phang Waterfall and Sai Yok Noi waterfall. The waterfall is 1500 meters long and has 7 tiers consisting of: ‘Lai Kuen Rang’, ‘Wang Matcha’, ‘Pha Nam Tok’, ‘Oak Phee Sua’ , ‘Bua Mai Long’ , ‘Dong Prueksa’ , and ‘Phu Pha Erawan’.	
Mae Koeng Waterfalls		Wiang ko sai National Park	Lampang and Phrae province	Northern Thailand		
Huai Yang Waterfall		Namtok Huai Yang National Park	Prachuap Khiri Khan province	Western Thailand		
Namtok Khao Soi Dao		Khao Soi Dao Wildlife Sanctuary	Chanthaburi province	Eastern Thailand	16-tiered cascade system. Its source is near the 1,556-meter peak of Khao Soi Dao Nua mountain.	
Nang Rong Waterfall	50 m (164 ft)	Khao Yai National Park	Nakhon Nayok province	Central Thailand	A tiered waterfall. Its main cascade has a height of circa 50 meters.	
Phu Fa waterfall	140 m (459 ft)	Doi Phu Kha National Park	Nan province	Northern Thailand	The waterfall has 12 tiers made of multi level stone cliffs, which resembles giant stairs.	
Namtok Si Dit	26 m (85 ft)	Khao Kho district	Phetchabun province	Northern Thailand	A large single-tiered waterfall on the Wang Thong River.	
Sirindhorn Waterfall		Waeng district	Narathiwat province	Southern Thailand	Sirindhorn Waterfall is not a waterfall that falls from a high cliff, but it's a stream that comes down from a forest at a higher altitude.	
Thi Lo Su Waterfall	250 m (820 ft)	Umphang district	Tak province	Northern Thailand		
Wachirathan Falls	80 m (262 ft)	Chom Thong (in Doi Inthanon National Park)	Chiang Mai	Northern Thailand		
Wang Nok Aen (aka Sakunothayan Waterfall)	10 m (33 ft)	Sakunothayan Botanical Garden	Phitsanulok Province	Central Thailand		
Mae Ya Watefall	260 m (853 ft)	Doi Inthanon National Park	Chiang Mai province	Northern Thailand	Waterfall with 30 tiers.	
Mae Klang Falls		Doi Inthanon National Park	Chiang Mai province	Northern Thailand		
Wachiratan Falls		Doi Inthanon National Park	Chiang Mai province	Northern Thailand		
Siriphum Falls		Doi Inthanon National Park	Chiang Mai province	Northern Thailand		
Tat Mok waterfall	320 m (1,050 ft)	Tat Mok National Park	Phetchabun province	Northern Thailand	Single-tiered waterfall.	

=== Islands ===
There are approximately 1,430 islands. They are relatively small-sized islands and uninhabited islets. Many islands are protected areas in national parks or wildlife sanctuaries. Most islands are near the coasts of Southern Thailand and Eastern Thailand. The largest island is Phuket 543 km^{2} (210 mi^{2}) in the Andaman Sea.

These are the 10 largest islands of Thailand:

Rank	Island name	Thai name	Area (km^{2})	Area (sq mi)	Island group
1	Phuket	ภูเก็ต	543	209.65	
2	Ko Samui	เกาะสมุย	229	88	
3	Ko Chang	เกาะช้าง	211	81	
4	Ko Tarutao	เกาะตะรุเตา	152	58.68	
5	Ko Pha-ngan	เกาะพะงัน	125	48	
6	Ko Kut	เกาะกูด	105	40	
7	Ko Yao Yai	เกาะยาวใหญ่	92	35.5	
8	Ko Phra Thong	เกาะพระทอง	88	33.97	
9	Ko Lanta Yai	เกาะลันตาใหญ่	81	31	
10	Ko Yao Noi	เกาะยาว	36	13.89	

== Topography ==
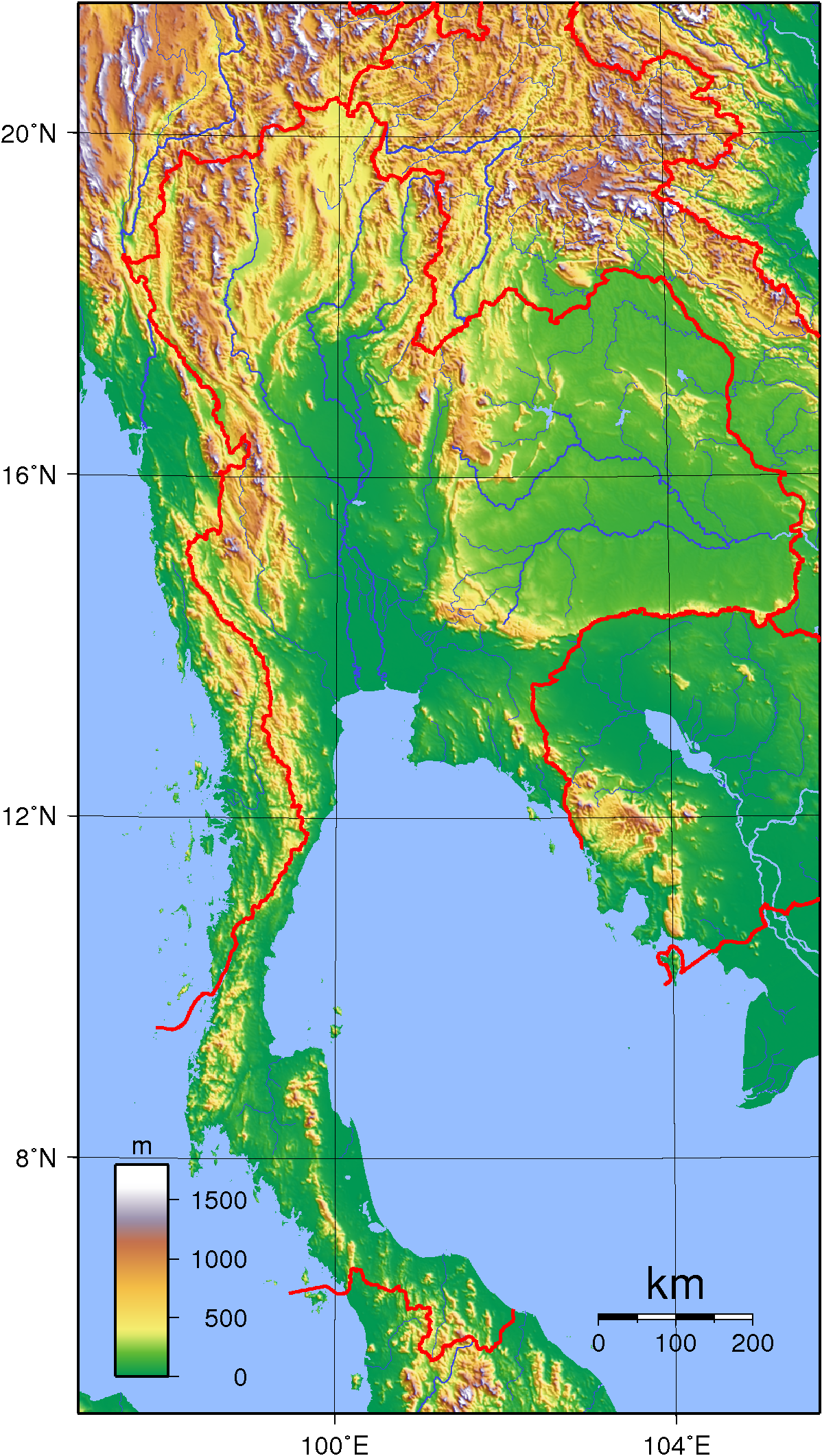
Topographic map of Thailand.

=== Relief ===
The most conspicuous features of Thailand's terrain are high mountains, a central plain, and an upland plateau. Mountains cover much of northern Thailand and extend along the Myanmar border down through the Kra Isthmus and the Malay Peninsula. More than half of Thailand is situated in low-lying alluvial plains. The largest is the Chao Phraya Basin located in the central region of the country along the Chao Phraya river.

From the north, the low-lying areas are bounded by the southern part of the Luang Prabang Range and the highlands of the Phi Pan Nam Range. From the west — ridges Khun Tan Range, Thanon Thong Chai Range and Bilauktaung, have a meridional direction and continuing to the Malay Peninsula. In the northwestern region is the country's highest point of 2,565 m (8,415 ft) at mount Doi Inthanon. The Khorat Plateau is in the Northeastern region (aka Isan). This plateau is separated from the Chao Phraya Basin by the mountain ranges of Phetchabun, Sankamphaeng and Dong Phaya Yen. The plateau gradually rises from the inland border from 150 to 500 meters or more, forming the low mountain ranges Dângrêk, Dong Phaya Yen and Phu Phan. In the southeastern regions are spurs of the Cardamom mountain chain which continues in southwestern Cambodia.

South of the Kra Isthmus, on the Malay Peninsula are plains with small mountains and ridges. The highest point is mount Khao Luang at 1,835 m (6,020 ft). The Thai coastline at the Andaman Sea is very indented with rocks, islands and reefs.

Thailand can be divided into 6 geomorphological regions:

Geomorphological Region	Province	Description
Northern Highlands		It has submeridional oriented high mountain ranges, composed of limestones. Here is the highest point of the country, Doi Inthanon (2565 m). In the east of this area is a large highland Fipannam with average altitudes of 1100—1200 m. To the south, the mountains descend into plains.
Thanon Thong Chai Range		It stretches along the western border with Myanmar.
Central Plain		It occupies a large part of the country, stretches from north to south for 400 km, and from west to east for 200 km. It is composed of alluvial deposits of the rivers Chao Phraya, Bang Pakong and others.
Khorat Plateau		In the northeast, it has an undulating surface with average heights of 185 m, framed by low mountains Dong Phaya Yen in the west, Sankampheng and Dângrêk in the south. The plateau's longitude is 400 km. It is drained by the Mun river in the basin. The Mun is a tributary of the Mekong which borders Thailand and Laos.
Southeastern region		Separated from the rest of the country by the Sankamphaeng Range in the north and by the Bang Pakong River in the west. There is much atmospheric precipitation. Dense humid tropical forests were common there in the past.
Tenasserim Hills		The Tenasserim Hills is a granite mountain range that spans north from Myanmar and Thailand to the south through the Malay Peninsula. The mountains descend to the narrowest area called the Kra Isthmus that connects the Malay Peninsula with the mainland. The Tenasserim coasts are narrow, intermittent in the west and wider in the east. The Phuket Range extends in a meridional direction and separates two coastal plains.

=== Drainage ===
The central plain is a lowland area drained by the Chao Phraya River and its tributaries, the country's principal river system, which feeds into the delta at the head of the Bay of Bangkok. The Chao Phraya system drains about one-third of the nation's territory. In the northeastern part of the country the Khorat Plateau, a region of gently rolling low hills and shallow lakes, drains into the Mekong River via the Mun River. The Mekong system empties into the South China Sea and includes a series of canals and dams.

Together, the Chao Phraya and Mekong systems sustain Thailand's agricultural economy by supporting wet-rice cultivation and providing waterways for the transport of goods and people. In contrast, the distinguishing natural features of peninsular Thailand are long coastlines, offshore islands, and mangrove swamps. A recent global remote sensing analysis suggested that there were 559 km^{2} (216 sq mi) of tidal flats in Thailand, making it the 45th ranked country in terms of tidal flat extent.

=== Shape ===
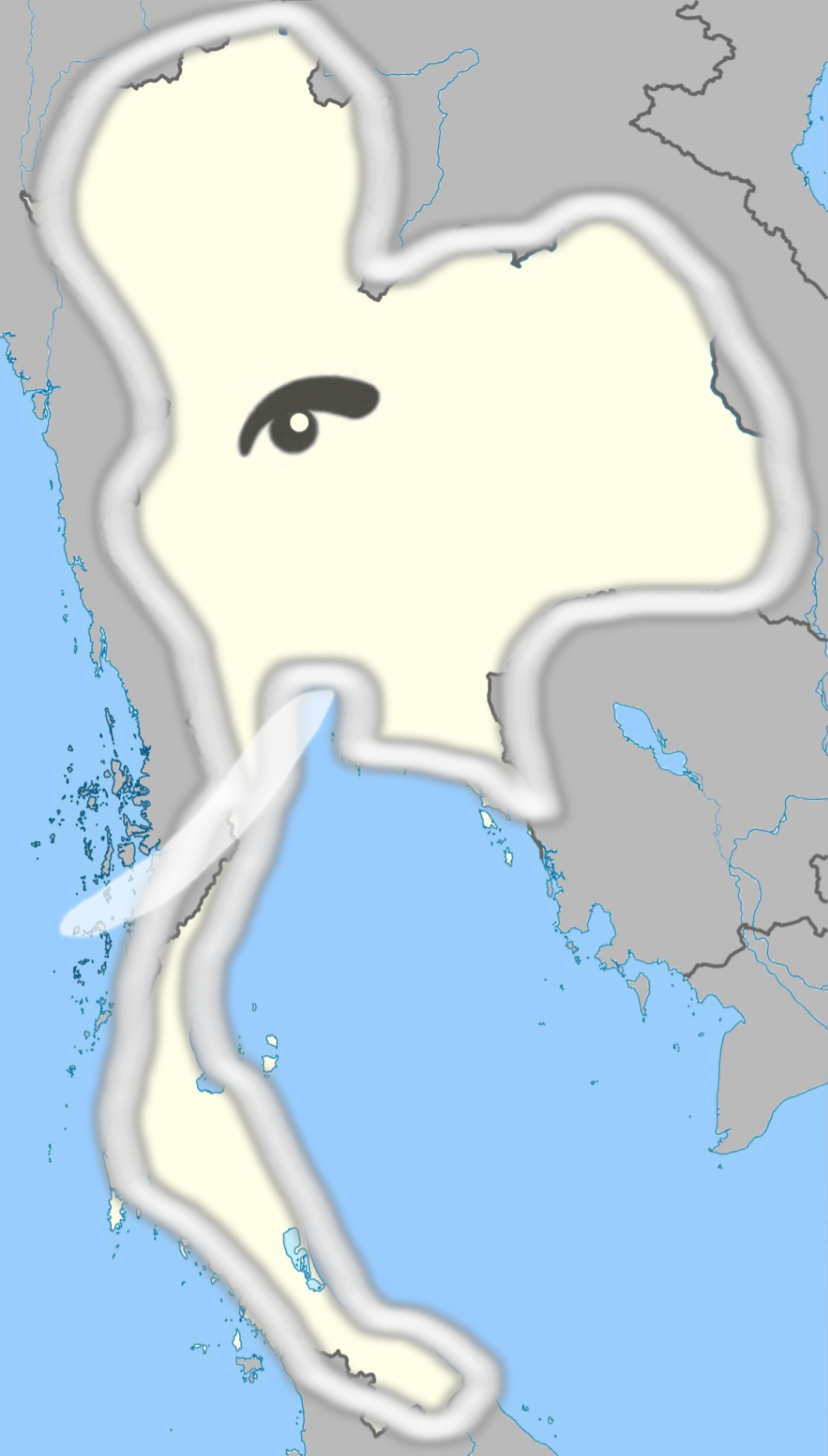
Elephant shape of Thailand geographic map 2025

The geographic shape of Thailand resembles an elephant's head with a long trunk. There are 2 big ears, the Bay of Bangkok is a mouth and Southern Thailand is a long trunk that reaches down the Malay Peninsula. The westside is the front of the head. The elephant holds deep cultural significance and it's a national symbol of Thailand. The elephant also symbolizes Thailand’s natural heritage and fills a vital role in the ecosystems of the region. It's also considered a "golden axe". The broad northern regions are the double-bitted part of the axe like a labrys. The narrow southern “tail” is the handle. The shape changed during the various kingdoms such as Sukhothai, Ayutthaya, and Rattanakosin.

== Geology ==
Present-day Thailand is theorized to have formed during the Triassic period when two continental fragments: Shan-Thai and Cimmeria formed during the breakup of Gondwana. Shan-Thai and Cimmeria collided and merged, eventually moving northward and connecting with Laurasia. Geologically, Thailand is divided into the Western Zone, which belongs to the Shan-Thai terrane; the Northeastern Zone, which belongs to the Indochina Block; and the Central Zone, which is located between the Western and Northeastern Zones.

The northeastern part of Thailand is a relatively stable plateau, with only the Mesozoic, Jurassic and Cretaceous sandstone and shale being uplifted by Tertiary tectonic activity.[30] Most of the rest of the country exhibits a complex geological structure, consisting primarily of Paleozoic limestone and other sedimentary rocks, and Precambrian metamorphic rocks. Late Mesozoic granite is found in the Western Zone, while Paleozoic and Mesozoic neutral or acidic volcanic rocks are abundant in the Central Zone.

Although seismic activity is not particularly high, there are 13 known active faults, mainly in the northwest and central-southwest, and in 2014 the northern part of the country experienced one of the largest earthquakes ever recorded (the 2014 Mae Lao earthquake), measuring 6.3 on the Richter scale.

=== General soil conditions ===
Type	Description	Map
Soils of the alluvial plains and the lower terraces	Regosols on beach and dune sand; Alluvial soils on recent alluvium (fresh water alluvium, B a brackish water alluvium, M a marine alluvium).; Peat and Muck soils; Low - Humic Gley soils on semi-recent and old alluvium; Low - Humic Gley soils and noncalcic Brown soils on semi-recent alluvium; Low- Humic Gley soils and Gray Podzolic soils or Red - Yellow Podzolic soils on old alluvium	General soil conditions of Thailand map, 1967
Soils of the higher terraces and the low plateaus	Gray Podzolic soils on old alluvium; Red - Yellow Podzolic soils on old alluvium; Latosols, mainly on old alluvium, but including Latosols on materials from basalt (Chanthaburi); Grumusols, Rendzinas and related soils on alluvial and residual materials, associated with limestone and basalt; Red- Brown Earths on alluvial and residual materials, associated with limestone; Reddish - brown lateritic soils on materials from intermediate to basic rocks.	General soil conditions of Thailand map, 1967
Soils of the Hills and the mountains	Red - Yellow Podzolic soils; mostly hilly, on materials from acid to intermediate rocks.; Steep Land, intermediate to basic rocks, mainly Red - yellow Podzolic soils and reddish - Brown Lateritic soils; Steep Land, acid to intermediate rocks, mainly red - yellow Podzolic soils; Steep Land, limestone crags and Red - Brown Earths; Lava plateaus and volcanos, shallow undifferentiated soils.	General soil conditions of Thailand map, 1967

=== Main land forms ===
Type	Description	Map
Land forms in transported material	Beach and dune formations; Active and former tidal flats of recent marine and brackish water deposits; Former tidal flats of older brackish water deposits; Flood plains of recent river alluvium; Low alluvial terraces of semi-recent and old alluvium; High alluvial terraces and fans of old alluvium and colluvium	Main landforms of Thailand soil formation map, 1972
Land forms in organic material	Depressions with peat and muck	Main landforms of Thailand soil formation map, 1972
Land forms in residual material	Dissected erosion surfaces and structural plateaux occurring over various rocks.; Lava plateaux and volcano remnants; Limestone outcrops; Hills and mountains	Main landforms of Thailand soil formation map, 1972

=== Soils and surface rocks ===
Type	Description	Map
Soils and surface rocks (estimated conditions in 1949)	1. Bangkok dark heavy clay: profiles not well developed.; 2. Ongkarak clays: marked profile development. Soils very acid.; 3. Thachin clays: saline mangrove swamps and grass lands. Fresh water swamps in the interior.; 4. Kampangsaen loams: medium textured soils with strips of heavier darker soils. Irrigation needed for effective crop production.; 5. Chiengmai loams: recent alluvial soils and some terraces, especially in mountain valleys.; 6. Yom loams and clays: swamps and natural levees between the Yom and Nan rivers in the upper central valley.; 7. Bangkla silt loams: light colored and infertile.; 8. Lopburi clays: calcareous, with marl below. Includes other clays back from the rivers in the upper central valley.; 9. Chaibadan clays: black, shallow and infertile, from igneous rocks.; 10. Chantaburi clays: red, friable, deep , from igneous rocks.; 11. Krabin gravelly loam: red with abundant ferruginous concretions.; 12. Korat fine sandy loams: often with pisolitic laterite in the subsoil. Includes Kumpawapi sandy loams: deeper soils on elevations, without a laterite horizon.; 13. Roi Et fine sandy loams: lower portion of type 5 diked and planted to rice. Most often these areas in type 5 too small to plot on map of this scale.; 14. Gularonghai silt loams: flat grassy plains. Not suited for crop production unless waters controlled and fertilizers applied.; 15. Pattani coastal soils: sandy ridges alternating with strips of low clay rice soils.; 16. Limestone buttes: often precipitous, usually rough topography. Includes some lower, heavy soils from weathering of limestone.; 17. Kuntan sandy loams: shallow and steep, soils from granitic and metamorphic rocks topography hilly to mountainous.; 18. Sritamarat sandy and coarse sandy loams: the footslopes of granitic mountains.; 19. Quartzitic and silicious sandstone hills and the sandy soils from these rocks. Soils usually shallow; at times stony.; 20. Pakchong loams: from shales, slates, conglomerates, limestones, etc. Textures usually much heavier than the soils mapped under type 42.; 21. Rough mountainous land from undifferentiated rocks: Soils usually shallow, steep and stony. Crop production by Kaingining.	Provisional map of soils and surface rocks of Thailand 1949

== Coastline regions ==
The total coastline of Thailand is circa 2,815 km (1,749 mi). This includes 1,878 km (1,167 mi) of the Gulf of Thailand and 937 km (582 mi) of the Andaman Sea coastline. There are 2 main coastlines: the Gulf of Thailand and the Andaman Sea. The Gulf of Thailand has 2 regions: East Coast 544 km (338 mi) and West Coast 1,334 km (829 mi). The Andaman Coast is 937 km (582 mi) long. The gulf is a northern extension of the South China Sea which is part of the Pacific Ocean. The Andaman Sea is a marginal sea of the northeastern Indian Ocean.

Around 80% of the mangrove forests are on the Andaman Coast, the other 20% are along the Gulf of Thailand. Phang Nga province has the biggest mangrove area while Prachuap Khiri Khan has the smallest.

Region	Length	Provinces	Description
East Coast	544 km (338 mi)	Trat, Chantaburi, Rayong, Chonburi, and Chachoengsao, Samut Prakan (part)	This is the east side of the gulf. It has around 470 km^{2} mangrove forests. The annual precipitation is between 660 mm and 850 mm. The mean temperature is 28°C. The relative humidity is 75–85%.
West Coast	1,334 km (829 mi)	Samut Sakon, Samut Songkhram, Bangkok, Petchaburi, Prachuap Khiri Khan, Chumphon, Surat Thani, Nakhon Si Thammarat, Songkhla, Pattani, and Narathiwat.	This is the west side of the gulf. The coastline is about 116 km with a 731 km^{2} of mangrove forest. The climate is quite dry with an annual perception is between 600-850 mm. The mean temperature is between 27-29°C. The relative humidity is about 75–83%.
Andaman Coast	937 km (582 mi)	Ranong, Phuket, Krabi, Trang, and Satun	The Andaman Sea coast is part of the Indian Ocean. The mangrove forest area is around 1917 km^{2}. The mean annual precipitation is about 4 015 mm, the mean annual temperature is 27.5°C, and a relative humidity between 80-85%.
Total	2,815 km (1,749 mi)		

== Gulf of Thailand ==
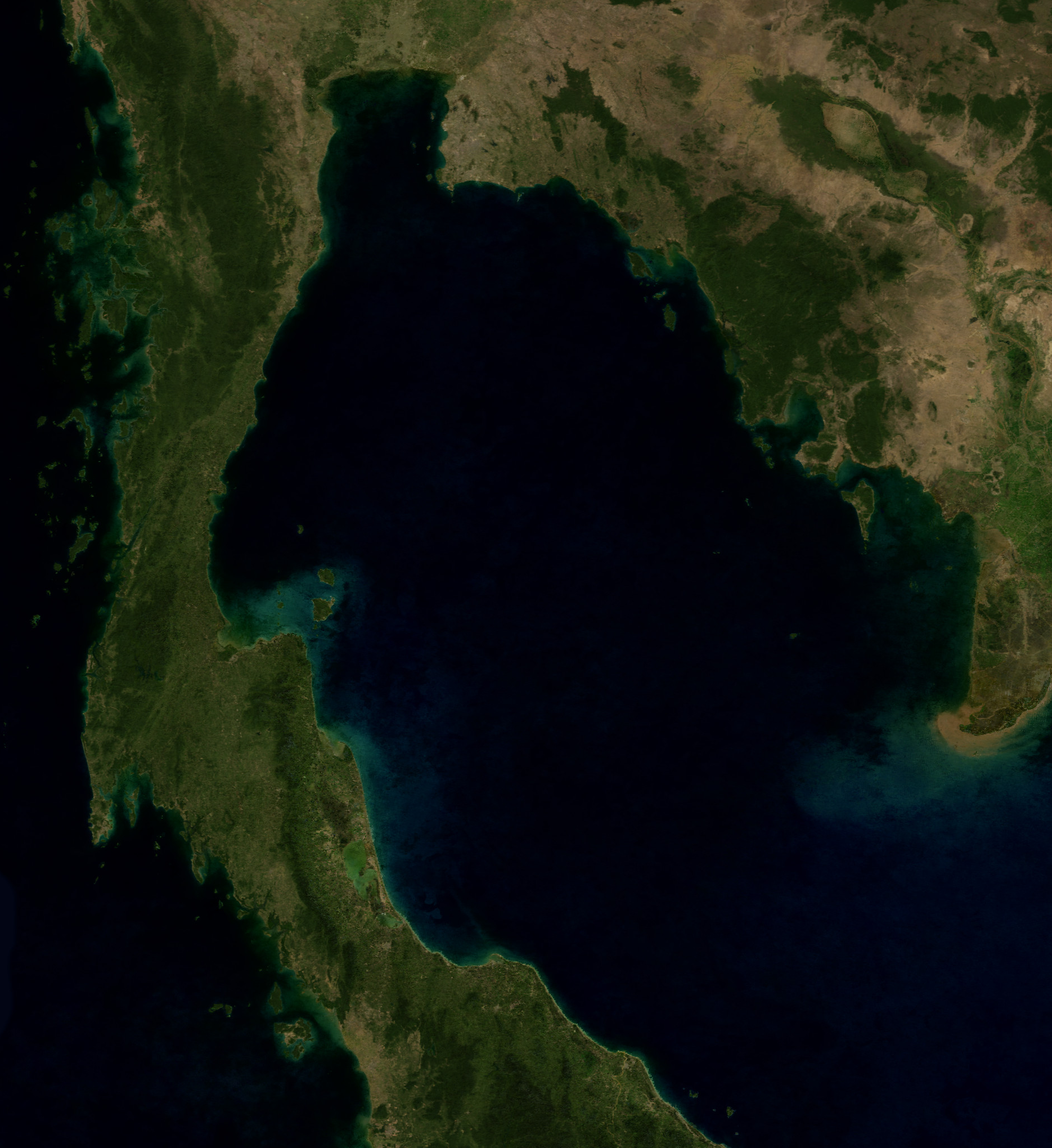
Gulf of Thailand satellite photo January 2004 by NASA

The Gulf of Thailand is a semi-enclosed, continental shelf sea with a surface area of 320,000 km^{2} (120,000 sq mi). The seabed area is 304,000 km^{2} (117,000 sq mi). The mean depth is 58 m (190 ft) and a maximum depth of 85 m (279 ft) in the central basin. The shallowness of the gulf causes a slow water exchange with lower salinity due to major freshwater input from the rivers. It is geographically defined by Thailand which encloses the body of water for 70% of the coastline. The Gulf of Thailand is situated from 6º N to 13º30’ N latitude and 99ºE to 104º E longitudes. It opens to the South China Sea. The southern border of the gulf is between Cape Cà Mau (8°36'N) in Vietnam and the Kelantan River (6°14′N 102°15′E) in Malaysia.

Historical names are the Latin name Sinus Magnus (Great Bay) on the 1486 map Undecima Asie Tabula, and later the Gulf of Siam until the country was renamed to Thailand in 1939.

=== Coastline ===
Around 70% of the gulf's coastline is Thai, 16.5% is Cambodian, 13% is Vietnamese, and 0.67% is Malaysian.

Country	Coastline length	Provinces	Notes
Thailand	1,878 km (1,167 mi)	Chonburi, Rayong, Chanthaburi, Trat, Samut Prakan, Bangkok, Samut Sakhon, Samut Songkhram, Phetchaburi, Prachuap Khiri Khan, Chumphon, Surat Thani, Nakhon Si Thammarat, Songkhla, Pattani, and Narathiwat.	
Cambodia	443 km (275 mi)	Kep, Kampot, Koh Kong, Preah Sihanouk.	
Vietnam	200 km (120 mi) and 154 km (96 mi)	An Giang and Cà Mau (until Cape Cà Mau).	
Malaysia	18 km (11 mi)	Kelantan (from the border with Thailand to the Kelantan River).	
Total	2,693 km (1,673 mi)		

=== Bays ===
The Thai sea territory of the gulf has 5 noteworthy bays:

Bay name	Thai name	Surface area	Country	Description
Bay of Bangkok	อ่าวกรุงเทพ	8,640 km^{2} (3,340 mi^{2})	Thailand	
Prachuap Bay	อ่าวประจวบ		Thailand	
Ao Manao	อ่าวมะนาว		Thailand	
Sattahip Bay	อ่าวสัตหีบ		Thailand	
Bandon Bay	อ่าวบ้านดอน		Thailand	

== Area ==
Thailand is the 50th largest country in the world and the 3rd largest country in Southeast Asia after Indonesia and Myanmar.

Total	Land	Water	Comparative area
513,120 square kilometres (198,120 sq mi).; Country rank in the world: 50th.	Land: 510,890 square kilometres (197,260 sq mi).; Thailand uses a unit of land area called the rai, which is 1,600 m^{2} (0.3954 acres).	Water: 2,230 square kilometres (860 sq mi)	Asia comparative: the size of Japan + South Korea + Taiwan; Africa comparative: the size of Cameroon + Guinea-Bissau; Australia comparative: slightly less than 2/3 the size of New South Wales.; Europe comparative: slightly larger than Spain.; USA comparative: the size of California + Indiana.

=== Boundaries ===
Land boundaries	Coastline	Water
Total: 4,863 km (3,022 mi); Border countries: Myanmar 1,800 km (1,118 mi), Cambodia 803 km (499 mi), Laos 1,754 km (1,090 mi), Malaysia 506 km (314 mi)	Total: 3,219 km (2,000 mi)	Water: 2,230 square kilometres (860 sq mi)

==== Maritime claims ====
Territorial sea	Exclusive economic zone	Continental shelf
12 nmi (22.2 km; 13.8 mi)	EEZ: 305,778 km^{2} (118,062 mi^{2}) and 200 nmi (370.4 km; 230.2 mi)	20 metres (66 ft) depth or to the depth of exploitation

== Extreme points ==
Thailand extends from 5° 37' to 20° 27' north latitude, and from 97° 22' to 105° 37' east longitude. The maximum dimensions are: from the northernmost point in Mae Sai, Mae Sai district to the southernmost Point in Betong district is 1,638.91 km (1,018.37 mi) latitude. From the westernmost point in Mae Khong, Mae Sariang district to the easternmost point in Na Pho Klang, Khong Chiam district is 939.21 km (583.60 mi) longitude.

The narrowest area (longitude) of the Kra Isthmus is 30 km (19 mi). Prachuap Khiri Khan province has the narrowest area of Thailand that borders Myanmar to the west. It is only14.67 km (9.12 mi) longitude from the Gulf of Thailand to the border with Myanmar in the Tenasserim Hills.

The narrowest part of Thailand is merely 0.47 km (0.29 mi) across in Hat Lek, 23110 Khlong Yai, Trat province, that borders Cambodia to the east.

=== Extreme points by compass direction ===
Heading	Location	Province	Bordering entity	Coordinates	Ref
North	Mae Sai, Mae Sai district	Chiang Rai province	Myanmar	20°28′N 99°57′E	
South	Betong district	Yala province	Malaysia	5°37′N 101°8′E	
East	Na Pho Klang, Khong Chiam district	Ubon Ratchathani province	Laos	15°38′N 105°38′E	
West	Mae Khong, Mae Sariang district	Mae Hong Son province	Myanmar	18°34′N 97°21′E	

=== Extreme distances ===
Heading	distance	Location	Province	Bordering entity	Coordinates	Ref
North-South Span (latitude)	1,638.91 km (1,018.37 mi)	Mae Sai, Mae Sai district to Betong district	Chiang Rai province and Yala province	Myanmar, Malaysia		
East-West Span (longitude)	939.21 km (583.60 mi)	Na Pho Klang, Khong Chiam district to Mae Khong, Mae Sariang district	Ubon Ratchathani province and Mae Hong Son province	Cambodia, Myanmar		
Narrowest Part of Thailand	0.47 km (0.29 mi)	Hat Lek, 23110 Khlong Yai	Trat province	Cambodia		

=== Extreme altitudes ===
Extremity	Name	Thai name	Altitude	Province	Coordinates	Ref
Highest	Doi Inthanon	ดอยอินทนนท์	2,565 metres (8,415 ft)	Chiang Mai Province	18°35′32″N 98°29′12″E	
Lowest (man-made)	Boh Yai mine	เหมืองบ่อใหญ่	−106 metres (−348 ft)	Kanchanaburi Province		Abandoned mine, closed in 1997. Surveyed up to -106 m.
Lowest (natural)	Gulf of Thailand	อ่าวไทย	0 metres (0 ft)	Surrounding provinces		

== Regions & provinces ==
Map of the six geographical regions of Thailand

Thailand is a unitary state; the administrative services of the executive branch are divided into three levels by the Law on the Organization of National Government, BE 2534 (1991): central, provincial and local. Thailand's regions are divided into a total of 76 provinces (จังหวัด , changwat) plus Bangkok, which is a special administrative area. These are first-level administrative divisions.

The National Research Council divides Thailand into six geographical regions, based on natural features including landforms and drainage, as well as human cultural patterns. They are:

- North
- Northeast
- Central
- East
- West
- South

Although Bangkok geographically is part of the central plain, as the capital and largest city this metropolitan area may be considered in other respects a separate region.

Each of the six geographical regions differs from the others in population, basic resources, natural features, and level of social and economic development. The diversity of the regions is in fact the most pronounced attribute of Thailand's physical setting.

Name	Thai name	Area total	Provinces	Description	Image
Northern Thailand	ภาคเหนือ	96,077 km^{2}	Northern Thailand provinces list: Chiang Mai Province; Lamphun Province; Lampang Province; Uttaradit Province; Phrae Province; Nan Province; Phayao Province; Chiang Rai Province; Mae Hong Son Province	Northern Thailand is a mountainous area. Parallel mountain ranges extend from the Daen Lao Range (ทิวเขาแดนลาว), in the southern region of the Shan Hills, in a north-south direction, the Dawna Range (ทิวเขาดอยมอนกุจู) forming the western border of Thailand between Mae Hong Son and the Salween River, the Thanon Thong Chai Range (เทือกเขาถนนธงชัย), the Khun Tan Range (ดอยขุนตาน), the Phi Pan Nam Range (ทิวเขาผีปันน้ำ), as well as the western part of the Luang Prabang Range (ทิวเขาหลวงพระบาง). These high mountains are incised by steep river valleys and upland areas that border the central plain. Most rivers, including the Nan, Ping, Wang, and Yom, unite in the lowlands of the lower-north region and the upper-central region. The Ping River and the Nan River unite to form the Chao Phraya River. The northeastern part is drained by rivers flowing into the Mekong basin, like the Kok and Ing. The Thi Lo Su Waterfall in Tak province is claimed to be the tallest and highest waterfall in Thailand. Traditionally, these natural features made possible several different types of agriculture, including wet-rice farming in the valleys and shifting cultivation in the uplands. The forested mountains also promoted a spirit of regional independence. Forests, including stands of teak and other economically useful hardwoods that once dominated the north and parts of the northeast, had diminished by the 1980s to 130,000 km^{2}. In 1961 they covered 56% of the country, but by the mid-1980s forestland had been reduced to less than 30% of Thailand's total area.	Northern Thailand
Northeastern Thailand	ภาคตะวันออกเฉียงเหนือ	167,718 km^{2}	Northeastern Thailand provinces list: Kalasin province; Khon Kaen province; Chaiyaphum province; Nakhon Phanom province; Nakhon Ratchasima province; Bueng Kan province; Buriram province; Maha Sarakham province; Mukdahan province; Roi Et province; Yasothon province; Loei province; Sisaket province; Sakon Nakhon province; Surin province; Nong Khai province; Nongbua Lamphu province; Amnat Charoen province; Udon Thani province; Ubon Ratchathani province	The northeast (aka Isan), with its poor soils, is not favoured agriculturally. However, sticky rice, the staple food of the region, which requires flooded, poorly drained paddy fields, thrives and where fields can be flooded from nearby streams, rivers and ponds, often two harvests are possible each year. Cash crops such as sugar cane and manioc are cultivated on a vast scale, and to a lesser extent, rubber. Silk production is an important cottage industry and contributes significantly to the economy. The region consists mainly of the dry Khorat Plateau which in some parts is extremely flat, and a few low but rugged and rocky hills, the Phu Phan Mountains. The short monsoon season brings heavy flooding in the river valleys. Unlike the more fertile areas of Thailand, the northeast has a long dry season, and much of the land is covered by sparse grasses. Mountains ring the plateau on the west and the south, and the Mekong delineates much of the northern and eastern rim. Some varieties of traditional medicinal herbs, particularly of the Genus Curcuma, family Zingiberaceae, are indigenous to the region.	Northeastern Thailand
Central Thailand	ภาคกลาง	91,798.64 km^{2}	Central Thailand provinces list: Bangkok; Nakhon Pathom province; Nonthaburi province; Pathum Thani province; Samut Prakan province; Samut Sakhon province; Samut Songkhram province; Kamphaeng Phet province; Nakhon Sawan province; Phetchabun province; Phichit province; Phitsanulok province; Sukhothai province; Uthai Thani province; Ang Thong province; Phra Nakhon Si Ayutthaya province; Chai Nat province; Lopburi province; Nakhon Nayok province; Saraburi province; Sing Buri province; Suphanburi province	The "heartland", central Thailand, is the natural, self-contained Chao Phraya Basin often termed "the rice bowl of Asia". The complex irrigation system developed for wet-rice agriculture in this region provided the necessary economic support to sustain the development of the Thai state from the 13th century Sukhothai Kingdom to contemporary Bangkok. Here the rather flat unchanging landscape facilitated inland water and road transport. The fertile area was able to sustain a dense population, 422 people per square kilometre in 1987, compared with an average of 98 for the country as a whole. The terrain of the region is dominated by the Chao Phraya and its tributaries and by the cultivated paddy fields. Metropolitan Bangkok, the focal point of trade, transport, and industrial activity, is on the southern edge of the region at the head of the Gulf of Thailand and includes part of the Chao Phraya delta.	Central Thailand
Eastern Thailand	ภาคตะวันออก	34,481 km^{2}	Eastern Thailand provinces list: Chachoengsao province; Chanthaburi province; Chonburi province; Prachinburi province; Rayong province; Sa Kaeo province; Trat province	Eastern Thailand lies between the Sankamphaeng Range, which forms the border of the northeastern plateau to the north, and the Gulf of Thailand to the south. The western end of the Cardamom Mountains, known in Thailand as Thio Khao Banthat, extends into eastern Thailand. The geography of the region is characterised by short mountain ranges alternating with small basins of short rivers which drain into the Gulf of Thailand. Fruit is a major component of agriculture in the area, and tourism plays a strong part in the economy. The region's coastal location has helped promote the Eastern Seaboard industrial development, a major factor in the economy of the region.	Eastern Thailand
Western Thailand	ภาคตะวันตก	53,769 km^{2}	Western Thailand provinces list: Kanchanaburi Province; Phetchaburi Province; Prachuap Khiri Khan Province; Ratchaburi Province; Tak Province	Thailand's long mountainous border with Myanmar continues south from the north into western Thailand with the Tenasserim Hills, known in Thailand as Thio Khao Tanaosi (เทือกเขาตะนาวศรี). The geography of the western region of Thailand, like the north, is characterised by high mountains and steep river valleys. Western Thailand hosts much of Thailand's less-disturbed forest areas. Water and minerals are also important natural resources. The region is home to many of the country's major dams, and mining is an important industry in the area.	Western Thailand
Southern Thailand	ภาคใต้	73,848 km^{2}	Southern Thailand provinces list: Chumphon Province; Krabi Province; Nakhon Si Thammarat Province; Narathiwat Province; Pattani Province; Phang Nga Province; Phatthalung Province; Phuket Province; Ranong Province; Satun Province; Songkhla Province; Surat Thani Province; Trang Province; Yala Province	Southern Thailand, part of a narrow peninsula, is distinctive in climate, terrain, and resources. Its economy is based on tourism, and palm oil and rubber plantations. In Krabi Province, for example, palm plantations occupy 980,000 rai (1,568 km^{2}), or 52% of the province's farmland. Other sources of income include coconut plantations, tin mining. Rolling and mountainous terrain and the absence of large rivers are conspicuous features of the south. North-south mountain barriers and impenetrable tropical forest caused the early isolation and separate political development of this region. The Songkhla Lake is the largest natural lake in Thailand. International access through the Andaman Sea and the Gulf of Thailand made the south a crossroads for both Theravada Buddhism, centered at Nakhon Si Thammarat, and Islam, especially in the former Pattani Kingdom on the border with Malaysia.	Southern Thailand

== Climate ==
Thailand map of Köppen climate classification zones

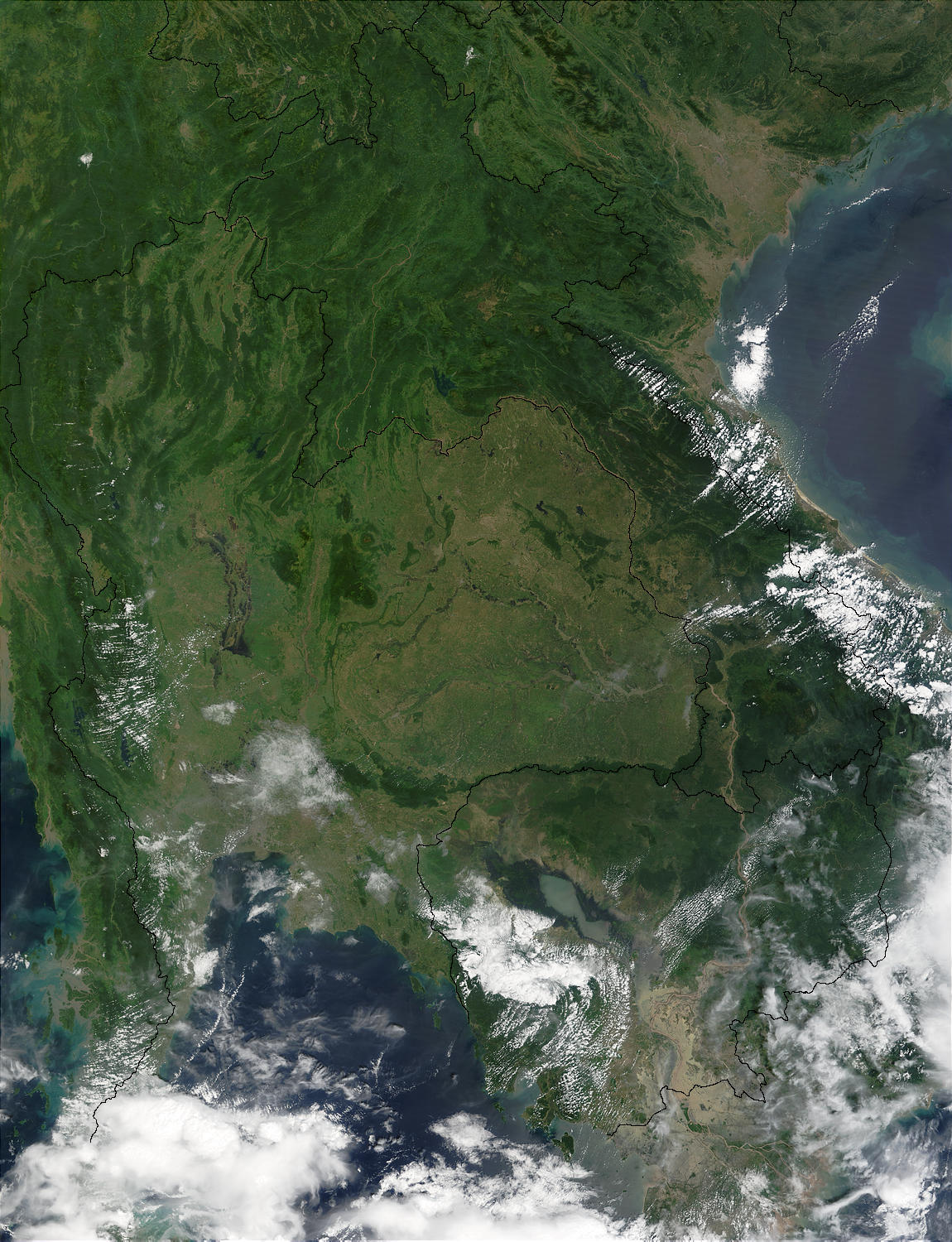
Seasonal flooding in Thailand and Cambodia.

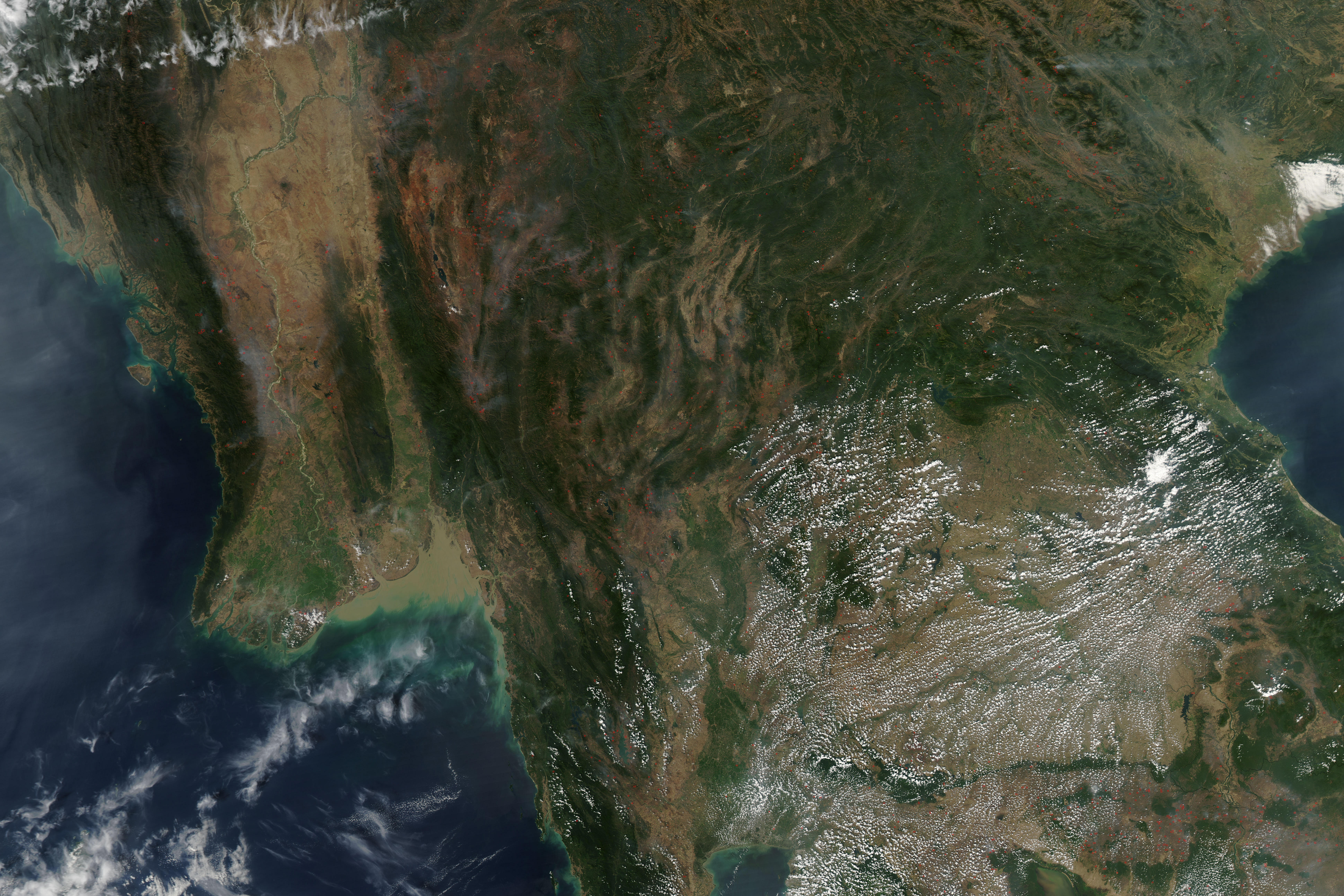
Fires burning across the hills and valleys of Myanmar Thailand, Laos, and Vietnam (labeled with red dots).

Thailand's climate is influenced by seasonal monsoon winds (the southwest and northeast monsoons).

Most of Thailand has a "tropical wet and dry or savanna climate" type (Köppen's Tropical savanna climate). The majority of the south as well as the extreme east have a tropical monsoon climate. Parts of the south also have a tropical rainforest climate.

=== Seasons ===
Thailand has three seasons: summer, rainy, and winter.

Season name	Thai name	Month	Description
Summer	ฤดูร้อน	Mid-February until mid-May	The summer season (aka pre–monsoon) runs from mid-February until mid-May and brings warmer weather.
Rainy	ฤดูฝน	mid-May to mid-October	The rainy season (aka southwest monsoon) is mid-May to mid-October and prevails over most of the country. Moist air moves from the Indian Ocean to Thailand, causing abundant rain over most of the country. August and September are the wettest period of the year. This can occasionally lead to floods. In addition to rainfall caused by the southwest monsoon, the Intertropical Convergence Zone (ITCZ) and tropical cyclones also contribute to producing heavy rainfall during the rainy season. Dry spells commonly occur for one to two weeks from June to early-July. This is due to the northward movement of the ITCZ to southern China.
Winter	ฤดูหนาว	mid-October to Mid-February	The winter season (aka northeast monsoon) is active from mid-October till mid-February. It brings cold and dry air from China over most of Thailand. In southern Thailand, the northeast monsoon brings mild weather and abundant rainfall on the eastern coast of that region. However most of Thailand experiences dry weather and mild temperatures during this season. An exception is the southern part of Thailand which receives abundant rainfall, particularly during October to November.

Due to their inland location and latitude, the north, northeast, central, and eastern parts of Thailand experience a long period of warm weather. During the hottest time of the year (March to May), temperatures usually reach up to 30 °C (86 °F) or more, with the exception of coastal areas where sea breezes moderate afternoon temperatures. In some areas (particularly the north and northeast) close to or below 0 °C (32 °F). Southern Thailand has mild weather year-round, with less diurnal and seasonal variations in temperatures, due to maritime influences.

Most of the country receives a mean annual rainfall of 1,200 to 1,600 mm (47 to 63 in). However, certain areas on the windward sides of mountains such as Ranong Province on the west coast of southern Thailand and eastern parts of Trat Province receive more than 4,500 mm (180 in) of rainfall per year. The driest areas are the leeward sides of the central valleys and the northernmost portion of south Thailand, where mean annual rainfall is less than 1,200 mm (47 in).

Most of Thailand (north, northeast, central, and east) has dry weather during the northeast monsoon and abundant rainfall during the southwest monsoon. In the southern parts of Thailand, abundant rainfall occurs in both the northeast and southwest monsoon seasons, with a peak in September for the western coast and a peak in November–January on the eastern coast.

=== Northern vs southern climate ===
The tropical savanna climate in Northern Thailand vs the tropical monsoon climate in Southern Thailand has notable differences. The average temperature in Phuket (Southern Thailand) is warmer than Chiang Mai (Northern Thailand) year-round. However, Phuket has more rainy days and rainfall per month than Chiang Mai.

Weather in Thailand
Month		J	F	M	A	M	J	J	A	S	O	N	D
Chiang Mai	Max Temp Av.	29	32	34	36	34	32	31	31	31	31	30	28
Chiang Mai	Min Temp Av.	13	14	17	22	23	23	23	23	23	21	19	15
Chiang Mai	hours/day	9	10	9	9	8	6	5	4	6	7	8	9
Chiang Mai	mm/month	7	11	15	50	140	155	190	220	290	125	40	10
Chiang Mai	days/months	1	1	2	5	12	16	18	21	18	10	4	1
Phuket	Max Temp Av.	31	32	33	33	31	31	31	31	30	31	31	31
Phuket	Min Temp Av.	23	23	24	25	25	25	25	24	24	24	24	24
Phuket	hours/day	9	9	9	8	6	6	6	6	5	6	7	8
Phuket	mm/month	35	40	75	125	295	265	215	246	325	315	195	80
Phuket	days/months	4	3	6	15	19	19	17	17	19	19	14	8
Reference: "Saisons et climats 2003" Hachette ISBN 2012437990

=== Bangkok ===
The capital Bangkok has a tropical savanna climate (Aw) as per the Köppen climate classification. The Asian monsoon system influences the city's three seasons: summer (hot), rainy, and winter (cool). The winter is rarely below 23 °C (41 °F): circa 23.2 °C (73.8 °F) in December to 35.7 °C (96.3 °F) in April. The annual average temperature is 28.9 °C (84.0 °F).

The summer begins in mid-February and it's usually dry with occasional storms. The rainy season is caused by the southwest monsoon around mid-May. September is the wettest month with around 335.9 millimetres (13.22 in) rainfall. The cool northeast monsoon causes the winter season from mid-October till mid-February.

Bangkok's urban heat island causes a temperature increase of 2.5 °C (4.5 °F) during daytime and 8.0 °C (14 °F) at night. Bangkok metropolis' highest temperature was 41.0 °C (105.8 °F) on 7 May 2023. and the lowest 9.9 °C (49.8 °F) in January 1955.

Climate data for Bangkok Metropolis (1991–2020, extremes 1951–present)
Month	Jan	Feb	Mar	Apr	May	Jun	Jul	Aug	Sep	Oct	Nov	Dec	Year
Record high °C (°F)	37.6 (99.7)	38.8 (101.8)	40.1 (104.2)	40.0 (104.0)	41.0 (105.8)	38.8 (101.8)	38.4 (101.1)	38.2 (100.8)	37.4 (99.3)	37.9 (100.2)	38.8 (101.8)	37.1 (98.8)	41.0 (105.8)
Mean daily maximum °C (°F)	32.7 (90.9)	33.7 (92.7)	34.7 (94.5)	35.7 (96.3)	35.1 (95.2)	34.1 (93.4)	33.5 (92.3)	33.3 (91.9)	33.2 (91.8)	33.3 (91.9)	33.1 (91.6)	32.3 (90.1)	33.7 (92.7)
Daily mean °C (°F)	27.4 (81.3)	28.6 (83.5)	29.7 (85.5)	30.7 (87.3)	30.3 (86.5)	29.7 (85.5)	29.2 (84.6)	29.2 (84.6)	28.6 (83.5)	28.4 (83.1)	28.4 (83.1)	27.3 (81.1)	28.9 (84.0)
Mean daily minimum °C (°F)	23.4 (74.1)	24.8 (76.6)	26.4 (79.5)	27.2 (81.0)	26.9 (80.4)	26.4 (79.5)	26.1 (79.0)	25.9 (78.6)	25.4 (77.7)	25.2 (77.4)	24.7 (76.5)	23.2 (73.8)	25.4 (77.7)
Record low °C (°F)	9.9 (49.8)	14.9 (58.8)	13.7 (56.7)	19.9 (67.8)	21.1 (70.0)	21.1 (70.0)	21.9 (71.4)	21.2 (70.2)	21.3 (70.3)	18.3 (64.9)	14.2 (57.6)	10.5 (50.9)	9.9 (49.8)
Average precipitation mm (inches)	23.6 (0.93)	21.4 (0.84)	51.0 (2.01)	93.3 (3.67)	216.8 (8.54)	198.5 (7.81)	189.7 (7.47)	227.1 (8.94)	335.9 (13.22)	288.7 (11.37)	44.6 (1.76)	11.6 (0.46)	1,702.1 (67.01)
Average precipitation days (≥ 1.0 mm)	1.9	1.9	3.4	5.4	12.4	13.4	14.1	15.6	18.0	14.4	3.8	1.0	105.3
Average relative humidity (%)	67.9	70.5	72.6	72.0	74.4	75.2	75.5	76.4	79.3	78.0	68.8	65.6	73.0
Average dew point °C (°F)	20.4 (68.7)	22.2 (72.0)	23.9 (75.0)	24.8 (76.6)	24.9 (76.8)	24.6 (76.3)	24.2 (75.6)	24.2 (75.6)	24.4 (75.9)	23.9 (75.0)	21.7 (71.1)	19.2 (66.6)	23.2 (73.8)
Mean monthly sunshine hours	216.0	215.8	234.2	226.6	196.2	158.4	140.7	128.9	129.6	157.5	194.8	213.5	2,212.2
Average ultraviolet index	10	12	12	12	12	12	12	12	12	11	10	9	11
Source 1: NOAA, Thai Meteorological Department (Feb–May record highs, 1951–2022; Nov–Feb record lows, 1951–2021), CNN (May record high), Ogimet (other record highs/lows)
Source 2: Weather Atlas (UV), Meteo Climat (record)

== National parks ==
There are currently 102 national parks in Thailand, including 21 marine national parks. National parks are under the direction of the Department of National Parks, Wildlife and Plant Conservation (DNP), which is an agency of the Ministry of Natural Resources and Environment (MNRE).

Khao Yai National Park is the first national park of Thailand and the 3rd largest national park in the country. It is situated in Nakhon Ratchasima and has an area of around 2,166 km^{2} (836 sq mi). This park was established in 1961 after the adoption of the National Park Act B.E. 2504 (1961). This Thai legislation authorizes the government to designate, protect, and manage natural areas for public education and amenity. In 1993, the administration of national parks was divided into two departments: land, and marine parks. The first Thai marine park is Khao Sam Roy Yot which was created in 1966. It covers It covers 98 km^{2} (38 sq mi), and is located in Prachuap Khiri Khan Province.

=== Biggest parks ===
The five biggest national parks by area are:

Name	Province	Area (km^{2})	Notes
Kaeng Krachan National Park	Phetchaburi and Prachuap Khiri Khan	2,915 km^{2} (1,125 mi^{2})	11-tier Pala-U waterfall, birdwatching, and wild elephants.
Thap Lan National Park	Prachinburi and Nakhon Ratchasima	2,236 km^{2} (863 mi^{2})	Scenic mountain views of the Sankamphaeng Range.
Khao Yai National Park	Nakhon Ratchasima	2,166 km^{2} (836 mi^{2})	First national park of Thailand and a UNESCO World Heritage Site with wildlife and waterfalls.
Si Phang Nga National Park	Phang Nga Province	246 km^{2} (95 mi^{2})	Multiple waterfalls and lush jungle
Kaeng Tana National Park	Ubon Ratchathani Province	80 km^{2} (31 mi^{2})	Rocky river landscape at the Mun River.

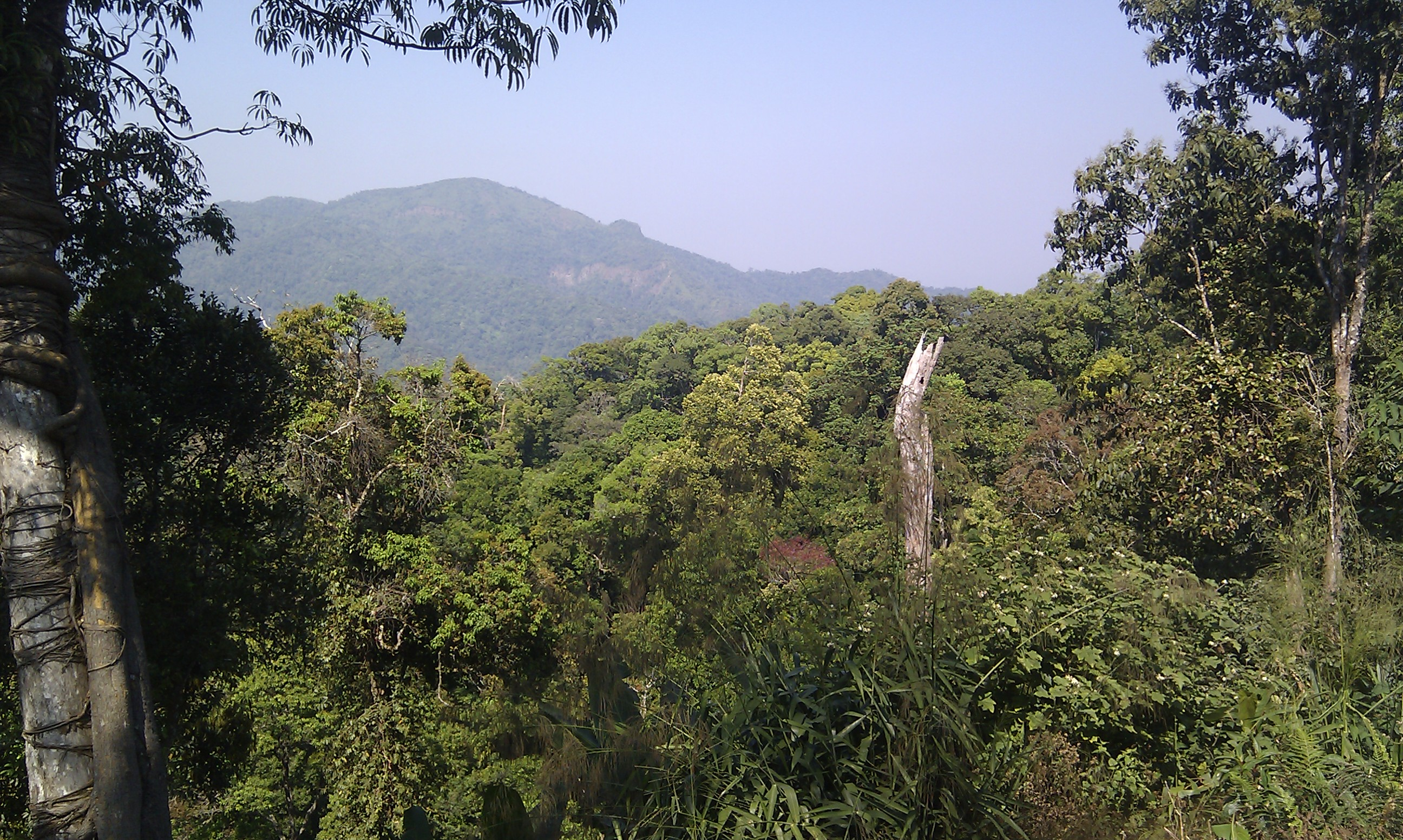
Jungle and mountain in Kaeng Krachan

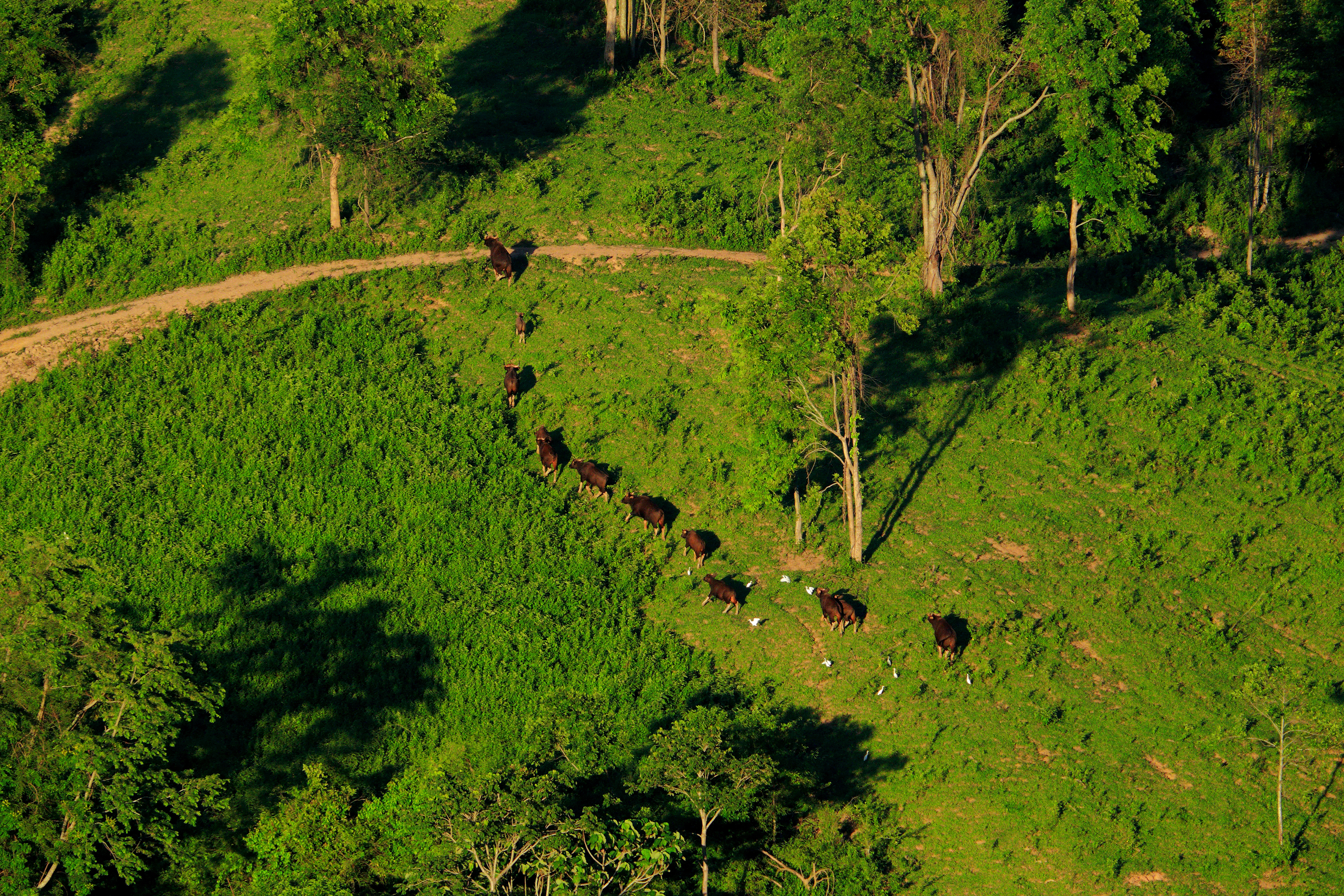
A herd of wild buffalo in Thap Lan

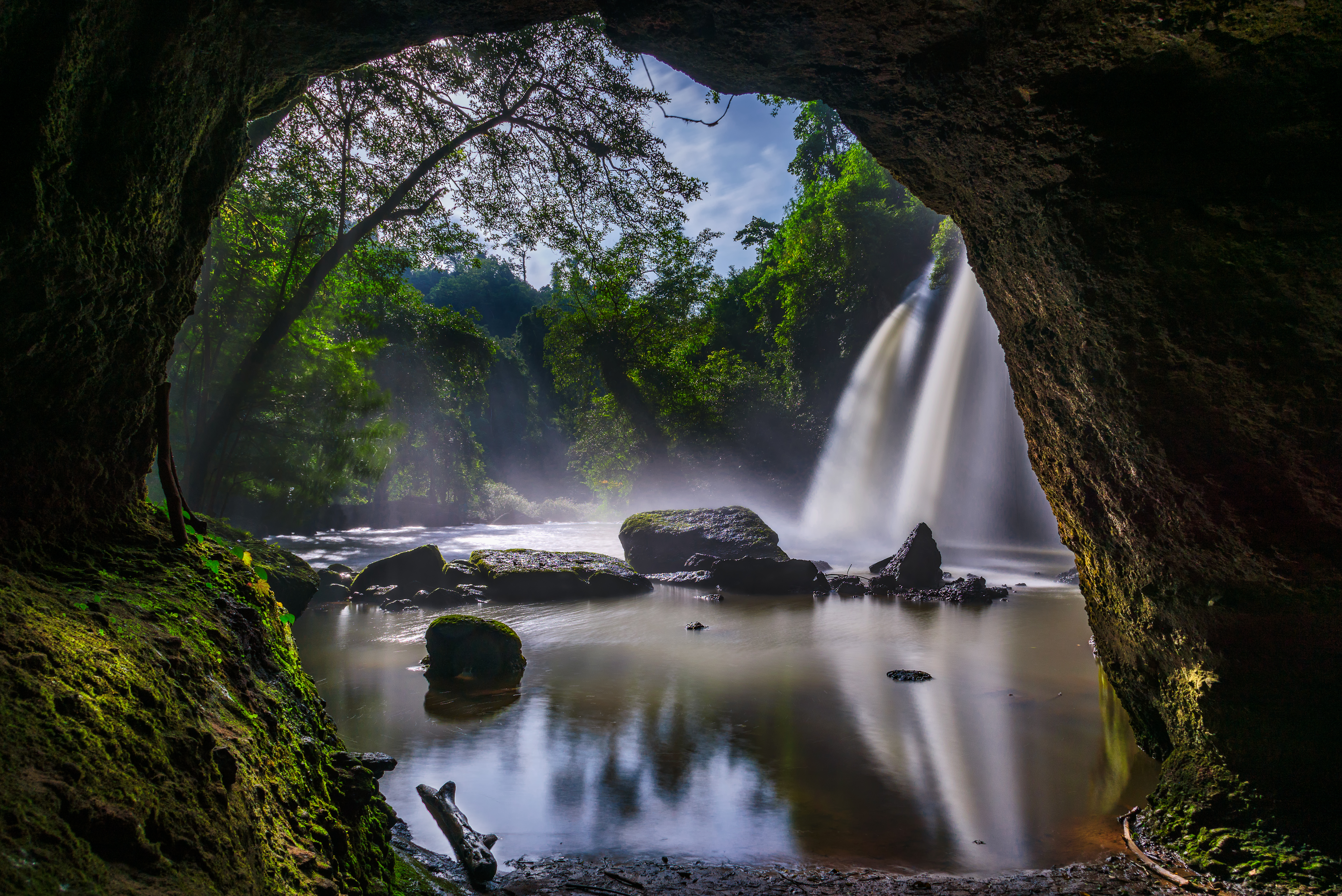
Haew Suwat waterfall in Khao Yai

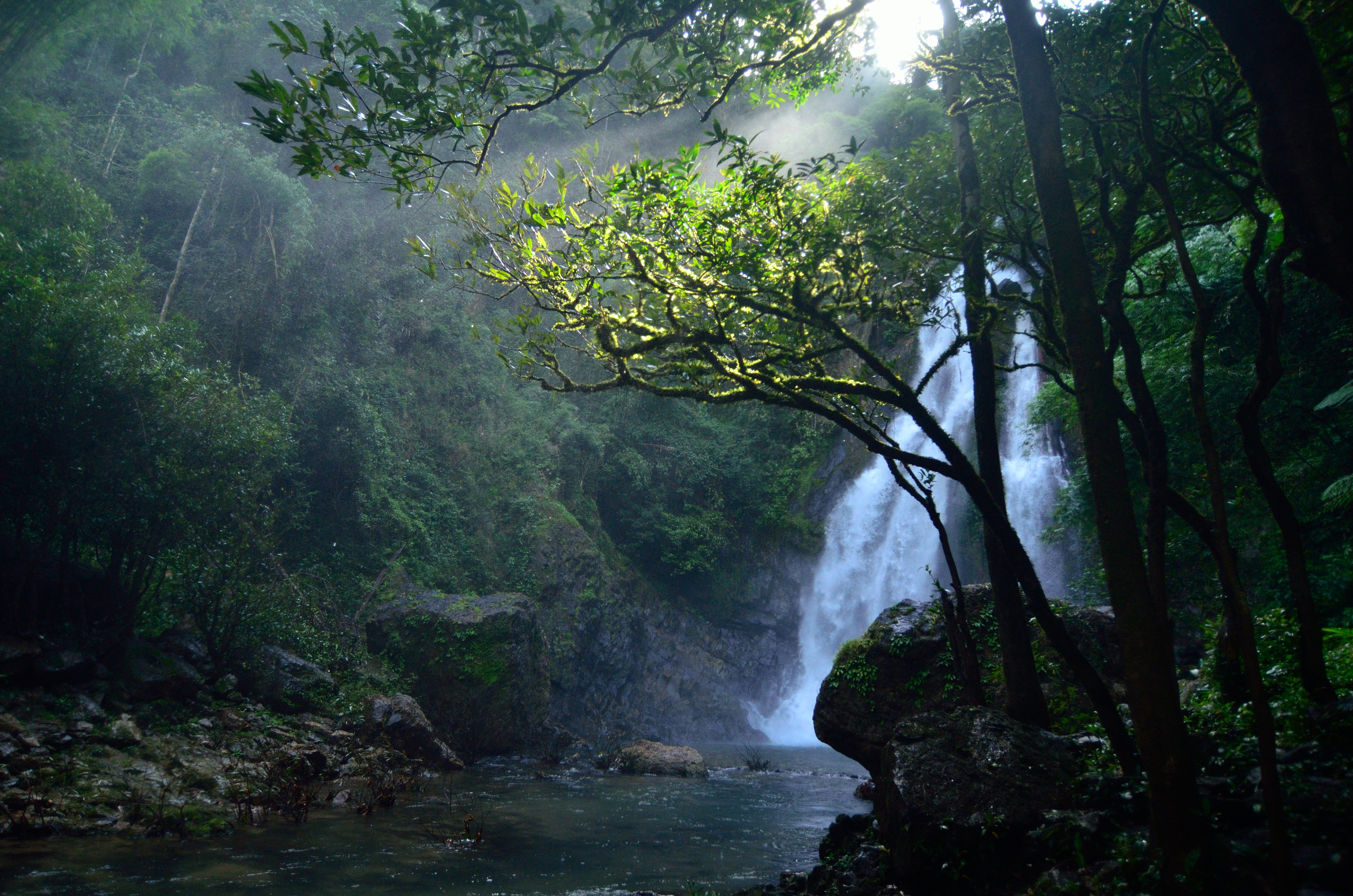
Waterfall in Si Phang Nga

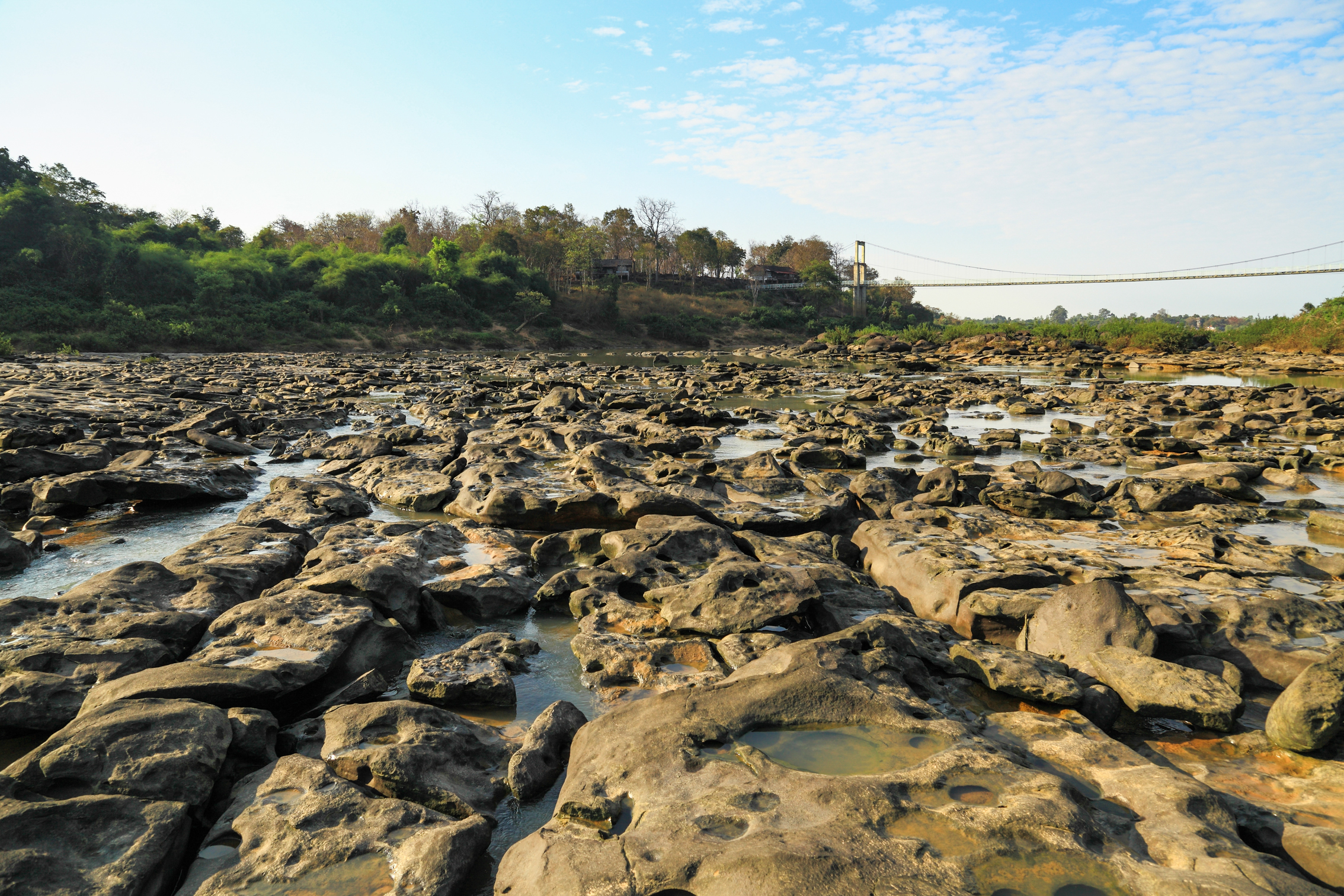
Rocky riverside at Kaeng Tana National Park

=== Zoos ===
Khao Kheow Open Zoo in Chonburi is the second largest zoo in Asia. It is approximately 1,976 acres (800 ha) and has over 8,000 animals and 300 species.

== Human geography ==
Largest cities by urban population in Thailand onedptgis.dpt.go.th/onedpt-complain-ppl/ www.bora.dopa.go.th
Rank	Name	Province	Pop.
1	Bangkok	Bangkok	10,539,000
2	Chiang Mai	Chiang Mai	1,198,000
3	Nakhon Ratchasima	Nakhon Ratchasima	466,098
4	Khon Kaen	Khon Kaen	412,758
5	Hat Yai	Songhkla	404,044
6	Udon Thani	Udon Thani	400,581
7	Chonburi	Chonburi	342,959
8	Pattaya	Chonburi	328,961
9	Si Racha	Chonburi	327,172
10	Phitsanulok	Phitsanulok	281,929

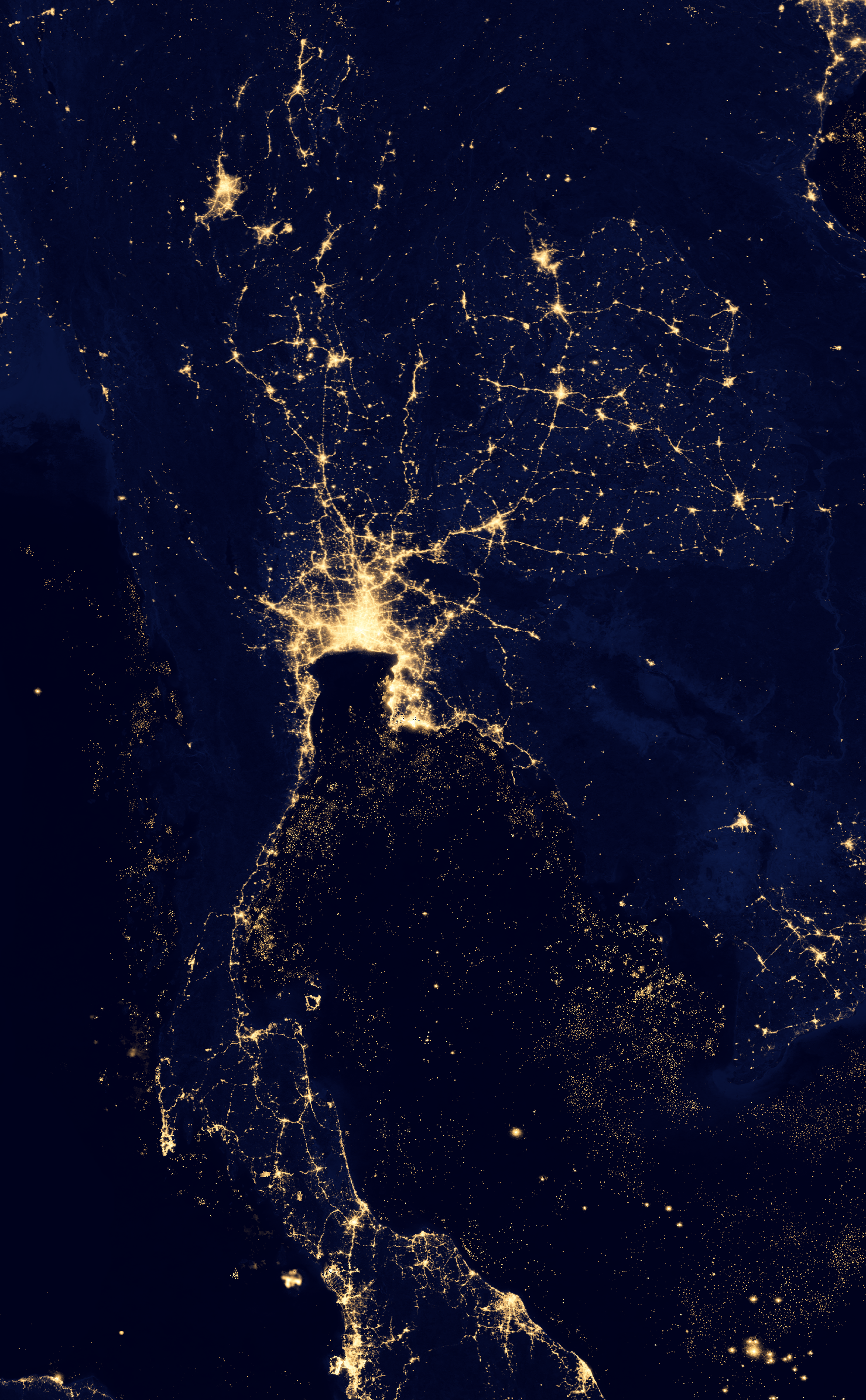
Thailand at night in 2012, satellite photo by VIIRS

=== Demographics ===
Thailand is the 23rd most populous country in the world with 65,826,149 people in November 2025.

Bangkok has the largest metropolitan population of circa 18,180,000 (2025). It is the economic and political capital of Thailand.

== Natural resources ==
=== Land resources ===
- Tin, rubber, natural gas, tungsten, tantalum, timber, lead, fish, gypsum, lignite, fluorite, arable land.

==== Land use ====
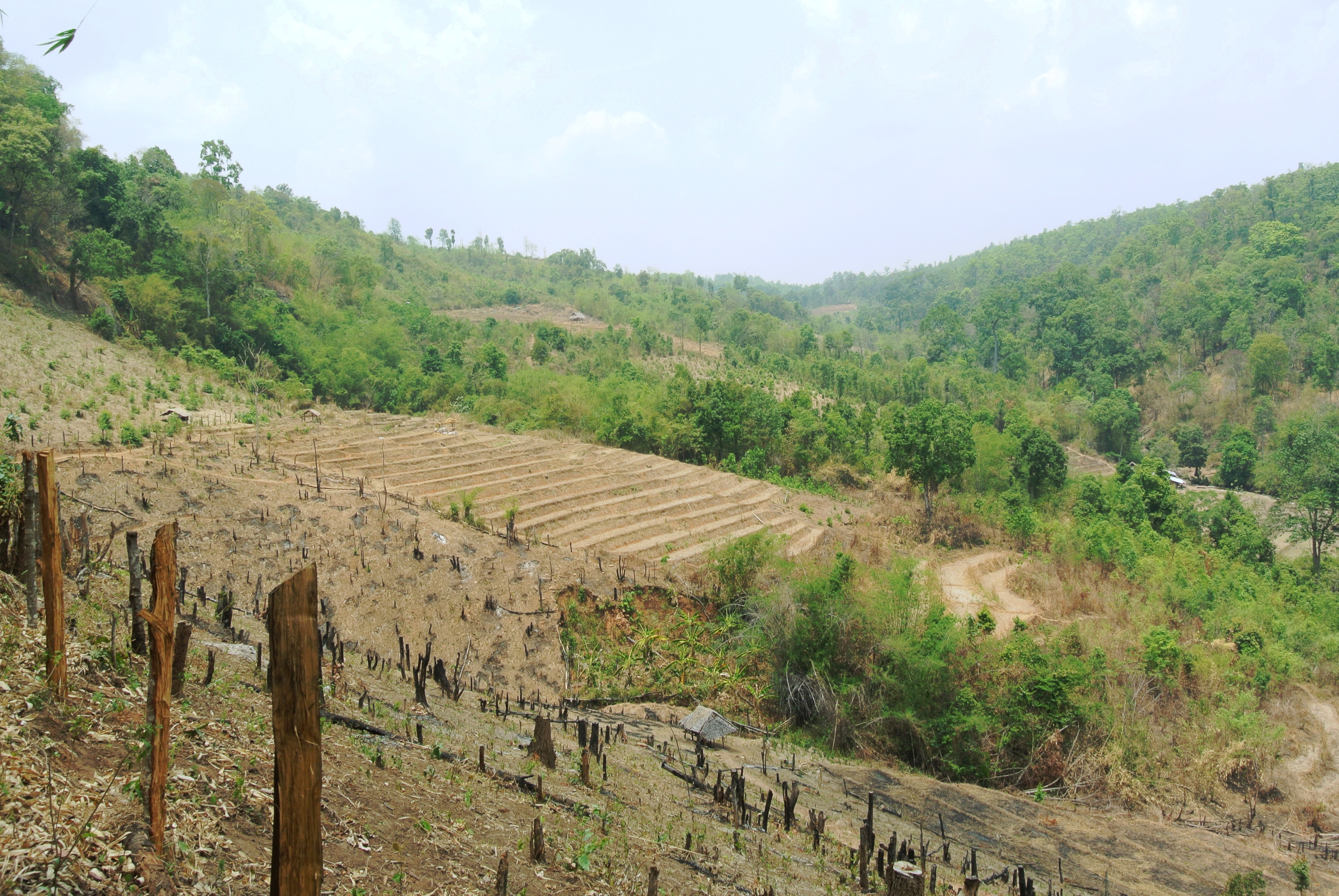
Karen tribe in northern Thailand: controlled burn in the foreground and agricultural terraces.

In 2022, circa 46% is agricultural land. 38.8% is forest. The remaining 15.2% is divided by residential, water (surface, rivers, waterways), roads and wilderness. The exact stats are unavailable.

Land use type	Area	Description
Forest	38.8% (2022 est.); 199,090.56 km^{2} (76,869.29 sq mi)	
Agricultural land	46% (2022 est.); 236,035.2 km^{2} (91,133.7 sq mi)	Arable land: 33.6% (2022 est.); Permanent crops: 10.9% (2022 est.); Permanent pasture: 1.6% (2022 est.)
Residential area	?	
Water surface, rivers, waterways	?	
Roads	?	
Wilderness	?	
Other	15.2% (2022 est.); 77,994.24 km^{2} (30,113.74 sq mi)	

==== Land ownership ====
Pattamawadee Pochanukul, a lecturer from the Faculty of Economics at Thammasat University, estimates that about 59% of all arable land in Thailand belongs to the state. As of 30 September 2015 the Treasury Department owned 176,467 plots of land, consisting of about 9.9 million rai (15,769.6 km^{2}). The Ministry of Defence owns about 2.6 million rai (4,230 km^{2}) or about 21.2% of total public land. Information from the Office of the National Anti-Corruption Commission (NACC) shows that members of the house of representatives in 2013 owned a total of 35,786 rai of land (about 57.3 km^{2}).

==== Irrigated land ====
- Total: 64,150 km^{2} (24,770 mi^{2}) (2012)

=== Marine resources ===
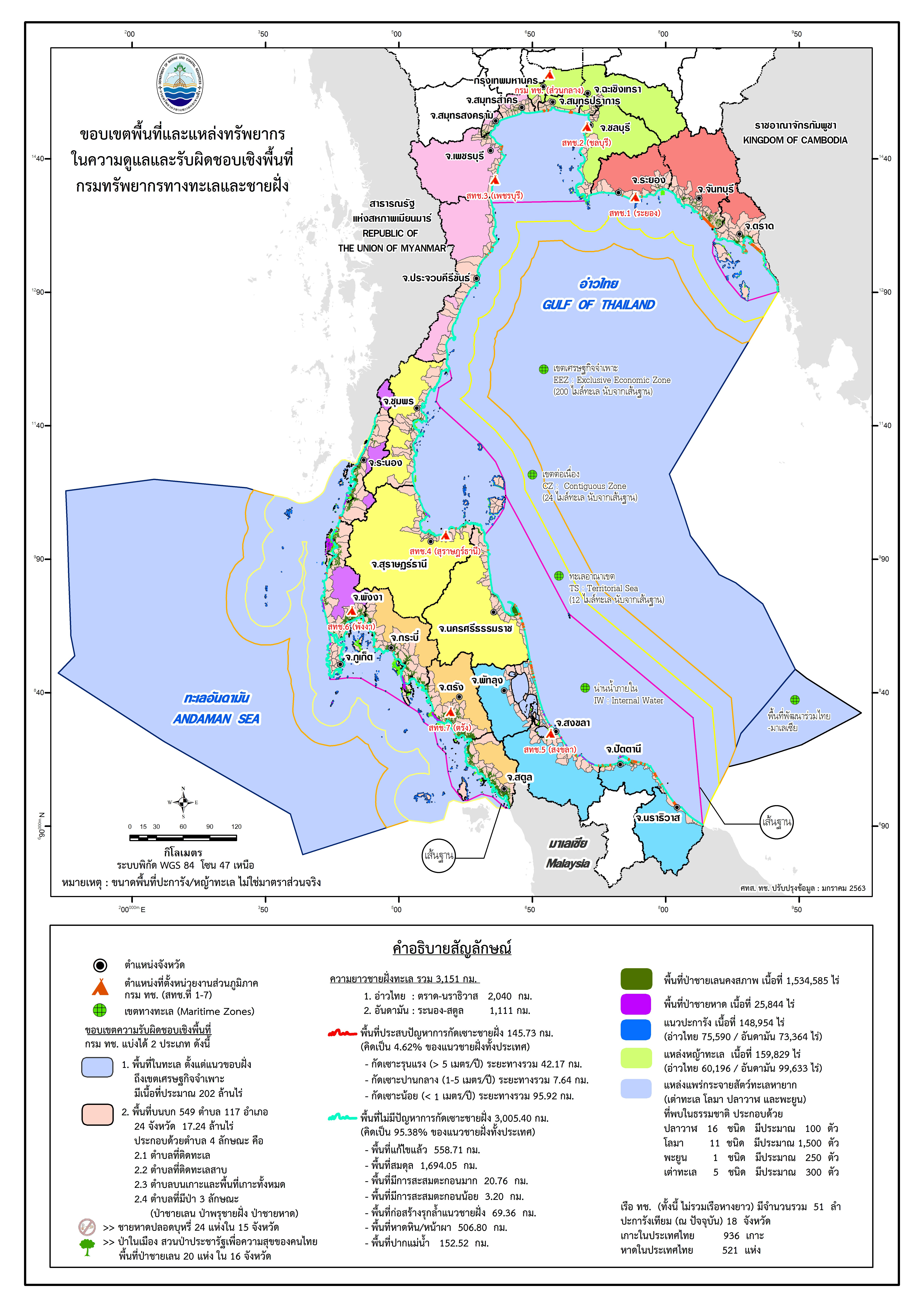
Exclusive economic zone of Thailand and resources 2020

Thailand has the world's 64th largest exclusive economic zone (EEZ), with an area of 305,778 km^{2} (118,062 mi^{2}). It claims an EEZ of 200 nmi (370.4 km; 230.2 mi) from its shores, which has long coastlines with the Andaman Sea and Strait of Malacca to the west and the Gulf of Thailand to the east, although all of its EEZ is limited by maritime boundaries with neighboring countries. Circa 3/4th of the coastline around the Gulf of Thailand is part of Thailand.

==== Inland fishery ====
Over 150 fish species have been identified in catches from inland waters. 20 of these are economically important. The most common fish is the carp (represented by Puntius gonionotus, Puntioplites proctosyzron, Cirrhinus jullieni, Osteocheilus hasselti, Labiobarbus lineatus, Morulius chrysophekadion etc). The favorite fish of Thai people are 2 species of Snakehead (fish) called Channa striata and Channa micropeltes. The main catfish species are Clarias batrachus, C. microcephalus, Pangasius sutchi, P. larnooudii, P. siamensis, Kryptopterus pogon and Ompok bimaculatus. Corcia siamensis is the only representative of the clupeidae family.

Inland fishery resources of Thailand
Resource	Number	Area (ha)
Rivers and canals	47	120000
Natural lakes and swamps	8000	300000
Large reservoirs	21	292590
Medium and small reservoirs	1745	425500
Village ponds	4947	25676
Brackish water lakes	1	96000
Other public waters	10859	143000
Total		1285420
Source: modified from Pawaputanon, 1992

==== Total renewable water resources ====
- Total: 438.61 billion cubic meters (2022 est.)

=== Energy ===
In 2014, 75% of Thailand's electricity production was fueled by natural gas. Coal-fired power plants produced an additional 20% of the electricity, with the remainder coming from biomass, hydropower, and biogas.

Thailand produces about a third of the oil it consumes. It is the second-largest oil importer in Southeast Asia. Thailand is a major producer of natural gas, with reserves of at least 3 trillion cubic meters. After Indonesia, it is the largest coal producer in Southeast Asia, but it needs to import more coal to meet domestic demand.

== Biota ==
=== Flora ===
The phytochorion belongs to the Paleotropical kingdom. It is estimated that approximately 1,900 genus and 10,000 species of vascular plants inhabit the region, of which about 10% are considered endemic. Santisuk et al. (2006) lists a total of 1,407 species distributed in Thailand, including 921 species of dicotyledonous plants, 417 species of monocotyledonous plants, 42 species of ferns, and 27 species of gymnosperms.

Major tree species include those of the Dipterocarpaceae family and teak, as well as species from the Diospyros genus, Artocarpus genus, Lagerstroemia genus, and in mangrove forests, species from the Rhizophoraceae and Meliaceae families.

=== Fauna ===
The biogeographic realm is part of the Indomalayan realm, spanning the Indochina and Sunda subrealms.[70] According to ONEP (2007), there are 302 recorded mammal species, 982 bird species, 350 reptile species, 137 amphibian species, and 2,820 fish species (720 freshwater fish species). The conservation status of 1,196 of these species was assessed in 2005, and 116 mammal species, 180 bird species, 32 reptile species, 5 amphibian species, and 215 fish species were listed as threatened. Circa 264 mammal species in Thailand are on the IUCN Red List.

The elephant is a representative animal, and white elephants are considered symbols of kingship, have been featured on the national flag, and are considered to be the incarnation of Buddha in Buddhism, which is practiced by the majority of the population. At the beginning of the 20th century, there were approximately 100,000 elephants in captivity, but as of 2023, the wild population had declined to approximately 2,250 and the captive population to approximately 2,400. The central government has taken measures to protect elephants, such as opening conservation facilities and dedicated hospitals. See also elephants in Thailand. Water buffalo and bulls were also used as working animals, but by the 1980s, due to the diversification of transportation methods, they were rarely used as working animals.

=== Notable species native to Thailand ===
These are notable flora and fauna that live in their natural habitats of Thailand.

Actinopterygii	Aves	Bovidae	Canidae	Cetaceans
Mekong giant catfish	Green Peafowl	Banteng	Thai Bangkaew Dog (from Phitsanulok province)	Bryde's whale (This is the most common whale in the Gulf of Thailand. These are a protected species in Thailand since 2019.)
Siamese fighting fish (National aquatic animal.)	White-rumped Shama	Gaur	Thai Ridgeback (from Chanthaburi and Trat province)	Indo-Pacific humpback dolphin
Oarfish (Nicknamed Nāga by Thais for resembling the mythological serpent. Inhabits the Gulf of Thailand and Andaman Sea. Occasionally caught or washes ashore.)	Siamese fireback (National bird.)	Wild water buffalo	Dhole	Orca
Siamese algae-eater	Great hornbill	Mainland serow	Golden jackal	Irrawaddy dolphin
Blacktip reef sharks	White-bellied sea eagle	Chinese goral		Humpback dolphin
Whale sharks	Black-and-yellow broadbill	Zebu. There are 4 native types: Khaolumpoon (north), Isaan (northeast), Lan (central), chon (south).		Finless porpoise
Garra waensis	Malayan banded pitta			Omura's whale
Chitala lopis	Helmeted hornbill			False killer whale
	Blue-rumped parrot			Humpback whale
	Thai Game			Blue whale

Cervidae	Colubridae	Dugongidae	Elephantidae & Equidae	Felidae
Muntjac	Reticulated python	Dugong	Indian elephant (A subspecies of the Asian Elephant. It is herbivorous and lives in forests. National animal of Thailand.)	Indochinese tiger
Fea's muntjac	Burmese python		Thai Pony (aka Thai Country Bred)	Malayan tiger
Sambar deer	King cobra			Clouded leopard
Indian hog deer	Monocled cobra			Asian golden cat
Greater mouse-deer	Calloselasma			Siamese cat
Eld's deer (endangered, rare in Western Thailand)	Banded krait			Korat
	Rainbow water snake			Khao Manee
	Chrysopelea ornata			Suphalak
	Dryophiops rubescens			Indochinese leopard
				Jungle cat
				Leopard cat
				Fishing cat
				Flat-headed cat (endangered in Southern Thailand)

Flora	Herpestidae	Lepidoptera	Leporidae	Manidae	Portunidae	Prionodontidae
Cassia fistula (National tree and National flower.)	Javan mongoose	Danaus genutia	Burmese hare	Sunda pangolin	Portunus pelagicus	Banded linsang
Nelumbo nucifera (lotus, Dok Bua, symbol of purity and Buddhism)	Crab-eating Mongoose	Junonia almana		Chinese pangolin	Mud crab	Spotted linsang
Heliconia		Junonia orithya				
Crinum asiaticum		Parthenos sylvia				
Hoya (plant)		Oleander Hawkmoth				
Orchid (numerous species)		Ariadne ariadne				
Rafflesia		Pachliopta aristolochiae				
Dipterocarpaceae (evergreen or deciduous)		Attacus atlas				
Teak (tree)						
Ficus religiosa (โพ or "Pho" tree)						

Primates	Reptilia	Rhinolophidae	Rodentia	Tapiridae	Ursidae	Viverridae
Lar gibbon	Asiatic softshell turtle	Thai horseshoe bat	Asiatic brush-tailed porcupine	Malayan tapir	Asian black bear (subspecies: Indochinese black bear, Tibetan black bear)	Binturong
Robinson's banded langur	Siamese crocodile (The species is critically endangered and extirpated from many regions.)	Thailand horseshoe bat	Malayan porcupine		Sun bear (subspecies: Malayan sun bear)	Large-spotted civet
Indochinese grey langur	Siamese leaf-toed gecko	Croslet horseshoe bat				Asian palm civet
Bengal slow loris	Asian water monitor	Big-eared horseshoe bat				Large Indian civet
Crab-eating macaque	Oriental garden lizard	Intermediate horseshoe bat				Masked palm civet
Southern pig-tailed macaque	Calotes mystaceus					Banded Palm Civet
Stump-tailed macaque	Eutropis multifasciata					Small Indian civet
Dusky leaf monkey	Dopasia					Small-toothed palm civet
Rhesus macaque	Hawksbill sea turtle					Otter civet (endangered)
Assam macaque	Tokay gecko					
Sunda slow loris	Asian giant softshell turtle					
Northern pig-tailed macaque						
Southern pig-tailed macaque						
Germain's langur						
White-thighed surili						
Pileated gibbon						
Agile gibbon						
Siamang (in Southern Thailiand)						

== Environmental issues ==
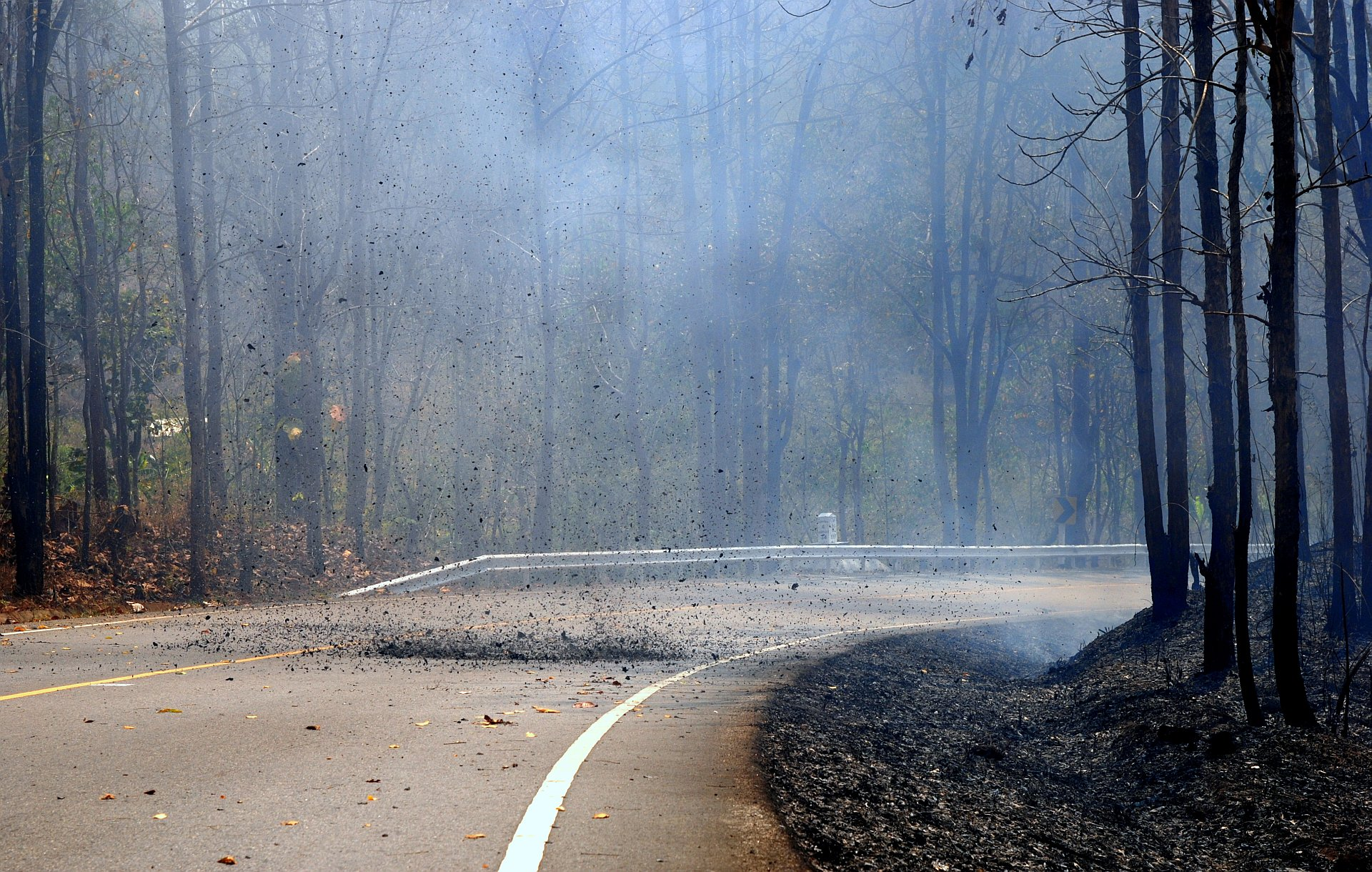
Wind-blown smoke and ash from a forest fire along the Mae Sariang–Khun Yuam road in Mae Hong Son province, 2010.

=== Environmental concerns ===
- Natural hazards: Land subsidence in Bangkok, resulting from the depletion of the water table; droughts (see also 2004 Indian Ocean earthquake and 2011 Thai floods). Thailand is highly exposed to the effects of climate change such as the rising sea levels and extreme weather events.
- Drought: Droughts are a persistent feature of Thailand's climate. Droughts appear to be worsening according to the Thai Meteorological Department. and drought hazard mapping.
- Air pollution
- Water pollution from organic and industry wastes
- Deforestation
- Soil erosion
- Wildlife populations threatened by illegal hunting

=== Agriculture impact ===
The unpredictability of precipitation, temperature changes and many other harmful events will intensify in the future. This means that Thailand will have to face droughts in the middle of the rainy season, which will result in damage to young plants and flooding of rice fields. It is therefore imperative for Thailand to adapt as quickly as possible to these changes to protect its population on the one hand and, if it wishes, to maintain a monopoly on the export of rice and not suffer significant losses. Which would ultimately have a huge impact on the country's economy. Particularly with the fluctuation in the price of rice, due to uncertainties, which prevents farmers from increasing their income.

=== International environmental agreements ===
- Party to: biodiversity, climate change, climate change-Kyoto Protocol, desertification, endangered species, hazardous wastes, marine life conservation, Ozone layer protection, tropical timber 83, tropical timber 94, wetlands
- Signed, but not ratified: Law of the Sea

== Territorial disputes ==
=== History ===
Thailand shares boundaries with Cambodia, Laos, Malaysia, and Myanmar. The territories of China and Vietnam do not border Thailand, but they are within around 100 km distance.

Many parts of Thailand's boundaries follow natural features, such as the Mekong river. Most borders were stabilized and demarcated in the late 19th and early 20th centuries in accordance with treaties forced on Thailand and its neighbors by the British Empire and French Indochina. In some areas, however, exact boundaries, especially along Thailand's eastern borders with Laos and Cambodia, are still disputed.

=== Cambodia ===
Cambodia's disputes with Thailand after 1951 arose in part from ill-defined boundaries and changes in France's colonial fortunes. Recently, the most notable case has been a dispute over Preah Vihear submitted to the International Court of Justice, which ruled in favor of Cambodia in 1962. During the years that the Cambodian capital, Phnom Penh, was controlled by the Khmer Rouge regime of Pol Pot (1975 to 1979), the border disputes continued.

=== Laos ===
Demarcation is complete except for certain Mekong islets. The border is marked by the Mekong: at high water during the rainy season, the centre line of the current is the border, while during low water periods, all islands, mudbanks, sandbanks, and rocks that are revealed belong to Laos.

=== Malaysia ===
In contrast to dealings with Cambodia, which attracted international attention, boundary disputes with Malaysia are usually handled more cooperatively. Continuing mineral exploration and fishing, however, are sources of potential conflict. One segment at the mouth of the Golok River remained in dispute with Malaysia as of 2023, along with a section of the continental shelf in the Gulf of Thailand.

=== Myanmar ===
Sovereignty over three Andaman Sea islands remains disputed. The standing agreement, negotiated in February 1982, left undetermined the status of Ginga Island (Ko Lam), Ko Kham, and Ko Ki Nok at the mouth of the Kraburi River (Pakchan River). Subsequent negotiations in 1985, 1989, and 1990 made no progress. The two parties have designated the islands as "no man's land". Ongoing tensions in the area resulted in minor clashes in 1998, 2003, and 2013.

== See also ==
- History of Thailand
