= Shan–Thai terrane =

Mass of continental crust extending from Tibet into Southeast Asia

The Shan–Thai or Sibumasu terrane was a microcontinent which extended from Lhasa (Tibet) West Yunnan, Myanmar, West Thailand, much of Malaysia and Sumatra. It was an archipelago with landmasses which shared a similar geological history. The Shan–Thai terrane rifted from Australian plate part of Gondwana in the Permian. It collided with the Indochina and South China terranes almost simultaneously in the Middle Triassic.

Shan–Thai is c. 4,000 km (2,500 mi) long and bounded by the Indochina terrane to the east and the South China terrane to the north. Today Shan-Thai and Indochina form mainland Southeast Asia (the Indochinese Peninsula) but with original palaeo-geographic positions may have been different and their geologic histories also differ.

Its Early Ordovician faunas show affinity with North China-Korea-Australia part of Gondwana on the palaeo-equator, but its Late Ordovician fossils and sedimentary facies have affinity with the South China block. Fortey & Cocks (1998) suggest that North and South China might not have been far as previously proposed and that Sibumasu, which was most similar to South China, may have moved away from North China/Australia towards South China and came to be close to it over the Ordovician.

Shan–Thai was an archipelago on the Paleo-Tethys Ocean spread over several latitudes. It can therefore be subdivided into several portions with different palaeo-geographic histories. The internal "Thai" elements, bordering the Indochina block, are of Cathaysian type and characterised by palaeo-tropical warm-water facies. The external "Shan" part has Gondwanan cold-water facies whilst the central "Sibumasu" part is transitional between the other two. The internal parts of Shan–Thai merged with Laurasia 265 Ma when the Nan-Uttaradit suture closed. Oceanic basins separated the other elements of Shan–Thai until the Late Triassic–Early Jurassic Late Indochina Orogeny.

The collision between the Indian plate and the Eurasian plate during the Oligocene and Miocene resulted in clockwise rotation of southwest Asia, severe deformation of southeast Asia, and the extrusion of Shan–Thai and Indochina blocks. These two blocks are still crisscrossed by the faults from this collision.

== See also ==
- List of tectonic plates
