= Thailand horseshoe bat =

Conservation status
- Least Concern (IUCN 3.1)

Scientific classification
- Kingdom: Animalia
- Phylum: Chordata
- Class: Mammalia
- Order: Chiroptera
- Family: Rhinolophidae
- Genus: Rhinolophus
- Species: R. thailandensis

Binomial name
- Rhinolophus thailandensis Wu, Harada & Motokawa, 2009
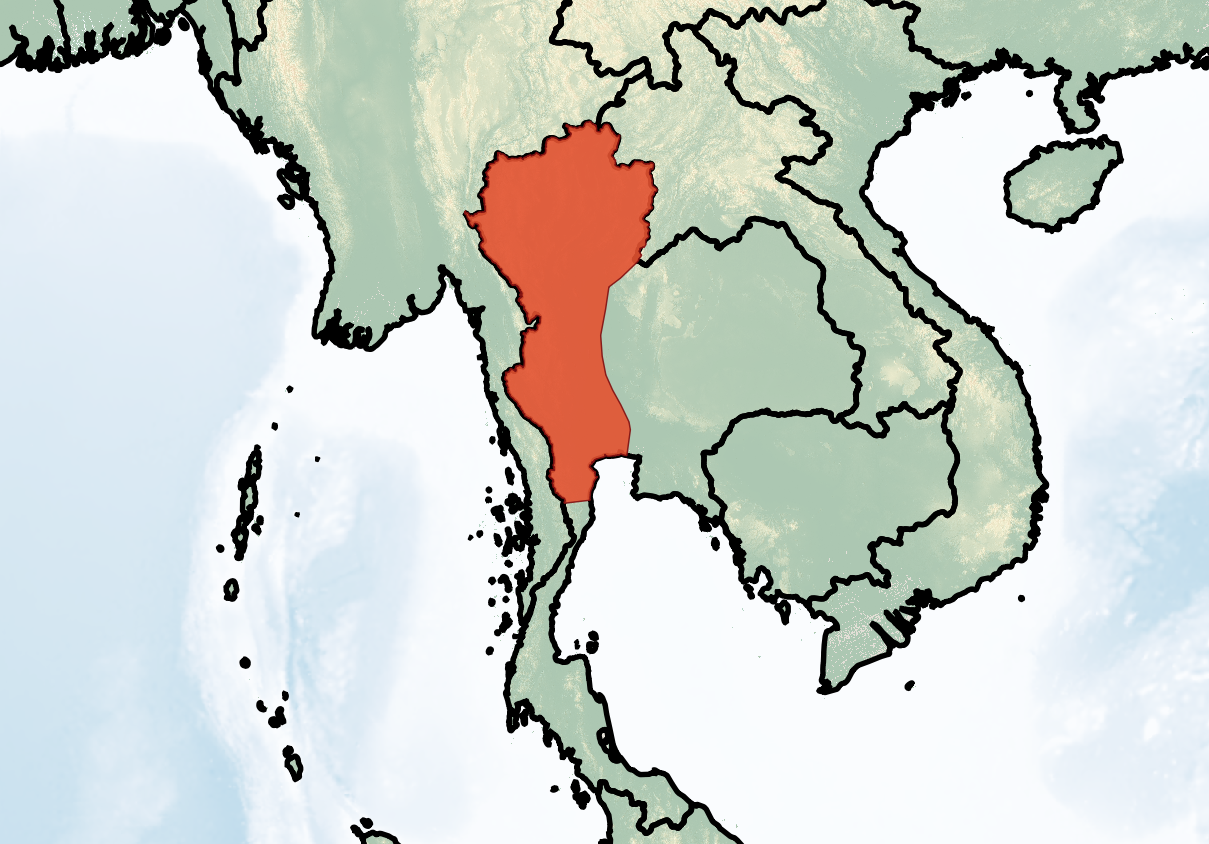

Species of bat

The Thailand horseshoe bat (Rhinolophus thailandensis) is a horseshoe bat endemic to northern Thailand.
