= Thai Game =

Breed of chicken

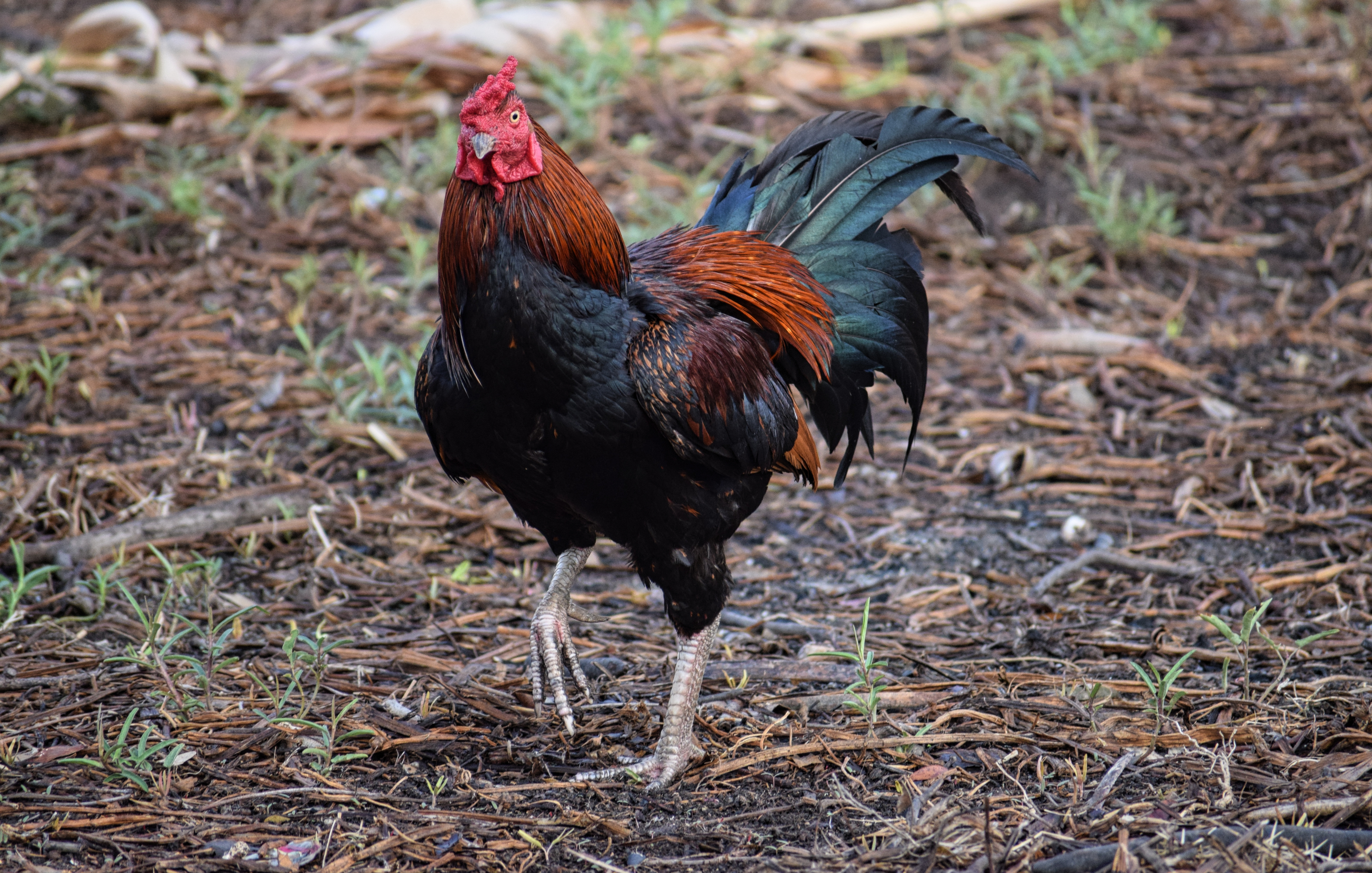
- Cock bird
- Country of origin: Thailand
- Standard: British Poultry Standards 2009
- Use: meat, fancy, fighting

Traits
- Weight: Male: Standard: 3.5 kg; Female: Standard: 2.5 kg
- Egg colour: tinted
- Comb type: Walnut

Classification
- PCGB: Asian Hardfeather
- Chicken; Gallus gallus domesticus

The Thai Game is a breed of hard feather fighting chicken, originating in Thailand, and known as Thai: ไก่ชน. Since 2009 they have been recognised by the British Poultry Standards.

== Description ==
They are described as of Malayoid type, with similarities to Shamo but with a lighter build and higher positioned tail as the most obvious differences. Any colour is accepted, but red black is the most common.

== Gallery ==
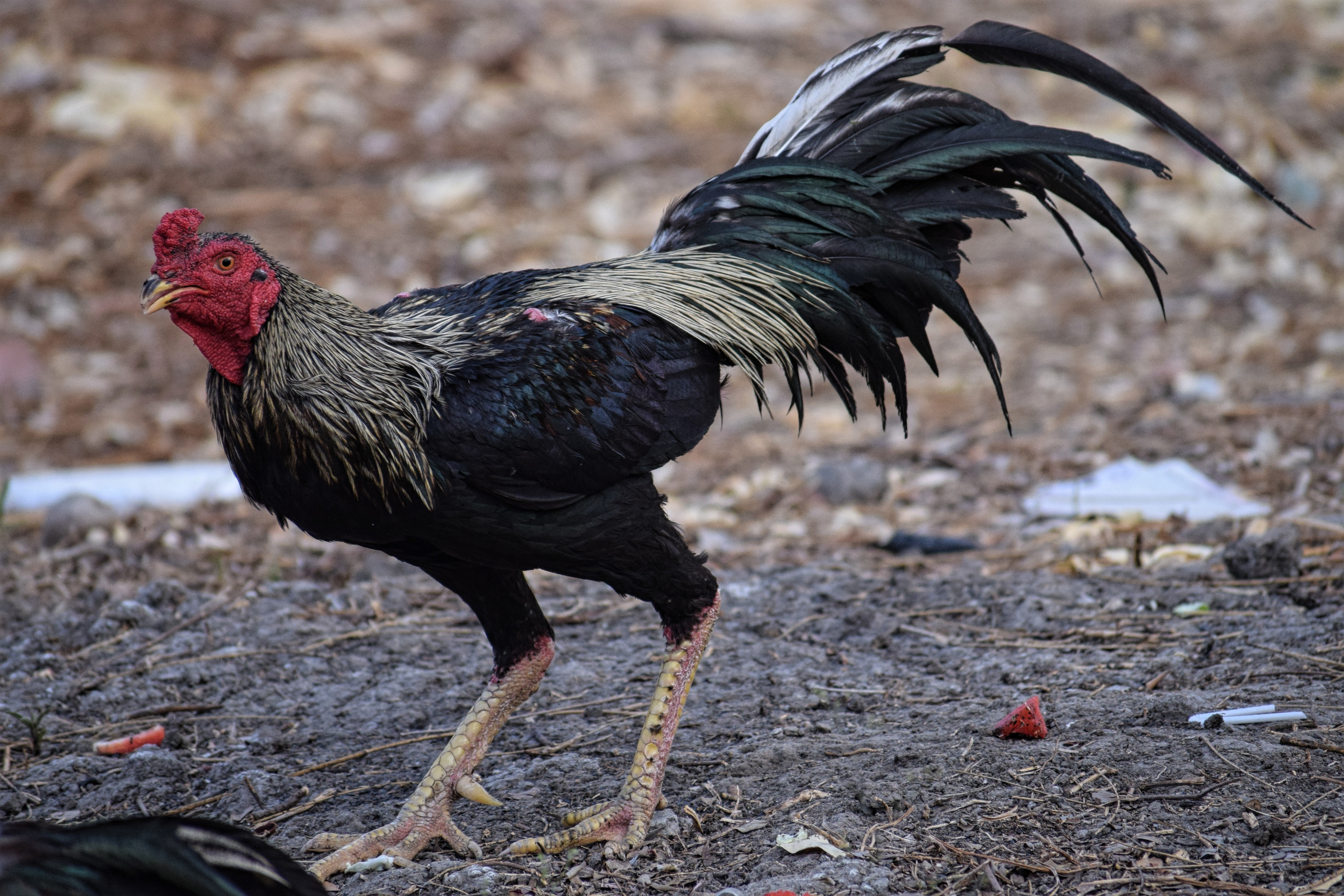
Rooster

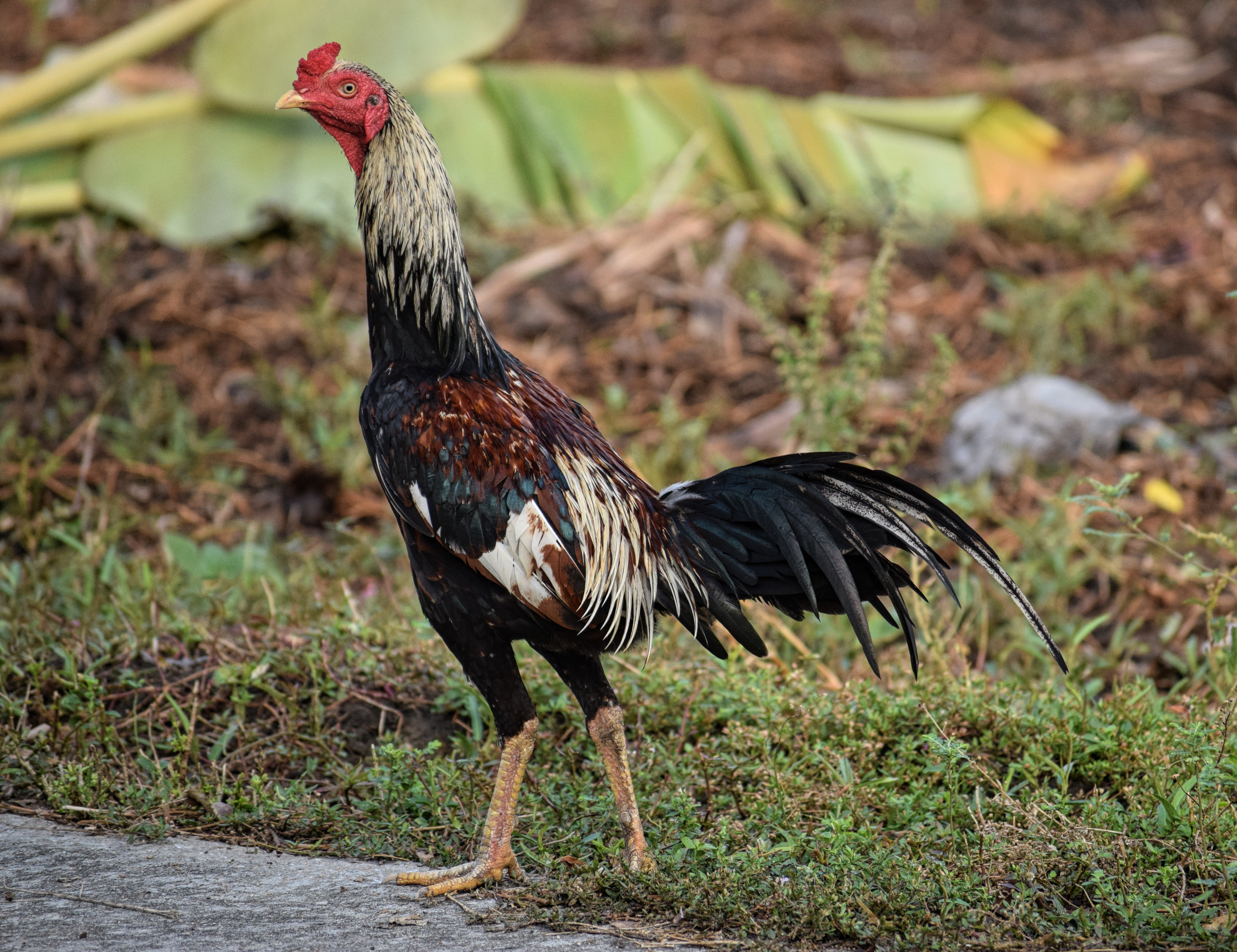
White head

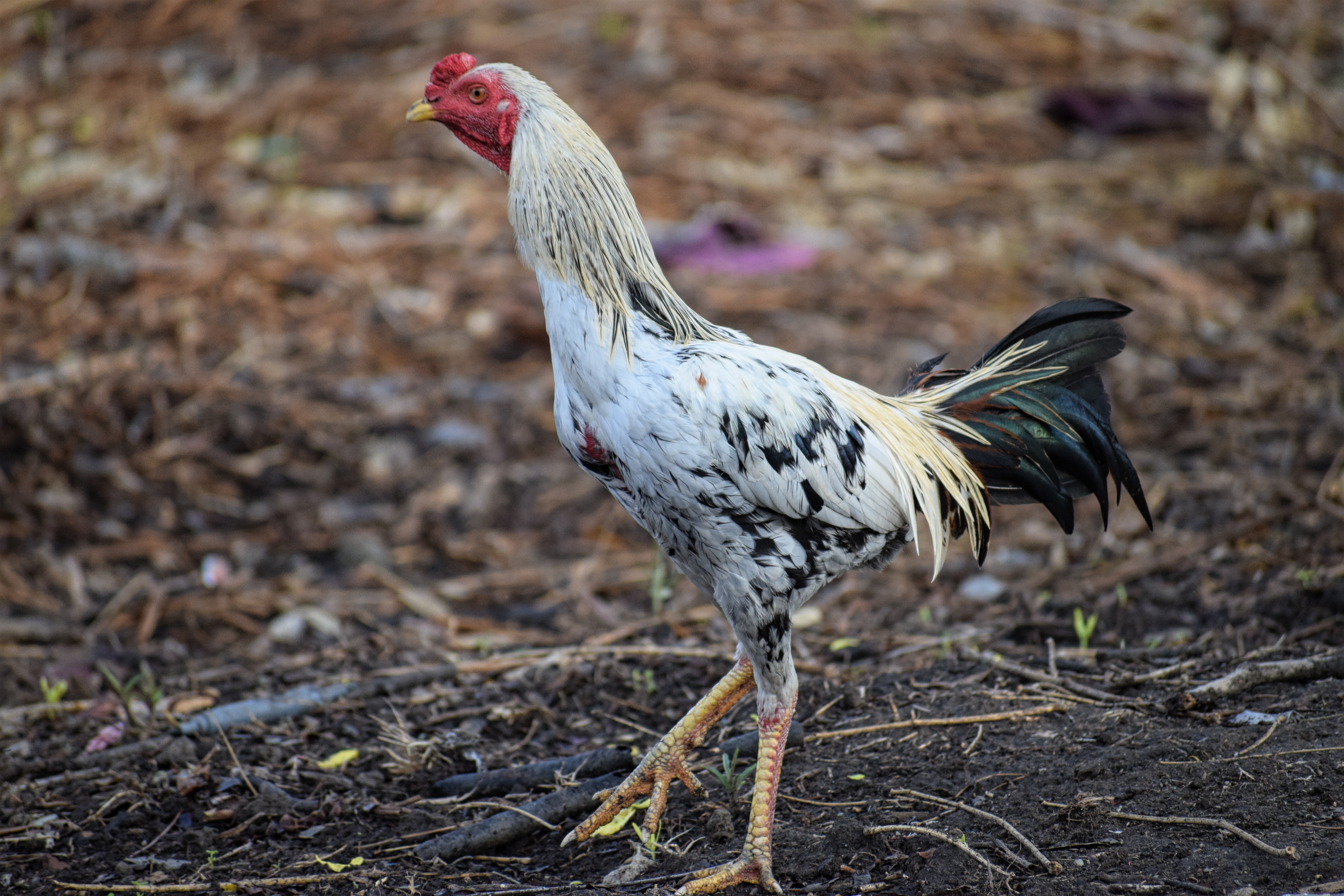
White head
