= Sirindhorn Waterfall =

Waterfall in Thailand

- น้ำตกสิรินธร
- Location within Thailand
- Location: Waeng, Narathiwat, Thailand
- Coordinates: 05°48′06″N 101°49′35″E
- Type: Segmented
- Watercourse: Aikading Canal

Sirindhorn Waterfall (Thai: น้ำตกสิรินธร) is a waterfall in Narathiwat Province, Thailand. It does not fall from a high cliff but is really a stream that comes down from a forest at a higher altitude. It converges with Khlong Aikading and is frequented by locals. Apart from the waterfall, there is the Southern Forest Flowers and Decorative Plants Survey and Collection Project under the Patronage of HRH Princess Maha Chakri Sirindhorn. The project has more than 200 plant species that are grouped according to their natural habitat.

Sirindhorn Waterfall is situated in Waeng District, close to the Thai-Malaysian border. Sirindhorn Waterfall is not a towering fall but more of a gentle stream cascading over smooth rocks and through shallow pools, making it a peaceful place for relaxing or wading.
