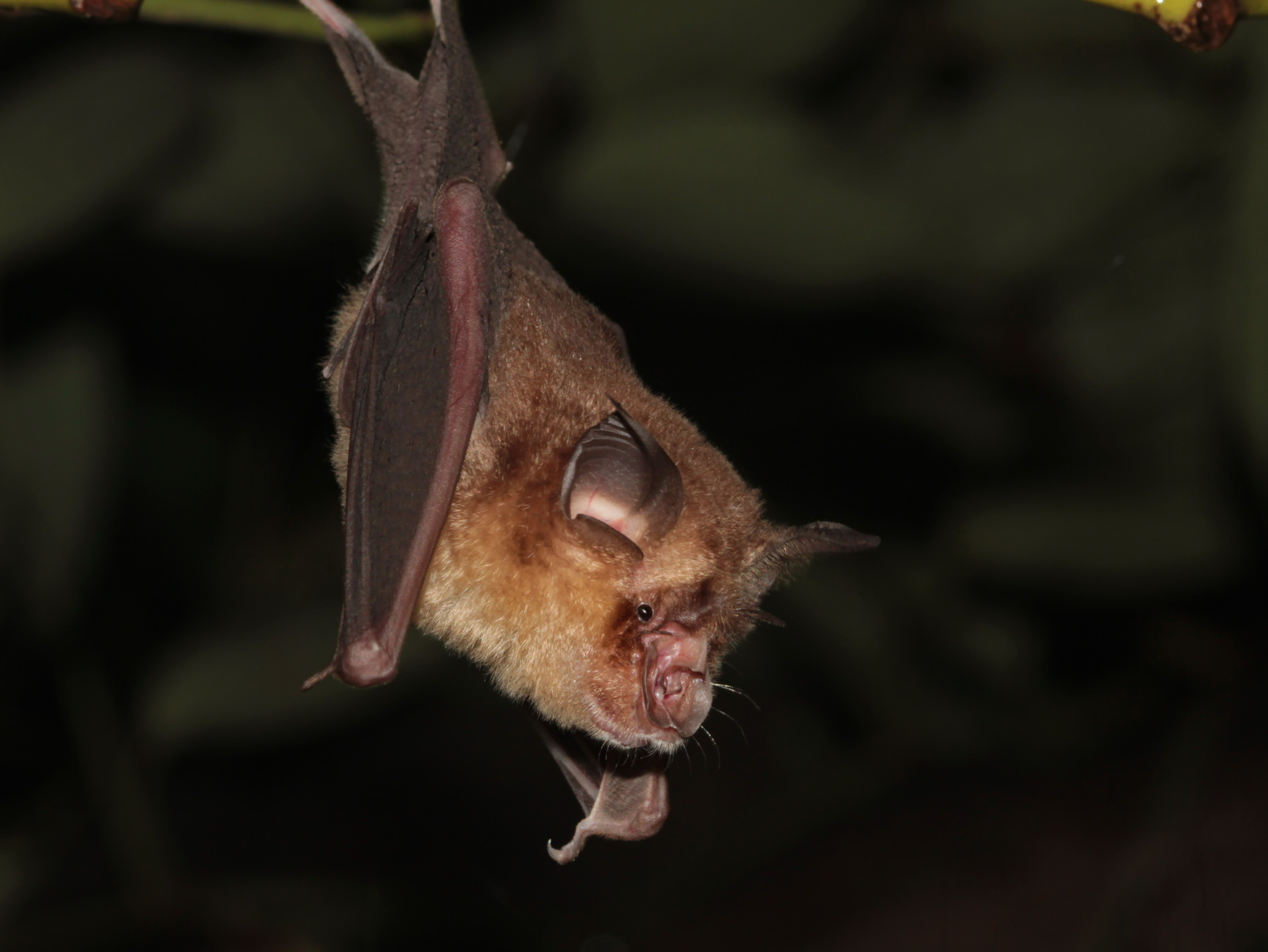

Conservation status
- Least Concern (IUCN 3.1)

Scientific classification
- Kingdom: Animalia
- Phylum: Chordata
- Class: Mammalia
- Order: Chiroptera
- Family: Rhinolophidae
- Genus: Rhinolophus
- Species: R. coelophyllus

Binomial name
- Rhinolophus coelophyllus Peters, 1867
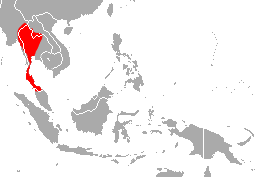
- Croslet horseshoe bat range

= Croslet horseshoe bat =

Species of bat

The croslet horseshoe bat (Rhinolophus coelophyllus) is a species of bat in the family Rhinolophidae. It is found in Laos, Malaysia, Myanmar, and Thailand.

== Range and distribution ==
The species is locally common in Thailand, where a population that may contain approximately 1,000 individuals. The bat is found in broad-leaved mixed deciduous to evergreen forests in a wide altitudinal range in Thailand, including in a number of protected conservation areas. The croslet horseshoe bat is recorded from Myanmar, Salaween River, Thailand, Western Malaysia, and Lao PDR.
