= William Meiklereid =

British diplomat (1899–1965)

Sir William Meiklereid KBE CMG

British Consul-General in San Francisco
- In office 1947–1949
- Preceded by: Sir Cyril Cane
- Succeeded by: John Mitcheson

Personal details
- Born: 12 October 1899
- Died: 12 January 1965 (aged 65)
- Education: Emmanuel College, Cambridge
- Occupation: Diplomat and civil servant

Sir Ernest William Meiklereid (12 October 1899 – 12 January 1965) was a British diplomat and civil servant who served as British Consul-General in San Francisco from 1947 to 1949. He was also the UK's representative at the High Authority of the European Coal and Steel Community from 1955 to 1958.

== Early life and education ==
Meiklereid was born on 12 October 1899, the son of W. Meiklereid. He was educated at Monkton Combe School and Emmanuel College, Cambridge.

== Career ==
After serving with the British armed forces from 1918 to 1919, Mieklereid joined the Far Eastern consular service in 1923 as a student interpreter. He was promoted to vice-consul in 1925, and in 1928 was sent to the Saigon consulate. In 1931, he was at Senggora, and in the following year at Nakhon Lampang and Chiang Mai. In 1934, he was transferred to Batavia, and in the following year was appointed consul at Bangkok.

From 1943 to 1945, he served as consul-general at Dakar, then in a similar post at Saigon from 1945 to 1947, and then at San Francisco from 1947 to 1949. In 1950, he was appointed minister (commercial) at the British Embassy in Paris, a post he held until 1955. From 1955 to 1958, he was head of the UK delegation at the High Authority of the European Coal and Steel Community, and then the UK's representative at the European Atomic Energy Community. He retired from the Foreign Service in 1958.

== Personal life and death ==
Meiklereid married Katherine Perouse de Montelos in 1939. There were no children.

Meiklereid died on 12 January 1965, aged 65.

== Honours ==
Meiklereid was appointed Companion of the Order of St Michael and St George (CMG) in the 1947 New Year Honours. He was appointed Knight Commander of the Order of the British Empire (KBE) in the 1955 Birthday Honours.

Diplomatic posts
Preceded by Sir Cyril Cane	British Consul-General in San Francisco; 1947–1949	Succeeded by John Mitcheson
