= Priya Guha =

British business executive (born 1973)

Priya Guha MBE
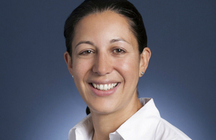

British Consul-General in San Francisco
- In office April 2011 – August 2016
- Prime Minister: David Cameron
- Preceded by: Julian Evans
- Succeeded by: Andrew Whittaker

Personal details
- Occupation: Businesswoman

Priya Guha MBE (born 1973) is a British business executive who is the general manager of Rocketspace in London, a member of the UK Research and Innovation (UKRI) board, and a venture partner at Merian Venture Capital, a venture capital firm that funds female entrepreneurs in tech. Previously, she was a diplomat who served as the British Consul-General in San Francisco from 2011 to 2016. She was the first woman to hold the post.

Guha studied at Christ's College, Cambridge, and joined the Foreign Office in 1996. Prior to San Francisco, she spent four years at the British High Commission in India, where she was First Secretary for Political and Bilateral Affairs (2007–11), leading on Indian politics and the UK-India bilateral relationship.

== Activism ==
Priya is an advocate for female entrepreneurs. In a published letter she wrote to her younger self, she quotes how she had experienced bias as a woman in the workplace and now advocates for inclusivity in her role at Merian Ventures and as Trustee for the charity TechSheCan.

Diplomatic posts
Preceded by Julian Evans	British Consul-General in San Francisco; 2011–2016	Succeeded by Andrew Whittaker
