= List of consuls-general of the United Kingdom in San Francisco =

The British Consulate-General, San Francisco, is the United Kingdom's local consulate for Northern California, as well as Alaska, Idaho, Montana, Nevada (except Clark County (Las Vegas)), Oregon, Wyoming, and Washington State. There is also a Consulate-General in Los Angeles.

== List of consuls-general of the United Kingdom to San Francisco ==
- 1898–1901: Clayton Pickersgill CB
- 1901–1907: Sir Courtenay Bennett Kt CIE
- 1907–1911: Sir Walter Hearn KBE
- 1911–1921: Alexander Ross CB
- 1922–1931: Sir Gerald Campbell GCMG
- 1931–1938: Archibald Charlton CMG
- 1938–1941: Sir Paul Butler KCMG
- 1941–1945: Sir Godfrey Fisher KCMG
- 1945–1947: Sir Cyril Cane KBE
- 1947–1949: Sir William Meiklereid KBE CMG
- 1949–1952: John Mitcheson CMG OBE
- 1952–1954: Kenneth White CBE
- 1954–1957: Sir Robert Hadow KBE CMG MC
- 1957–1960: Sir Herbert Marchant KCMG OBE
- 1960–1963: Randle Reid-Adam CBE
- 1963–1965: Lancelot Pyman CMG
- 1965–1967: Peter Dalton CMG
- 1967–1970: John Lloyd CBE
- 1970–1973: Sir James Murray KCMG
- 1973–1977: Robert Farquharson CMG
- 1977–1982: Ian Kinnear CMG
- 1982–1986: John Beaven CMG CVO
- 1987–1990: Sir Graham Burton KCMG
- 1990–1994: Antony Ford CMG
- 1994–1998: Malcolm Dougal
- 1998–2001: Michael Frost LVO
- 2001–2003: Roger Thomas CMG
- 2003–2007: Martin Uden
- 2007–2011: Julian Evans
- 2011–2016: Priya Guha
- 2016–2020: Andrew Whittaker
- 2020-2023: Joe White MBE
- 2023-2025: Tammy Sandhu MBE
- 2025-present Eleanor Kiloh
