= Lampang horse carriage =

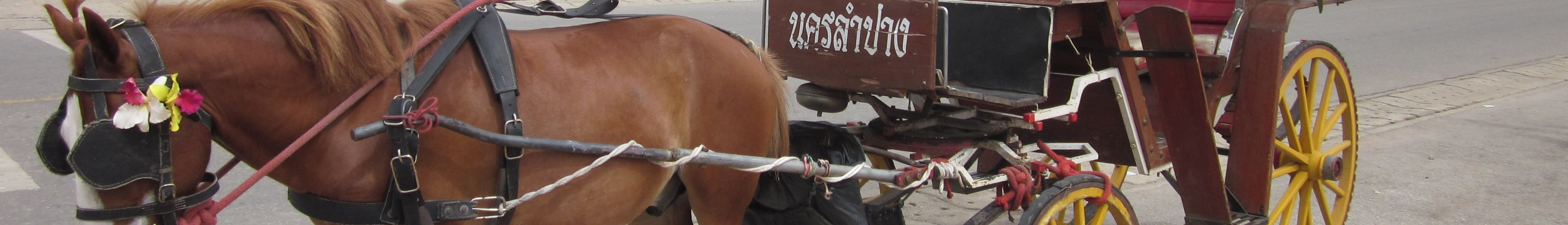
Horse carriage

The Lampang horse carriage is the use of horse-drawn carriages in the Thai city of Lampang.

== History ==
In 1916, during the King Rama V era, the city of Lampang was governed by Don Bunyawat Wongmanit. During that period, under European influence, horse carriages were brought to Thailand. There is debate as to the origins of Lampang's first horse carriages. Some believe they came from Bangkok, where they were the main transport for government officers in the capital city. Others suggest they came from Burma, where similar carriages can still be found in Maymyo, near Mandalay. The horse carriage was used in many upcountry areas in Thailand. Lampang is the only province to continue using them.

Some carriages are still drawn by native Thai horses, which genetic studies have found to be related to the Mongolian horses known as Przewalski's horse.
