= Cyril Cane =

British diplomat (1891–1959)

Sir Cyril Cane KBE

British Consul-General in San Francisco
- In office 1945–1947
- Preceded by: Sir Godfrey Fisher
- Succeeded by: Sir William Meiklereid

Personal details
- Born: 6 July 1891
- Died: 31 December 1959 (aged 68) San Francisco
- Children: 3
- Occupation: Diplomat

Sir Cyril Hubert Cane (6 July 1891 – 31 December 1959) was a British diplomat who served as consul-general in San Francisco from 1945 to 1947.

== Early life and education ==
Cane was born on 6 July 1891, the son of Dr Howard Cane and Alice Barrell. He was educated at Blackheath Proprietary School and Epsom College.

== Career ==
Cane was employed in the Consulate-General at Antwerp from 1908 to 1914. On the outbreak of World War I he was commissioned into the Royal West Kent Regiment, and served in Mesopotamia.

After the war Cane joined the Consular Service, and served as vice-consul at Addis Ababa from 1919 to 1922. From 1923 to 1928 he served as vice-consul at San Francisco. After a short period at the Department of Overseas Trade, he returned to San Francisco and was promoted to consul in 1929, a post he held until 1937. In 1939 he was transferred to Detroit, and was promoted to consul-general there in 1944. The following year, he returned to San Francisco as consul-general, a post he held until 1947, and in 1948 was transferred to Rabat where he held a similar appointment until he retired in 1951. He returned to San Francisco where he lived in retirement until his death.

== Personal life and death ==
Cane married Gertrude Lois, née Sancton, in 1922, and they had a son and two daughters.

Cane died in San Francisco on 31 December 1959, aged 68.

== Honours ==
- Cane was appointed Member of the Order of the British Empire (MBE) in the 1929 Birthday Honours.
- He was appointed Commander of the Order of the British Empire (CBE) in the 1943 Birthday Honours.
- He was appointed Knight Commander of the Order of the British Empire (KBE) in the 1950 New Year Honours.

Diplomatic posts
| Preceded by Sir Godfrey Fisher | British Consul-General in San Francisco; 1945–1947 | Succeeded by Sir William Meiklereid |
