= Ratsadaphisek Bridge =

Coordinates: 18°17′35.63″N 99°30′2.77″E

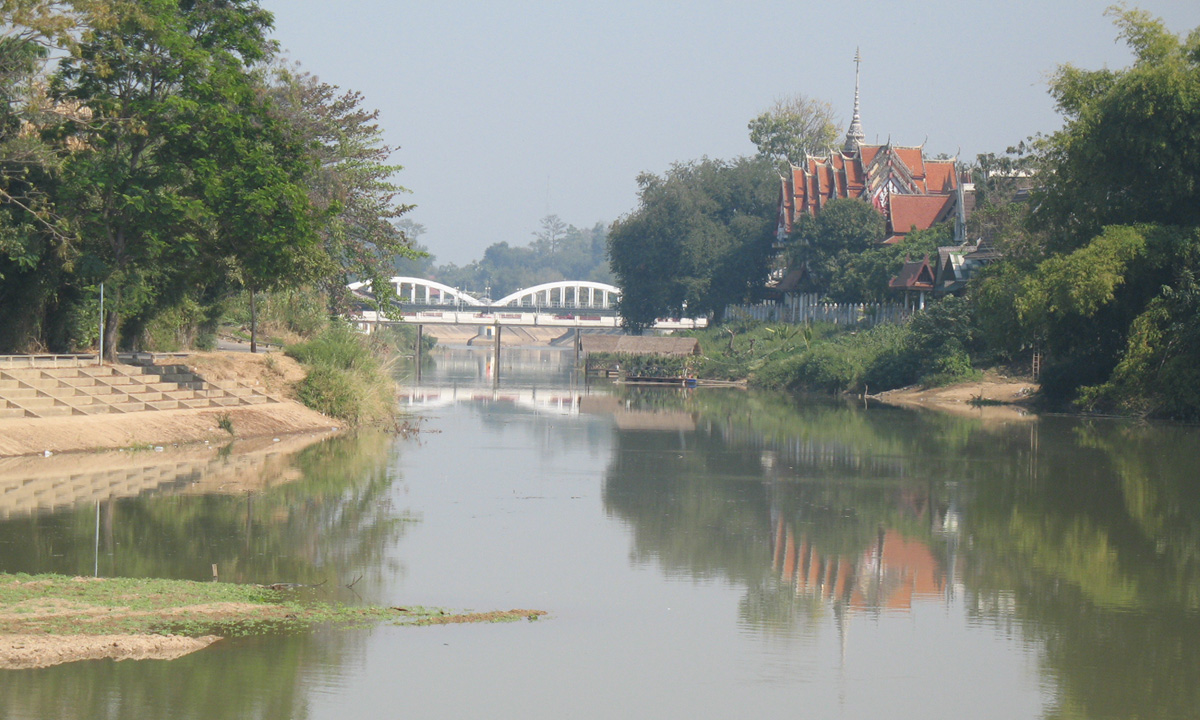
Wang River and Ratsadaphisek Bridge is ahead

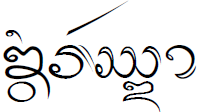
Ratsadaphisek Bridge (Thai: สะพานรัษฎาภิเศก; Northern Thai: ขัวรัษฎา) is a bridge across Wang River in the area of Tambon Hua Wiang, City of Lampang, Lampang Province, northern Thailand. It serves to connect outer and inner City of Lampang.

Originally, it was a wooden bridge that the ruler of Nakhon Lampang, Chao Noranan Chaichaowalit (เจ้านรนันทไชยชวลิต) together with Lampang people had built to commemorate King Chulalongkorn (Rama V)’s Anniversary of his 25th year Accession to the throne in 1894. The name "Ratsadaphisek" refers to 25th Anniversary Celebration or Silver Jubilee. However, there is another name that is commonly called "White Bridge" according to its characteristics. The bridge collapsed twice because of the large number of logs being washed downstream during the monsoon period and was rebuilt in reinforced concrete bridge in 1917.

During World War II the bridge was painted in camouflaging colours so as to avoid being bombed by the Allies, who were also advised that the bridge had no strategic significance. After the war it was repainted in white. It has white rooster emblems and royal garudas decorated at the bridgehead.

Today, Ratsadaphisek Bridge is regarded as one of the landmarks of Lampang Province, as well as Wat Phra That Lampang Luang. At the end of the bridge in the inner city side is the location of a very busy local flea market especially at night of Saturday-Sunday called "Kat Kong Ta" (กาดกองต้า).
