= Paul Dalrymple Butler =

British diplomat (1886–1955)

Sir Paul Dalrymple Butler
- Butler in 1949
- Born: 2 March 1886
- Died: 2 February 1955 (aged 68); Bristol
- Occupation: British diplomat

Sir Paul Dalrymple Butler KCMG (2 March 1886 – 2 February 1955) was a British diplomat.

== Biography ==
Butler was educated at Bedford School. He joined the British Diplomatic Service in 1908 and, following diplomatic postings in Tokyo, Seoul, Manila, Taiwan, Yokohama and Mukden, he was appointed as Consul-General in San Francisco, between 1938 and 1941. He was Director-General of the Far Eastern Bureau of the Ministry of Information in New Delhi, between 1942 and 1943, Counsellor to the Foreign and Commonwealth Office, in 1944, and British Minister to the Far Eastern Regional Committee of the United Nations Relief and Rehabilitation Administration, between 1944 and 1946.

Sir Butler married Helen Maxima Scranton (b. Seoul, Korea), daughter of Methodist missionaries to Korea, Dr. William Benton Scranton and Louise Wyeth "Loulie" Arms Scranton.

Sir Paul Dalrymple Butler was invested as Commander of the Order of St Michael and St George in 1938, and as a Knight Commander of the Order of St Michael and St George in 1944. He retired from the Diplomatic Service in 1946 and died in Bristol in 1955, aged 68.

Diplomatic posts
Preceded by Archibald Charlton CMG	British Consul-General in San Francisco; 1938-1941	Succeeded by Sir Godfrey Fisher KCMG
