= Lampang =

Lampang ลำปาง ᩃᩣᩴᨻᩣ᩠ᨦ
- City Municipality
- Lampang City Municipality เทศบาลนครลำปาง ᩅ᩠ᨿᨦᩃᩣᩴᨻᩣ᩠ᨦ
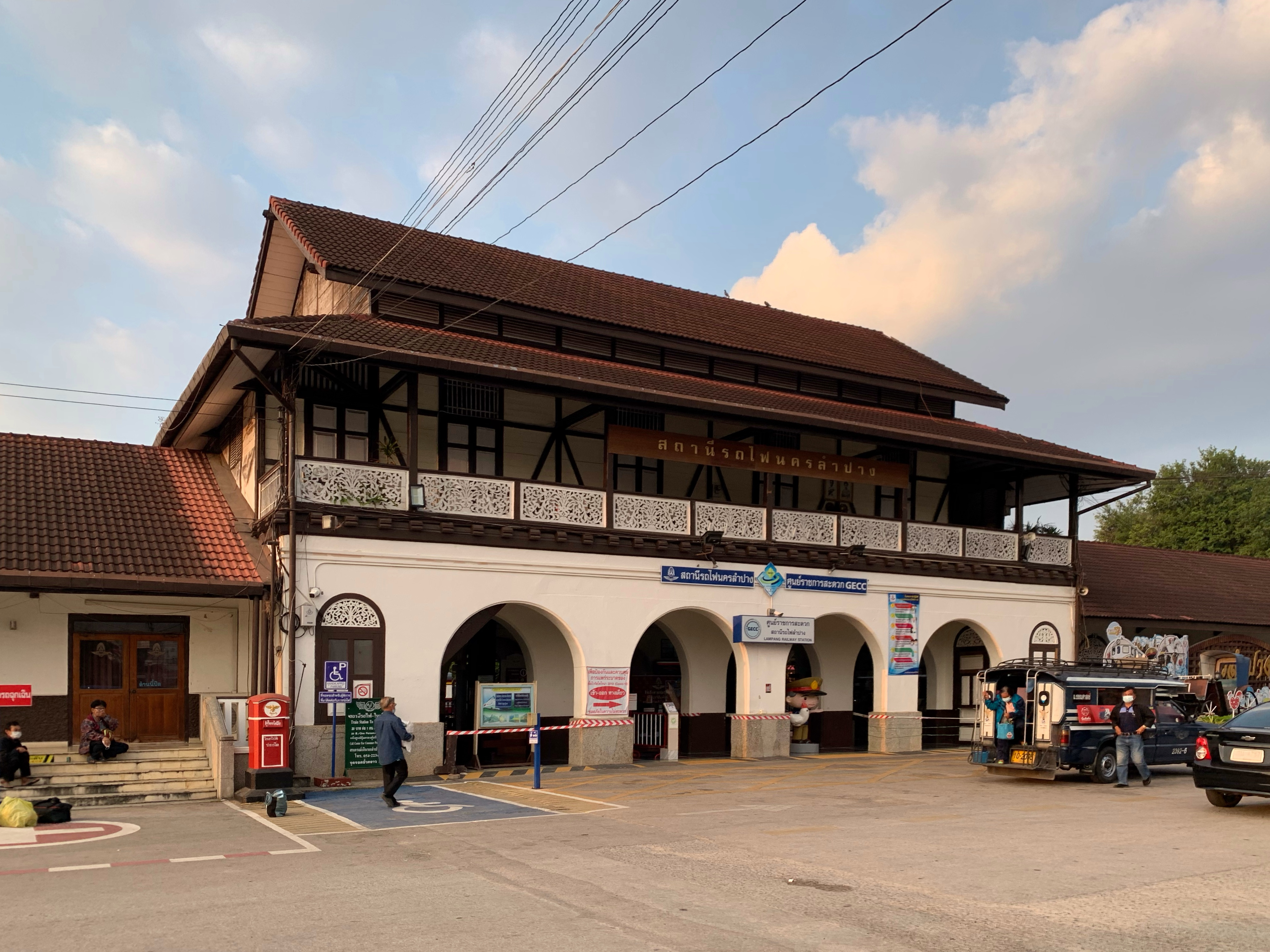
- Nakhon Lampang railway station

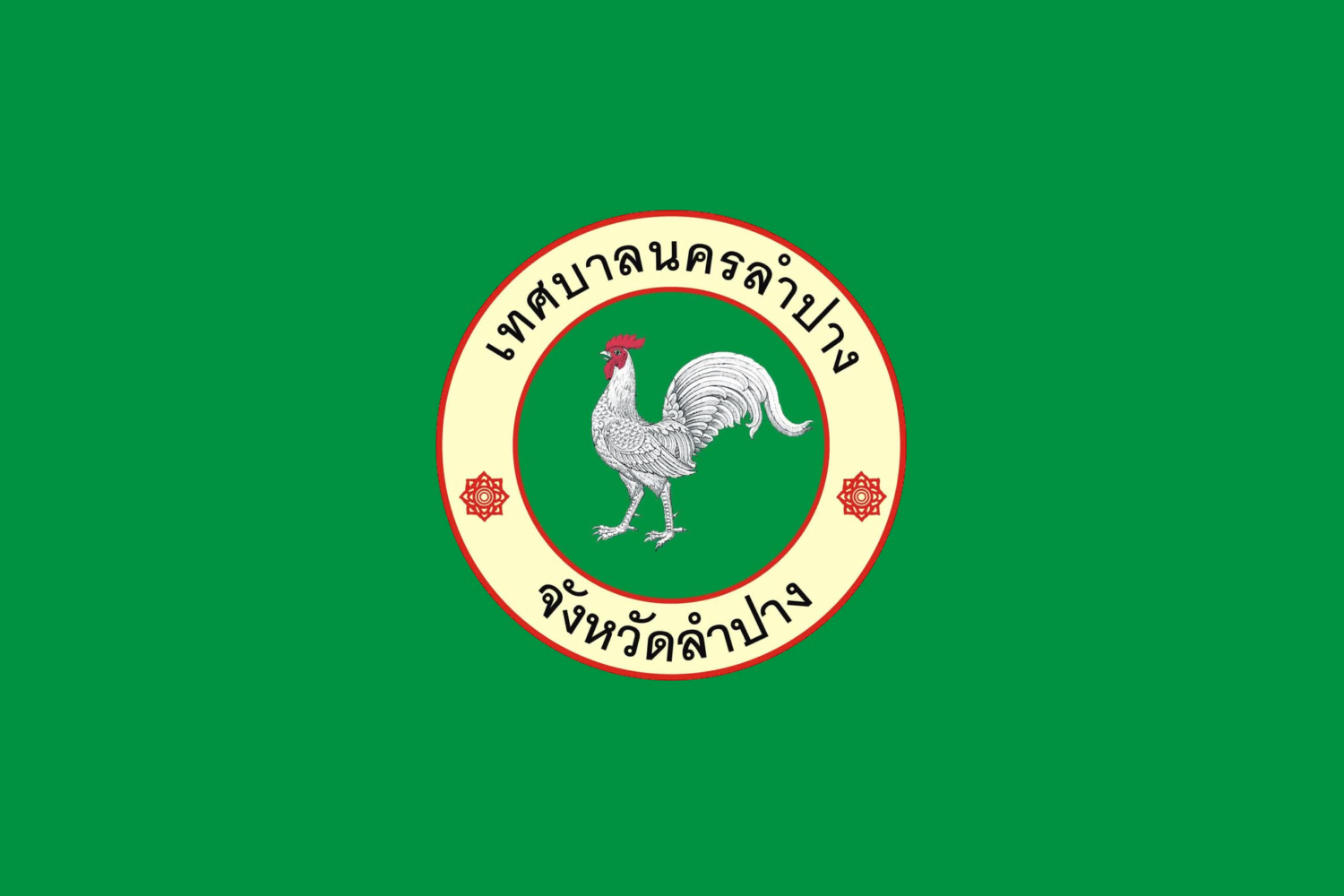
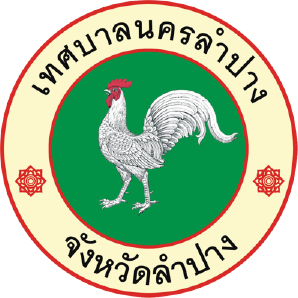
- Flag Seal

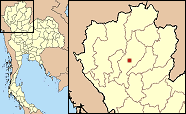
- Location in Northern Thailand

- Location in Thailand
- Coordinates: 18°18′N 99°30′E
- Country: Thailand
- Province: Lampang
- District: Mueang Lampang

Government
  - Type: City Municipality
  - Mayor: Punnasin Maninant

Area
  - Total: 22.17 km^{2} (8.56 sq mi)

Population (2010)
  - Total: 58,074
  - Density: 2,619/km^{2} (6,784/sq mi)
- Time zone: UTC+7 (ICT)
- Area code: (+66) 54
- Website: lampangcity.go.th

Lampang
- "Lampang" in Thai language (top) and Northern Thai with Tai Tham script (bottom)

Thai name
- Thai: ลำปาง
- RTGS: Lampang

Northern Thai name
- Northern Thai: ᩃᩣᩴᨻᩣ᩠ᨦ (Lam phuang)

Lampang, also called Nakhon Lampang (Northern Thai: ᩃᩣᩴᨻᩣ᩠ᨦ; Thai: นครลำปาง, pronounced [náʔkʰɔːn lampaːŋ]) to differentiate from Lampang province, is the third largest city in northern Thailand and capital of Lampang province and the Mueang Lampang district. Traditional names for Lampang include Wiang Lakon and Khelang Nakhon. The city is a trading and transportation center. Lampang lies 601 km (373 mi) north of Bangkok and 101 km (63 mi) southeast of Chiang Mai.

== Geography ==
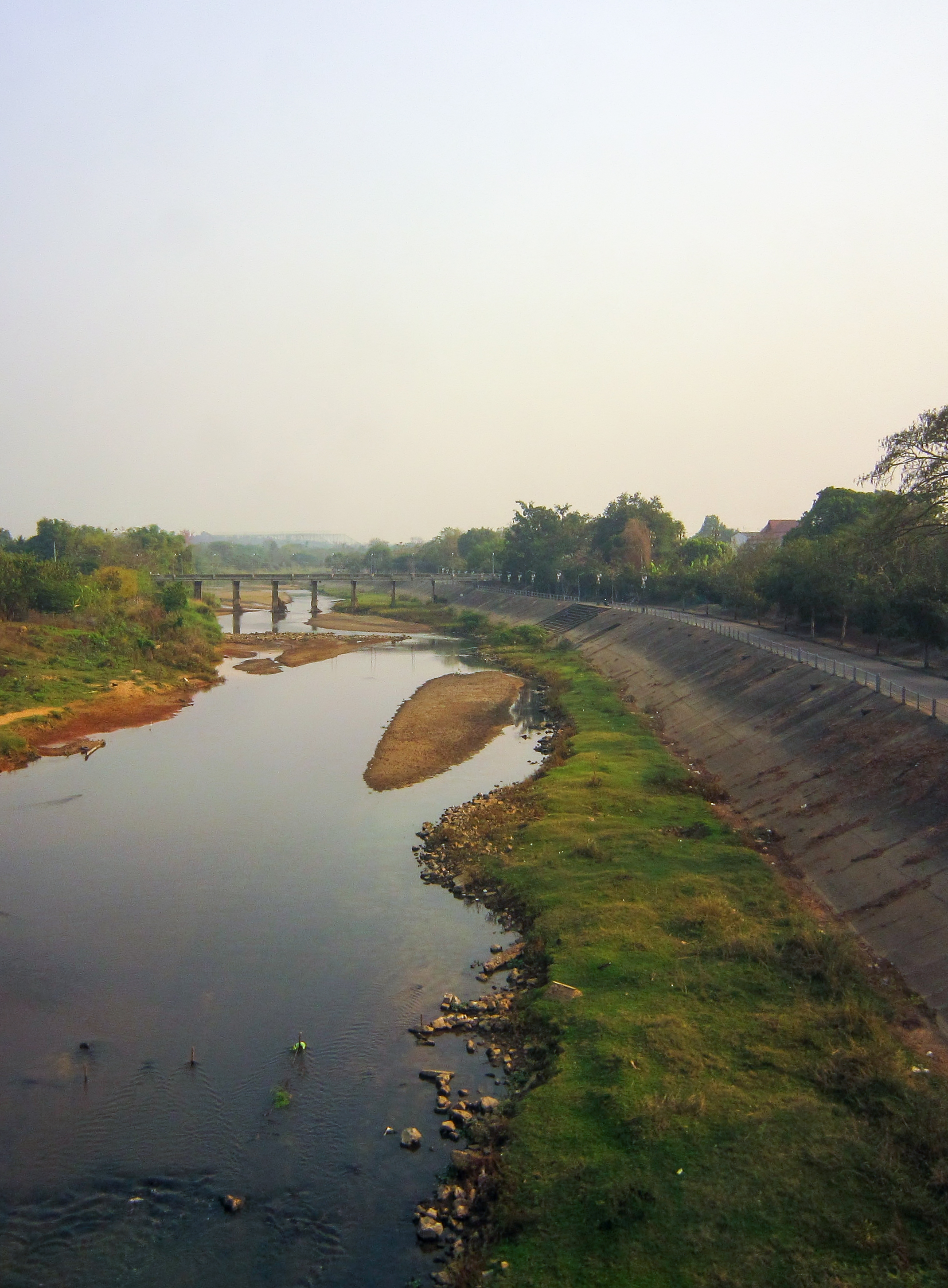
Wang River

Lampang city is in the valley of the Wang River, bordered by the Khun Tan Range on the west and the Phi Pan Nam Range on the east. The river, a major tributary of the Chao Phraya, flows through the city. The city lies mainly on the south side of Wang River, although the old parts of the city had been originally developed in the north side of it. Nowadays, downtown Lampang has grown in the southeast of the river along Bunyawat and Pahon Yothin Roads.

== History ==
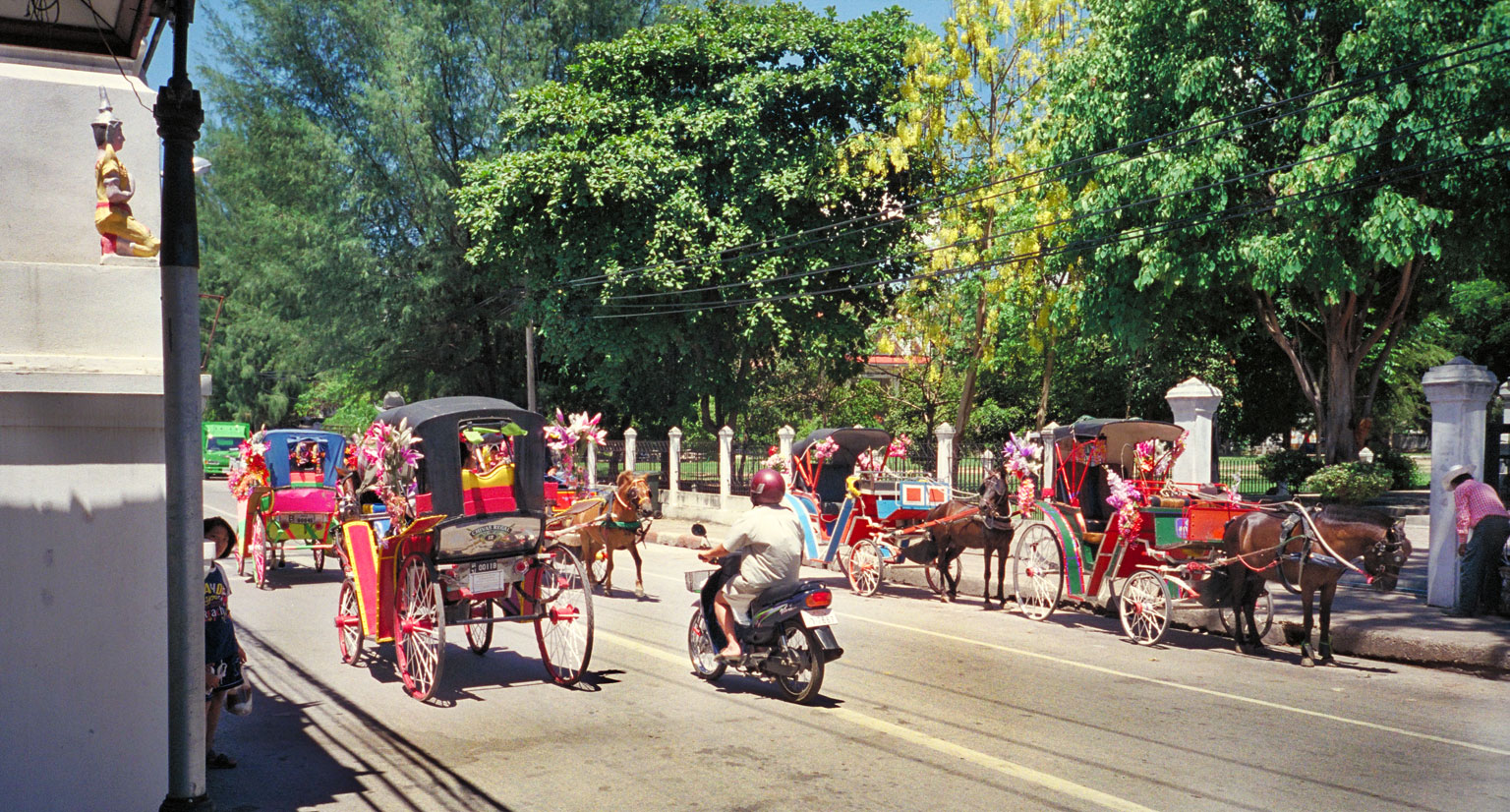
Horse carriages in Lampang

Lampang was a major city in the Lanna kingdom. However, its historical prominence is largely overshadowed by Chiang Mai or Chiang Rai which were the traditional seats of government, and whose histories were well recorded in chronicles. Following decades of warfare with both the Ava Burmese and Ayudhya during the 17th-18th century, the region was in decline, severely depopulated, and subject to Burmese control.

In the late 18th century, the famed marksman and Lampang native Nan Thipchang assassinated the local Burmese leader in Wat Phra That Lampang Luang, and led an uprising which led to a rollback of Burmese rule over Lanna. Allied with Bangkok, the descendants of Nan Thipchang, known as Chao Ched Ton (the seven princes), became the vassal rulers of the various Lanna cities until the annexation of Lanna into Siam (Thailand) proper under King Chulalongkorn (Rama V).

=== Modern history ===
During the late 1800s and early 1900s, the region experienced a growth in teak logging. Lampang later became home to Louis Leonowens, who operated teak plantations around Lampang. During the Ngiao Rebellion, Lampang was attacked by 200 Shan rebels led by Phaka Mong on 3 August 1902. Prior to this, the ruler of Lampang assembled a force of 1,000 and Leonowens had organized defences around the town. They were also reinforced by 54 policemen from Chiang Mai led by Danish captain Hans Markvard Jensen. The following battle resulted in the defeat of the Shans, however Chao Bunwatwongse, Lampang's ruler, was evacuated to Chiang Mai over fears of another attack but returned to Lampang on August 7.

In 1894, the Ratsadaphisek Bridge across the Wang river was opened and became the longest bridge in Thailand at the time. However, the flow of logs down the Wang caused damage to the bridge until the current version was completed in 1917. On 1 April 1916, the first train arrived at Nakhon Lampang Railway Station, which was then the northernmost train station in Thailand.

==== World War II ====
During World War II, Lampang became an important location for Japanese operations as the main Japanese headquarters in Thailand, as well as the target of Allied bombings. In 1942, a squadron of P-40 Tomahawks belonging to the American Flying Tigers were supposed to bomb Lampang, but mistook Lamphun for Lampang and returned after seeing no troop movements in Lamphun. The Allied forces also attempted to bomb the Ratsadaphisek Bridge to disrupt Japanese operations.

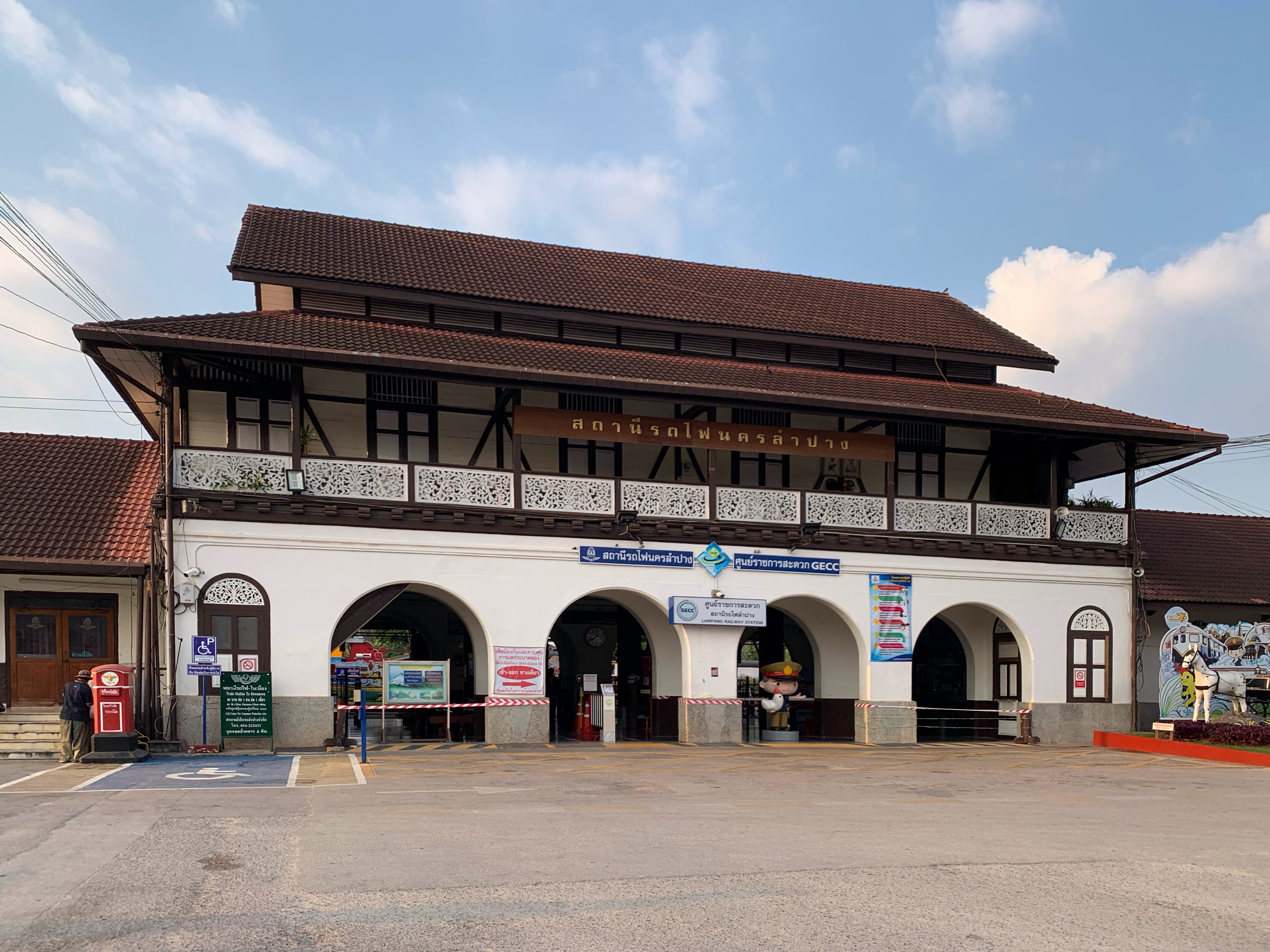
Nakhon Lampang railway station

== Climate ==
Lampang has a relatively dry climate relative to nearby provinces. "Winter" starts after the last rains, typically November, and lasts until March. Cold air masses from Siberia sometimes lead to nighttime temperatures below 10 °C (50 °F), although that is quite rare. Winter is characterized by dry, sunny, and quite pleasant days, and cool and occasionally foggy nights. In recent times, the blue winter sky is often marred by the practice of burning the fields after the harvest, as well as the smog generated by Mae Mo coal-fired power plants.

Summer typically runs from March until June. The temperature could soar to 40–43 °C (104–109 °F) in April. Late afternoon thunderstorms and hailstorms are frequent.

Rainy season runs from June until November, and significant rain may occur in May as well. Being in a relative rain shadow, Lampang receives less precipitation than neighboring provinces and rarely suffers from the flooding which has plagued Chiang Mai in recent years.

Climate data for Lampang (1991–2020, extremes 1951-present)
Month	Jan	Feb	Mar	Apr	May	Jun	Jul	Aug	Sep	Oct	Nov	Dec	Year
Record high °C (°F)	36.9 (98.4)	40.0 (104.0)	42.5 (108.5)	44.0 (111.2)	43.6 (110.5)	41.1 (106.0)	38.6 (101.5)	37.6 (99.7)	38.2 (100.8)	37.8 (100.0)	36.5 (97.7)	36.0 (96.8)	44.0 (111.2)
Mean daily maximum °C (°F)	31.8 (89.2)	34.6 (94.3)	37.3 (99.1)	38.4 (101.1)	36.0 (96.8)	34.5 (94.1)	33.6 (92.5)	33.0 (91.4)	33.1 (91.6)	32.6 (90.7)	32.1 (89.8)	30.7 (87.3)	34.0 (93.2)
Daily mean °C (°F)	22.6 (72.7)	24.9 (76.8)	28.2 (82.8)	30.2 (86.4)	29.2 (84.6)	28.6 (83.5)	28.0 (82.4)	27.5 (81.5)	27.3 (81.1)	26.5 (79.7)	24.7 (76.5)	22.4 (72.3)	26.7 (80.0)
Mean daily minimum °C (°F)	15.6 (60.1)	16.9 (62.4)	20.5 (68.9)	23.8 (74.8)	24.4 (75.9)	24.6 (76.3)	24.3 (75.7)	24.0 (75.2)	23.2 (73.8)	22.5 (72.5)	19.4 (66.9)	16.2 (61.2)	21.3 (70.3)
Record low °C (°F)	3.9 (39.0)	8.1 (46.6)	11.5 (52.7)	17.2 (63.0)	18.5 (65.3)	21.9 (71.4)	21.2 (70.2)	21.2 (70.2)	19.6 (67.3)	14.1 (57.4)	7.1 (44.8)	3.7 (38.7)	3.7 (38.7)
Average precipitation mm (inches)	14.7 (0.58)	8.7 (0.34)	27.8 (1.09)	69.7 (2.74)	176.4 (6.94)	119.7 (4.71)	139.3 (5.48)	202.7 (7.98)	209.7 (8.26)	106.3 (4.19)	21.3 (0.84)	10.9 (0.43)	1,107.2 (43.59)
Average precipitation days (≥ 1.0 mm)	1.0	1.0	2.5	5.0	12.3	11.1	13.0	15.4	14.9	8.4	2.1	1.1	87.8
Average relative humidity (%)	71.2	62.2	57.4	60.1	71.7	75.5	77.4	81.0	82.8	82.1	78.0	75.0	72.9
Average dew point °C (°F)	16.2 (61.2)	15.9 (60.6)	17.6 (63.7)	20.5 (68.9)	22.8 (73.0)	23.4 (74.1)	23.3 (73.9)	23.6 (74.5)	23.8 (74.8)	22.9 (73.2)	20.1 (68.2)	17.1 (62.8)	20.6 (69.1)
Mean monthly sunshine hours	272.8	257.1	294.5	243.0	198.4	156.0	120.9	117.8	144.0	182.9	216.0	254.2	2,457.6
Mean daily sunshine hours	8.8	9.1	9.5	8.1	6.4	5.2	3.9	3.8	4.8	5.9	7.2	8.2	6.7
Source 1: World Meteorological Organization
Source 2: Office of Water Management and Hydrology, Royal Irrigation Department (sun 1981–2010)(extremes)

== Economy ==
Besides the traditional rice paddy farming, pineapple, and sugarcane constitute major food crops in Lampang Province. The province has a large deposit of lignite in Mae Moh district, fuelling several coal-fired electricity generating plants, whose pollution has severely affected the local populations. Lampang also has a large deposit of kaolin which is widely utilized in the ceramics industry. Historically, logging was an important industry, since Lampang, together with nearby Phrae had a large stand of teak. Many elephants were employed to transport the logs to the river for transport to Bangkok, hence the founding of an "elephant school", the predecessor of the Thai Elephant Conservation Center. Much of the old growth teak stands in Lampang had been thoroughly harvested.

== Culture ==
Lampang, also called "mueang rot ma" in Thai, meaning "horse carriage city", is considered by some Thais as the last paradise in Thailand. It is about 100 km (62 mi) to the southeast of Chiang Mai. Although well-connected by rail, and four lane highways to both Bangkok and Chiang Mai, it is here that tourists can still find horse-drawn carriages in regular use for transportation. One account attributes the horse-drawn carriage to the Portuguese, via Macau, although a more likely origin is colonial Burma. Lampang was an important center of the timber industry in the early-20th century and saw an influx of migrants from British-controlled Burma. The horse-drawn carriage is one of the most memorable symbols of Lampang, as reflected in many traditional products.

Lampang has a few institutions of higher learning, such as Yonok College, and a branch of Thammasat University.

== Health ==
The main hospital of Lampang is Lampang Hospital, operated by the Ministry of Public Health.

== Transportation ==
The city is an important highway hub, with a four lane highway link to Chiang Mai and Chiang Rai, as well as a major highway to Phrae and the eastern Lanna provinces. Lampang is roughly a 1.5 hour bus ride to Chiang Mai. Nakhon Lampang railway station is a stop for the Chiang Mai-bound train, approximately 10 hours from Bangkok.

Lampang Airport is served by Bangkok Airways (three flights daily to Suvarnabhumi Airport) and Nok air (four flights daily to Don Mueang) (Oct 2015).

== Landmarks and tourist attractions ==
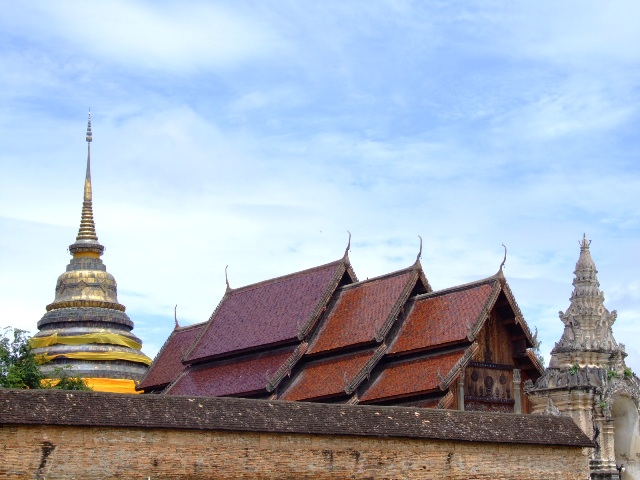
Wat Phradhart Lampangluang

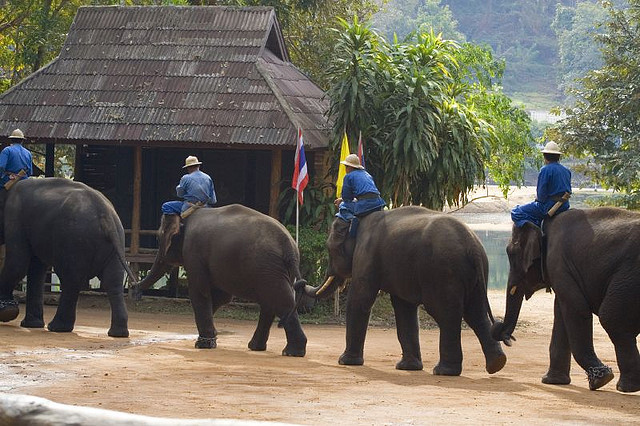
Elephant train in Thai Elephant Conservation Center, Hang chat district Lampang, Thailand

Tourists typically stop by for lunch and visit the more famous attractions such as Wat Phra That Lampang Luang and the Thai Elephant Conservation Center and then proceed to points further north such as Chiang Mai or Chiang Rai. Less well-known tourist attractions in Lampang are thus mostly visited by locals. Among these are the Wang Kaeo Waterfall and the Chae Son National Park, a compact park which combines a natural hot spring with large waterfalls.

Many temples in downtown Lampang were built in the Burmese -style, originally endowed by the logging tycoons of the late-19th century. Wat Si Bun Rueang, Wat Si Chum and Wat Pa Fang are among the extant examples. Nine of the 31 remaining Burmese-style temples in Thailand are in Lampang. Traditional Lanna architecture can be found at Wat Phra That Lampang Luang, on the site of ancient Lampang city. It is famous for its murals from the 19th century. The city seal features a white rooster in the temple's gate.

Wat Phra Kaeo Don Tao, on the west bank of the Wang River, is said to have housed the Emerald Buddha between 1436 and 1468. Wat Phra That Chedi Sao (The Temple of Twenty Chedis) is famous for its array of twenty pagodas. Other temples of some renown include Wat Phra That Chom Ping and Wat Lai Hin both in the Ko Kha District.

Mae Mo mine is a vast open pit lignite mine in the Mae Mo basin. The mine and the adjoining power generation facilities are operated by EGAT. The power plant is a major source of electric power for Thailand.

Lampang is known for its horse-drawn carriages, which were introduced in 1916 and remain popular with tourists.

== Education ==
Lampang has a number of educational institutions, including kindergartens, primary, secondary and vocational schools. Schools teach in the English, Thai, and Chinese languages. Lampang also has a number of universities: Lampang Rajabhat University, Rajmangala University of Technology, Nation University (formerly Yonok) and a satellite campus of Thammasat University. Lampang College of Commerce and Technology (LCCT) and Lampang International Technical College (LIT) are well known schools which teach technology.
