= Wat Phra That Lampang Luang =

Lanna-style Buddhist temple in Thailand

- วัดพระธาตุลำปางหลวง
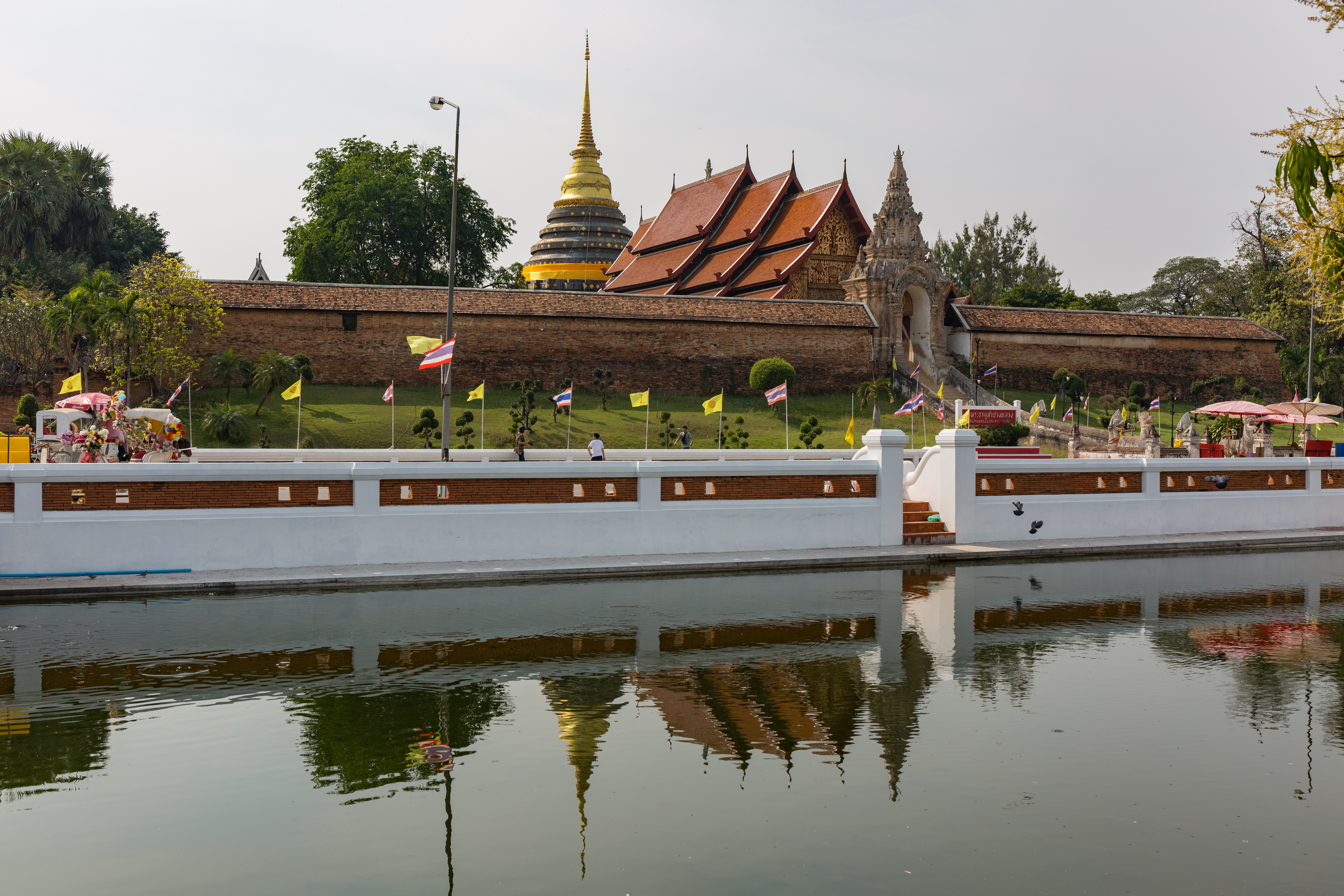
- Wat Phra That Lampang Luang in 2016

Religion
- Affiliation: Buddhism

Location
- Location: Ko Kha subdistrict, Ko Kha district, Lampang province
- Country: Thailand
- Interactive map of Wat Phra That Lampang Luang
- Coordinates: 18°13′2″N 99°23′20″E

Architecture
- Established: c. 15th century

Wat Phra That Lampang Luang (Northern Thai: ᩅᩢ᩠ᨯᩕᨻᨵᩣᩩ᩠ᨲᩃᩴᩣᨻᩣ᩠ᨦᩉᩖᩅ᩠ᨦ; Thai: วัดพระธาตุลำปางหลวง) is a Lanna-style Buddhist temple in Lampang in Lampang Province, Thailand. It was built in the 15th century and located in the northern city of Lampang about 15 kilometers away. It is one of the best maintained temple that show the early Lanna architect and artifacts that show the culture within that age.

The temple is said to enshrine a relic of the Buddha. Such relics are typically bones and ashes believed to be gathered after the Buddha's cremation. The relic is installed in the main chedi of the temple.

== History ==
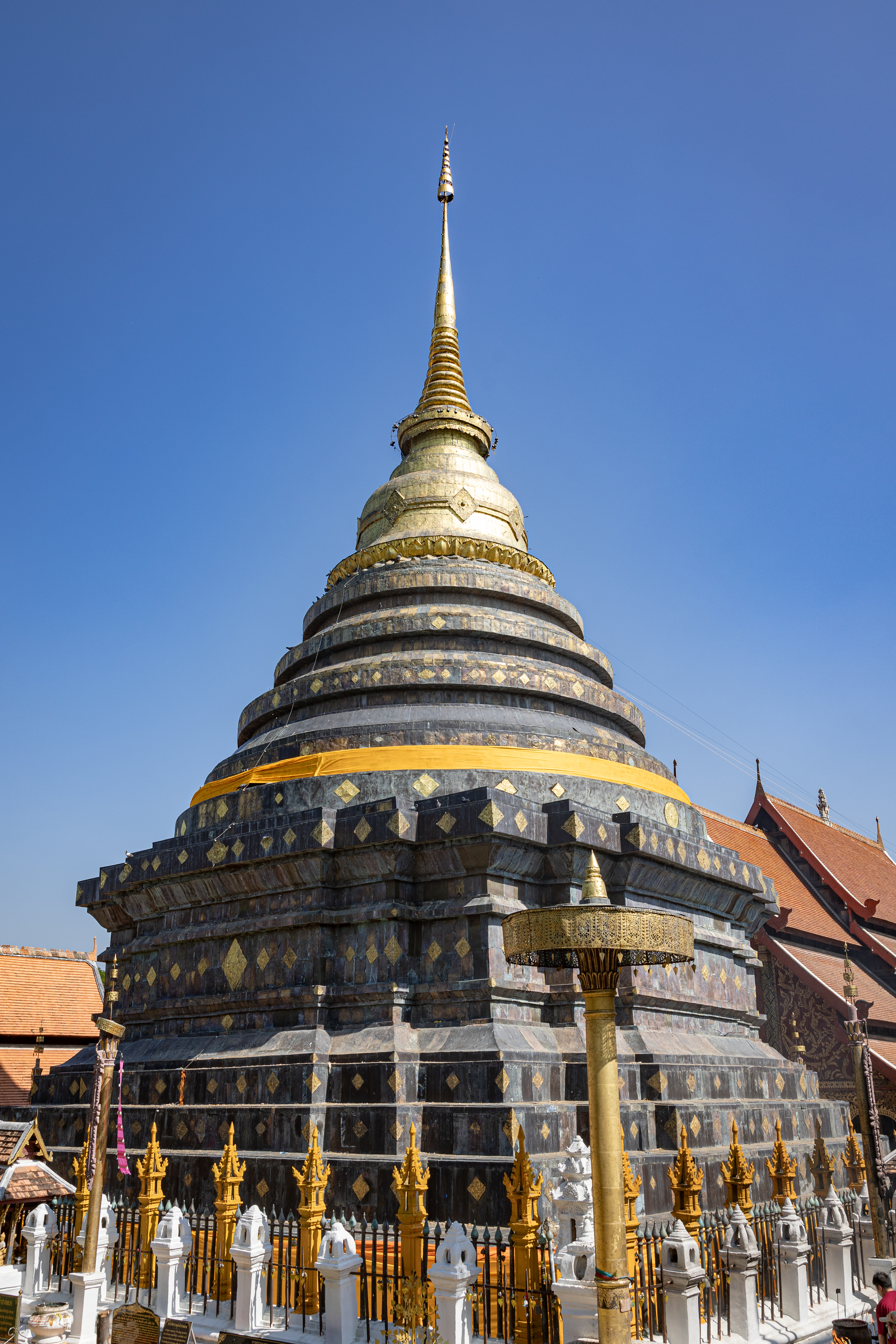
Phra That Lampang Luang

Wat Phra That Lampang Luang was founded in the 15th century. There is also a myth about the earlier beginnings of the temple, when the northern territories of present-day Thailand were called the Hariphunchai Kingdom.

In 1732, Chiang Mai and Lamphun cities were taken over by Burmese armies. The Burmese king turned his attention to Lampang. He ordered his armies to occupy the city, which was a deserted and had no ruler at that time. Wat Phra That Lampang Luang got taken and turned into an enemy camp, but not expecting an attack from the defenders. Phraya Chaisongkhram, formerly known as Thipchang (Divine Elephant), gathered his men and sneaked into the temple ready for surprise attack. As a result of this raid, he shot the king, who commanded the Burmese army, resulting in the defeat of the enemy.

Thipchang became the ruler of Lampang and started the Chet Ton dynasty, or officially Thippachak.

Today, a statue of Thipchang, who became a hero, can be seen in the temple complex. Moreover, bullet marks visible on the walls are evidence of these turbulent events.

== Architecture ==
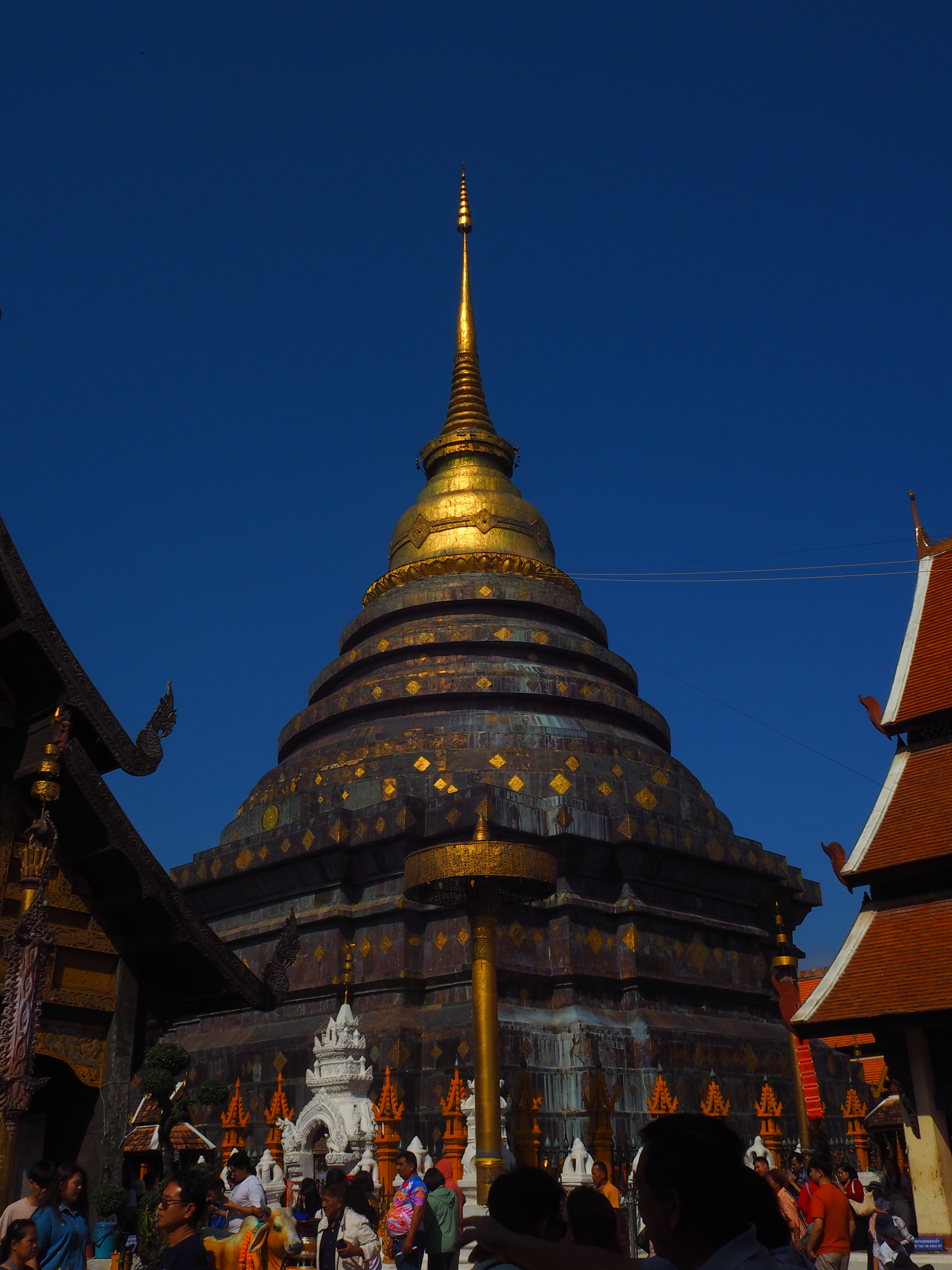
Phra That Lampang Luang Chedi

Wat Phra That Lampang Luang is recognized as one of the most authentic and best-preserved examples of Lanna architecture in Northern Thailand. The temple complex showcases the elegance of ancient craftsmanship through its wooden halls, tiered roofs, and artistic carvings that reflect the harmony between faith and culture.

=== The Main Chedi (Stupa) ===
The central golden stupa, designed in a classic bell shape, stands as a symbol of the Lanna style. Its base is lotus shaped, and the body is covered with bronze or copper sheets that give it a shimmering golden glow. According to tradition, this stupa enshrines relics of the Buddha, making it one of the most sacred monuments in Lampang.

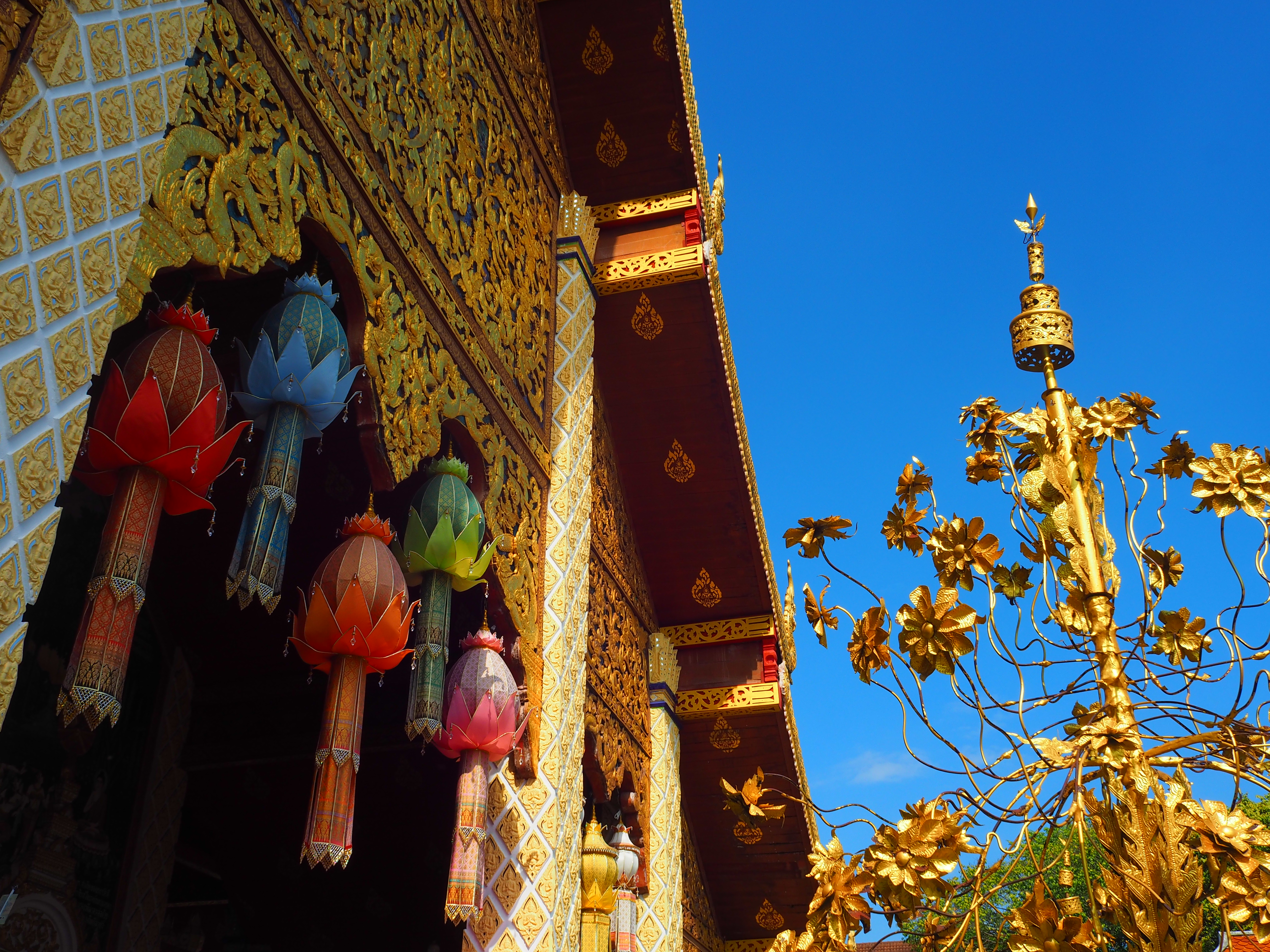
decorative detail showing the gold lacquer

=== Wiharn Luang (Main Vihara) ===
The principal vihara dates back to the 15th century and reflects the open-hall design typical of Lanna temples. It has three tiered roofs covered with traditional wooden shingles and is supported by tall wooden columns. The open sided layout allows both monks and laypeople to join ceremonies from inside or outside, creating a harmonious and communal setting.

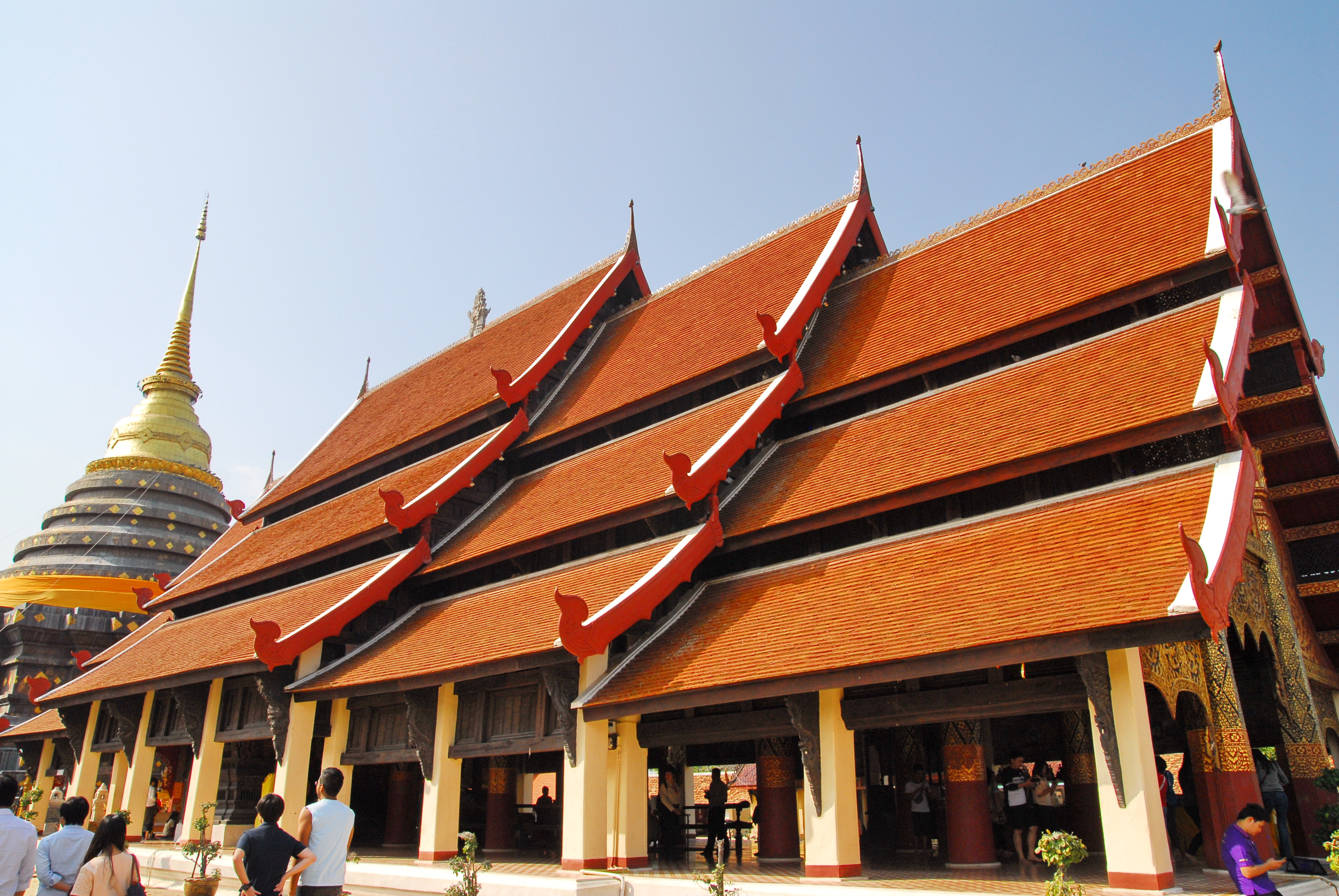
Wiharn Luang

=== Wooden Craftsmanship and Roof Design ===
Most of the temple’s structures are made entirely of teak and local hardwood, showcasing the delicate craftsmanship of ancient Lanna artisans. The tiered roofs not only enhance aesthetic balance but also improve air circulation perfectly suited for the northern climate.

=== Decorative Details ===
The gables, doors, and windows are decorated with fine wood carvings depicting lotus patterns, guardian creatures, and Buddhist symbols. The interior pillars are covered in gold lacquer, creating a sacred and graceful atmosphere. These detailed decorations show the deep devotion and artistic mastery of Lanna craftsmen.

== Mythology ==
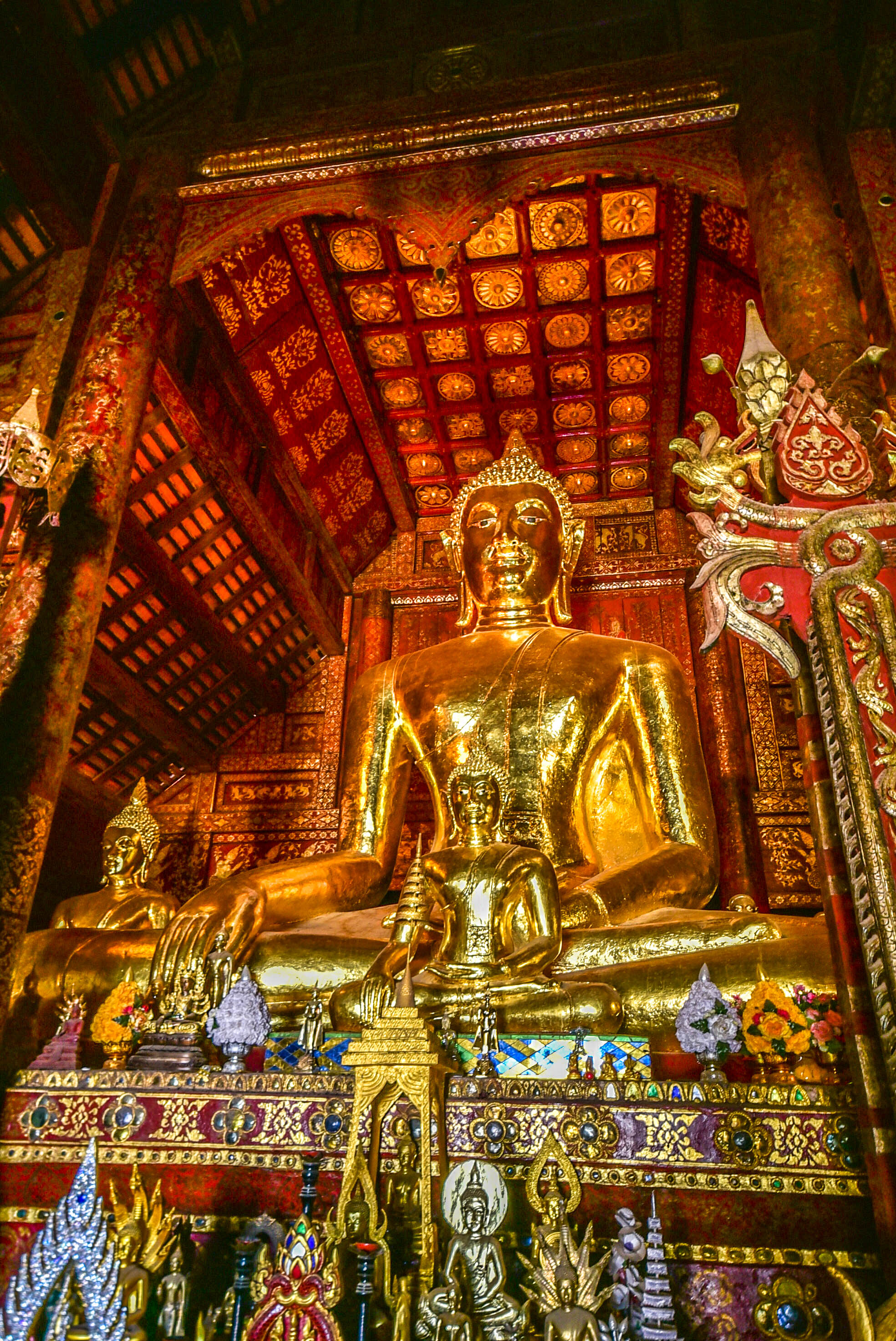
Buddha statue in Wat phra That Lampang Luang

=== Legend of Buddha ===
According to a local legend, the Buddha once passed through this area. The indigenous Lawa people offered him honey, in a wooden tube. The Buddha then discarded the wooden tube and threw it away. After that, he announced that this place would in the future become known as Lampakappa Nakhon. According to the story, he also gave the people a single hair from his head. They decided to put the hair in a gold casket and buried the casket in an underground tunnel with other valuables.

The chedi of Wat Phat That Lampang Luang was later built over this spot. This relic of the Buddha is believed by devotees to still be at the base of the chedi together with ashes from the Buddha’s right forehead and neck.

=== Shade of Phra That ===
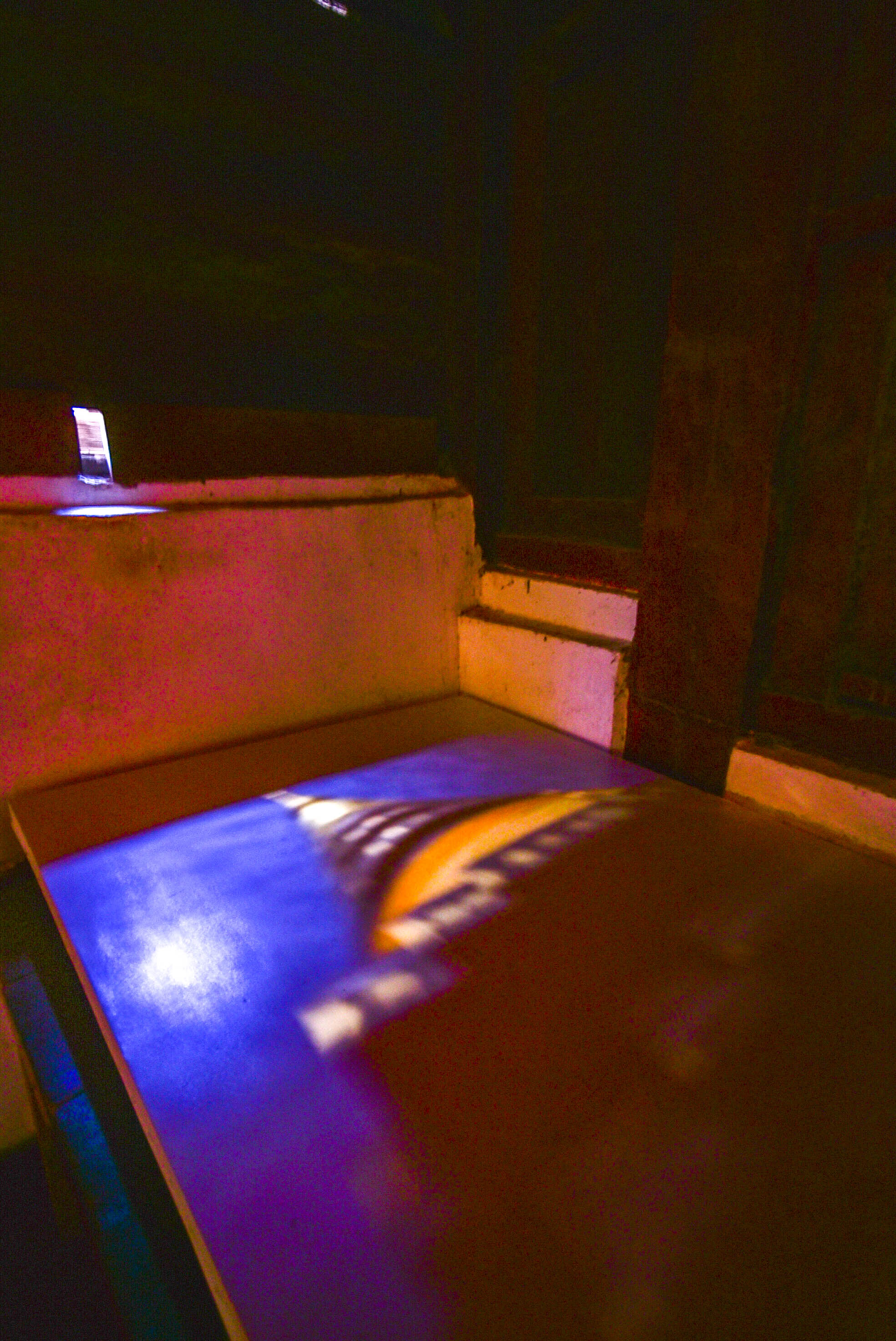
Shade of Chedi inside the Viharn Luang

The shade of the Phra that is considered a phenomenon of light refraction, operating on the same principle as a pinhole camera projecting the picture of Pagoda. However, the reason this phenomenon make Wat Phra that Lamphang Luang so unique because it appear in many spot around the Pagoda.Till this day, there are only 2 spots where these phenomenon can be seen clearly, being inside the Viharn and Ho Phra Phutthabaht.

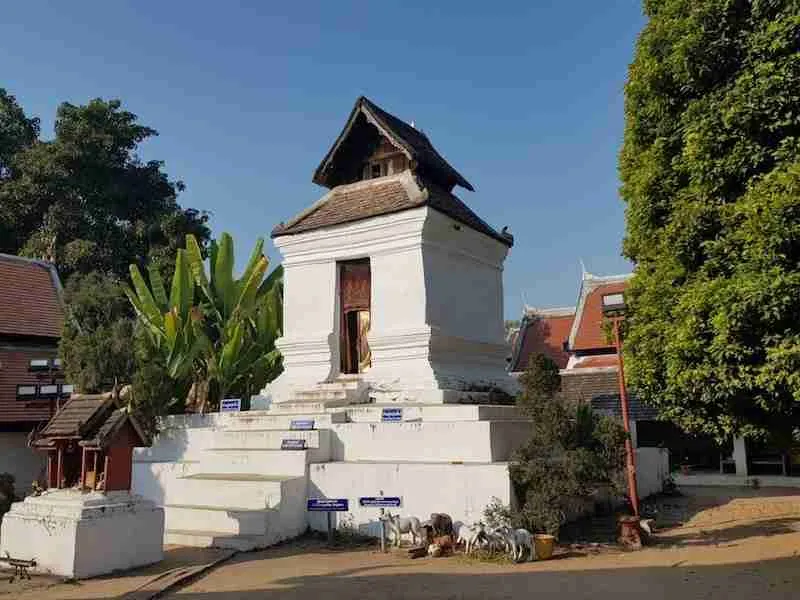
Ho phra puttabaht

Inside the Viharn these phenomenon appear by a light shining through a small hole inside the wall and project the picture of the pagoda with a very clear and bright colour; however, the colour became faded and unclear because people often poke their finger in the hold that project the light which make the hold wider and lose it sharpness.

This phenomenon can also be observed in Ho Phra Phutthabaht, the pavilion holding the Buddha footprint. The image of the Phra That appears upside down within a room inside the pavilion. However, this cannot be seen by all visitors as the entrance to the area is prohibited for women in accordance with Lanna beliefs.

== Image Gallery ==
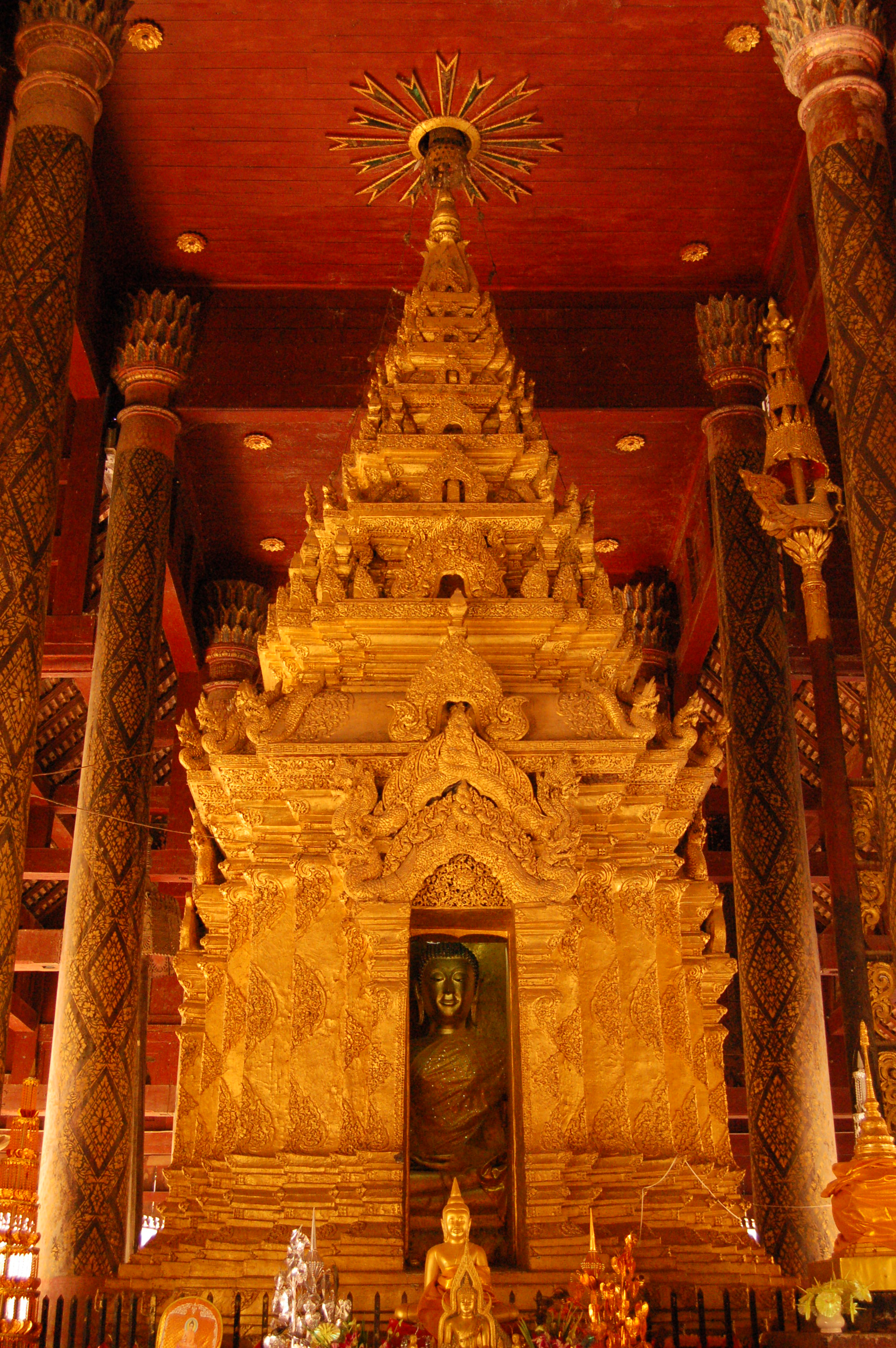
Phra Chao Lan Ton (Buddha Lan Ton) in the main prayer hall

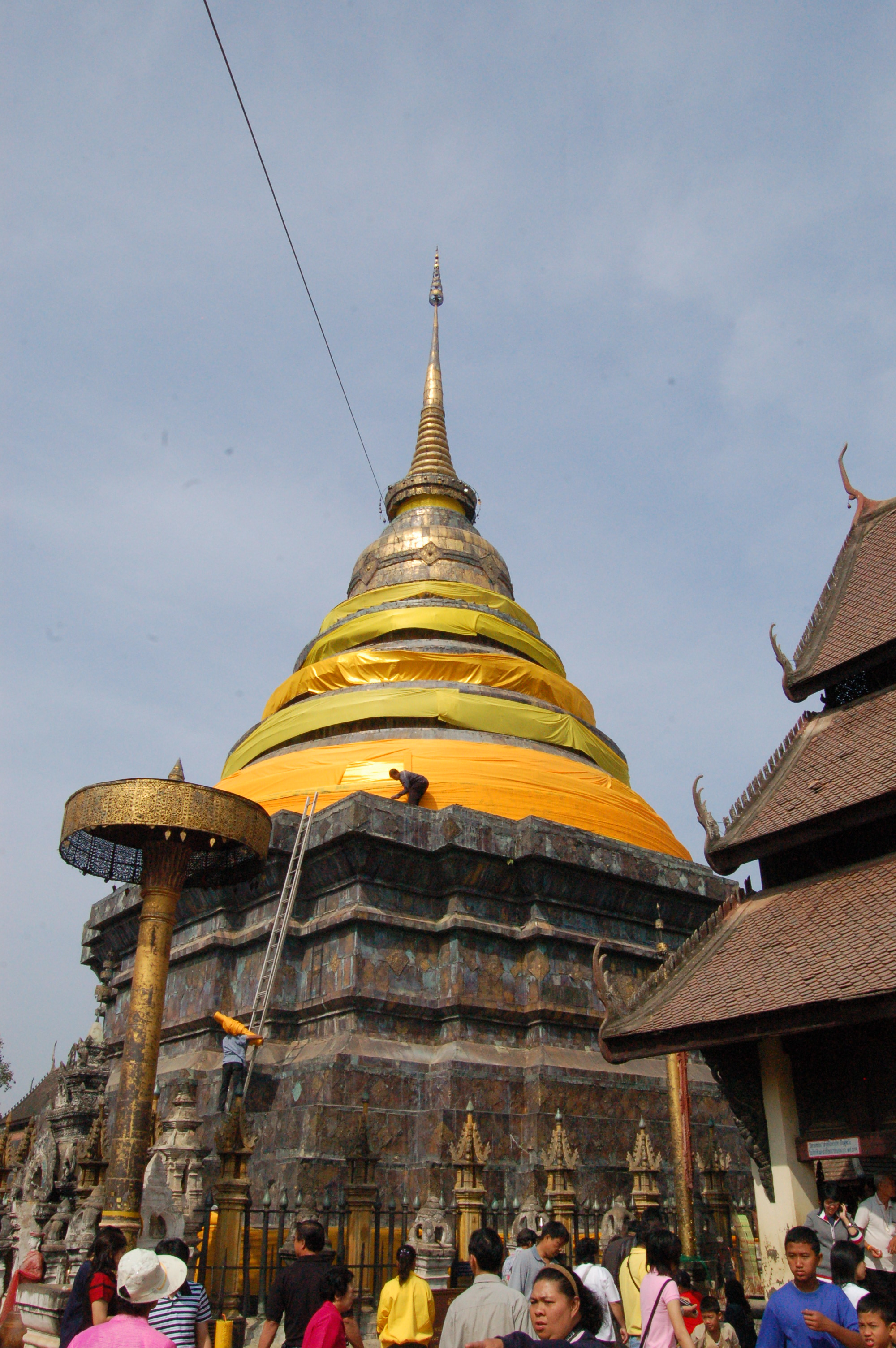
Chedi of Wat Phra That Lampang Luang

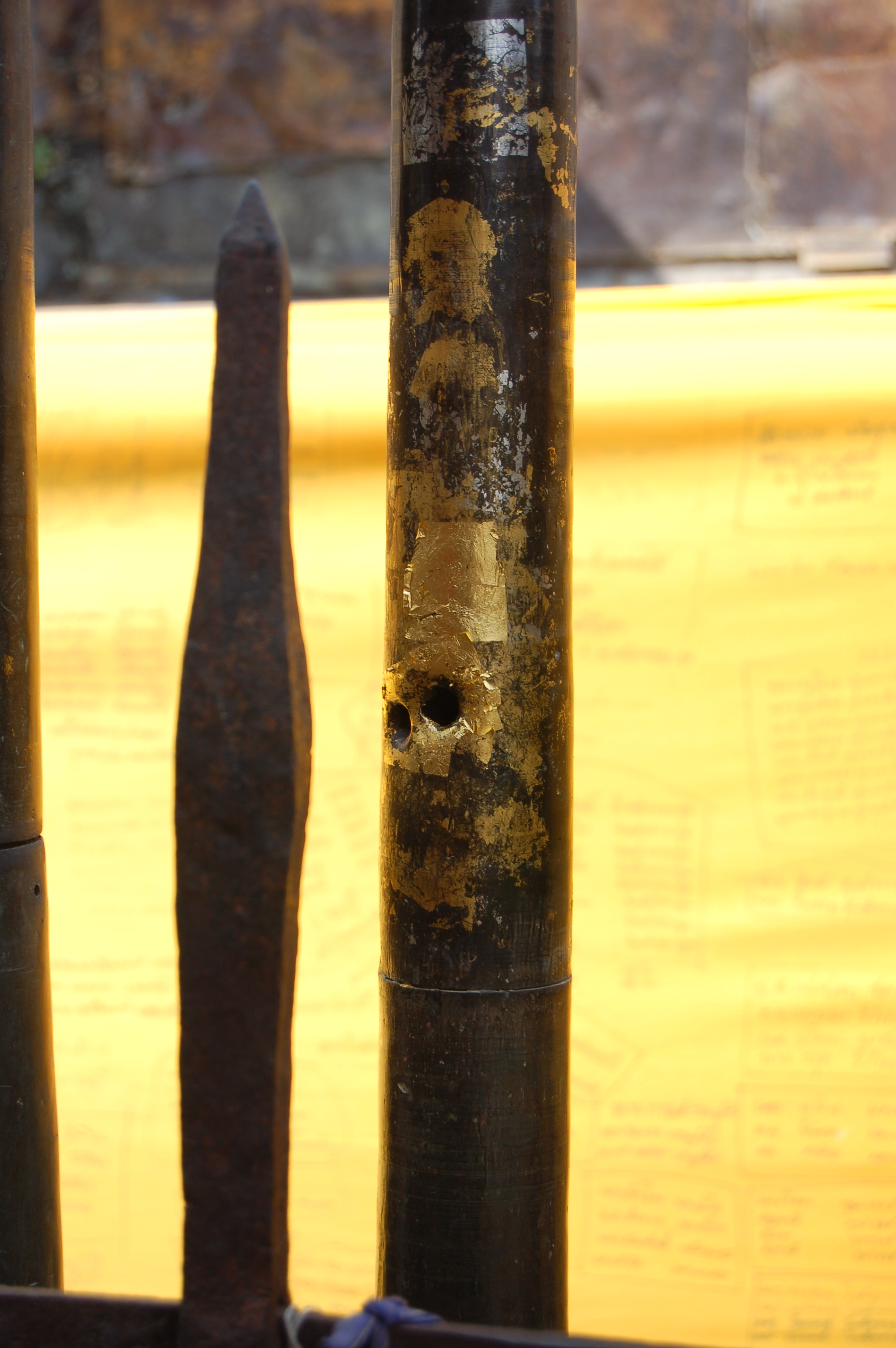
Bullet holes in Wat Phra That Lampang Luang railing

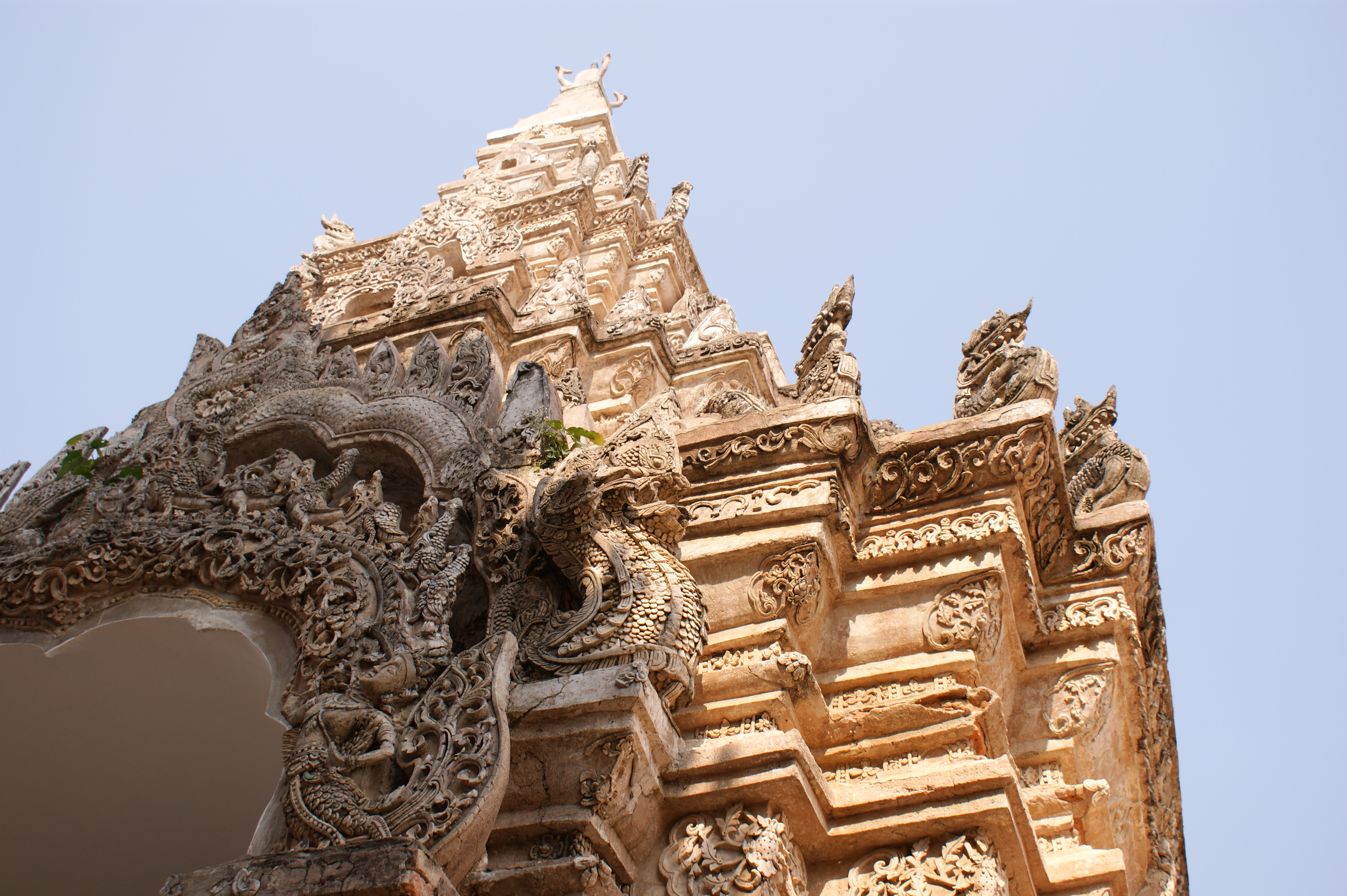
Detail of the entrance gate
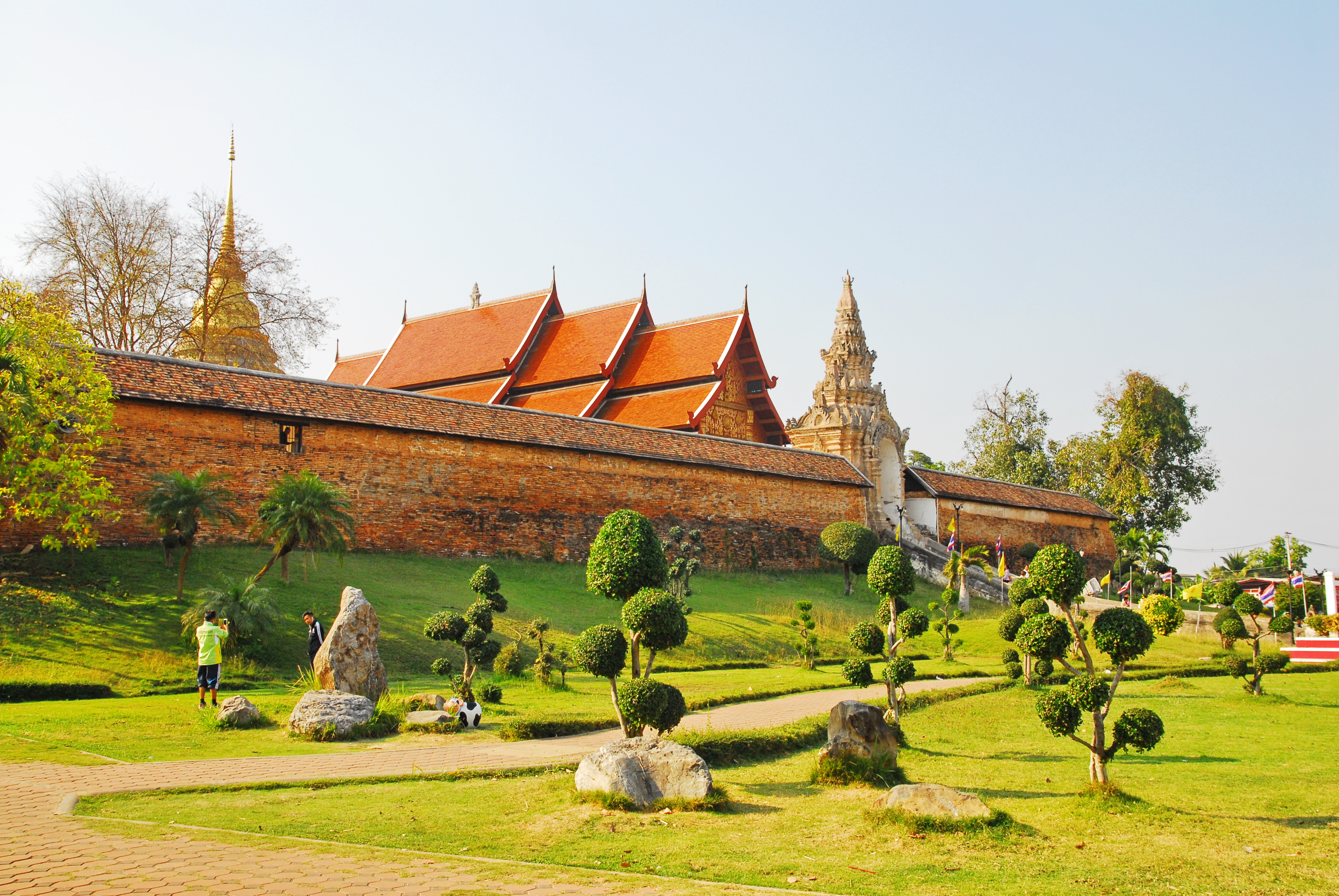
Wat Phra That Lampang Luang

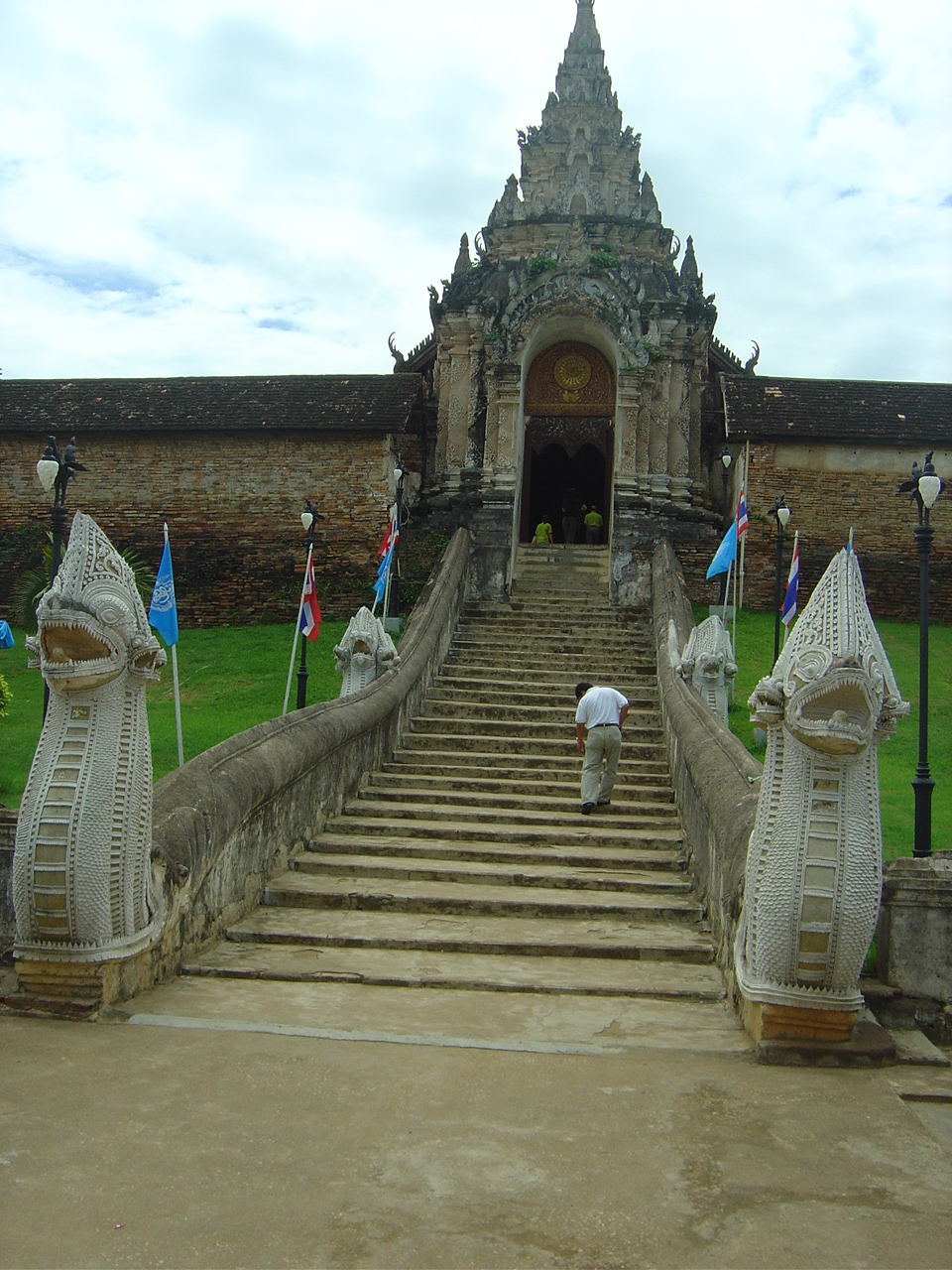
naka staircase, Wat Phra That Lampang Luang

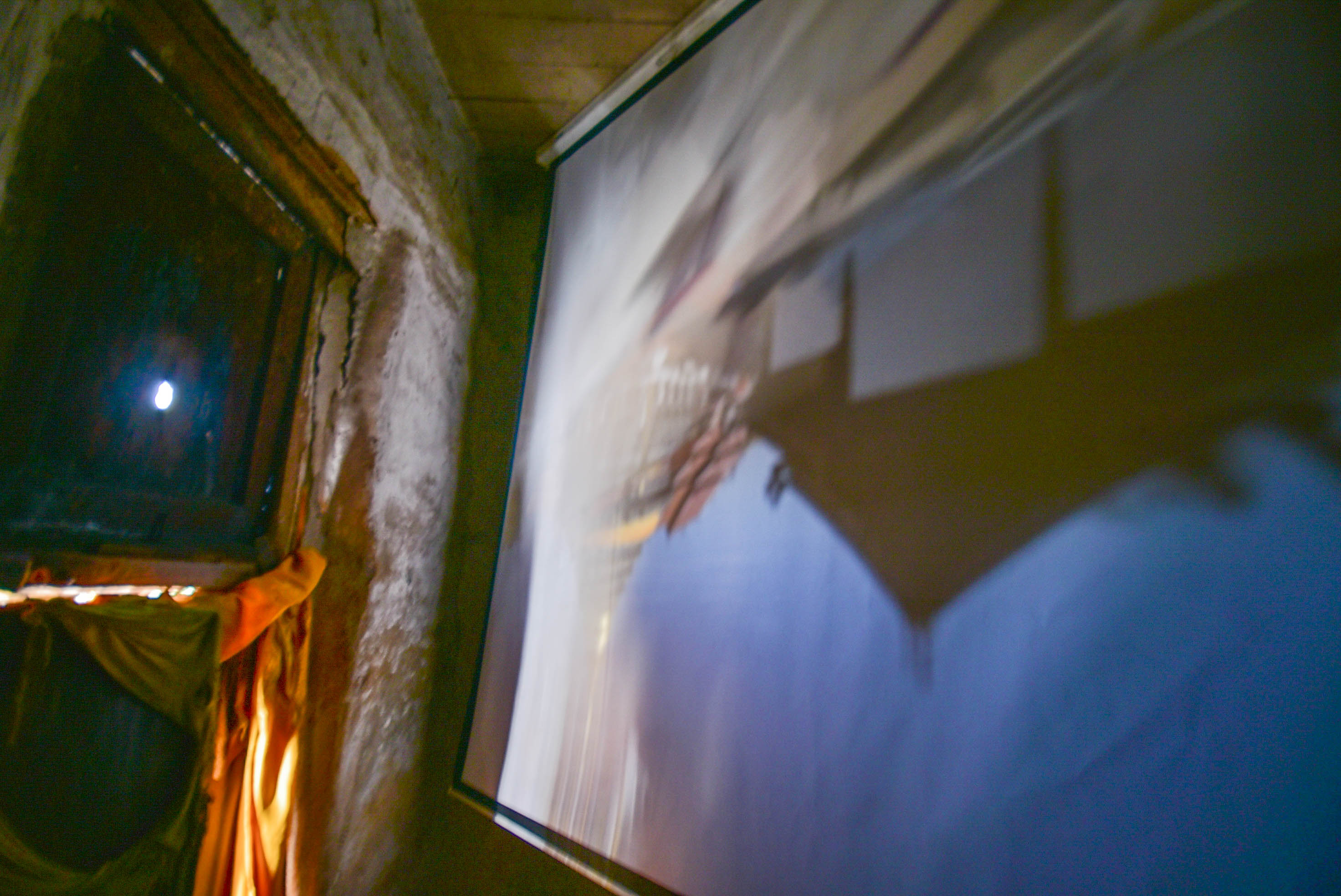
Upside down shade of Wat Phra That Lampang Luang

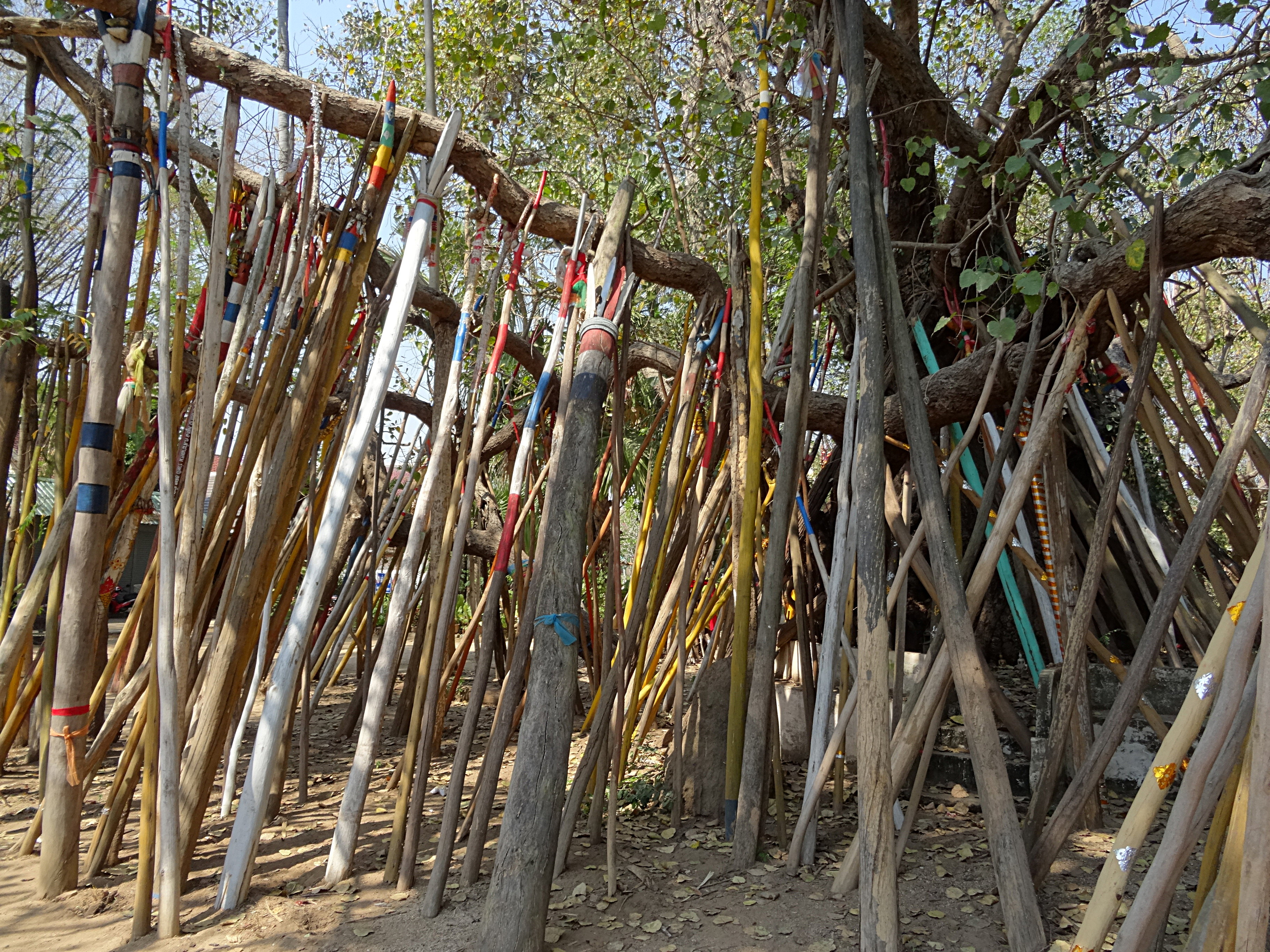
kaChao tree
