= Pha Chor =

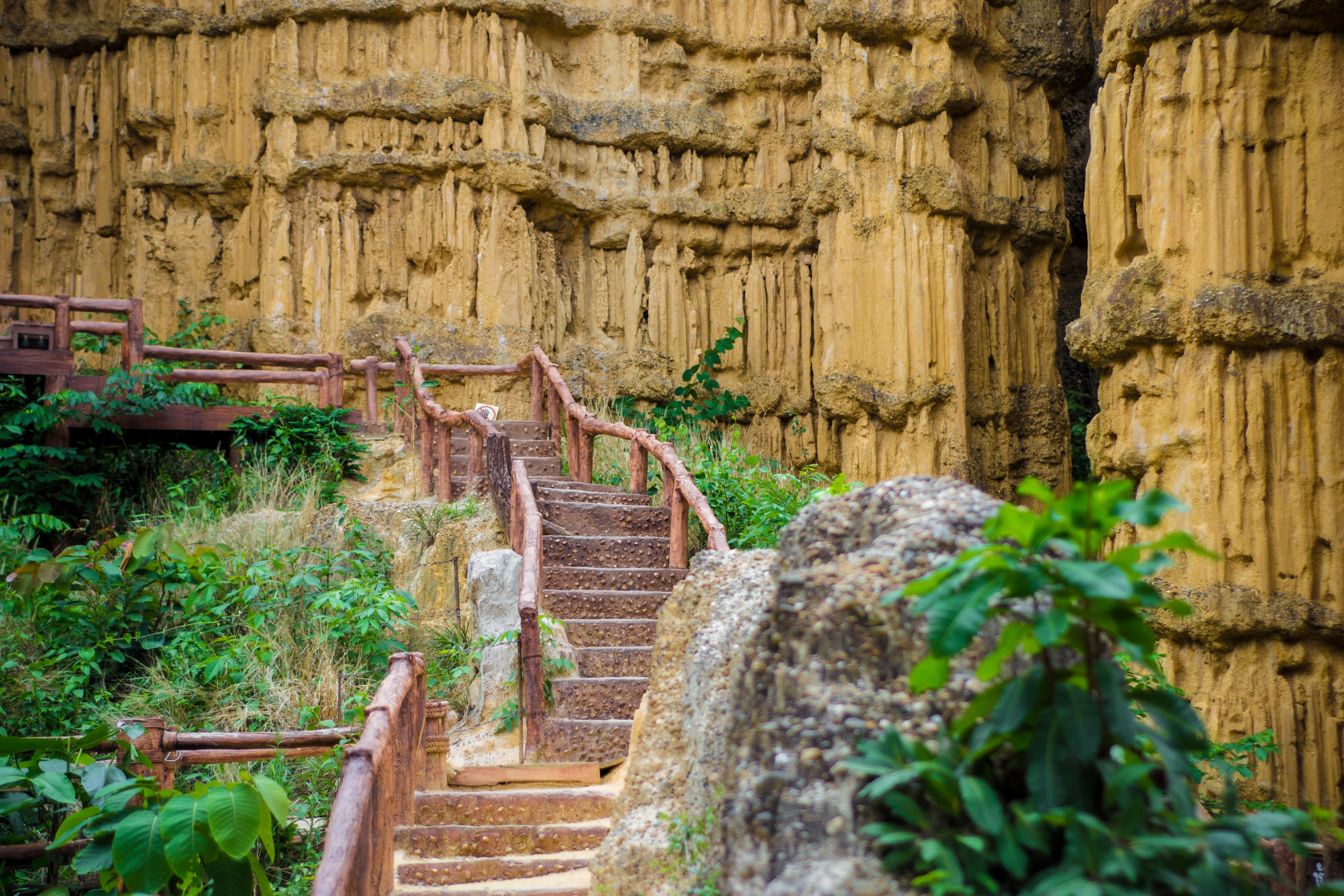
Pha chor, Chiang Mai, Thailand

Pha Chor (Thai: ผาช่อ, RTGS: Pha Cho) is a cliff located in Chiang Mai, Thailand, and is managed by Mae Wang National Park.

Pha Chor is a 30-meter-high (98 ft) cliff that has a structure like a huge monolithic wall or Roman pillar. The formation originated as sediment accumulated at the edge of the Thanon Thongchai Range during the late Tertiary period, which later experienced uplift and erosion, resulting in its current appearance.
