= Si Lanna National Park =

National park in Thailand

- อุทยานแห่งชาติศรีลานนา
- IUCN category II (national park)
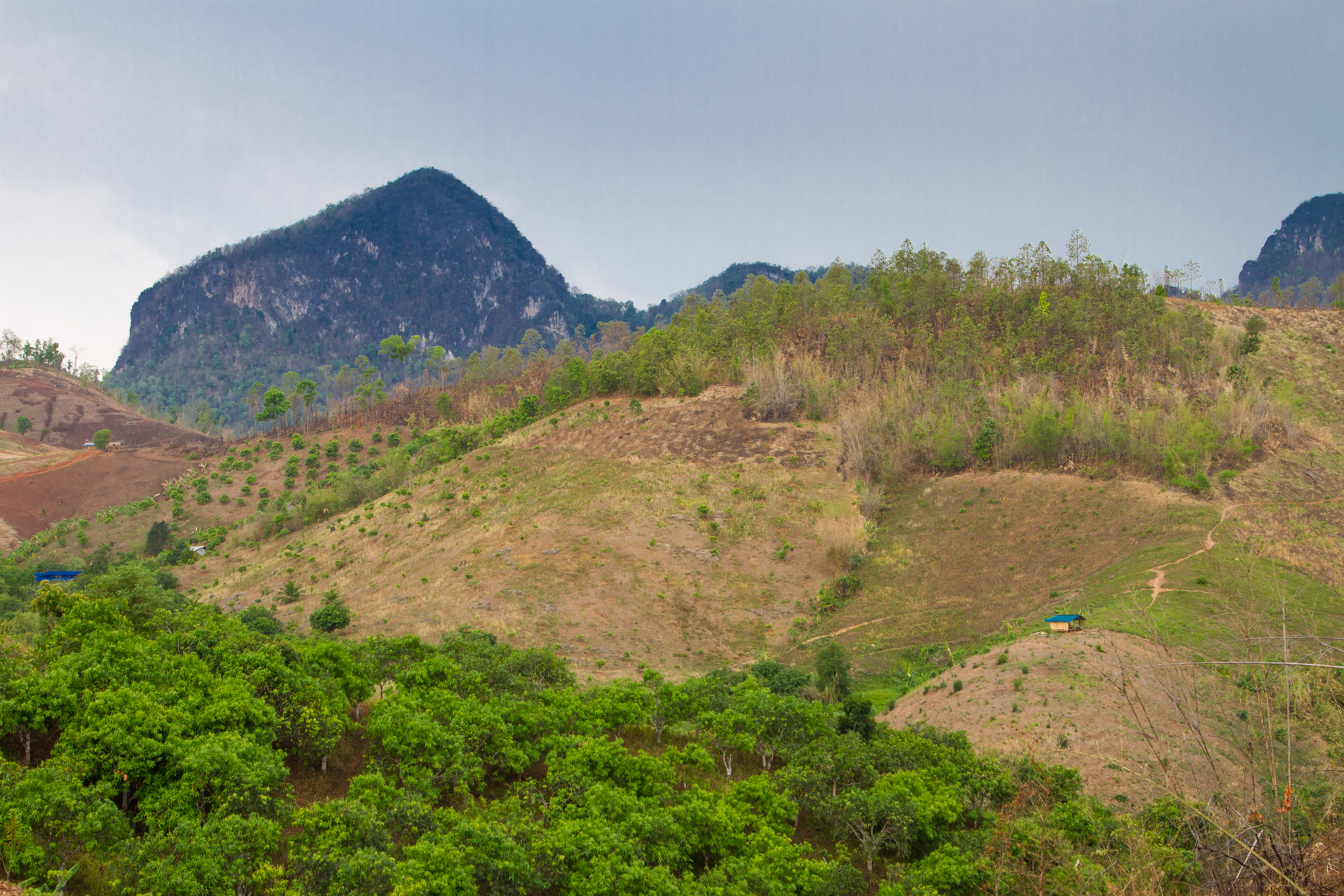

- Location within Thailand
- Location: Chiang Mai Province, Thailand
- Nearest city: Chiang Mai
- Coordinates: 19°16′56″N 99°5′28″E
- Area: 1,405 km^{2} (542 sq mi)
- Established: August 1989
- Visitors: 89,382 (in 2024)
- Governing body: Department of National Parks, Wildlife and Plant Conservation

Si Lanna National Park (Thai: อุทยานแห่งชาติศรีลานนา) is a national park in Chiang Mai Province, Thailand. Home to waterfalls, caves and springs, this mountainous park is the source of numerous tributaries of the Ping River.

== Geography ==
Si Lanna National Park is located about 65 kilometres (40 mi) north of Chiang Mai in Mae Taeng, Chiang Dao and Phrao districts. The park's area is 878,557 rai ~ 1,405 square kilometres (542 sq mi). The highest point is Doi Chom Hot peak at 1,718 metres (5,636 ft). The 16 km^{2} (6.2 sq mi) Mae Ngat Somboon Chon Reservoir lies within the park.

== History ==
On 1 August 1989, Si Lanna was designated Thailand's 60th National Park. This national park is home to hill tribes including Karen and Lahu.

== Attractions ==
Mon Hin Lai Waterfall is a nine-tiered waterfall located in the Mae Ngat Forest. Other waterfalls include Huai Mae Rangong and Huai Pa Phlu. The Nong Pha cave system features stalactites and stalagmites.

== Flora and fauna ==
The park's rugged terrain features numerous forest types: mixed deciduous, moist evergreen, hill evergreen and dipterocarp. Tree species include Tectona grandis, Pterocarpus macrocarpus, Dalbergia oliveri, Hopea odorata, Shorea obtusa, Dipterocarpus obtusifolius, Dipterocarpus tuberculatus, Irvingia malayana, Xylia xylocarpa, Cinnamomum iners, Toona ciliata, Lagerstroemia calyculata and Shorea siamensis.

Animal species include tiger, Asian black bear, sambar deer, northern red muntjac, macaque, Siamese hare and wild boar. Bird life includes coucal, bulbul, barbet, little egret and lesser whistling-duck.

== Location ==
Si Lanna National Park in overview PARO 16 (Chiang Mai)

15) Si Lanna National Park in overview PARO 16 (Chiang Mai)

	National park
1	Doi Inthanon
2	Doi Pha Hom Pok
3	Doi Suthep–Pui
4	Doi Wiang Pha
5	Huai Nam Dang
6	Khun Khan
7	Mae Ping
8	Mae Takhrai
9	Mae Tho
10	Mae Wang
11	Namtok Bua Tong– Namphu Chet Si
12	Op Khan
13	Op Luang
14	Pha Daeng
15	Si Lanna

	Wildlife sanctuary
16	Chiang Dao
17	Mae Lao–Mae Sae
18	Omkoi
19	Samoeng
	Non-hunting area
20	Doi Suthep
21	Mae Lao–Mae Sae
22	Nanthaburi
23	Pa Ban Hong
	Forest park
24	Doi Wiang Kaeo

== See also ==
- List of national parks of Thailand
- DNP - Si Lanna National Park
- List of Protected Areas Regional Offices of Thailand
