= Doi Wiang Pha National Park =

National park in Thailand

- อุทยานแห่งชาติดอยเวียงผา
- IUCN category II (national park)
- View from Mae Thalop Dam

- Location within Thailand
- Location: Tambon Si Dong Yen, Amphoe Chai Prakan, Chang Wat Chiang Mai 50320
- Coordinates: 19°40′39″N 99°11′54″E
- Area: 343.37 km^{2} (132.58 sq mi)
- Max. elevation: 1834 m
- Visitors: 939 (in 2024)
- Governing body: Department of National Parks, Wildlife and Plant Conservation (DNP)
- Website: https://portal.dnp.go.th/Content/nationalpark?contentId=34706

Doi Wiang Pha National Park (Thai: อุทยานแห่งชาติดอยเวียงผา, Uttayan Haeng Chat Doi Wiang Pha) is a protected area in northern Thailand, covering 583 squarekilometers across Chai Prakan and Fang Districts in Chiang Mai Province and Mae Suai District in Chiang Rai Province. It features rugged mountains, with Doi Wiang Pha Peak reaching 1,834 meters, and serves as a watershed for the Fang River and Lao River tributaries.The park contains diverse forests, supporting wildlife such as muntjacs, wild boars, and serows. Attractions include Huai Sai Khao Waterfall, Doi Wiang Pha Waterfall, and Doi Wiang Pha Viewpoint, offering panoramic views. Visitors can enjoy hiking, birdwatching, and sightseeing, especially during the cool season from November to February. The park is accessible via Highway No. 107 from Chiang Mai, with a 12-kilometer road leading to the entrance.It is managed by the Department of National Parks, Wildlife and Plant Conservation (กรมอุทยานแห่งชาติ สัตว์ป่า และพันธุ์พืช).

== Geography ==
Doi Wiang Pha National Park is known for its mountainous terrain, which features a complex system of ridges and valleys that run in a north-south direction, forming a natural boundary between Chiang Mai and Chiang Rai provinces. The park's highest peak, Doi Wiang Pha, rises to an elevation of 1,834 meters above sea level, offering panoramic views and supporting a diverse range of ecosystems.

The park functions as a critical watershed that supplies water to several major rivers and tributaries. It is the source of the Fang River and contributes to the Mae Lao River watershed, which includes streams such as Huai Mae Fang Luang, Huai Mae Fang Noi, and Nam Mae Yang Min. These water sources are crucial for supporting local communities, agriculture, and biodiversity in the region.

The park's elevation and varied topography lead to the development of unique ecosystems. At lower elevations, deciduous forests thrive, while evergreen forests dominate at higher altitudes. These differences in climate and elevation create habitats that support a diverse array of plant and animal species.

== Climate ==
Doi Wiang Pha National Park experiences a tropical monsoon climate, characterized by three distinct seasons throughout the year.

- Hot Season (March–April): During this time, temperatures rise significantly, with an average low of 11.8°C and a high of 36.3°C. Although the weather is warm, the park's high-altitude areas remain cooler, offering a refreshing escape for visitors.
- Rainy Season (May–October): The park receives significant rainfall, especially in August and September, when precipitation levels are at their highest. During this period, the lush greenery and cascading waterfalls create a stunning backdrop, making it an ideal time for visitors who appreciate nature and adventure tourism.
- Cool Season (November–February): This is the coolest time of the year, featuring crisp air and pleasant temperatures, making it the best period for tourism. The season is perfect for trekking, sightseeing, and wildlife observation, as the weather remains comfortable.

The variation in elevation across the park influences temperature fluctuations, making higher-altitude areas cooler year-round. Visitors are encouraged to check weather conditions before planning their trip, as different seasons offer unique experiences in the park.

== Flora ==
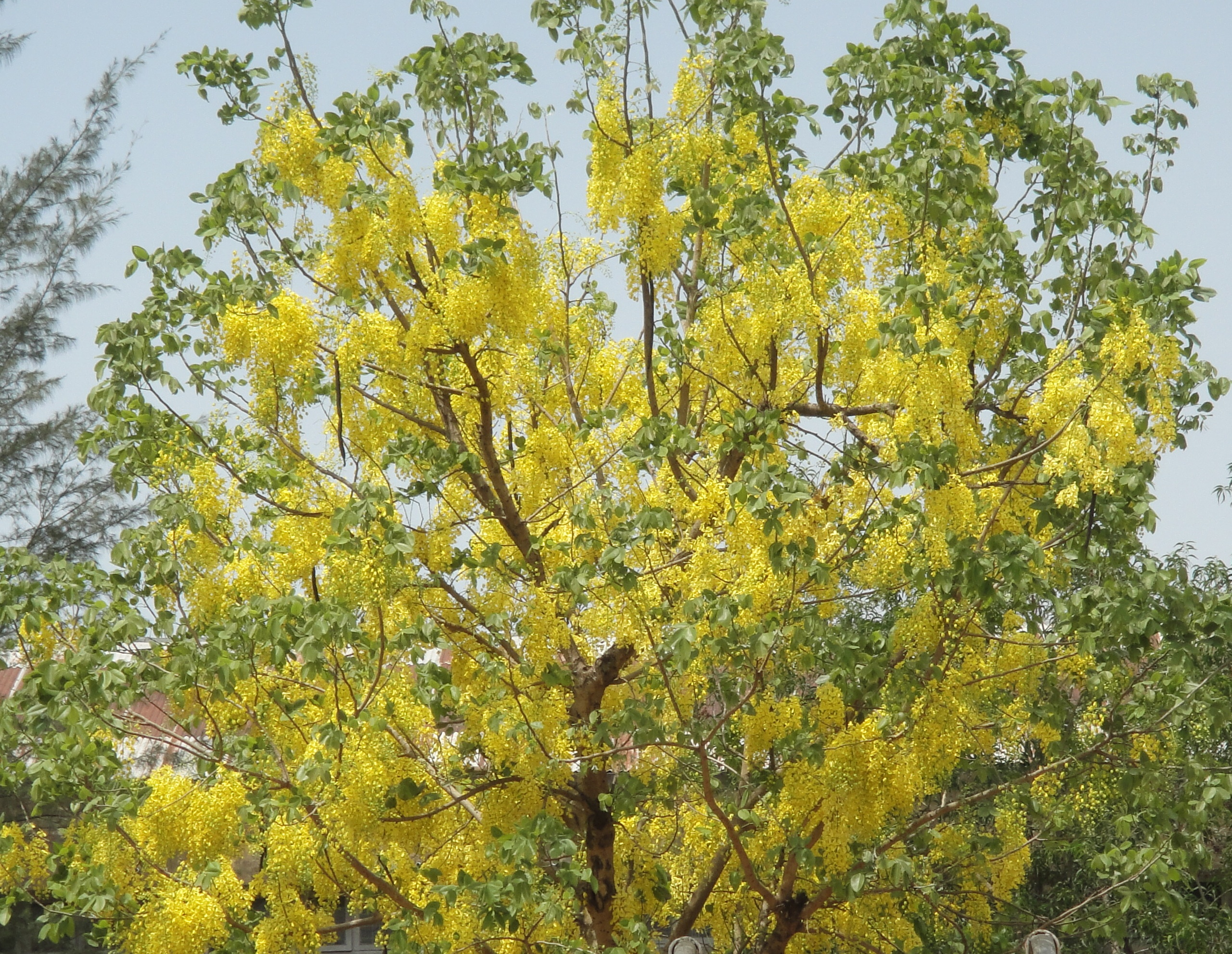
Burma Padauk (Pterocarpus macrocarpus)

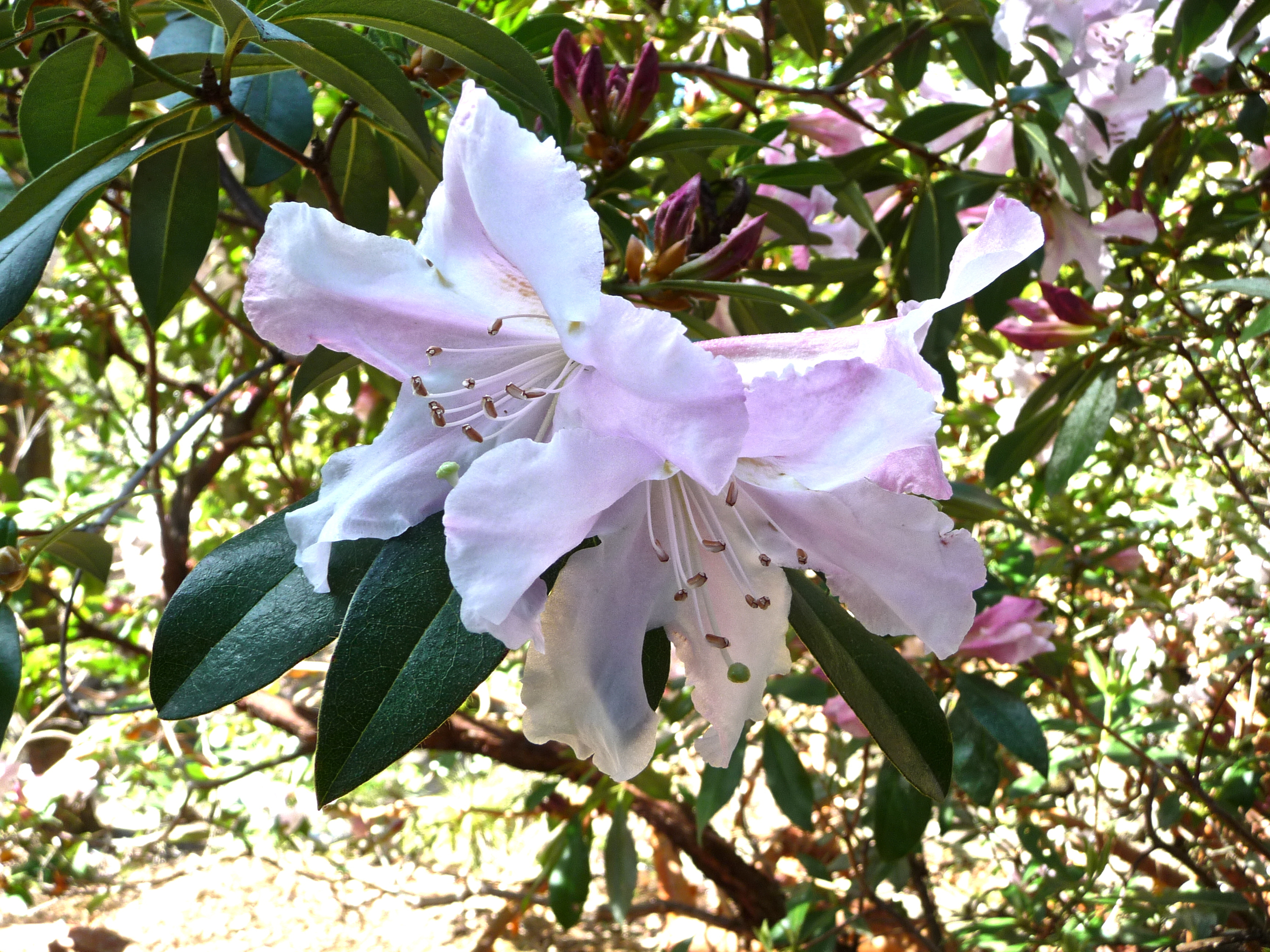
White Rose (Rhododendron veitchianum)

Doi Wiang Pha National Park is home to a diverse range of forest ecosystems, including mixed deciduous forest, hill evergreen forest, dry evergreen forest, deciduous dipterocarp forest, and pine forest. These forest types vary according to elevation and climatic conditions within the park.

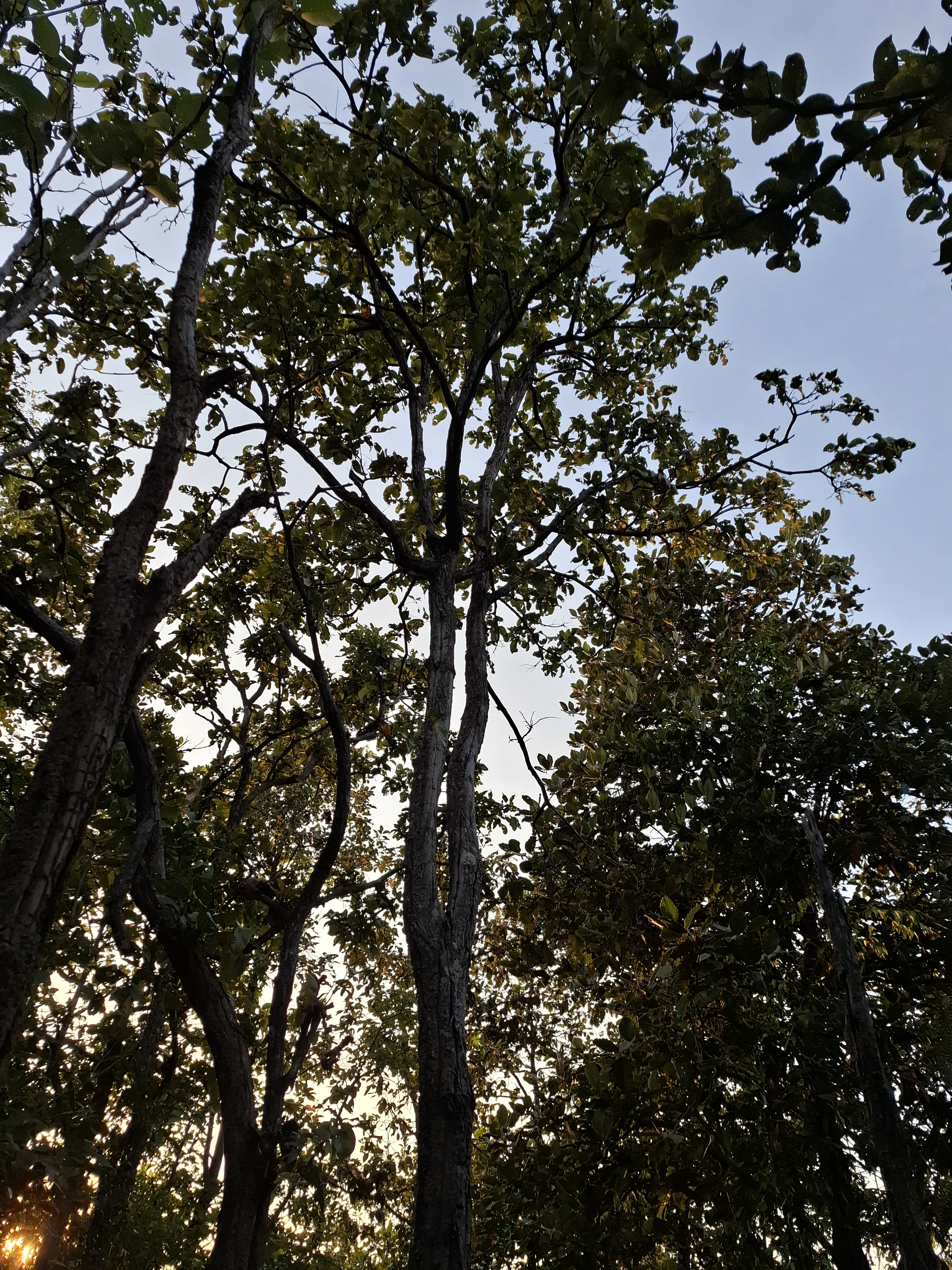
Burma Sal (Shorea obtusa)

=== Mixed Deciduous Forest ===
- Teak (Tectona grandis)
- Burma Padauk (Pterocarpus macrocarpus)
- Lagerstroemia (Lagerstroemia calyculata)

=== Hill Evergreen Forest ===
- Talauma hodgsonii
- White Rose (Rhododendron veitchianum)

=== Dry Evergreen Forest ===
- Champak (Michelia champaca)
- Dipterocarps (Dipterocarpus alatus)

=== Pine Forest ===
- Benguet pine (Pinus kesiya)
- Various oak species (Quercus spp.)

=== Deciduous Dipterocarp Forest ===
- Burma Sal (Shorea obtusa)
- Shorea siamensis

== Fauna ==
Doi Wiang Pha National Park is home to a diverse range of wildlife, including mammals, birds, and amphibians, which thrive within its varied ecosystems. The abundance of food sources and shelter provided by the park's mixed deciduous, evergreen, and dipterocarp forests support a wide variety of species.

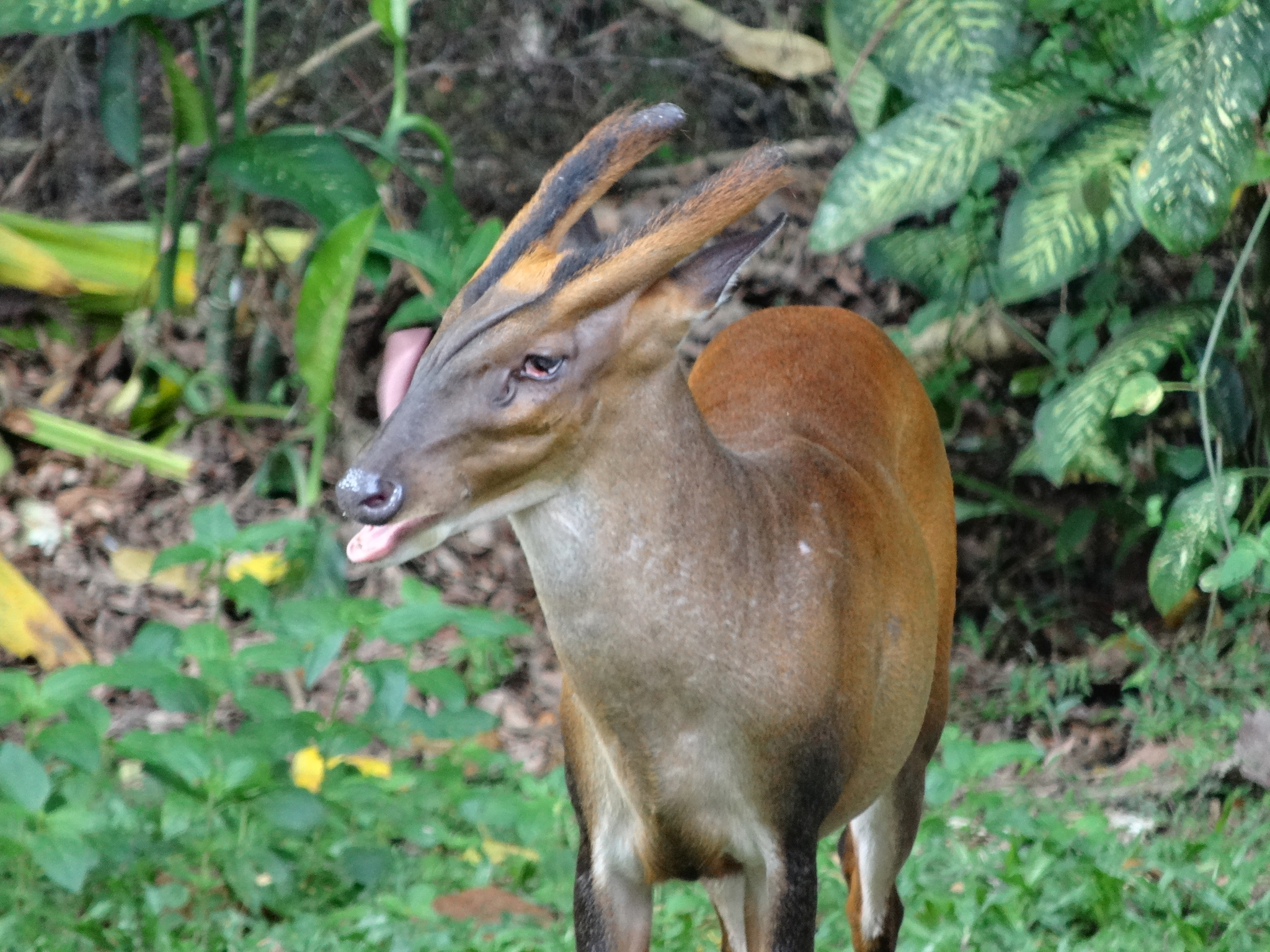
Common muntjac (Muntiacus muntjak)

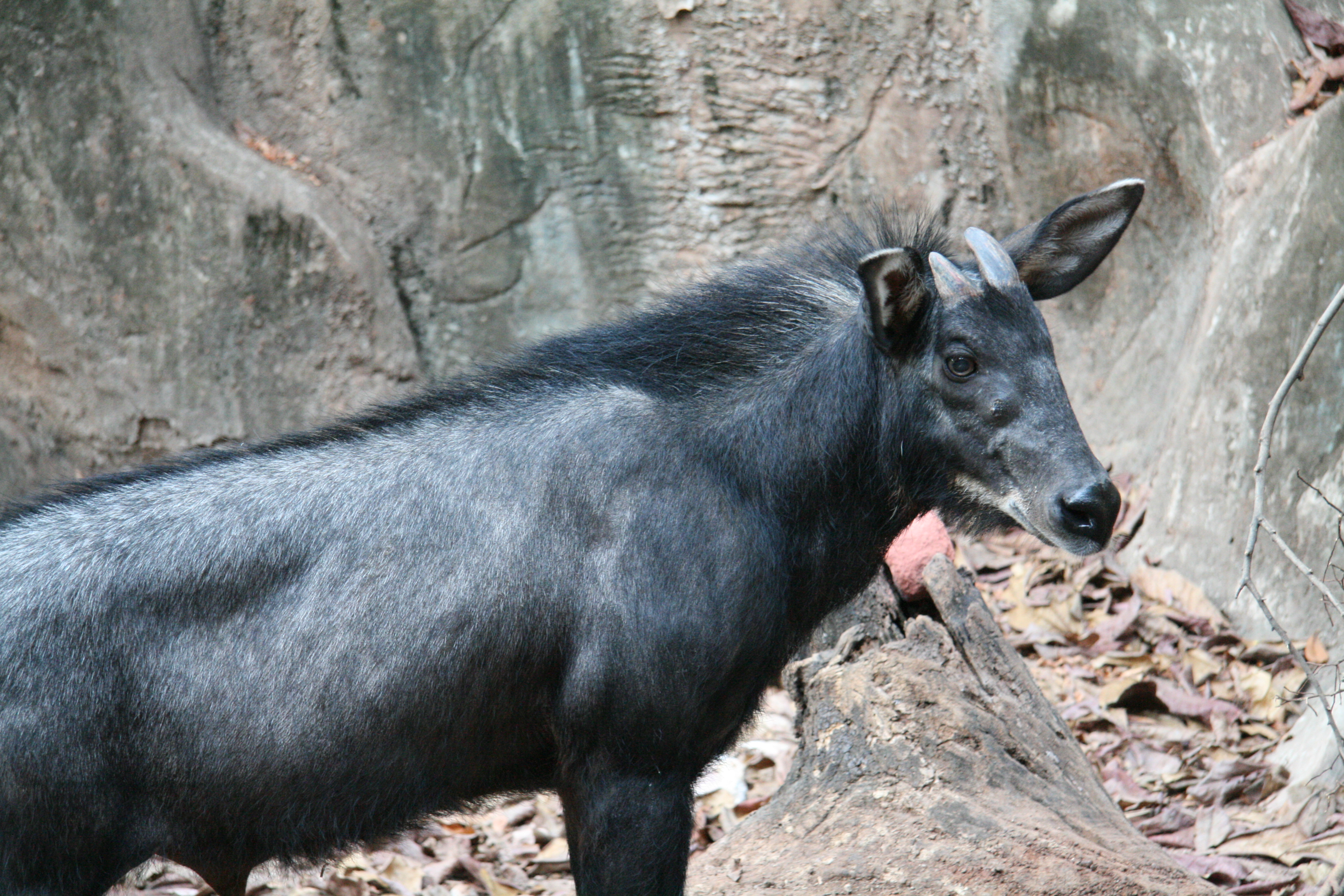
Serow (Capricornis sumatraensis)

=== Mammals ===
- Common muntjac (Muntiacus muntjak)
- Wild boar (Sus scrofa)
- Serow (Capricornis sumatraensis)
- Siamese hare (Lepus peguensis)
- Palm civet (Paradoxurus hermaphroditus)
- Macaques (Macaca spp.)
- Porcupines (Hystrix spp.)
- Squirrels and treeshrews

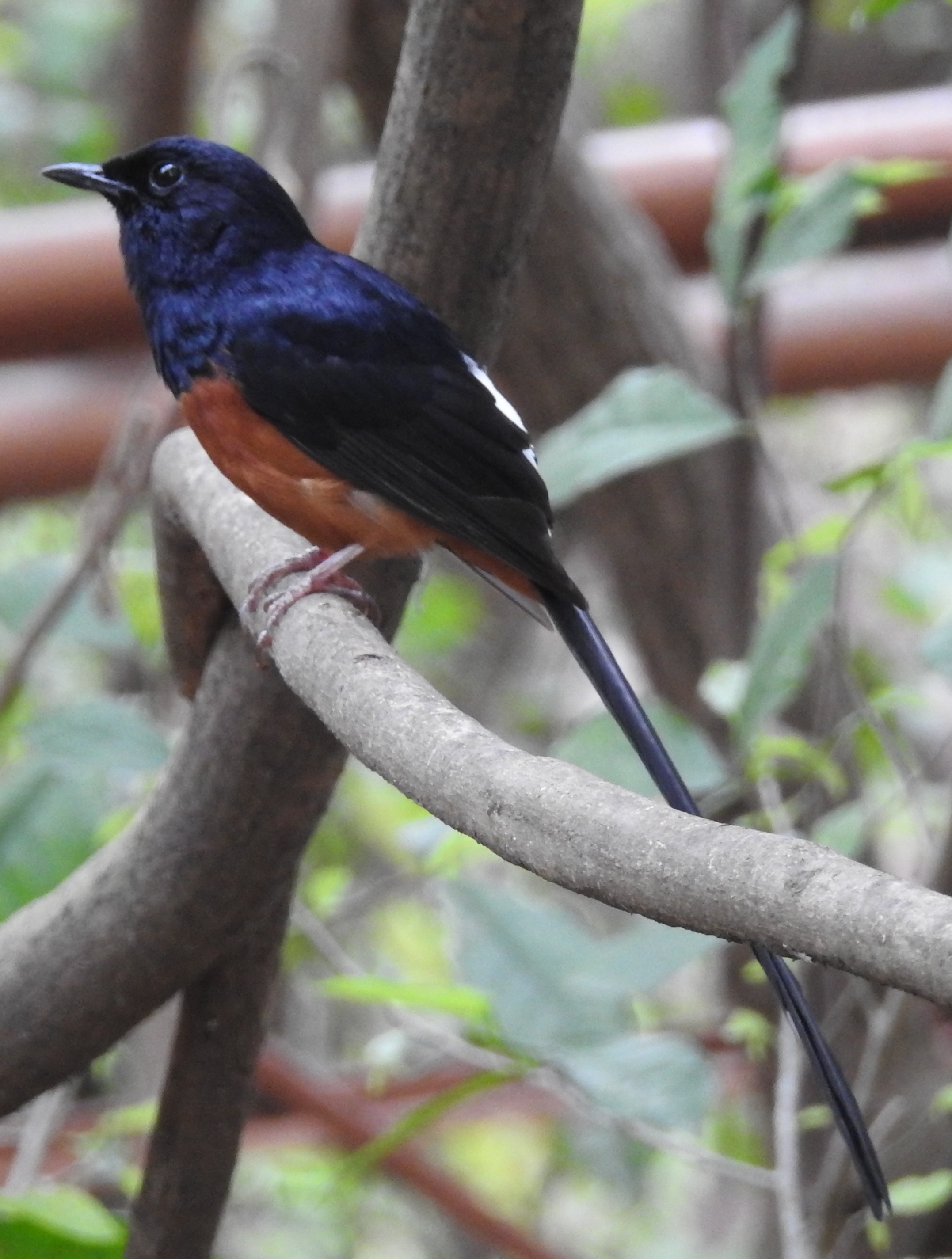
White-rumped shama (Copsychus malabaricus)

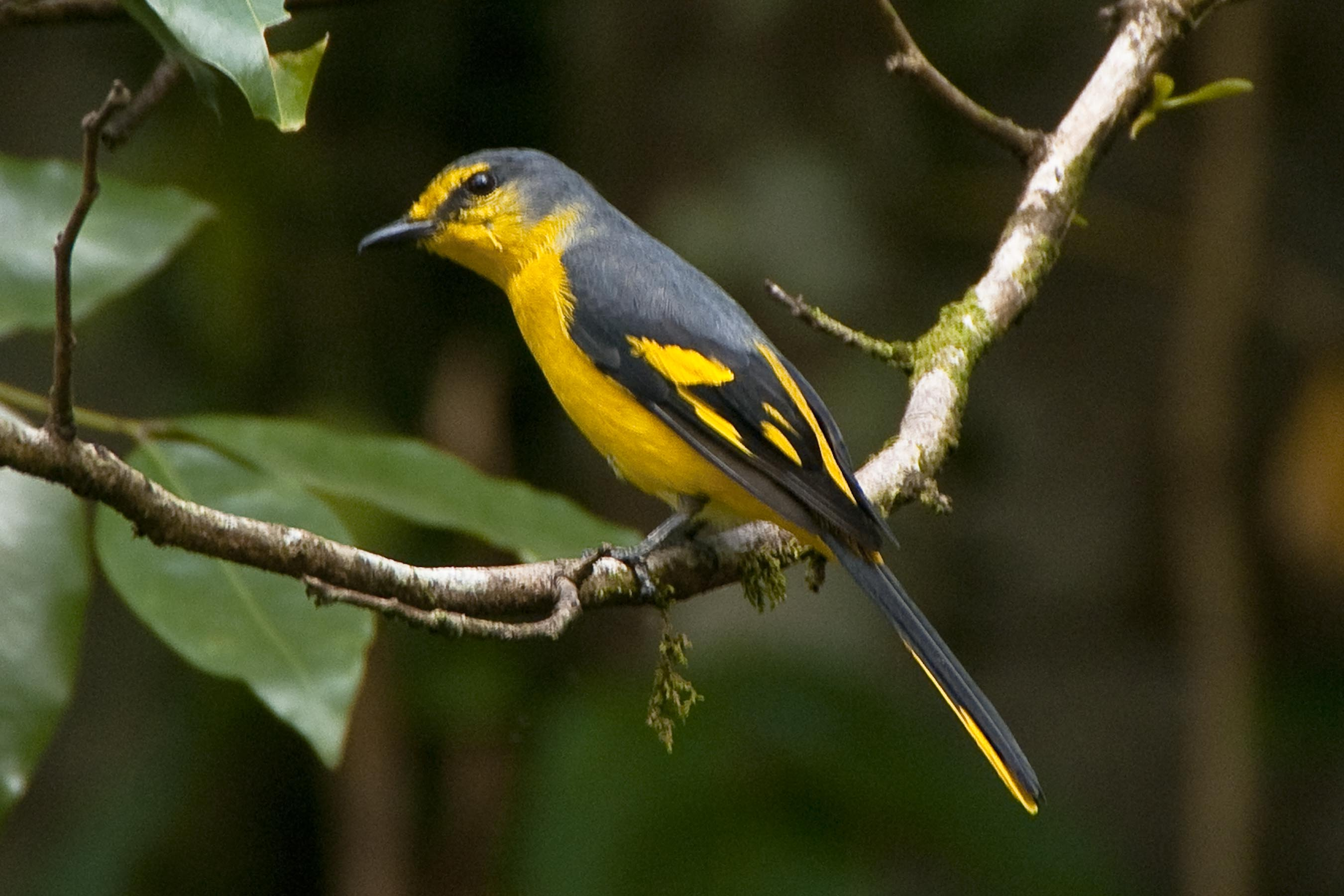
Scarlet minivet (Pericrocotus flammeus)

=== Birds ===
- White-rumped shama (Copsychus malabaricus)
- Red junglefowl (Gallus gallus)
- Scarlet minivet (Pericrocotus flammeus)
- Asian barbets (Megalaimidae)
- Sunbirds (Nectariniidae)
- Hawks (Accipitridae)
- Doves (Columbidae)
- Woodpeckers (Picidae)

=== Amphibians ===
- Salamanders (water lizards), which serve as indicators of a healthy and balanced ecosystem.

== Recreation ==
Doi Wiang Pha National Park offers a variety of recreational activities for visitors, including hiking, sightseeing, camping, and wildlife observation.

=== Hiking and Nature Trails ===
- Huai Sai Khao Waterfall Trail: A short 300-meter trail from the National Park Office leads to the Huai Sai Khao Waterfall, a three-level cascade originating from the Huai Sai Khao stream.
- Doi Wiang Pha Summit Trail: This trail takes visitors to the park's highest peak, Doi Wiang Pha, standing at 1,834 meters above sea level, offering panoramic mountain views.

=== Waterfall Exploration ===
- Huai Sai Khao Waterfall: A small, scenic waterfall located only 300 meters from the National Park Office. This three-level waterfall is easily accessible.
- Doi Wiang Pha Waterfall: This medium-sized waterfall stands 18 meters high and is located 8 kilometers from the park office.
- Mae Fang Luang Waterfall: A 10-meter-high waterfall surrounded by lush forest, offering a tranquil setting for visitors.

=== Scenic Viewpoints ===
- Doi Wiang Pha Viewpoint: This popular viewpoint offers spectacular natural scenery, making it ideal for sunrise and sunset photography.

=== Wildlife and Bird Watching ===
The park is home to diverse wildlife, including small and medium-sized mammals such as squirrels, wild boars, palm civets, and serows. Birdwatchers can spot white-rumped shamas, hawks, doves, red junglefowl, sunbirds, and Asian barbets.

=== Camping ===
Camping facilities are available near the park headquarters, allowing visitors to enjoy the serene atmosphere overnight. The area offers basic amenities and serves as a starting point for many trails. Visitors can bring their own gear and confirm availability with park staff.

== Transportation ==
From Chiang Mai, travelers can take Highway No. 107 north toward Fang District, covering a distance of approximately 125 kilometers. The entrance to the park is located about 2 kilometers before Chai Prakan District. A notable landmark is Sridongyen Community School, situated on the left-hand side of the road, with the park entrance directly opposite on the right-hand side. From there, visitors must drive an additional 12 kilometers to reach the park headquarters.

For those using public transportation, regular Chiang Mai–Fang buses depart from Chang Phueak Bus Terminal every 30 minutes. Passengers should disembark at Ban Tha Market (ตลาดบ้านท่า) in Chai Prakan District and hire a local vehicle (songthaew or private taxi) for the final 12-kilometer journey to the national park.

Visitors traveling from Bangkok can take an air-conditioned intercity bus on the Bangkok–Chiang Mai route, with departures from the Mo Chit Northern Bus Terminal (Kamphaeng Phet 2 Road). The journey takes approximately 10 hours. Upon arrival in Chiang Mai, travelers must transfer to a Chiang Mai–Fang bus to complete their journey to the park.

== Location ==
Doi Wiang Pha National Park in overview PARO 16 (Chiang Mai)

4) Doi Wiang Pha National Park in overview PARO 16

	National park
1	Doi Inthanon
2	Doi Pha Hom Pok
3	Doi Suthep–Pui
4	Doi Wiang Pha
5	Huai Nam Dang
6	Khun Khan
7	Mae Ping
8	Mae Takhrai
9	Mae Tho
10	Mae Wang
11	Namtok Bua Tong– Namphu Chet Si
12	Op Khan
13	Op Luang
14	Pha Daeng
15	Si Lanna

	Wildlife sanctuary
16	Chiang Dao
17	Mae Lao–Mae Sae
18	Omkoi
19	Samoeng
	Non-hunting area
20	Doi Suthep
21	Mae Lao–Mae Sae
22	Nanthaburi
23	Pa Ban Hong
	Forest park
24	Doi Wiang Kaeo

== See also ==
- List of national parks of Thailand
- List of Protected Areas Regional Offices of Thailand
