= Micythus anopsis =

Scientific classification
- Kingdom: Animalia
- Phylum: Arthropoda
- Subphylum: Chelicerata
- Class: Arachnida
- Order: Araneae
- Infraorder: Araneomorphae
- Family: Gnaphosidae
- Genus: Micythus
- Species: M. anopsis

Binomial name
- Micythus anopsis Deeleman-Reinhold, 2001

Species of spider

Micythus anopsis is a species of ground spider found in a cave in Northern Thailand. Unlike the other two members of the genus Micythus, Micythus anopsis (from Greek; sightless) completely lacks eyes. The holotype specimen was a female found in a limestone cave in Chiang Dao national park and thus likely represents an example of troglofauna. The cephalothorax, chelicerae, and legs are bright orange, and the abdomen is white with a total body length of 6.7 mm.
