= Tham Luang (disambiguation) =

Tham Luang (Thai: ถ้ำหลวง, lit. 'great cave') may refer to:

- Tham Luang Nang Non, a cave in the area of Doi Nang Non, Chiang Rai Province, Thailand
- Tham Luang Chiang Dao, a cave in the area of Doi Chiang Dao, Chiang Mai Province, Thailand
- Tham Luang Mae Sap, a cave in Khun Khan National Park, Chiang Mai Province, Thailand
- Tham Luang Pha Wiang, a cave in Ban Hong District, Lamphun Province, Thailand

== See also ==
- Tham Luang cave rescue, 2018 event at Tham Luang Nang Non
