= Op Khan National Park =

National park in Thailand

- อุทยานแห่งชาติออบขาน
- IUCN category II (national park)
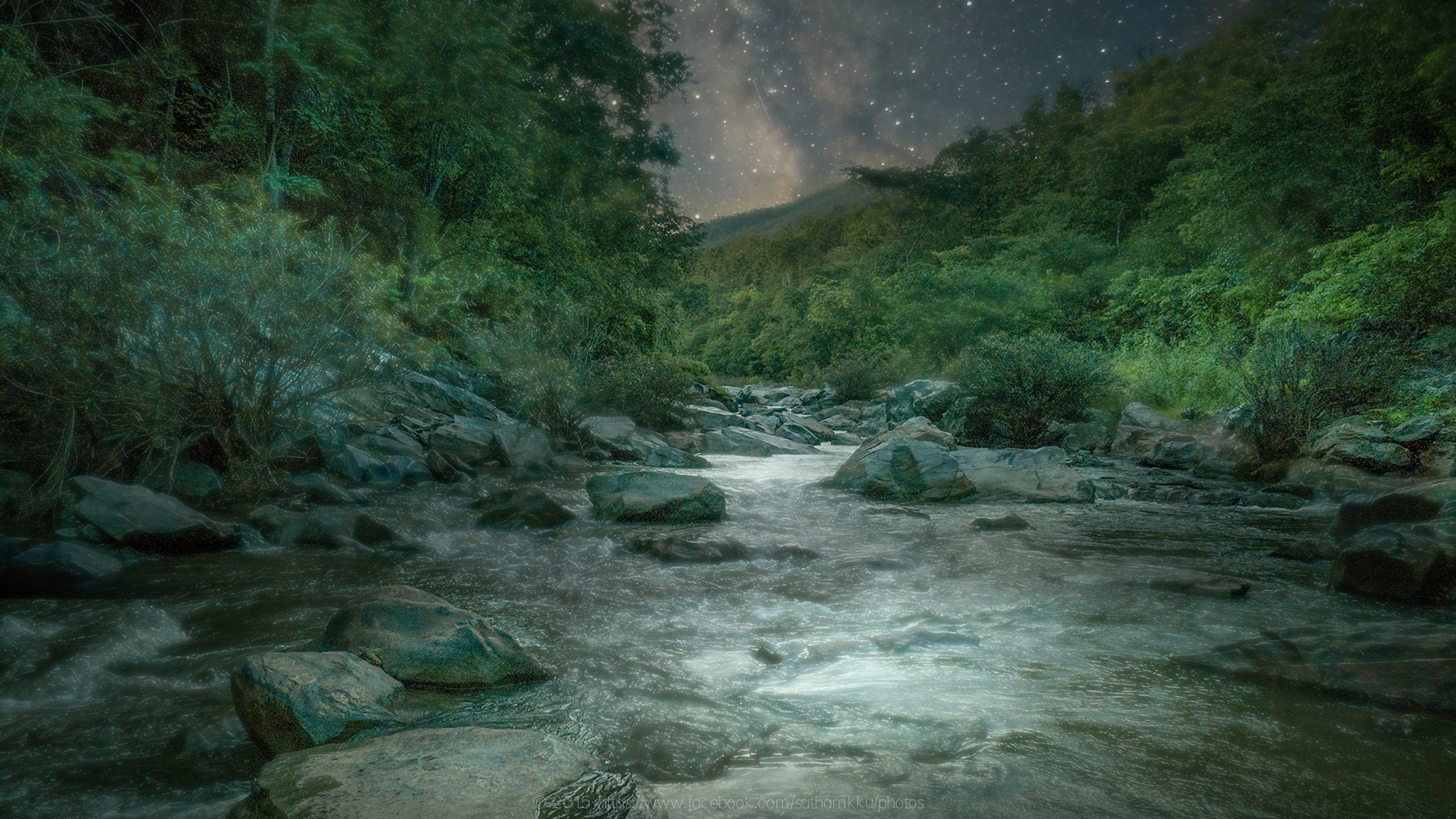
- Op Khan National Park at nighttime
- Interactive map of Op Khan National Park
- Location: Chiang Mai Province, Thailand
- Nearest city: Chiang Mai
- Coordinates: 18°43′22″N 98°49′20″E
- Area: 227 km^{2} (88 sq mi)
- Established: 1992
- Visitors: 98,972 (in 2024)
- Governing body: Department of National Park, Wildlife and Plant Conservation (DNP)

Op Khan National Park (or Ob Khan National Park; Thai: อุทยานแห่งชาติออบขาน) is a national park in Chiang Mai Province in Thailand.

== History ==
Op Khan National Park (preparation) was officially established in 1992.

== Geography ==
The park spans the districts of Samoeng, San Pa Tong, Hang Dong, and Mae Wang. It is adjacent to Doi Suthep–Pui National Park to the east, and Mae Wang National Park and Doi Inthanon National Park to the southwest. It occupies 141,756 rai ~ 227 square kilometres (88 sq mi). The park headquarters is located in Hang Dong district.

Khun Tian (ขุนเตียน) is the highest point at 1,550 metres above sea level. The mountains in the park form part of the Thanon Thong Chai Range.

Villages located within the park boundaries include the Hmong village of Ban Huai Siew (บ้านห้วยเสี้ยว).

== Flora and fauna ==
Trees include Irvingia malayana, Anisoptera costata, Tectona grandis, Lagerstroemia calyculata, and Schleichera oleosa, while wildlife includes mainland serows, common muntjac, fishing cats, mouse deer, Asian palm civets, mongoose, porcupines, and others.

Notable caves include Grasshopper Cave (ถ้ำตั๊กแตน).

== Location ==
Op Khan National Park in overview PARO 16 (Chiang Mai)

12) Op Khan National Park in overview PARO 16 (Chiang Mai)

	National park
1	Doi Inthanon
2	Doi Pha Hom Pok
3	Doi Suthep–Pui
4	Doi Wiang Pha
5	Huai Nam Dang
6	Khun Khan
7	Mae Ping
8	Mae Takhrai
9	Mae Tho
10	Mae Wang
11	Namtok Bua Tong– Namphu Chet Si
12	Op Khan
13	Op Luang
14	Pha Daeng
15	Si Lanna

	Wildlife sanctuary
16	Chiang Dao
17	Mae Lao–Mae Sae
18	Omkoi
19	Samoeng
	Non-hunting area
20	Doi Suthep
21	Mae Lao–Mae Sae
22	Nanthaburi
23	Pa Ban Hong
	Forest park
24	Doi Wiang Kaeo

== See also ==
- List of national parks of Thailand
- DNP - Op Khan National Park
- List of Protected Areas Regional Offices of Thailand
