= Doi Pha Hom Pok National Park =

National park in Thailand

- อุทยานแห่งชาติดอยผ้าห่มปก
- IUCN category II (national park)
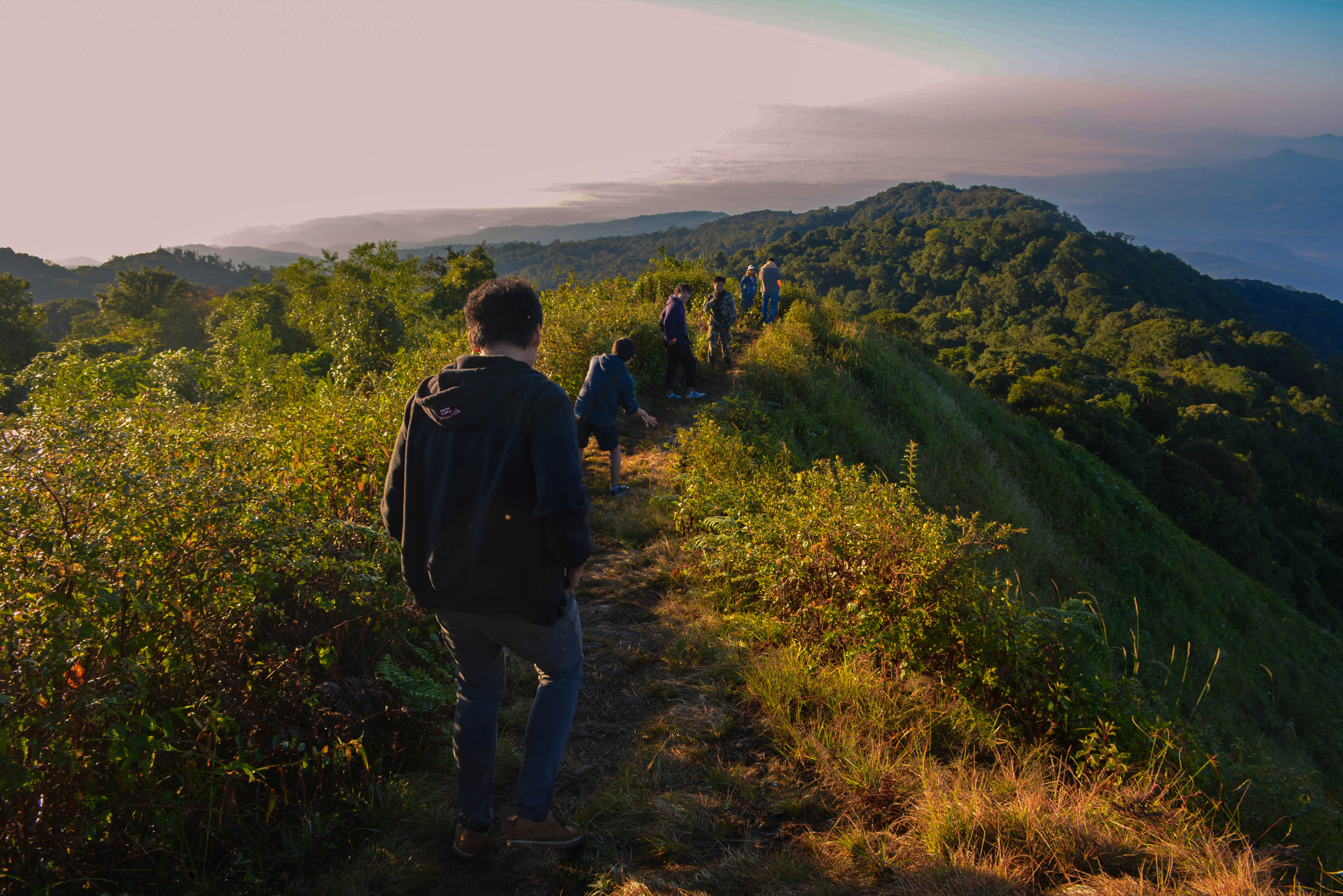
- The summit of Doi Pha Hom Pok

- Location within Thailand
- Location: Chiang Mai province, Thailand
- Nearest city: Fang, Chiang Mai province
- Coordinates: 19°59′16″N 99°08′47″E
- Area: 524 km^{2} (202 sq mi)
- Established: 4 September 2000
- Visitors: 70,129 (in 2019)
- Governing body: Department of National Parks, Wildlife and Plant Conservation

Doi Pha Hom Pok National Park (Thai: อุทยานแห่งชาติดอยผ้าห่มปก), formerly known as Mae Fang National Park and Doi Fa Hom Pok National Park, is the northernmost national park in Thailand. It straddles Fang, Mae Ai, and Chai Prakan Districts of Chiang Mai Province. The park covers 327,500 rai, about 524 square kilometres (202 sq mi) of the mountain area of the Daen Lao Range, at the border with Myanmar. The tallest peak is Doi Pha Hom Pok at 2,285 metres (7,497 ft), the second highest in Thailand.

Doi Pha Hom Pok National Park is mostly covered with forest, where tree species such as Hopea odorata predominate with rare plant species such as Impatiens jurpioides and butterflies such as Teinopalpus imperialis and Meandrusa lachinus. Doi Lang, located within the park, is an excellent area for birdwatching. There are many hot mineral springs near the park headquarters in an area of 10 rai (16,000 m^{2}). Water temperature ranges from 90 to 130 °C. The largest pond has hot steam rising 40–50 metres above the ground.

== History ==
Doi Pha Hom Pok National Park was established in 1968 and designated as Thailand's 97th national park, situated in Chiang Mai Province in northern Thailand. The original designation of the park is “Mae Fang National Park”, as it encompasses three districts of Fang Basin National Reserved Forest in Chiang Mai Province, namely Mae Ai, Fang, and Chaiprakarn District. The park spans approximately 524 square kilometers (202.318 square miles). The summit of Doi Pha Hom Pok mountain attains an elevation of 2,285 meters above sea level, rendering it the second-highest peak in Thailand. Then later, on March 14, 2006, “Mae Fang National Park” changed its name to “Doi Pha Hom Phok” the exact name as a famous tourist attraction of the park. And the name is still the same to this date

The establishment of the national park was declared the 97th national park in the Royal Gazette on 4 September 2000.

== Flora and Fauna ==
Doi Pha Hom Pok National Park is a prominent biodiversity hotspot in Northern Thailand, notable for housing the country's second-highest peak (Doi Pha Hom Pok, 2,285 m). Its flora and fauna show a significant mix of tropical and Sino-Himalayan influences.

=== Flora ===
The park's high elevation supports three main forest types: Hill Evergreen Forest (or Cloud Forest) at the summit, Coniferous Forest (pines) on ridges, and Mixed Deciduous Forest at lower elevations.

- Key Species: Notable flora includes the Wild Himalayan Cherry (a seasonal highlight), the birch Betula alnoides, and rare summit-dwelling species such as Impatiens jurpioides and a local Rhododendron known as "Kulap Fi”.
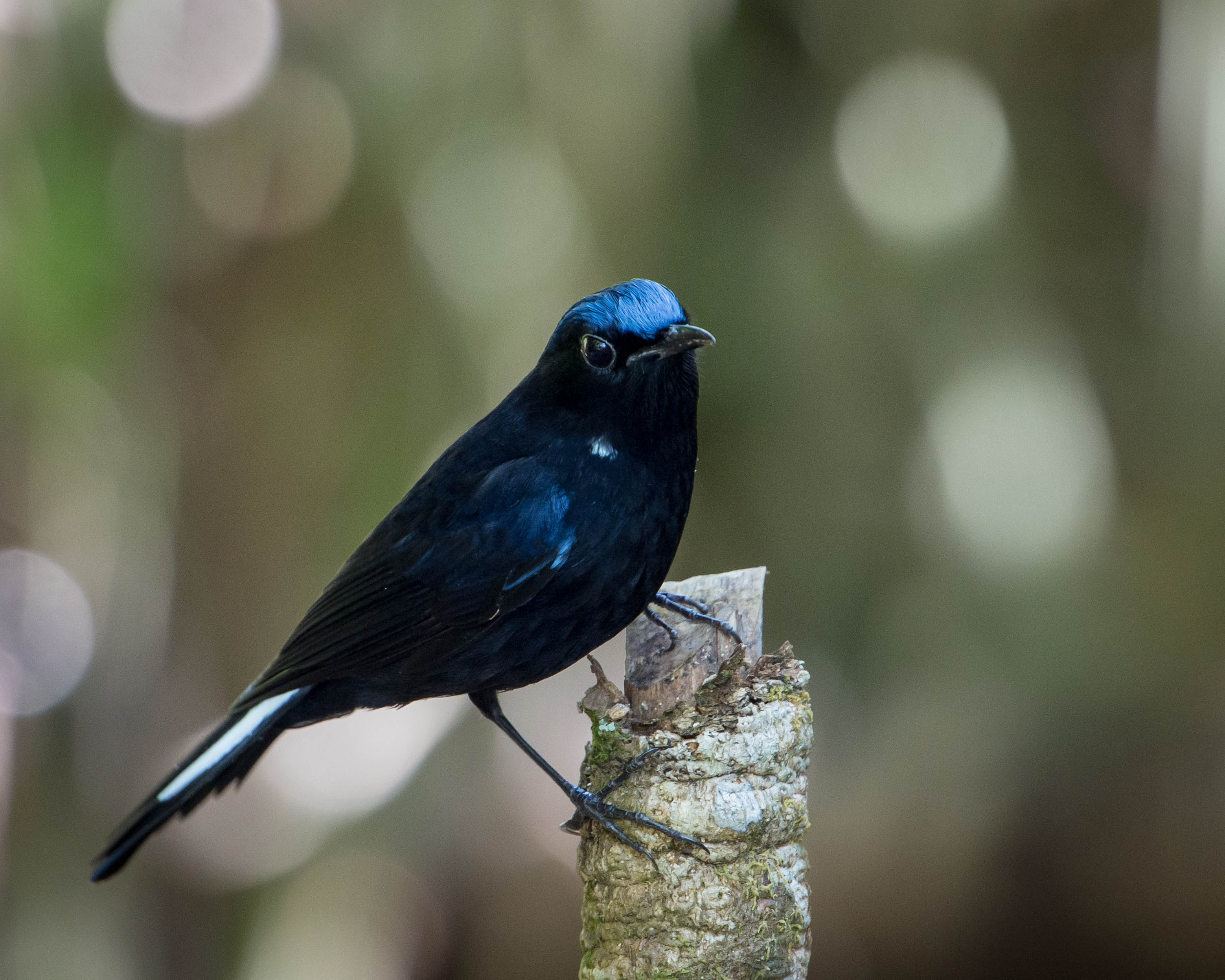
  White-tailed robin

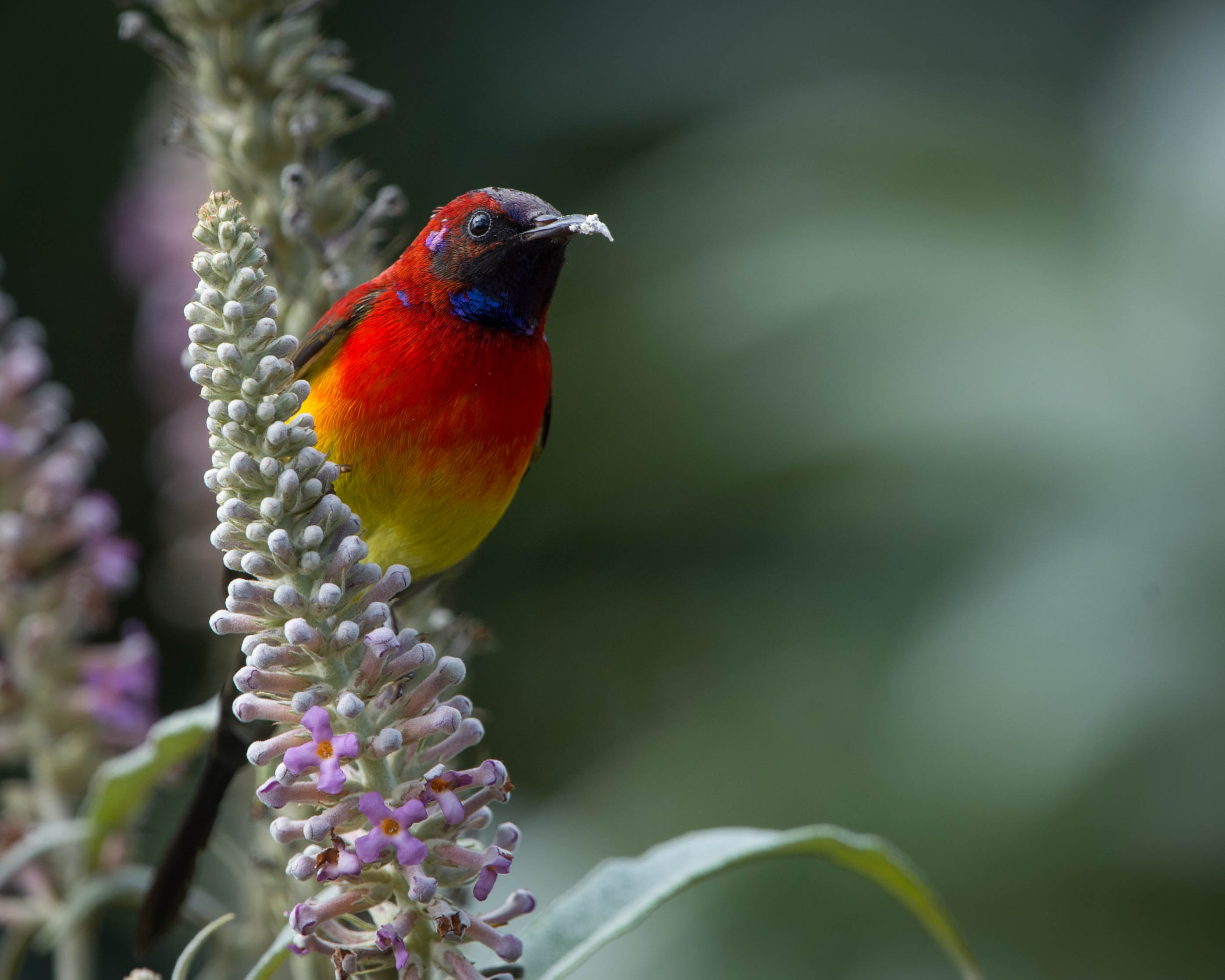
Mrs. Gould's sunbird

=== Fauna ===
The park is internationally famous for its fauna, especially its avian and invertebrate life.

- Birds: The park records over 340 bird species, including many sought-after Himalayan residents like the Black-Throated Bushtit, Himalayan Cutia, Spot-Breasted Laughing Thrush, and winter visitors such as the Scaly Thrush and Chestnut Thrush. The Giant Nuthatch (Sitta magna), an endangered species, also has a habitat here.
- Mammals: Mammals are present but elusive, including the Yellow-Throated Marten, Asiatic Black Bear, Barking Deer (Muntjac), and several squirrel and monkey species.
- Invertebrates: The park protects numerous rare butterflies, such as the Kaiser-i-Hind (Teinopalpus imperialis), Brown Gorgon (Meandrusa sciron), and Golden Birdwing (Troides aeacus). Scientific study has also confirmed the presence of the Himalayan Giant Honey Bee (Apis laboriosa) in the park's summit area.

== Geography ==
Doi Pha Hom Pok National Park is located in the northern part of Thailand, situated in Fang, Mae Ai, and Chai Prakan districts of Chiang Mai Province. The park, which covers 524 square kilometers (202 sq mi), lies on the border with Myanmar to the west and north.

The park's topography is dominated by the Daen Lao Range, a high, complex mountain range that runs in a north–south direction. The elevation within the park varies significantly, from 400 meters (1,300 ft) in the lowland valleys to its highest point at 2,285 meters (7,497 ft).

=== Peaks and Watershed ===
The park's namesake, Doi Pha Hom Pok, is its highest peak. At 2,285 meters, it is the second-highest mountain in all of Thailand, surpassed only by Doi Inthanon. The summit is a granite plain that is often shrouded in fog and experiences cold temperatures year-round. Other significant peaks in the park include Doi Pu Muen and Doi Laem.

This mountainous terrain forms a critical watershed. The park is the source of the Fang River and numerous other streams that flow into it. The high-elevation forests, particularly the hill evergreen forests, play a vital role in capturing moisture and regulating water flow for the surrounding region.

== Climate ==
The park has a tropical savanna climate, but its high elevation results in much cooler temperatures than the surrounding lowlands. The average annual temperature is approximately 25.4 °C (77.7 °F).

- Winter (November–February): The weather is cold and dry. Temperatures on the highest peaks can drop to near-freezing, and frost is common.
- Summer (March–April): This is the hottest season, with temperatures in April reaching up to 39 °C (102 °F) in the lower elevations.
- Rainy Season (May–September): The park receives the majority of its rainfall during these months due to the southwest monsoon.

== Tourism and Recreation ==
Doi Pha Hom Pok National Park is a destination for ecotourism, known for its hot springs, high-altitude trekking, and birdwatching. The park headquarters and primary visitor center are located at the Fang Hot Springs.

=== Key Attractions ===
- Fang Hot Springs: The park's most accessible attraction is a 10-rai (1.6-hectare) geothermal area containing over 50 hot springs. The largest spring is a geyser that erupts steam 40–50 meters (130–160 ft) into the air. Visitor facilities include private mineral baths, steam rooms, and open-air pools. A popular activity is boiling eggs in the 90–130 °C (194–266 °F) water.
- Doi Pha Hom Pok Summit: The summit is the park's main trekking destination. It is renowned for its panoramic views, especially of the sunrise and the "sea of clouds" (Talay Mok), which is most prominent during the cool winter months. Accessing the summit requires hiring a 4WD vehicle to reach the Kiew Lom Campsite. From there, visitors must hike a 3.5-kilometer (2.2 mi) trail to the summit. An overnight stay at the campsite is typically necessary to see the sunrise.
- Birdwatching (Doi Lang): The park is a major destination for birdwatching. The area of Doi Lang, located within the park along the border with Myanmar, is considered one of Thailand's premier birding sites. It is known for its rare high-altitude and migratory species, including the Himalayan Cutia, Red-tailed Laughingthrush, and various pheasants.

=== Facilities and Access ===
The park is located in Fang District, approximately 150 kilometers (93 mi) north of Chiang Mai via Highway 107. The main park entrance and headquarters are at the Fang Hot Springs.

Accommodation within the park is provided by the DNP and includes bungalows for rent near the headquarters and two main campsites. The first campsite is near the Fang Hot Springs, and the second, Kiew Lom, is located at a high altitude to serve as the base for the summit trek.

== Location ==
Doi Pha Hom Pok National Park in overview PARO 16 (Chiang Mai)

2) Doi Pha Hom Pok National Park in overview PARO 16

	National park
1	Doi Inthanon
2	Doi Pha Hom Pok
3	Doi Suthep–Pui
4	Doi Wiang Pha
5	Huai Nam Dang
6	Khun Khan
7	Mae Ping
8	Mae Takhrai
9	Mae Tho
10	Mae Wang
11	Namtok Bua Tong– Namphu Chet Si
12	Op Khan
13	Op Luang
14	Pha Daeng
15	Si Lanna

	Wildlife sanctuary
16	Chiang Dao
17	Mae Lao–Mae Sae
18	Omkoi
19	Samoeng
	Non-hunting area
20	Doi Suthep
21	Mae Lao–Mae Sae
22	Nanthaburi
23	Pa Ban Hong
	Forest park
24	Doi Wiang Kaeo

== See also ==
- List of national parks of Thailand
- DNP - Doi Pha Hom Pok National Park
- List of Protected Areas Regional Offices of Thailand
