= Khun Khan National Park =

National park of Thailand

- อุทยานแห่งชาติขุนขาน
- IUCN category II (national park)
- Location within Thailand
- Location: Thailand
- Nearest city: Chiang Mai
- Coordinates: 18°51′14″N 98°37′26″E
- Area: 208 km^{2} (80 sq mi)
- Established: 18 May 2012
- Visitors: 18,053 (in 2024)
- Governing body: Department of National Parks, Wildlife and Plant Conservation

Khun Khan National Park (Thai: อุทยานแห่งชาติขุนขาน) is a national park in Thailand's Chiang Mai Province. This mountainous park is home to forests, waterfalls and cliff-top viewpoints.

== Geography ==
Khun Khan National Park is located about 50 kilometres (30 mi) west of the city of Chiang Mai in the Samoeng and Mae Chaem districts of Chiang Mai Province. The park's area is 129,959 rai ~ 208 square kilometres (80 sq mi) The park is located in the Thanon Thong Chai mountain range. Elevations range from 500 metres (1,600 ft) to the park's highest point: Doi Pung Kia at 1,708 metres (5,600 ft).

== History ==
The establishment of the national park was declared the 126th national park in the Royal Gazette on 18 May 2012.

== Attractions ==
The park features two significant waterfalls, both year-round: the 7-step Huai Mae Na Poe waterfall and the 2-step Huai Tat waterfall. One of Huai Tat's sections is 30 metres (100 ft) high. Pha Sam Na viewpoint is a three-sided cliff situated at an elevation of 1,253 metres (4,110 ft).

== Flora and fauna ==
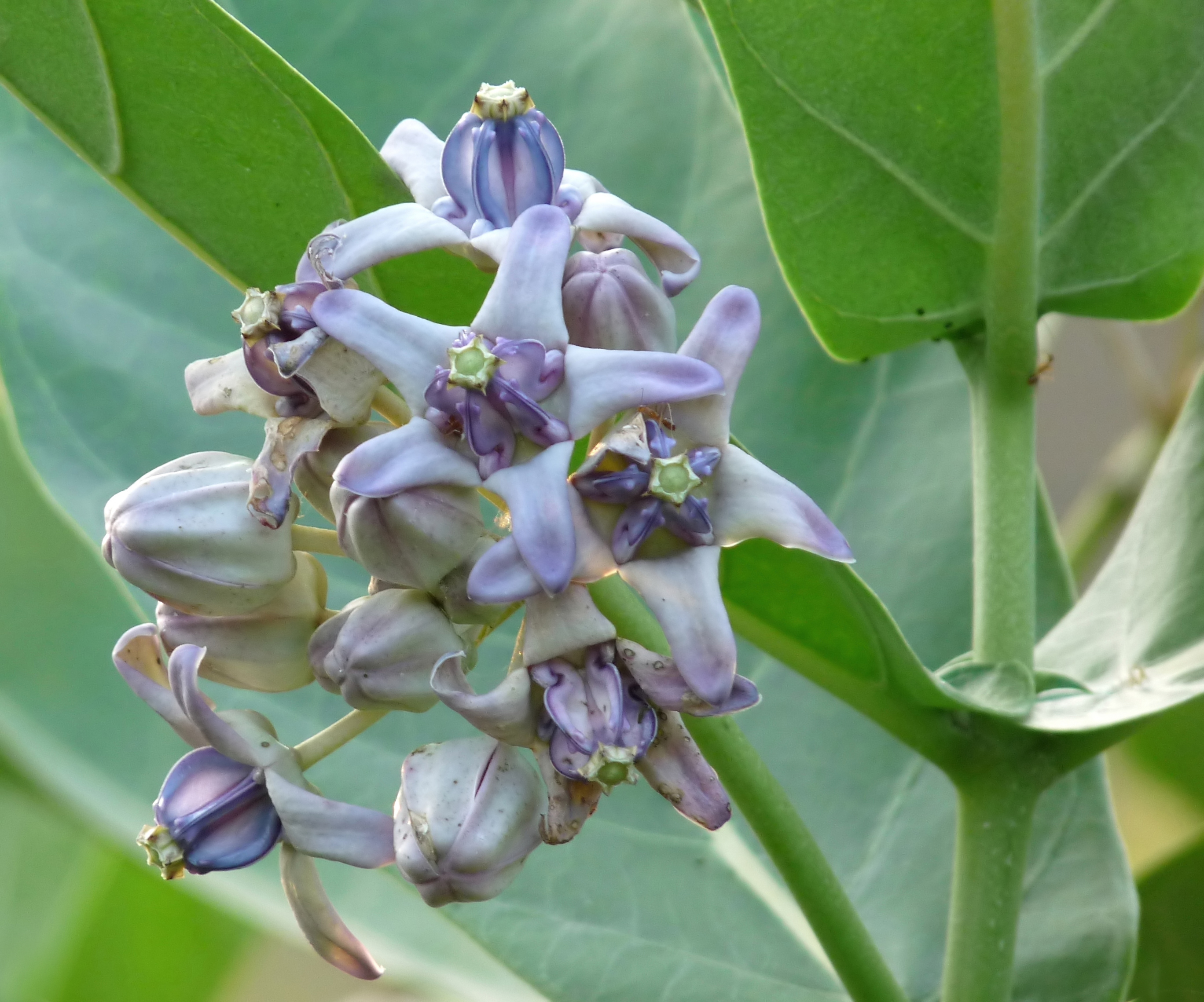
Calotropis gigantea

The park features numerous forest types including virgin forest at elevations above 1,000 metres (3,300 ft). Tree species include three-needled pine, Pinus latteri, Malacca tree, Mammea siamensis, Malabar ironwood, Baccaurea ramiflora, Calotropis gigantea, Shorea siamensis, Dipterocarpus intricatus, Dipterocarpus tuberculatus, Dioscorea alata, Xylia xylocarpa and Gmelina arborea.

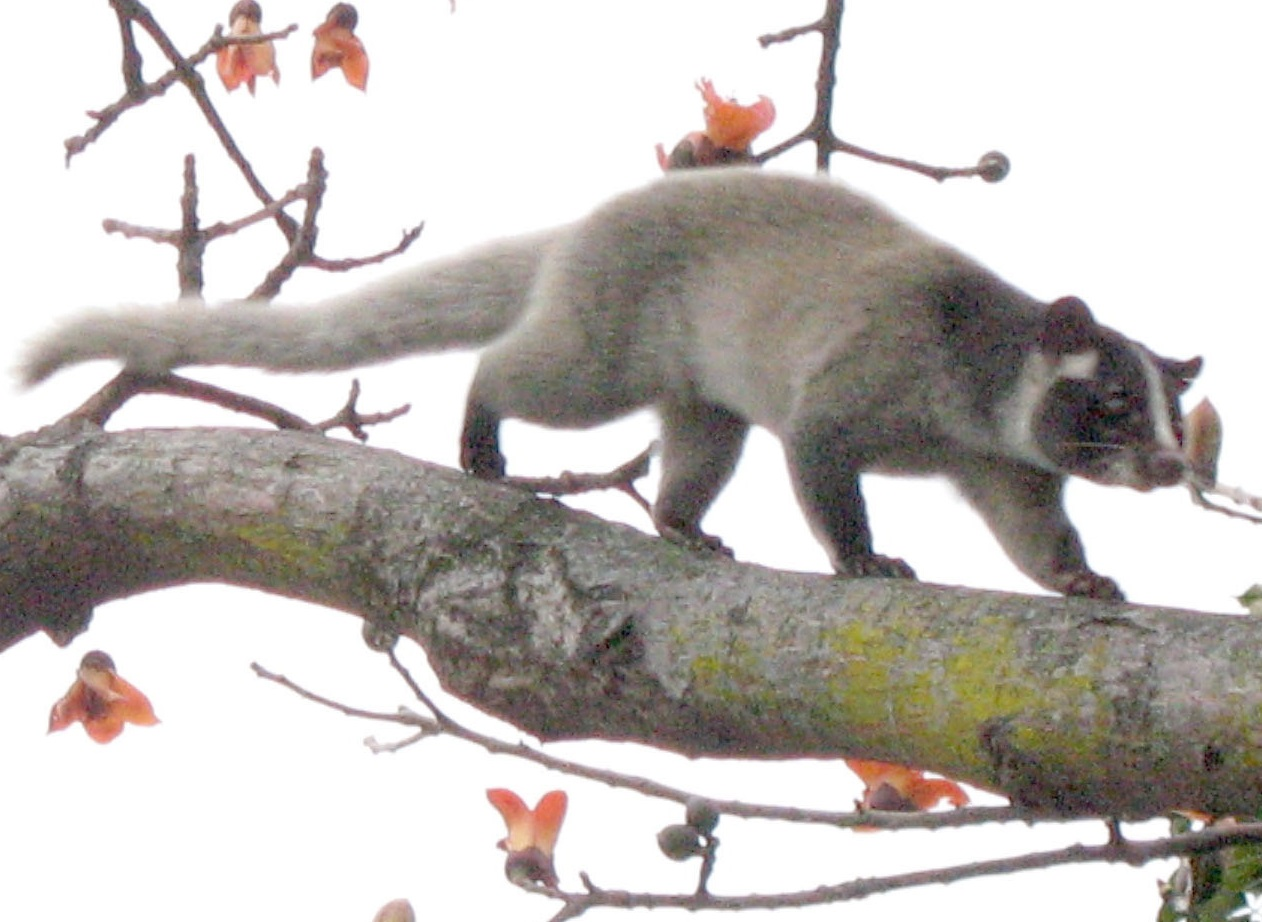
Masked palm civet

The park serves as a sanctuary for animals including tiger, wild boar, barking deer, goral, Asiatic wild dog (dhole), porcupine, pangolin, masked palm civet and mongoose. Bird life includes red junglefowl and great hornbill.

== Location ==
Khun Khan National Park in overview PARO 16 (Chiang Mai)

6) Khun Khan National Park in overview PARO 16 (Chiang Mai)

	National park
1	Doi Inthanon
2	Doi Pha Hom Pok
3	Doi Suthep–Pui
4	Doi Wiang Pha
5	Huai Nam Dang
6	Khun Khan
7	Mae Ping
8	Mae Takhrai
9	Mae Tho
10	Mae Wang
11	Namtok Bua Tong– Namphu Chet Si
12	Op Khan
13	Op Luang
14	Pha Daeng
15	Si Lanna

	Wildlife sanctuary
16	Chiang Dao
17	Mae Lao–Mae Sae
18	Omkoi
19	Samoeng
	Non-hunting area
20	Doi Suthep
21	Mae Lao–Mae Sae
22	Nanthaburi
23	Pa Ban Hong
	Forest park
24	Doi Wiang Kaeo

== See also ==
- List of national parks of Thailand
- DNP - Khun Khan National Park
- List of Protected Areas Regional Offices of Thailand
