= Chiang Dao Wildlife Sanctuary =

Protected area in Chiang Mai Province, Thailand

- เขตรักษาพันธุ์สัตว์ป่าเชียงดาว
- IUCN category Ia (strict nature reserve)
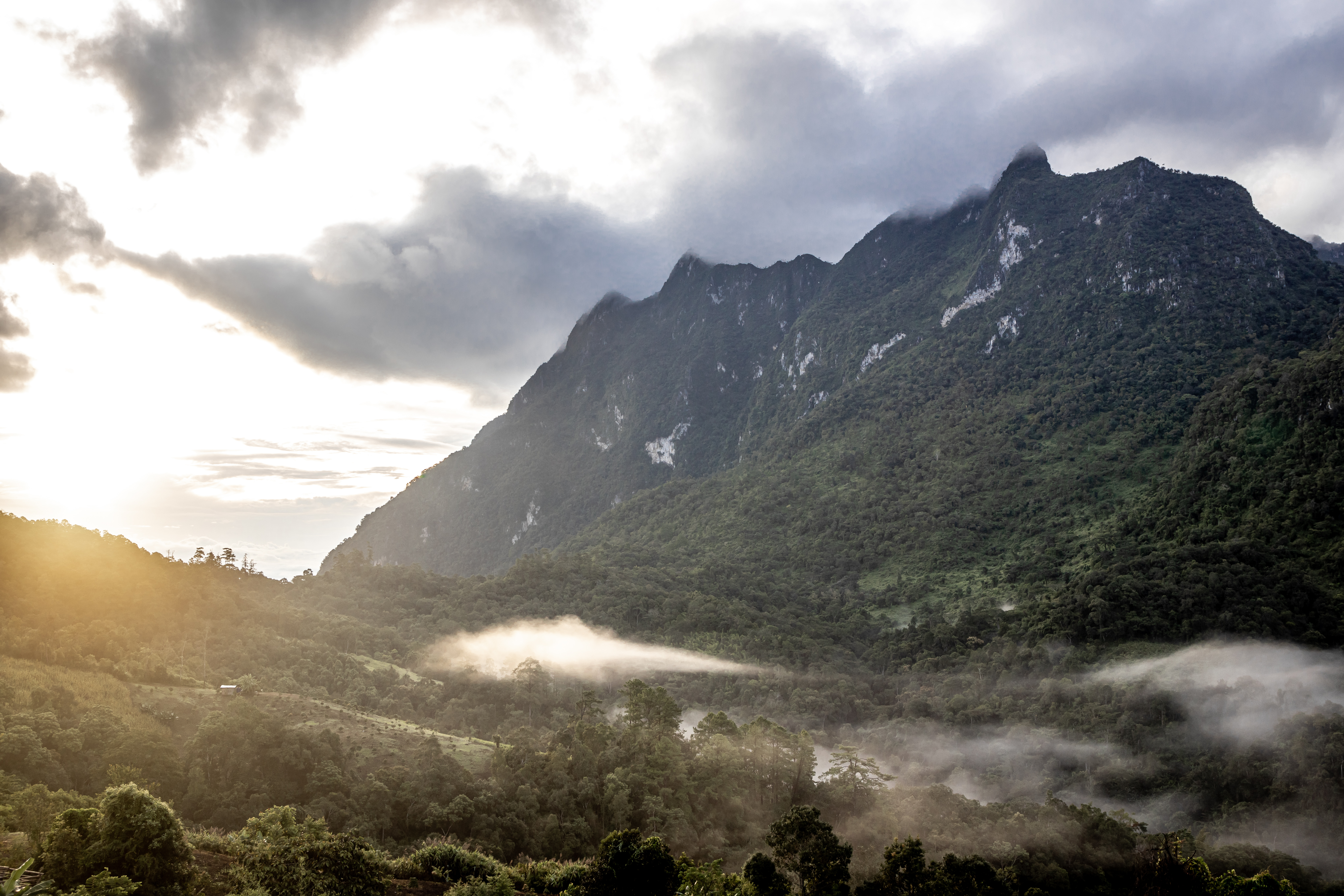
- Doi Chiang Dao is the highest peak in the sanctuary.

- Location within Thailand
- Location: Chiang Dao and Wiang Haeng districts, Chiang Mai Province
- Coordinates: 19°24′16.078″N 98°55′24.718″E
- Area: 521 km^{2}
- Established: 25 August 1978
- Governing body: Wildlife Conservation Office

Chiang Dao Wildlife Sanctuary (Thai: เขตรักษาพันธุ์สัตว์ป่าเชียงดาว) is a protected area in Chiang Mai Province, Thailand. Established on 25 August 1978, the sanctuary covers 521 km^{2} (201 sq mi) of the Doi Chiang Dao and southern mountainous regions of the Daen Lao Range, north of the Thanon Thong Chai Range. The tallest summit is 2,175 m (7,136 ft) high Doi Chiang Dao.

The sanctuary area is covered by various forest types, depending on altitude, including dry evergreen forests, hill evergreen forests, coniferous forests, deciduous dipterocarp forests, and meadows. It is the home to a number of endangered species of animals, such as long-tailed gorals (Naemorhedus caudatus), Sumatran serows (Capricornis sumatraensis), Asian golden cats (Catopuma temminckii), and big-headed turtles (Platysternon megacephalum). Deignan's babblers (Stachyridopsis rodolphei) and Huia melasma are endemic to this area. This sanctuary is also home to Rhacophorus kio, a species of flying frog.

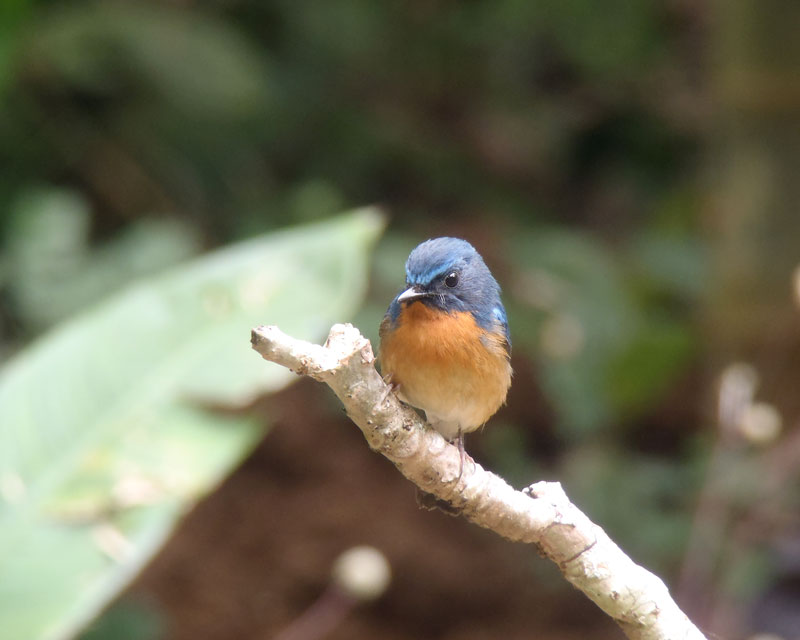
A photo of a hill blue flycatcher in the wildlife sanctuary.

== Location ==
Chiang Dao Wildlife Sanctuary in overview PARO 16 (Chiang Mai)

16) Chiang Dao Wildlife Sanctuary in overview PARO 16 (Chiang Mai)

	National park
1	Doi Inthanon
2	Doi Pha Hom Pok
3	Doi Suthep–Pui
4	Doi Wiang Pha
5	Huai Nam Dang
6	Khun Khan
7	Mae Ping
8	Mae Takhrai
9	Mae Tho
10	Mae Wang
11	Namtok Bua Tong– Namphu Chet Si
12	Op Khan
13	Op Luang
14	Pha Daeng
15	Si Lanna

	Wildlife sanctuary
16	Chiang Dao
17	Mae Lao–Mae Sae
18	Omkoi
19	Samoeng
	Non-hunting area
20	Doi Suthep
21	Mae Lao–Mae Sae
22	Nanthaburi
23	Pa Ban Hong
	Forest park
24	Doi Wiang Kaeo

== See also ==
- Doi Chiang Dao
- DNP - Chiang Dao Wildlife Sanctuary
- Pha Daeng National Park, formerly known as Chiang Dao National Park.
