= Op Luang National Park =

National park in Thailand

- อุทยานแห่งชาติออบหลวง
- IUCN category II (national park)
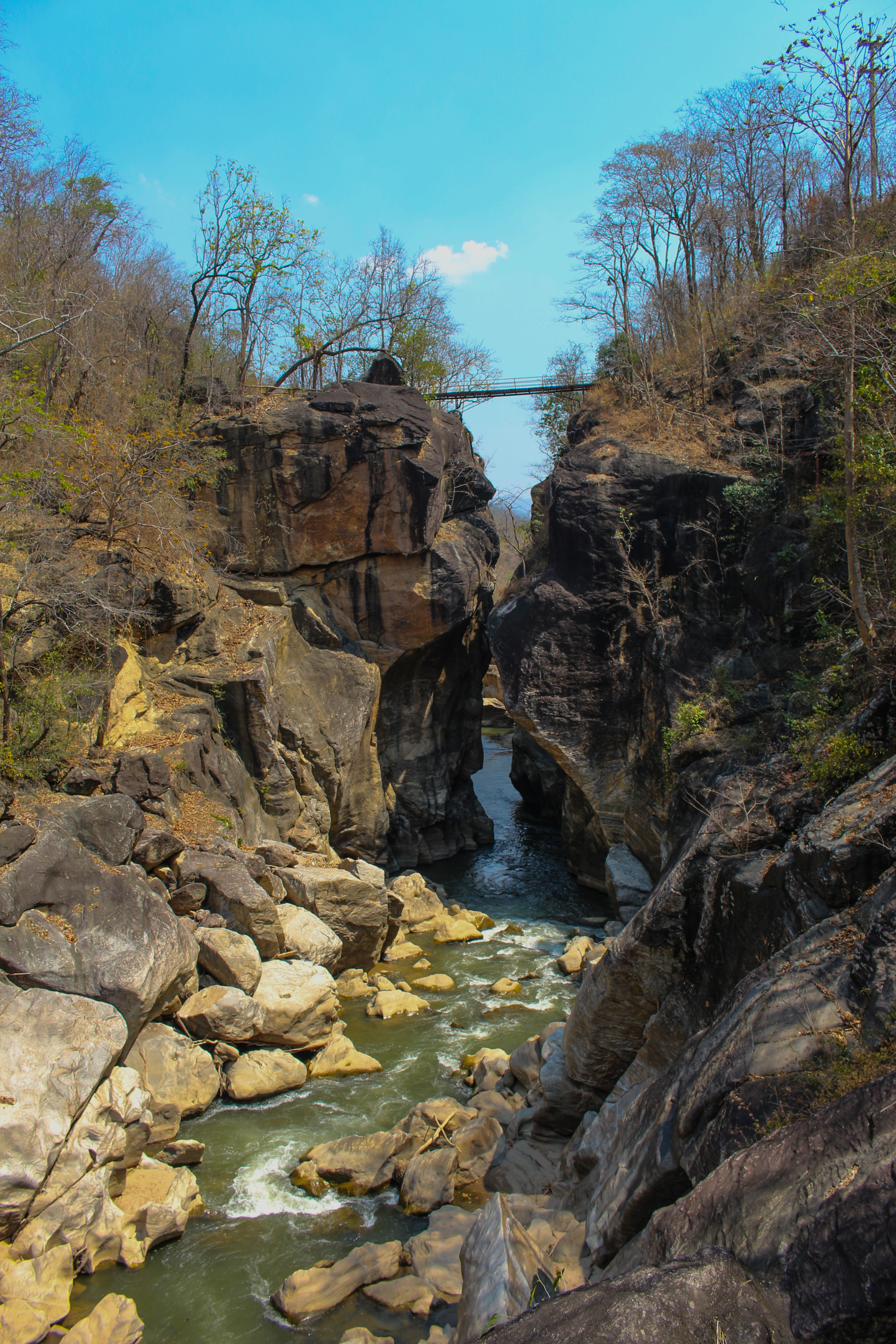
- Op Luang Canyon

- Location within Thailand
- Location: Chiang Mai Province, Thailand
- Nearest city: Lamphun
- Coordinates: 18°13′23″N 98°28′52″E
- Area: 553 km^{2} (214 sq mi)
- Established: 1991
- Visitors: 36,270 (in 2024)
- Governing body: Department of National Parks, Wildlife and Plant Conservation

Op Luang National Park (Thai: อุทยานแห่งชาติออบหลวง) is a national park in Chiang Mai Province, Thailand. It is home to a scenic river canyon, waterfalls, and caves.

== Geography ==
Op Luang National Park is about 105 kilometres (70 mi) south of Chiang Mai in Chom Thong, Mae Chaem and Hot Districts. The park's area is 345,625 rai ~ 553 square kilometres (214 sq mi). It is contiguous with Doi Inthanon National Park. Like Doi Inthanon Park, Op Luang is in the Thanon Thong Chai Range.

== History ==
Prehistoric paintings and other artefacts have been found in Op Luang National Park. The Doi Pha Chang area has a cliff painting of an elephant. Near Op Luang Canyon there are more rock paintings, as well as ancient jewelry and tools. Carbon-dating has indicated these relics to be about 28,000 years old.

The park was a forest park from 1966 to 1991. In 1991 Op Luang became Thailand's 68th National Park.

== Attractions ==
The park's main attraction is Op Luang Canyon, carved out by the Mae Chaem River. The canyon is steep-sided and about 300 metres (1,000 ft) long.

Waterfalls include Mae Bua Kham, about 50 metres (160 ft) high; Mae Chon, about 80 metres (260 ft) wide and the year-round Mae Tia about 80 metres (260 ft) high. Thep Thanom is a hot spring in the west of the park.

Tham Tong is a granite and limestone cave leading to long tunnels. Tham Tu Pu cave features stalagmites and stalactites.

== Flora and fauna ==
The park features forest types including mixed deciduous, deciduous dipterocarp and evergreen. Tree species include Hopea odorata, Dipterocarpus alatus, Xylia xylocarpa, teak, Afzelia xylocarpa, Toona ciliata, Diospyros mollis, Terminalia alata and Lagerstroemia as well as various bamboos, palms and ferns.

Animal species include tiger, sambar deer, Asiatic black bear, common palm civet, large-spotted civet, Sunda pangolin, Phayre's leaf monkey, Siamese hare, Southwest China serow (now mainland serow), tree monitor, northern treeshrew, northern red muntjac (Muntiacus muntjak vaginalis) and wild boar.

Avian life includes vernal hanging parrot, scarlet minivet, white-rumped shama, spotted dove, greater coucal, hill myna, Siamese fireback, red junglefowl, shikra, falconet, red-whiskered bulbul, woodpecker, pheasant and partridge.

== Location ==
Op Luang National Park in overview PARO 16 (Chiang Mai)

13) Op Luang National Park in overview PARO 16 (Chiang Mai)

| | National park |
| 1 | Doi Inthanon |
| 2 | Doi Pha Hom Pok |
| 3 | Doi Suthep–Pui |
| 4 | Doi Wiang Pha |
| 5 | Huai Nam Dang |
| 6 | Khun Khan |
| 7 | Mae Ping |
| 8 | Mae Takhrai |
| 9 | Mae Tho |
| 10 | Mae Wang |
| 11 | Namtok Bua Tong– Namphu Chet Si |
| 12 | Op Khan |
| 13 | Op Luang |
| 14 | Pha Daeng |
| 15 | Si Lanna |

| | Wildlife sanctuary |
| 16 | Chiang Dao |
| 17 | Mae Lao–Mae Sae |
| 18 | Omkoi |
| 19 | Samoeng |
| | Non-hunting area |
| 20 | Doi Suthep |
| 21 | Mae Lao–Mae Sae |
| 22 | Nanthaburi |
| 23 | Pa Ban Hong |
| | Forest park |
| 24 | Doi Wiang Kaeo |

== See also ==
- List of national parks of Thailand
- DNP - Op Luang National Park
- List of Protected Areas Regional Offices of Thailand
