= Mae Wang National Park =

National park in Thailand

- IUCN category II (national park)
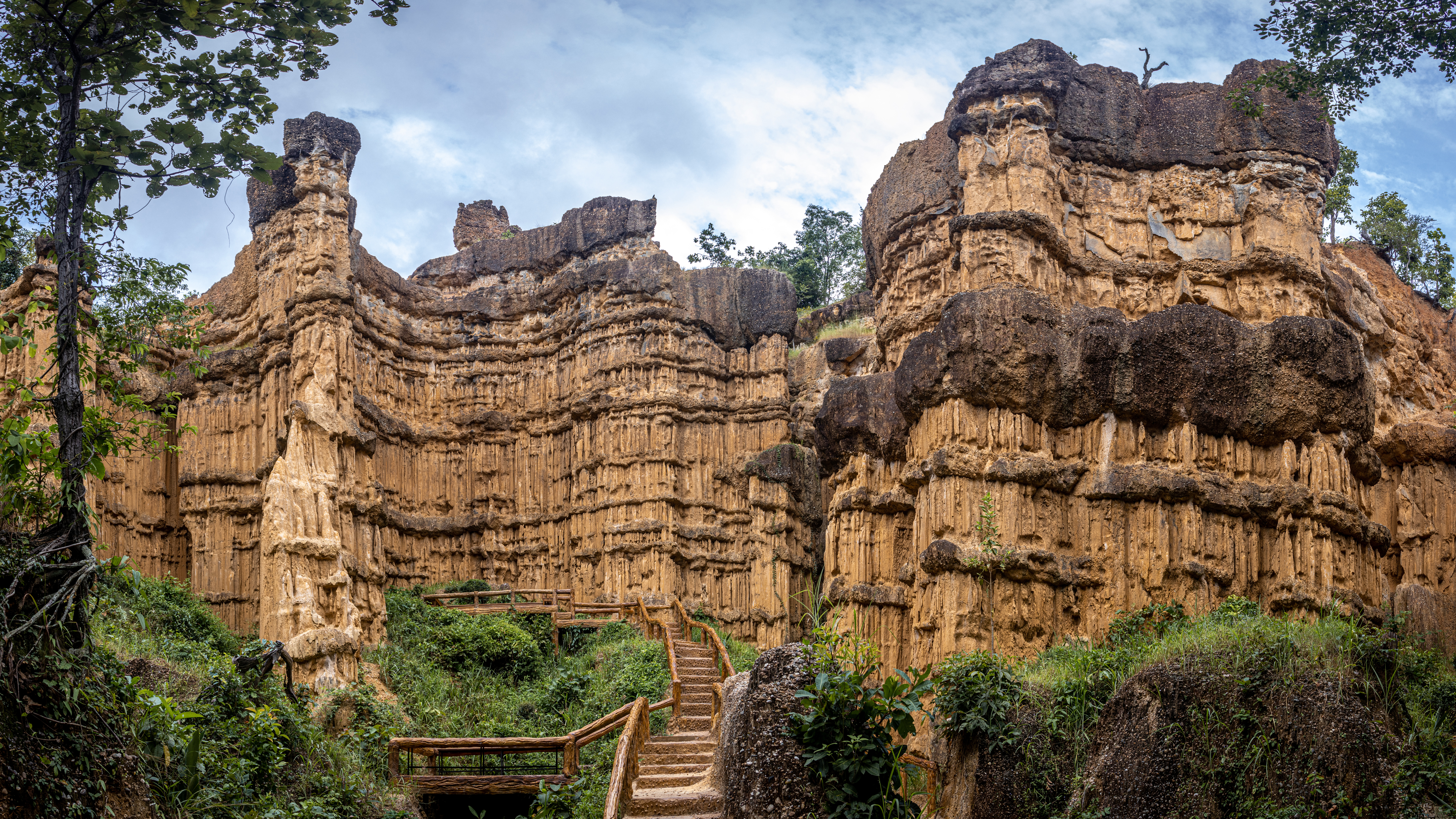

- Location within Thailand
- Location: Chiang Mai Province, Thailand
- Coordinates: 18°31′37″N 98°43′08″E
- Area: 119 km^{2} (46 sq mi)
- Established: 20 November 2009
- Visitors: 66,042 (in 2024)
- Governing body: Department of National Parks, Wildlife and Plant Conservation

Mae Wang National Park (Thai: อุทยานแห่งชาติแม่วาง) is located in Chom Thong District, Doi Lo District and Mae Wang District in Chiang Mai Province. The park covers four national reserved forests in Chiang Mai province: Mae Khan, Mae Wang, Chom Thong and Mae Chaem forests.

== Topography ==
Landscape is mostly covered by mountains and forests, the height ranged from 400 metres (1,300 ft) to 1,909 metres (6,263 ft). Doi Pha Tang is with 1,909 m the highest peak in the park. This part of the Thanon Thong Chai Range is the origin to tributaries of the Mae Chaem, Mae Wang and Mae Tuen rivers, which flow into the Ping River.

== Climate ==
The park is generally cool all year round, average temperature is 20 °C (68 °F) throughout the year. Rainy season is from June to November, average rainfall is 2,000–2,100 millimetres (79–83 in)/year. Winter is from December to February, average temperature is between 15–17 °C (59–63 °F), lowest average temperature is 10–14 °C (50–57 °F). Summer is from March to May.

== History ==
A preliminary survey of the area was set up in June 2001.
Later on 20 November 2009 Mae Wang National Park with an area of 74,766 rai ~ 119 square kilometres (46 sq mi) has been declared the 112th national park.

== Flora ==
The park is home to the following forest types:
Evergreen forest include:

- Bamboo
- Two sorts of pine trees

Deciduous forest include:

- pradu daeng
- tabaek
- tamarind
- teak

Dipterocarp forest include:

- Hopea spp.
- Shorea spp.

== Location ==
Mae Wang National Park in overview PARO 16 (Chiang Mai)

10) Mae Wang National Park in overview PARO 16 (Chiang Mai)

	National park
1	Doi Inthanon
2	Doi Pha Hom Pok
3	Doi Suthep–Pui
4	Doi Wiang Pha
5	Huai Nam Dang
6	Khun Khan
7	Mae Ping
8	Mae Takhrai
9	Mae Tho
10	Mae Wang
11	Namtok Bua Tong– Namphu Chet Si
12	Op Khan
13	Op Luang
14	Pha Daeng
15	Si Lanna

	Wildlife sanctuary
16	Chiang Dao
17	Mae Lao–Mae Sae
18	Omkoi
19	Samoeng
	Non-hunting area
20	Doi Suthep
21	Mae Lao–Mae Sae
22	Nanthaburi
23	Pa Ban Hong
	Forest park
24	Doi Wiang Kaeo

== See also ==
- List of national parks of Thailand
- DNP - Mae Wang National Park
- List of Protected Areas Regional Offices of Thailand
