= Micythus (spider) =

Scientific classification
- Kingdom: Animalia
- Phylum: Arthropoda
- Subphylum: Chelicerata
- Class: Arachnida
- Order: Araneae
- Infraorder: Araneomorphae
- Family: Gnaphosidae
- Genus: Micythus; Thorell, 1897

Type species
- M. pictus Thorell, 1897

Species
- M. anopsis Deeleman-Reinhold, 2001 – Thailand; M. pictus Thorell, 1897 – Myanmar, Indonesia (Borneo); M. rangunensis (Thorell, 1895) – Myanmar, Indonesia (Sumatra, Borneo)

Genus of spiders

Micythus is a genus of Southeast Asian ground spiders that was first described by Tamerlan Thorell in 1897. As of March 2022, it contains only three species: M. anopsis, M. pictus, and M. rangunensis.
