= Thanon Thong Chai Range =

Mountain range in Thailand

Thanon Thong Chai Range Thanon Range
- เทือกเขาถนนธงชัย (Thai); Tanen Taunggyi (Burmese)
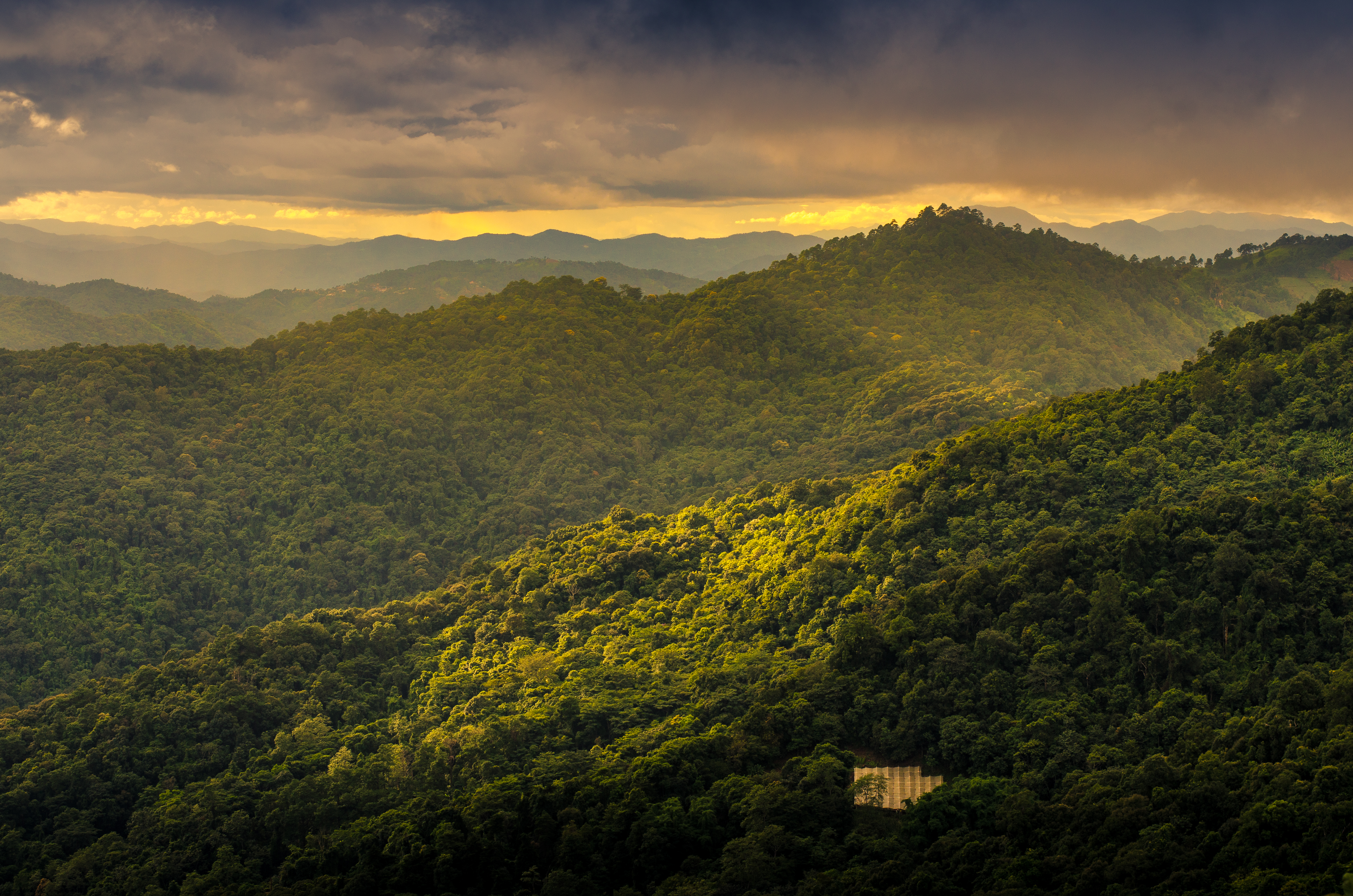
- In Doi Suthep National Park

Highest point
- Peak: Doi Inthanon
- Elevation: 2,565 m (8,415 ft)
- Coordinates: 18°35′16″N 98°29′13″E

Dimensions
- Length: 170 km (110 mi) N/S
- Width: 80 km (50 mi) E/W

Geography
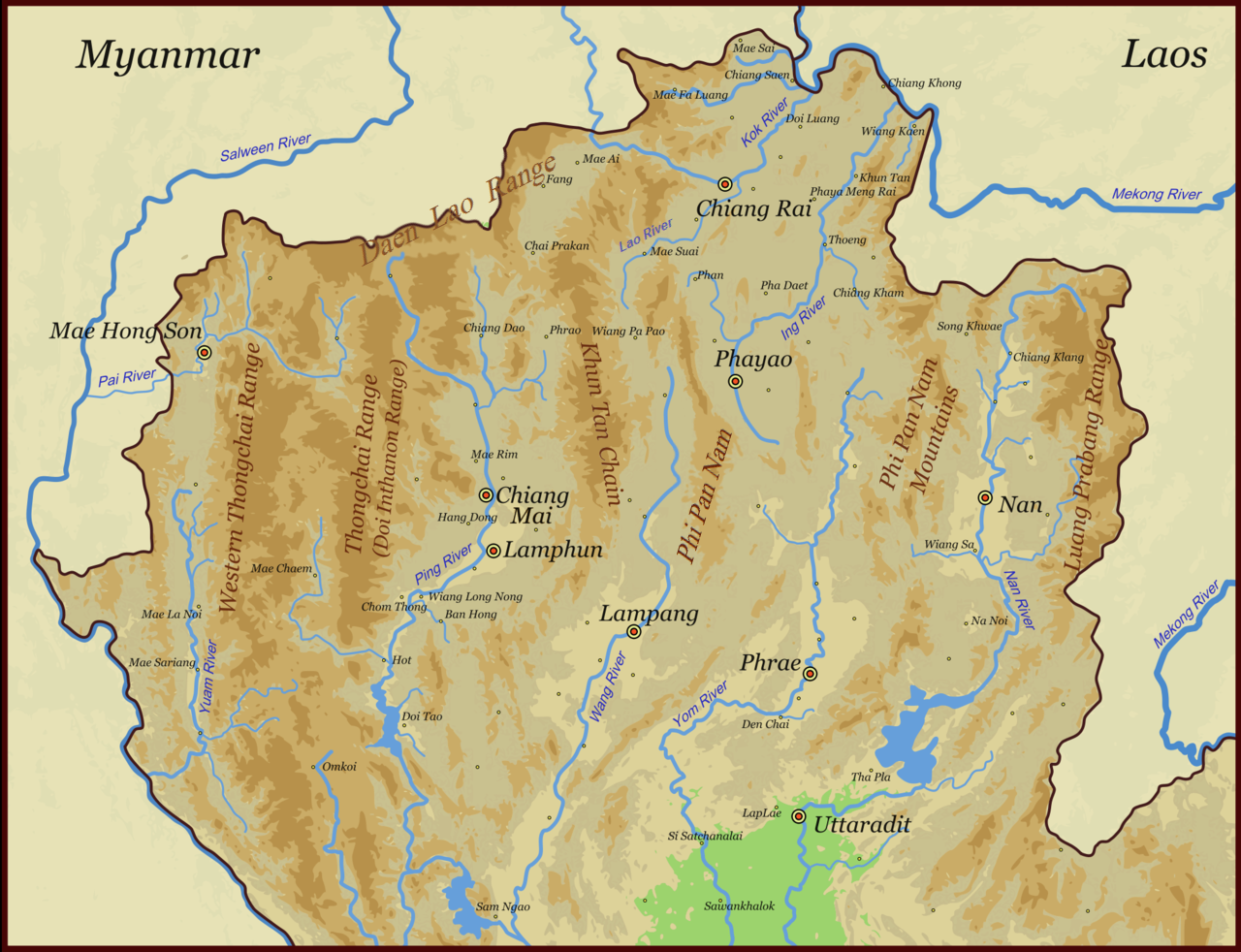
- Map of the Thai highlands
- Country: Thailand
- Provinces: Chiang Mai, Mae Hong Son and Lamphun
- Parent range: Shan Hills

Geology
- Rock age: Precambrian
- Rock types: Granite and limestone

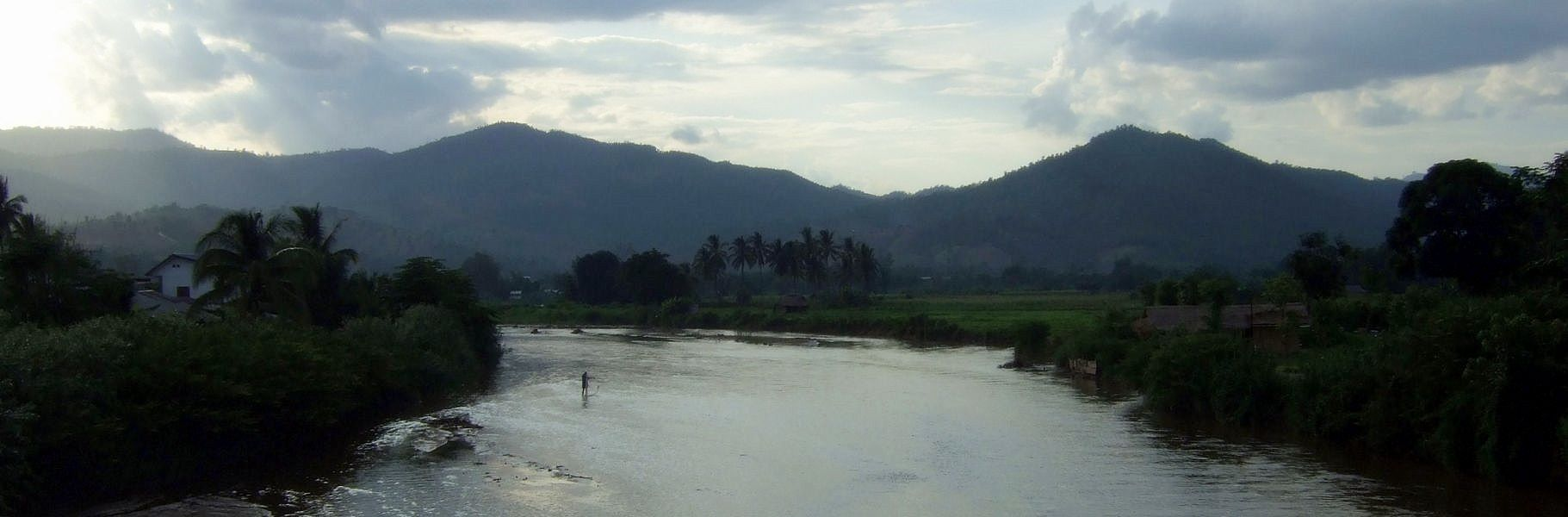
In Mae Chaem District

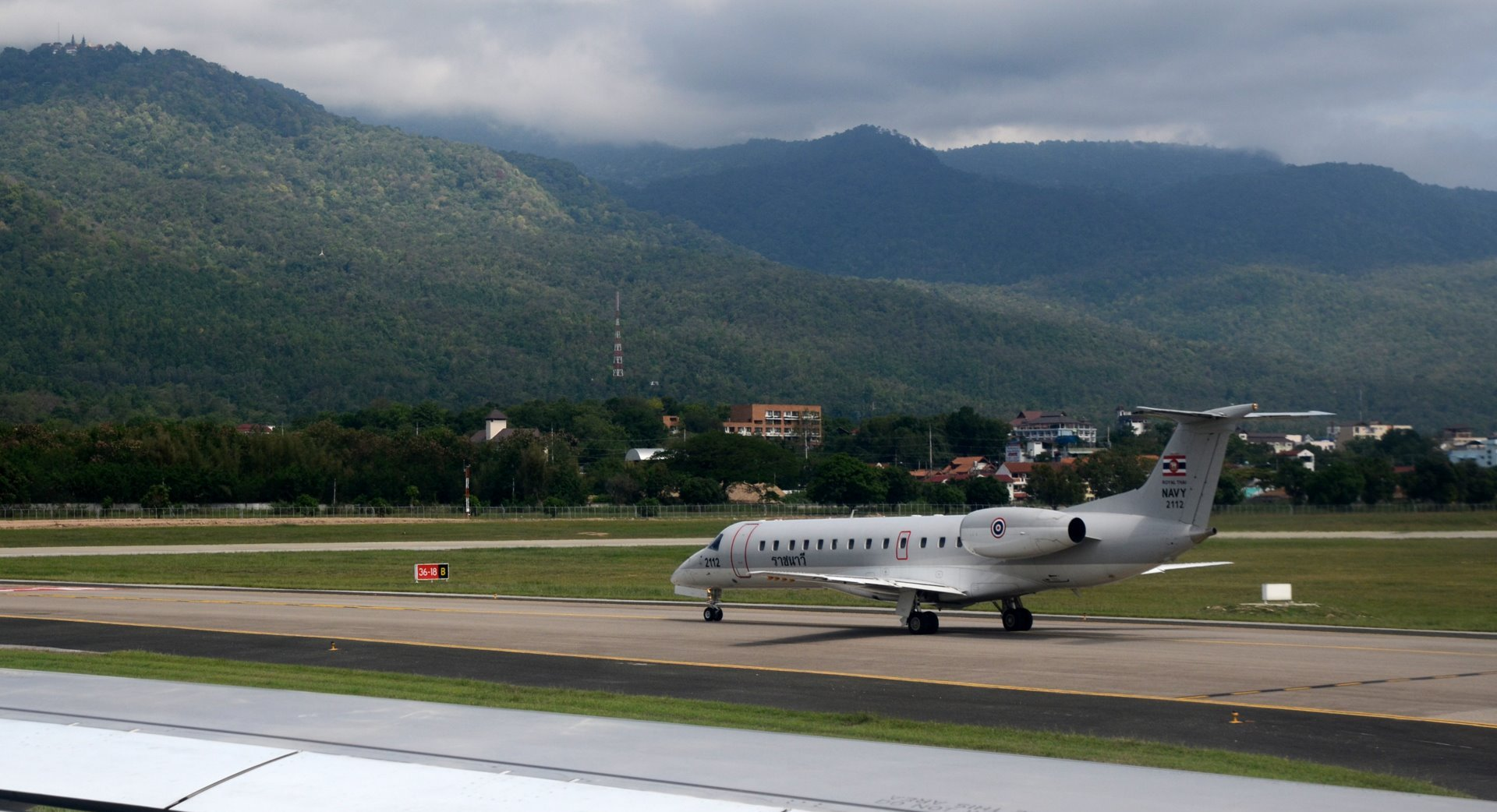
The east side of the Thanon Thong Chai Range rising above Chiang Mai airport

The Thanon Thong Chai Range (Thai: ทิวเขาถนนธงชัย, pronounced [tʰīw kʰǎw tʰānǒn tʰōŋ t͡ɕʰāj], formerly Thanon Range; Burmese Tanen Taunggyi) is a mountain range in northern Thailand. Its tallest peak is Doi Inthanon, the highest point in Thailand. Most of the range is in Chiang Mai Province, with parts in Mae Hong Son and Lamphun Provinces.

Geologically in the Thanon Thong Chai Range, as in the other southern subranges of the Shan Hills, layers of alluvium are superimposed on hard rock. Precambrian rocks are present in this range, but absent in the ranges further east, such as the Khun Tan Range.

== Geography ==
The Thanon Thong Chai Range is the southernmost prolongation of the Shan Hills and it consists of two parallel ranges running southwards from the southwestern limits of the Daen Lao Range between rivers Yuam and Ping. The eastern range is also known as Inthanon Range (ทิวเขาอินทนนท์). Often the Dawna Range further west and south is included as the western part of the Thanon Thong Chai Range. There are also some geographers who include the Thanon Thong Chai as a subrange of the Daen Lao Range.

Doi Inthanon, at 2,565 metres (8,415 ft) in the Inthanon Range, is one of the ultra prominent peaks of Southeast Asia. Other high peaks of the Thanon Thong Chai Range are 2,340 metres (7,680 ft) high Doi Hua Mot Luang, the second highest peak in Thailand, Doi Pui (1,685 metres (5,528 ft)), and 1,676 metres (5,499 ft) high Doi Suthep.

== History ==
Certain hill tribe communities live in the range, like the Hmong and the Karen whose tribal villages dot the mountainsides. Some of these communities are regularly visited by organized tourist groups.

Doi Inthanon was formerly known as Doi Ang Ka and was renamed in honor of King Inthawichayanon at the end of the 19th century.

== Ecology ==
The vegetation is mostly deciduous forest below 1,000 metres (3,300 ft) and evergreen hill forest above this height but there has been heavy deforestation. Since a great proportion of the original forest cover has disappeared, denuded patches of grassland and mixed bushy vegetation are common. Some projects for the restoration of forest cover have been undertaken in ecologically degraded areas.

Animal species in the Thanon Thong Chai Range are threatened by deliberate wildfires that are set seasonally by farmers in different areas across the range. Wild fauna in the range includes Sambar deer, barking deer, serow, leopard, goral and the Tenasserim white-bellied rat, as well as many bird species. A number of national parks and wildlife sanctuaries are found in the range.

=== Protected areas ===
- Doi Inthanon National Park
- Doi Suthep-Pui National Park
- Khun Khan National Park
- Mae Ngao National Park
- Mae Ping National Park
- Mae Tho National Park
- Mae Wang National Park
- Namtok Mae Surin National Park
- Op Luang National Park
- Op Khan National Park
- Chiang Dao Wildlife Sanctuary
- Lum Nam Pai Wildlife Sanctuary
- Mae Lao-Mae Sae Wildlife Sanctuary
- Mae Tuen Wildlife Sanctuary
- Om Koi Wildlife Sanctuary

== See also ==
- Deforestation in Thailand
- Doi Inthanon
- Western Forest Complex
- Thai highlands
