= Pha Daeng National Park =

National park in Chiang Mai, Thailand

- อุทยานแห่งชาติผาแดง
- IUCN category II (national park)
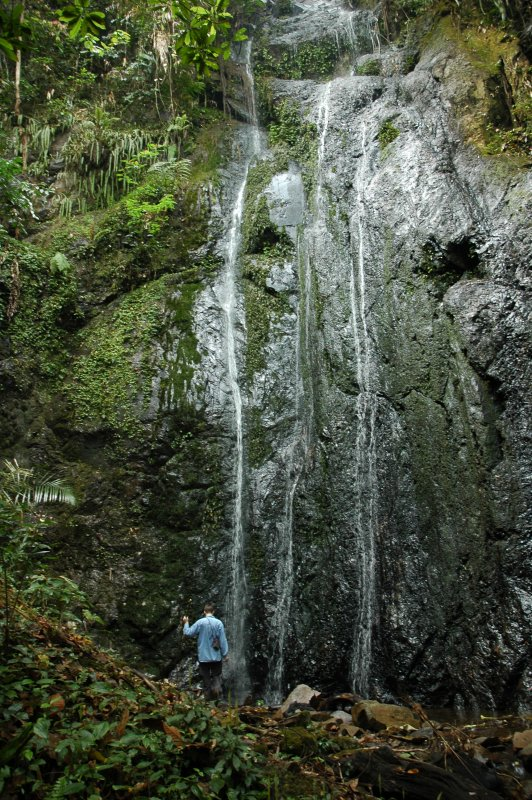

- Location within Thailand
- Location: Chiang Dao District, Chiang Mai Province, Thailand
- Coordinates: 19°37′43.025″N 98°57′21.772″E
- Area: 1,123 km^{2} (434 sq mi)
- Established: 2 November 2000; 25 years ago
- Visitors: 39,534 (in 2024)
- Governing body: Department of National Parks, Wildlife and Plant Conservation

Pha Daeng National Park (Thai: อุทยานแห่งชาติผาแดง), formerly known as Chiang Dao National Park, is a national park in Chiang Mai Province, Thailand. The park covers 702,085 rai ~ 1,123 square kilometres (434 sq mi) of the Pha Daeng mountain areas of the Daen Lao Range near the border with Burma, just north of Chiang Dao Wildlife Sanctuary. The tallest summit is 1,794 m high Doi Puk Phakka.

== History ==
The establishment of the national park was declared in the Royal Gazette on 2 November 2000. It became Thailand's 99th national park.

== Gallery ==
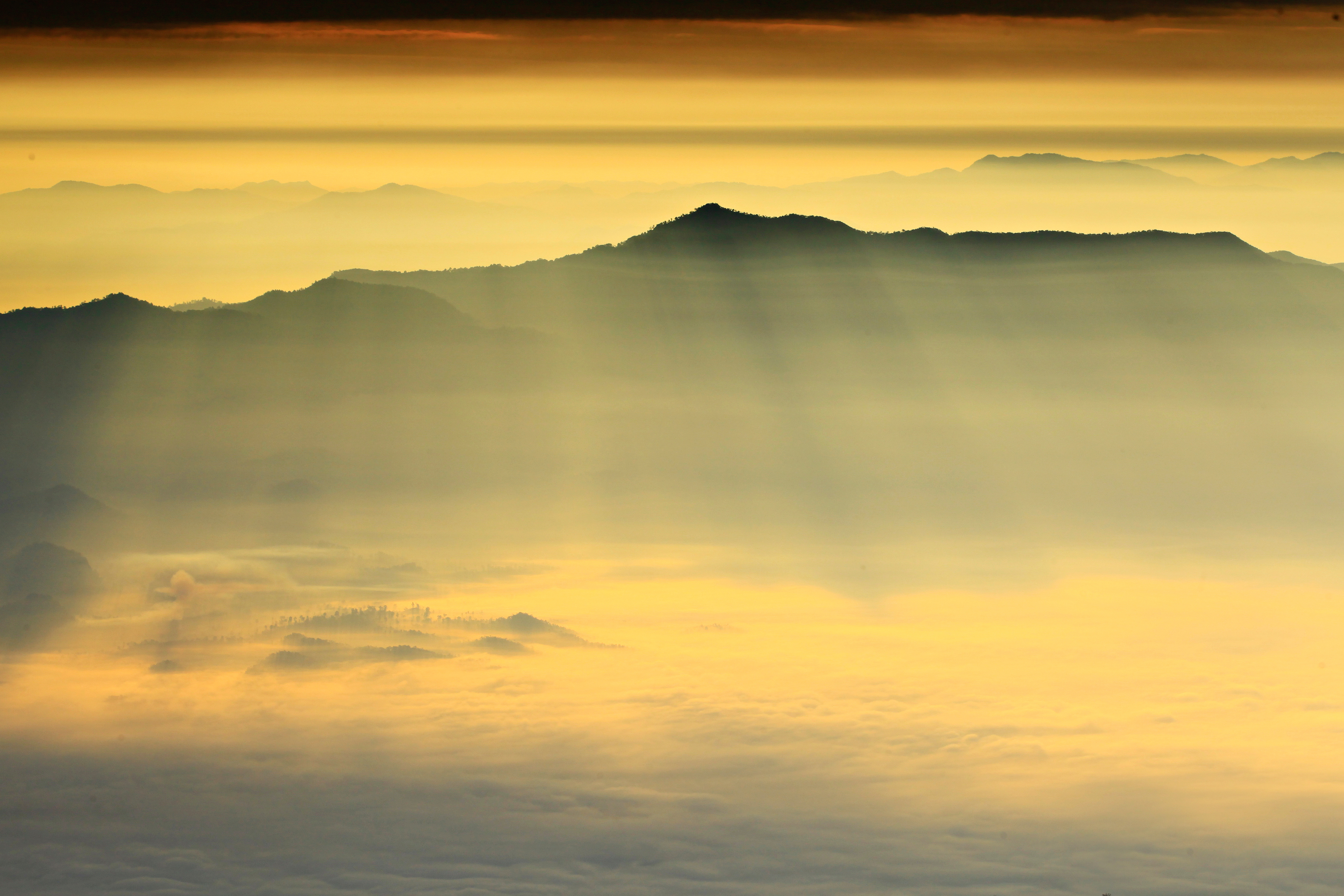
Pha Daeng National Park in Chiang Dao District

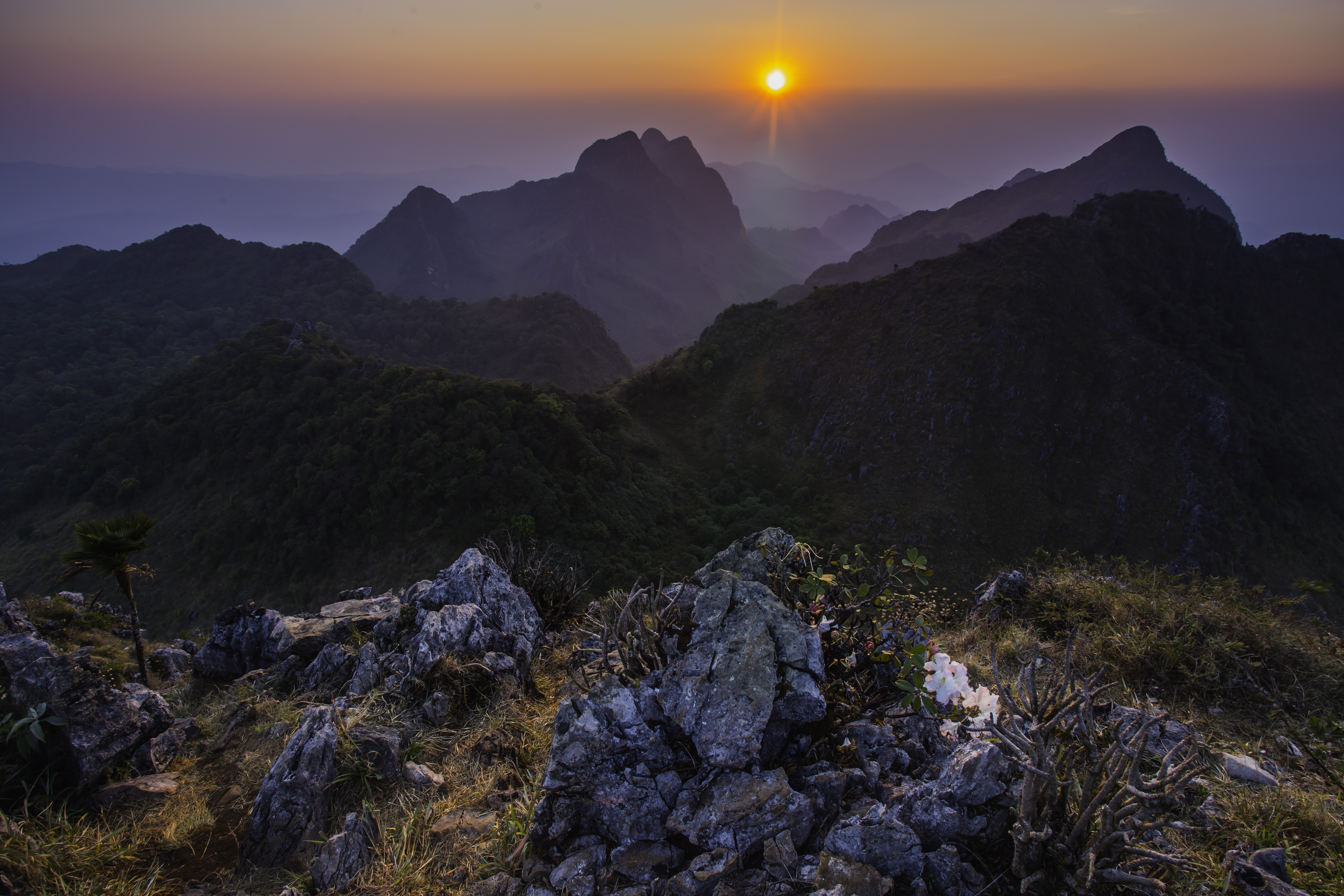
Pha Daeng National Park in Chiang Dao District

== Location ==
Pha Daeng National Park in overview PARO 16 (Chiang Mai)

14) Pha Daeng National Park in overview PARO 16 (Chiang Mai)

| | National park |
| 1 | Doi Inthanon |
| 2 | Doi Pha Hom Pok |
| 3 | Doi Suthep–Pui |
| 4 | Doi Wiang Pha |
| 5 | Huai Nam Dang |
| 6 | Khun Khan |
| 7 | Mae Ping |
| 8 | Mae Takhrai |
| 9 | Mae Tho |
| 10 | Mae Wang |
| 11 | Namtok Bua Tong– Namphu Chet Si |
| 12 | Op Khan |
| 13 | Op Luang |
| 14 | Pha Daeng |
| 15 | Si Lanna |

| | Wildlife sanctuary |
| 16 | Chiang Dao |
| 17 | Mae Lao–Mae Sae |
| 18 | Omkoi |
| 19 | Samoeng |
| | Non-hunting area |
| 20 | Doi Suthep |
| 21 | Mae Lao–Mae Sae |
| 22 | Nanthaburi |
| 23 | Pa Ban Hong |
| | Forest park |
| 24 | Doi Wiang Kaeo |

== See also ==
- Chiang Dao Wildlife Sanctuary
- List of national parks of Thailand
- DNP - Pha Daeng National Park
- List of Protected Areas Regional Offices of Thailand
