= Mae Ping National Park =

National park of Thailand

- อุทยานแห่งชาติแม่ปิง
- IUCN category II (national park)
- Location within Thailand
- Location: Thailand
- Nearest city: Tak
- Coordinates: 17°34′N 98°48′E
- Area: 1,003.7 km^{2} (387.5 sq mi)
- Established: 8 August 1981
- Visitors: 35,415 (in 2024)
- Governing body: Department of National Parks, Wildlife and Plant Conservation

Mae Ping National Park (Thai: อุทยานแห่งชาติแม่ปิง, RTGS Utthayan Haeng Chat Mae Ping, pronounced [ùt-tá-yaān hàeng châāt mâāe bping]) in Thailand is a park located on the west of the Ping River.

== Geography ==
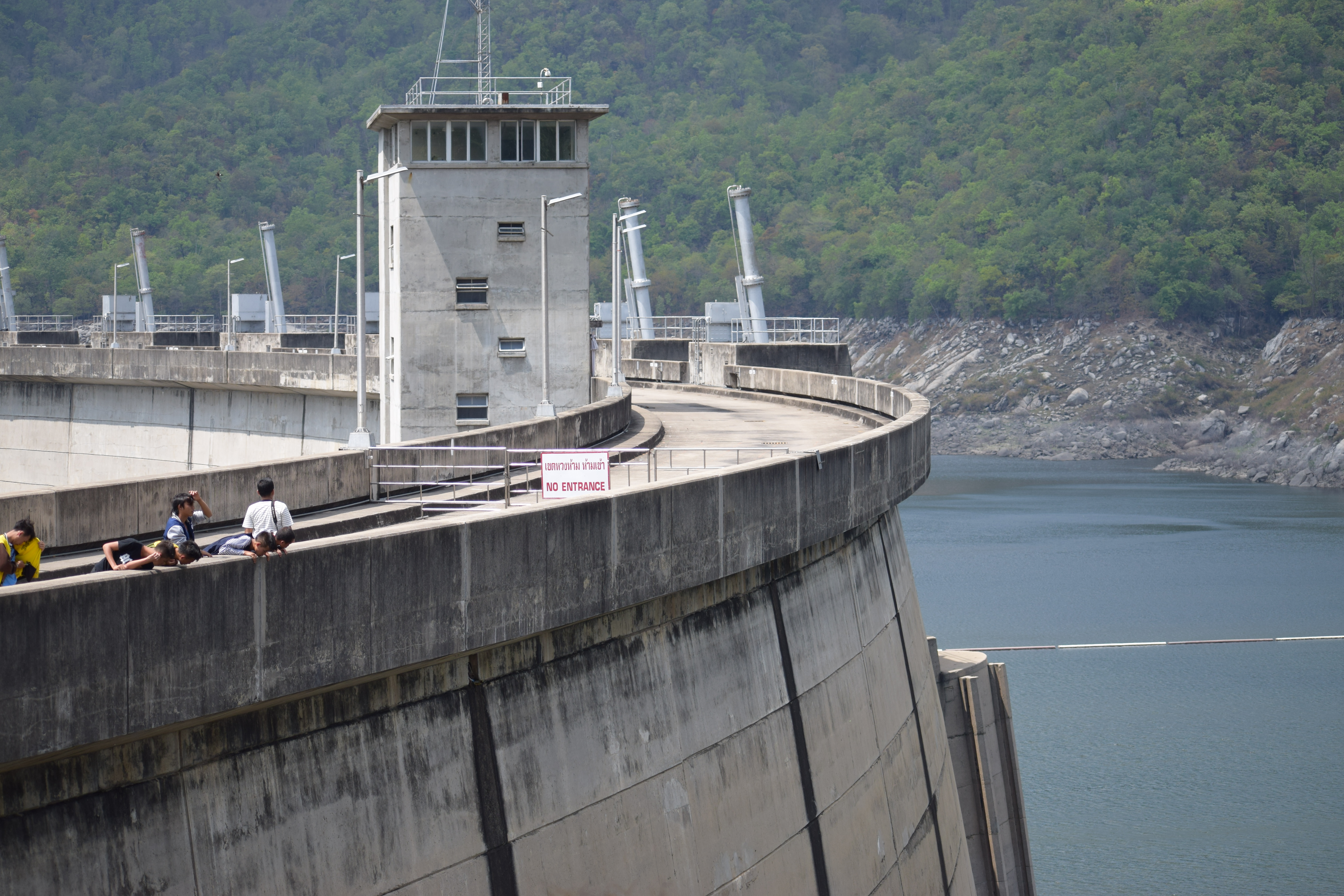
Bhumibol Dam 12

Mae Ping National Park is characterized by a mountainous terrain, primarily composed of fold mountains running north to south. The highest peak, known as, "Don Huai Lao", reaches an elevation of 1,334 meters. The western boundary of the park is defined by the Ping River, a significant waterway in the region. Several smaller creeks and streams originate from these mountains, eventually feeding into the Ping River. These waterways contribute to the diverse habitats within the park, ranging from dry dipterocarp forests to lush evergreen forests and grasslands.

=== Climate ===
The park is located in northern Thailand, with a climate experiencing three distinct seasons: rainy, cold, and hot. The presence of the mountains and extensive forest cover influences the local climate, resulting in variations in temperature and rainfall within the park. The average temperature in the higher elevations hovers around 25 degrees Celsius, while the lower regions near the Bhumibol Dam are slightly warmer, averaging 27 degrees Celsius. The park receives an average annual rainfall of 1,060-1,184 mm, with September being the most humid month. This seasonal variation in rainfall contributes to the dry deciduous nature of the forests, which are prone to wildfires during the dry season.

== History ==
The initial push towards the park's creation emerged in 1978 when the Tourism Promotion Board of Lamphun passed a resolution, advocating for the establishment of a forest park within the Mae Hat – Mae Ko National Reserved Forest. This resolution aimed to harness the tourism potential of the area while implementing measures for controlled and organized activities. This marked the beginning of a series of surveys and assessments to determine the area's suitability for protection. In 1981 the area encompassing Mae Hat and Mae Ko forests was designated as Thailand's 32nd national park.

== Location ==
Mae Ping National Park in overview PARO 16 (Chiang Mai)

7) Mae Ping National Park in overview PARO 16 (Chiang Mai)

	National park
1	Doi Inthanon
2	Doi Pha Hom Pok
3	Doi Suthep–Pui
4	Doi Wiang Pha
5	Huai Nam Dang
6	Khun Khan
7	Mae Ping
8	Mae Takhrai
9	Mae Tho
10	Mae Wang
11	Namtok Bua Tong– Namphu Chet Si
12	Op Khan
13	Op Luang
14	Pha Daeng
15	Si Lanna

	Wildlife sanctuary
16	Chiang Dao
17	Mae Lao–Mae Sae
18	Omkoi
19	Samoeng
	Non-hunting area
20	Doi Suthep
21	Mae Lao–Mae Sae
22	Nanthaburi
23	Pa Ban Hong
	Forest park
24	Doi Wiang Kaeo
