= Dipterocarpus tuberculatus =

- In Thailand

Conservation status
- Near Threatened (IUCN 3.1)

Scientific classification
- Kingdom: Plantae
- Clade: Tracheophytes
- Clade: Angiosperms
- Clade: Eudicots
- Clade: Rosids
- Order: Malvales
- Family: Dipterocarpaceae
- Genus: Dipterocarpus
- Species: D. tuberculatus

Binomial name
- Dipterocarpus tuberculatus Roxb.

Species of flowering plant

Dipterocarpus tuberculatus (Khmer khlông, Indian English gurjuntree) is a species of tree in the family Dipterocarpaceae. It is native to Bangladesh, Myanmar, Thailand, Cambodia, Laos and Vietnam. The tree is found in clear plains forests, up to 800–1,000 m (2,600–3,300 ft) elevation. It grows to a height of 5–25 m (16–82 ft).

The lipids and wood are used in the Indian subcontinent. Uses in Cambodia include: using the leaves for packaging and sometimes for covering huts; the wood, resistant to bad weather, is used to make beams, boards and for the manufacture of boats; and the roots are used in traditional medicine to cure fractures. At least recently, the tree has been an important firewood source in some areas of the Cambodian province of Kompong Chhnang.
