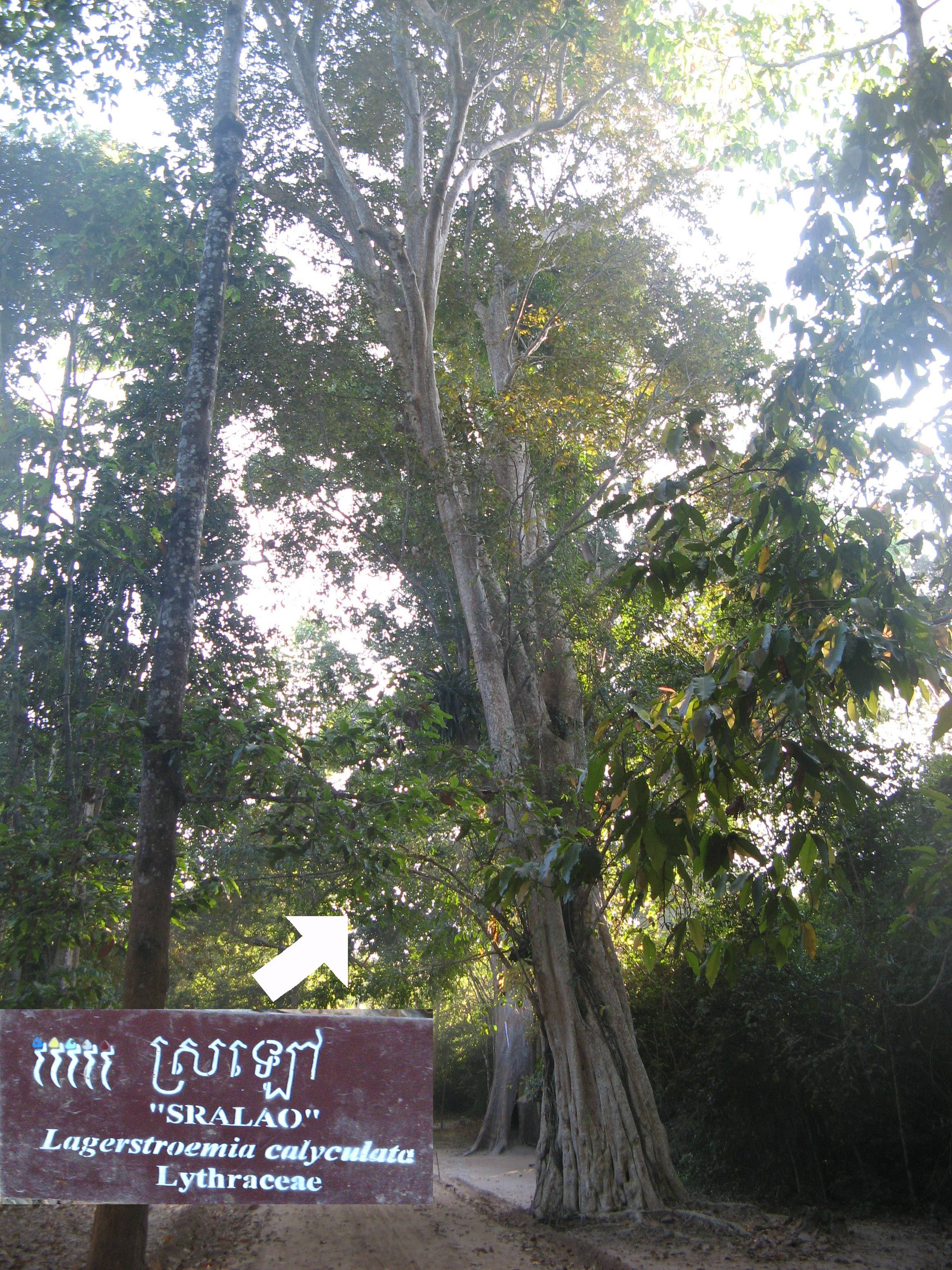

Scientific classification
- Kingdom: Plantae
- Clade: Embryophytes
- Clade: Tracheophytes
- Clade: Angiosperms
- Clade: Eudicots
- Clade: Rosids
- Order: Myrtales
- Family: Lythraceae
- Genus: Lagerstroemia
- Species: L. calyculata

Binomial name
- Lagerstroemia calyculata Kurz

Synonyms
- Murtughas calyculata (Kurz) Kuntze; Lagerstroemia angustifolia Pierre ex Gagnep.

= Lagerstroemia calyculata =

Species of tree

Lagerstroemia calyculata is a species of flowering plant in the family Lythraceae found mostly in the seasonal tropical forests of Indochina. It is known as the "Guava Crape Myrtle" (Vietnamese: Bằng Lăng Ổi, Bằng Lăng Cườm; Thai: ตะแบก tabaek; Cambodian name: Khmer: ដើមស្រឡៅ, romanized: Srolao); the name is derived from its very characteristic mottled flaky bark. It is found in Southeast Asia and Oceania.

== Description ==
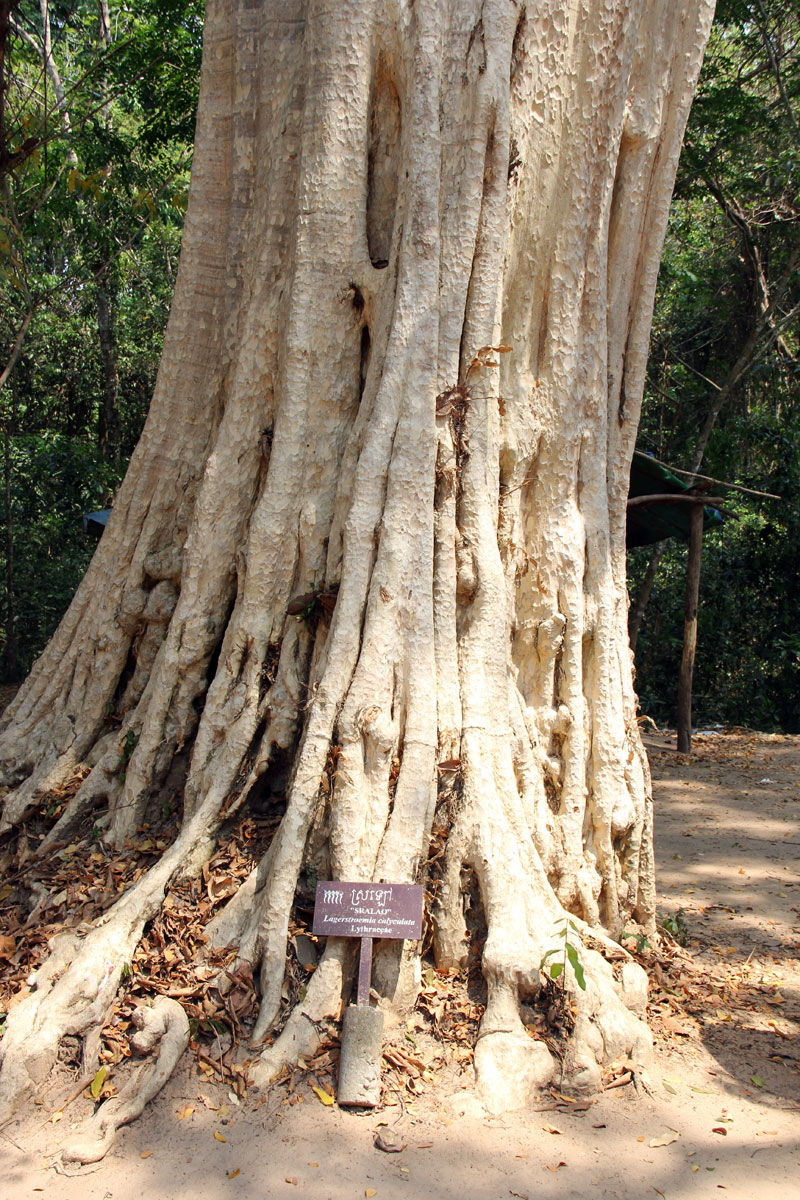
L. calyculata trunk in Angkor Park, Cambodia

L. calyculata is a medium-sized tree growing up to a height between 10 and 20 m (35 and 65 ft). Like other species of the same genus, it is quite common as a decorative tree in the parks of Thailand owing to its beautiful bunches of pink flowers. Its wood has a low commercial value, which is why it thought to have maintained the forest structure in previously logged parts of Cat Tien National Park, where it may constitute >25% of tree counts.
