= Chiang Mai province =

Largest province of Thailand

Chiang Mai เชียงใหม่ ᨩ᩠ᨿᨦᩉᩲ᩠ᨾ᩵
- Province
- จังหวัดเชียงใหม่ · ᨧᩢ᩠ᨦᩉ᩠ᩅᩢᨩ᩠ᨿᨦᩉᩲ᩠ᨾ᩵

Other transcription(s)
  - Northern Thai: ᨩ᩠ᨿᨦᩉᩲ᩠ᨾ᩵
  - Chinese: 清邁 / 清迈 cêng1 mai6 (Teochew Peng'im); Qīngmài (Mandarin Pinyin)
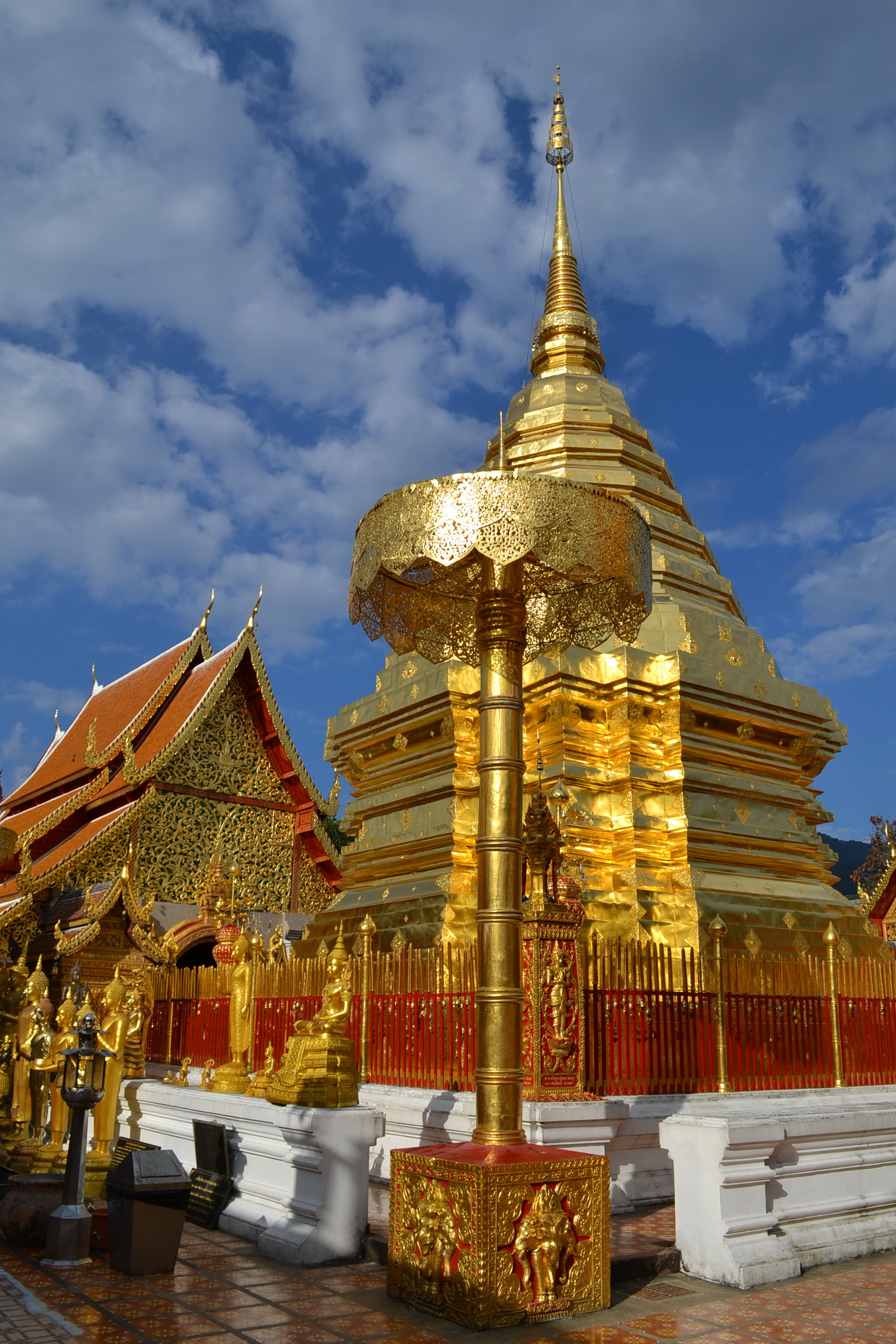
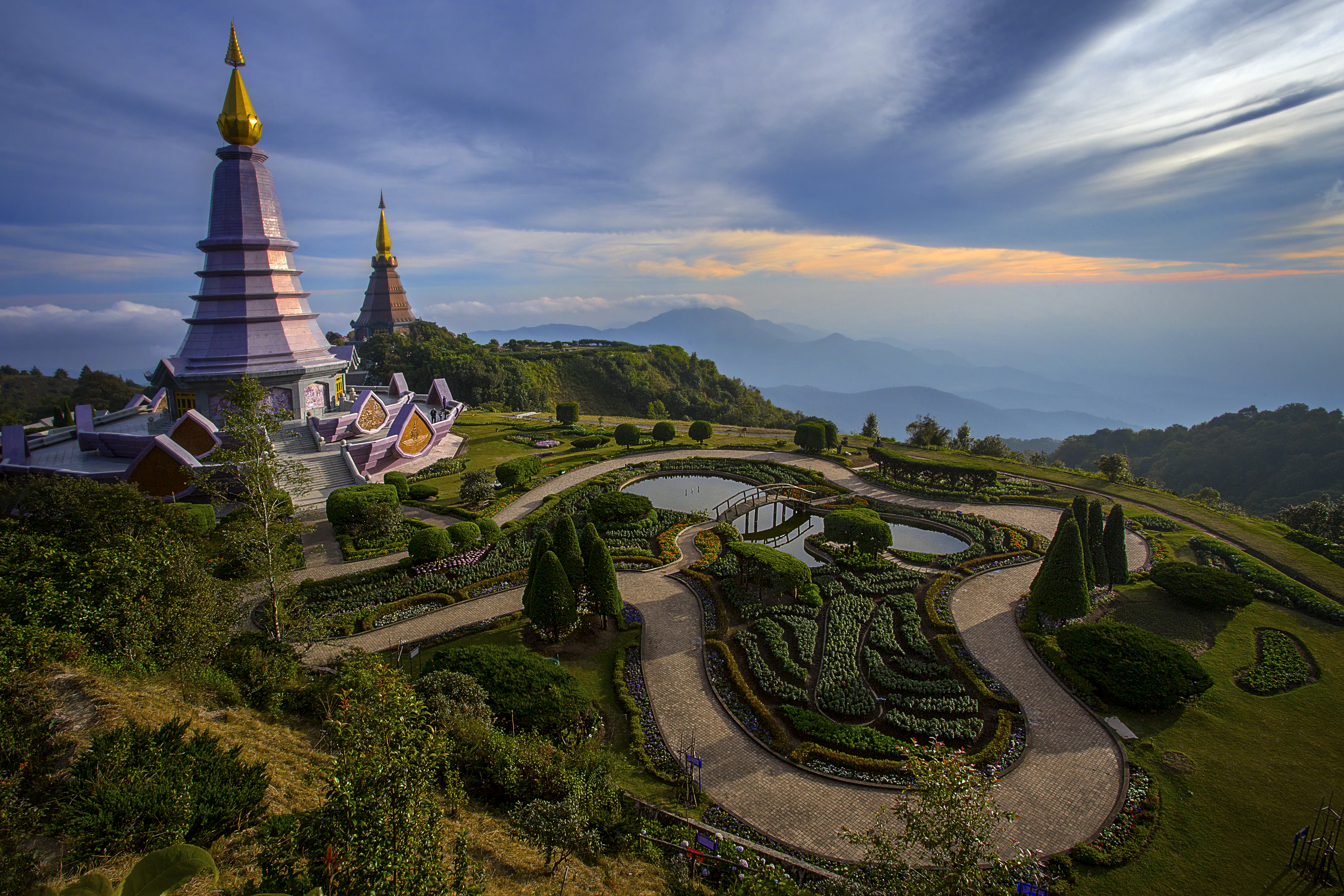
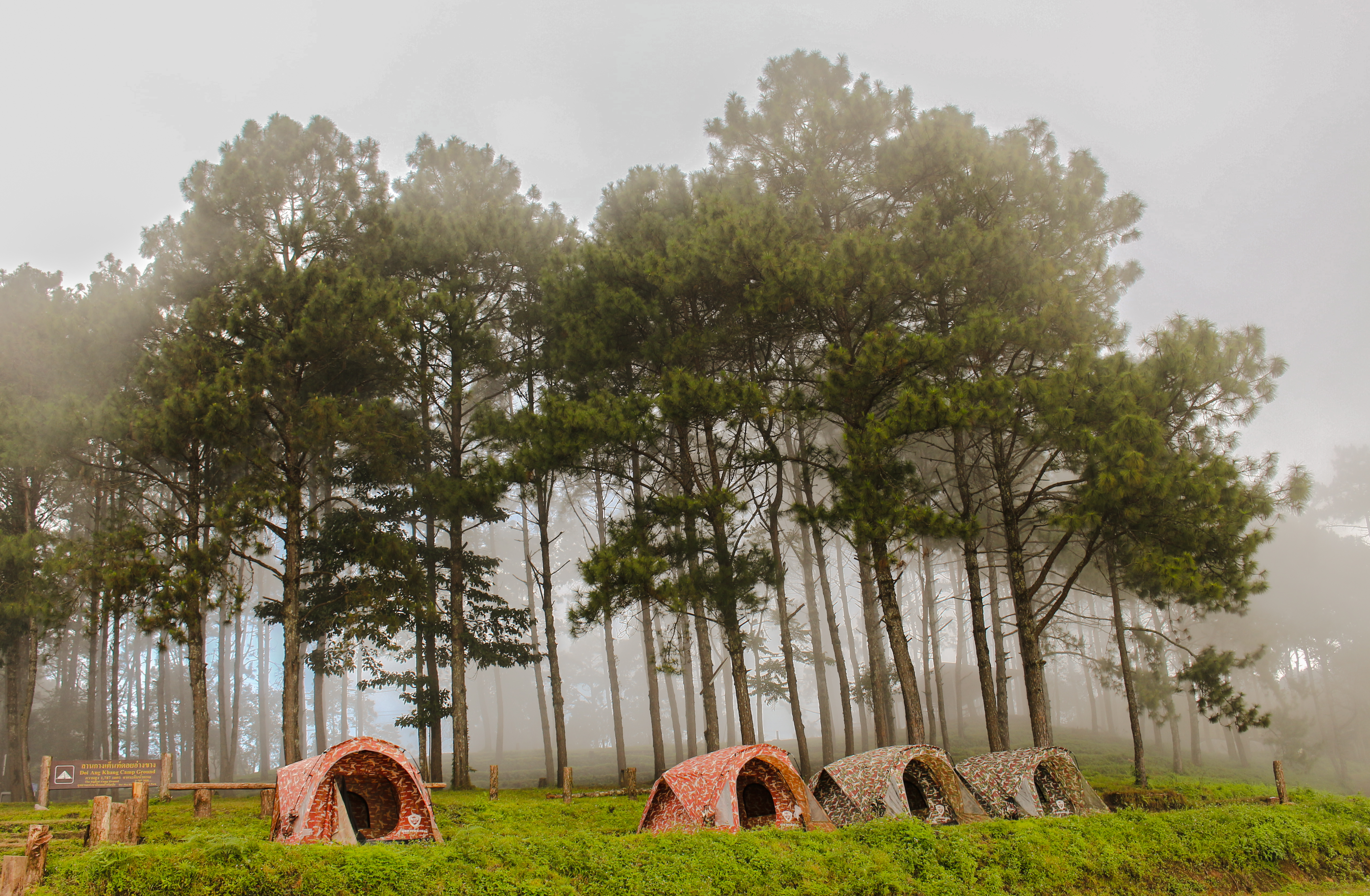
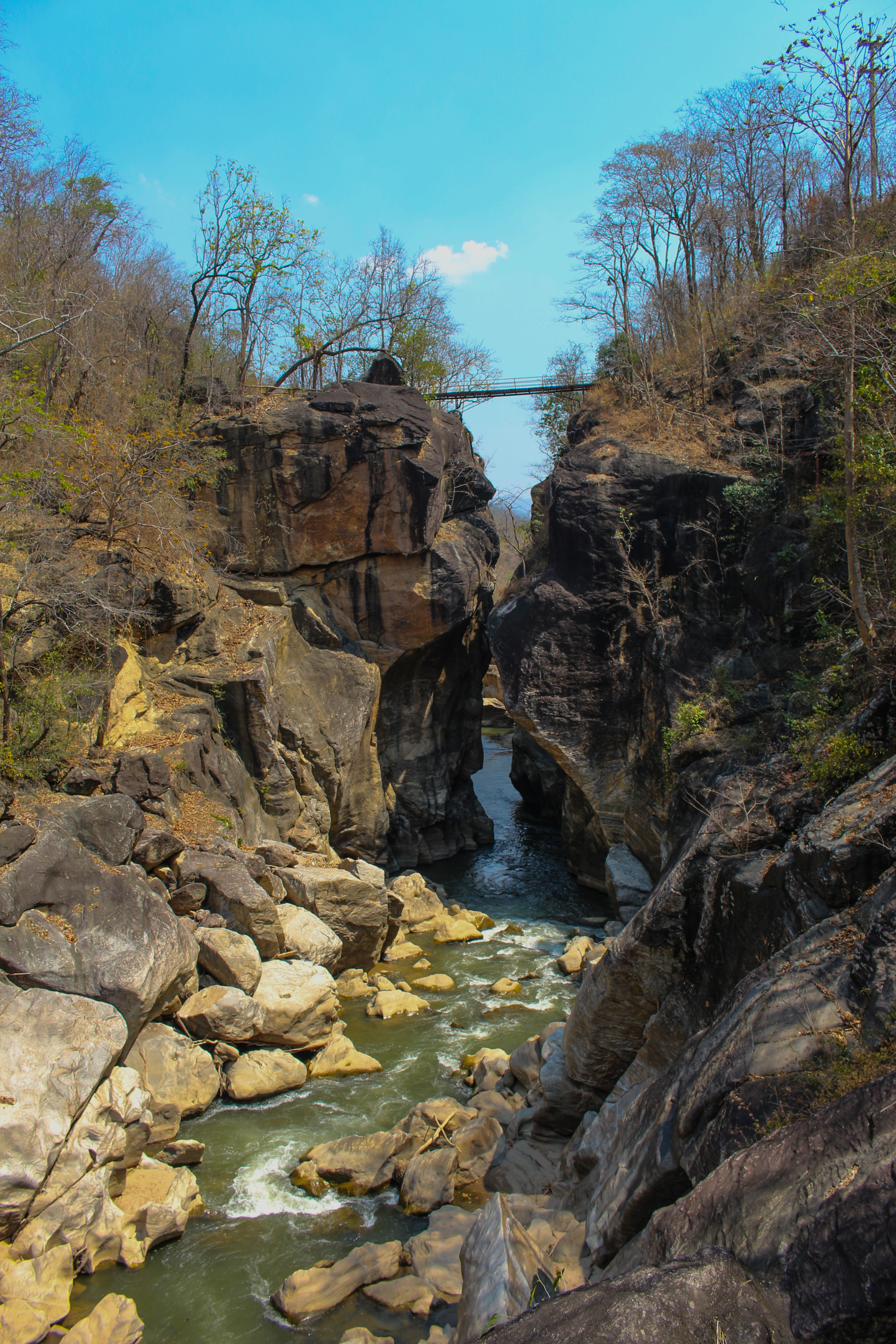
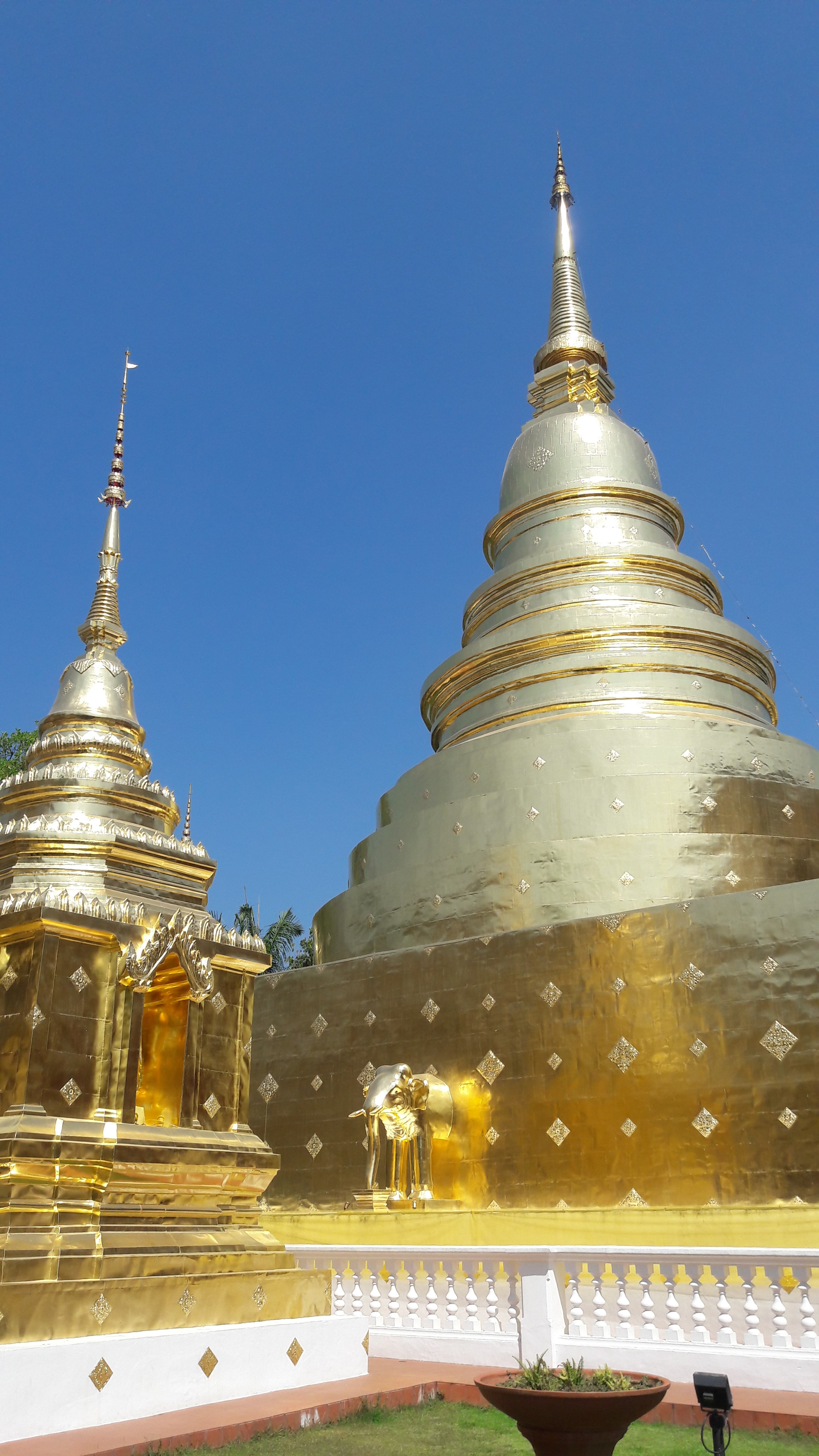
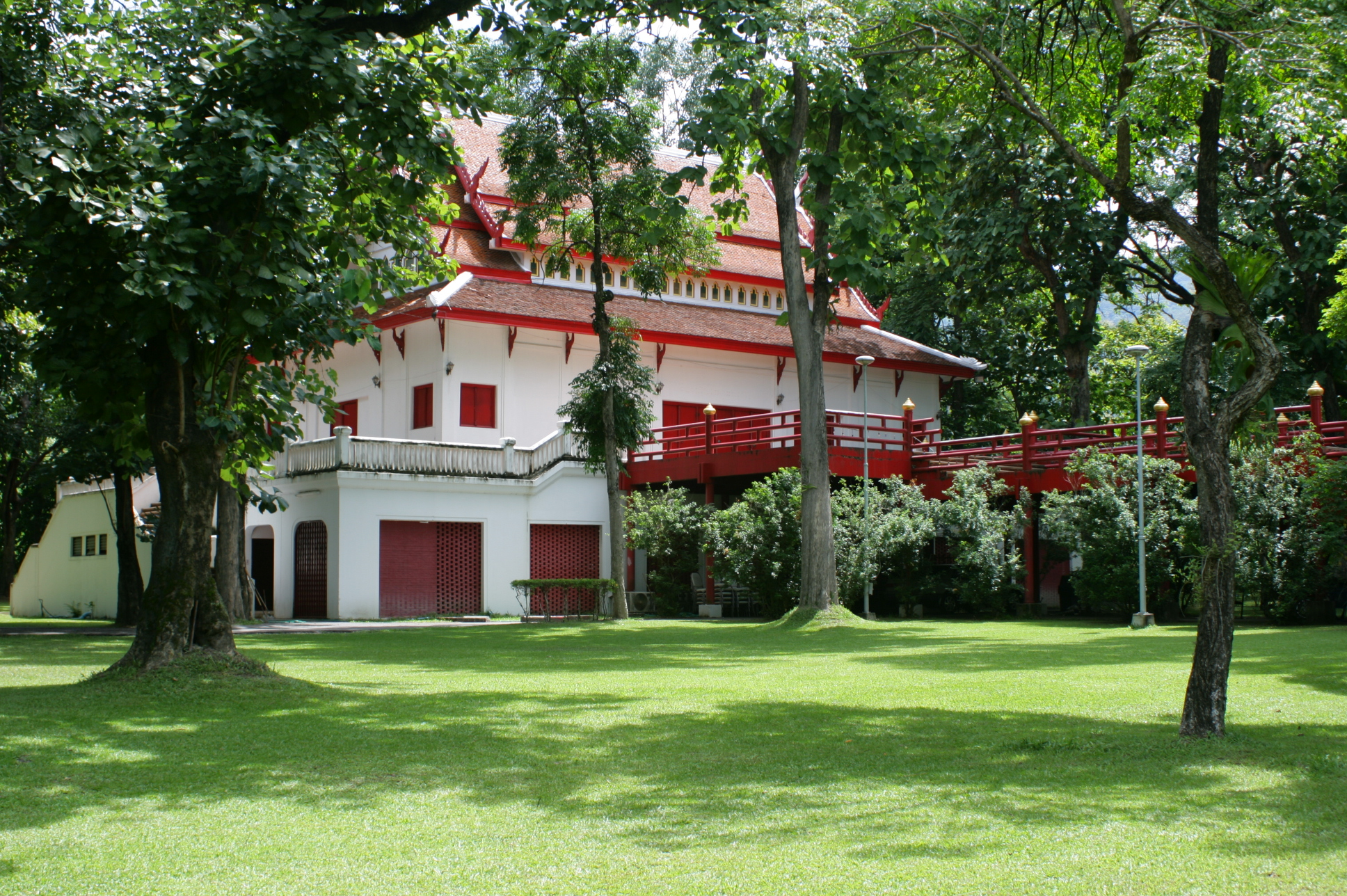
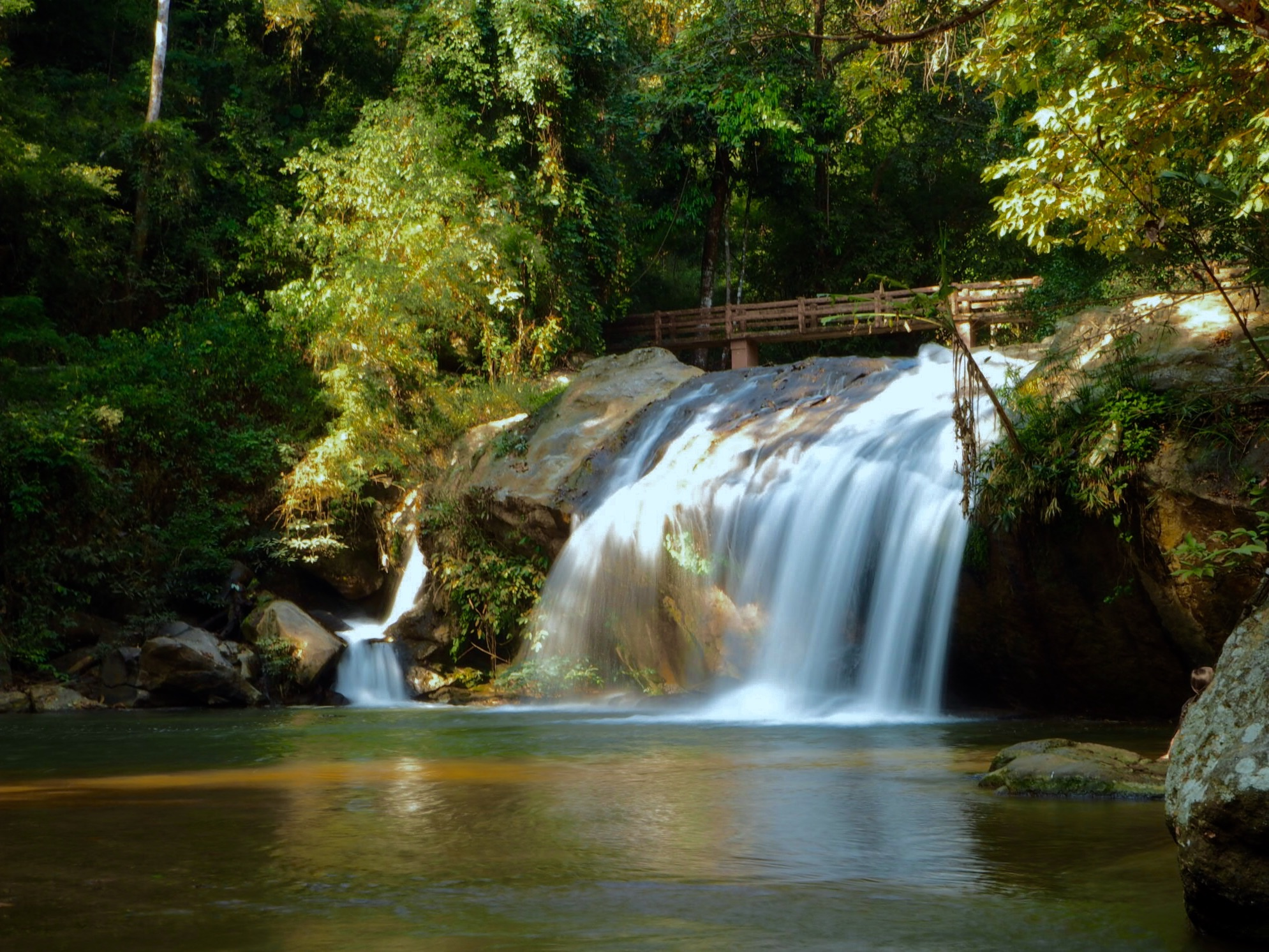
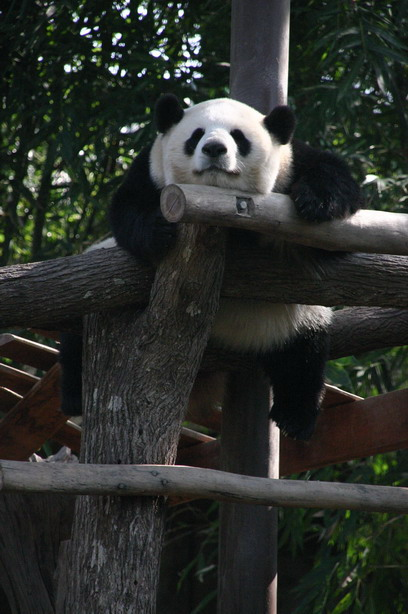
- From left to right, top to bottom : Wat Phra That Doi Suthep, Doi Inthanon, Doi Ang Khang, Op Luang National Park, Wat Phra Singh, Chiang Mai University, Mae Sa Waterfall, Chiang Mai Zoo

- Flag Seal
- Nickname: Nakhon Phing (Thai: นครพิงค์)
- Mottoes: ดอยสุเทพเป็นศรี ประเพณีเป็นสง่า บุปผชาติล้วนงามตา นามล้ำค่านครพิงค์ ("Famed Doi Suthep. Elegant traditions. Beautiful blossoms. Invaluable name of Nakhonphing.")
- Anthem: นครเชียงใหม่ Nakhon Chaing Mai (De facto)
- Chiang Mai in Thailand
- Coordinates: 18°50′14″N 98°58′14″E
- Country: Thailand
- Founder: Mangrai
- Capital: Chiang Mai

Government
  - Governor: Nirat Pongsitthaworn (since 2022)
  - PAO Chief Executive: Pichai Lertpongadisorn

Area
  - Total: 22,311 km^{2} (8,614 sq mi)
  - Rank: 1st

Population (2024)
  - Total: ▼1,799,019
  - Rank: 4th
  - Density: 80/km^{2} (210/sq mi)
  - Rank: 61st

Human Achievement Index
  - HAI (2022): 0.6179 "low" Ranked 68th

GDP
  - Total: baht 232 billion (US$8.0 billion) (2019)
- Time zone: UTC+7 (ICT)
- Postal code: 50xxx
- Calling code: 052 & 053
- ISO 3166 code: TH-50
- Vehicle registration: เชียงใหม่
- Accession into Siam (Thailand): 1910
- Website: chiangmai.go.th chiangmaipao.go.th

Chiang Mai province
- "Chiang Mai" in Thai language (top) and Northern Thai with Tai Tham script (bottom)

Thai name
- Thai: เชียงใหม่
- RTGS: Chiang Mai

Northern Thai name
- Northern Thai: ᨩ᩠ᨿᨦᩉᩲ᩠ᨾ᩵ [tɕīaŋ màj]

Chiang Mai (Note: Thai: เชียงใหม่, pronounced [tɕʰīaŋ màj]; Lanna: ᨩ᩠ᨿᨦᩉᩲ᩠ᨾ᩵, pronounced [tɕīaŋ màj]) is the largest province (changwat) of Thailand by area. It lies in upper northern Thailand and has a population of 1.78 million people. It is bordered by Chiang Rai to the northeast, Lampang and Lamphun to the south, Tak to the southwest, Mae Hong Son to the west, and Shan State of Burma to the north. The capital, Chiang Mai, is 685 kilometres (426 mi) north of Bangkok.

== Geography ==
Chiang Mai province is about 685 km (426 mi) from Bangkok in the Mae Ping River basin and is on average at 300 m (1,000 ft) elevation. Surrounded by the mountain ranges of the Thai highlands, it covers an area of approximately 22,311 km^{2} (9,000 sq mi). The mountains of the Daen Lao Range (ทิวเขาแดนลาว) at the north end of the province, the Thanon Thong Chai Range (เทือกเขาถนนธงชัย) with the highest mountain in Thailand, Doi Inthanon at 2,565 metres (8,415 ft), stretching in a north–south direction, and the Khun Tan Range in the east of the province are covered by rain forest. The Mae Ping, one of the major tributaries of the Chao Phraya River, originates in the Daen Lao mountains. Several national parks are in the province: Doi Inthanon, Doi Suthep-Pui, Ob Luang, Sri Lanna, Huai Nam Dang, Mae Wang, and Pha Daeng. The total forest area is 15,404 km^{2} (5,948 sq mi) or 69.6 percent of provincial area.

=== National parks ===
Fourteen of the fifteen national parks of region 16 (Chiang Mai), Mae Ping National Park is not in Chiang Mai province, form protected areas in Chiang Mai province. (Visitors in fiscal year 2024).

Si Lanna National Park	1,405 km^{2} (542 sq mi)	(89,382)
Huai Nam Dang National Park	1,252 km^{2} (483 sq mi)	(121,109)
Pha Daeng National Park	1,123 km^{2} (434 sq mi)	(39,534)
Op Luang National Park	553 km^{2} (214 sq mi)	(36,270)
Doi Pha Hom Pok National Park	524 km^{2} (202 sq mi)	(70,129)
Doi Inthanon National Park	482 km^{2} (186 sq mi)	(853,856)
Mae Tho National Park	433 km^{2} (167 sq mi)	(1,387)
Mae Takrai National Park	354 km^{2} (137 sq mi)	(24,983)
Doi Wiang Pha National Park	303 km^{2} (117 sq mi)	(939)
Doi Suthep–Pui National Park	257 km^{2} (99 sq mi)	(296,088)
Op Khan National Park	227 km^{2} (88 sq mi)	(98,972)
Khun Khan National Park	208 km^{2} (80 sq mi)	(18,053)
Mae Wang National Park	119 km^{2} (46 sq mi)	(66,042)
Namtok Bua Tong–	86 km^{2} (33 sq mi)	(385,316)
Namphu Chet Si National Park

=== Wildlife sanctuaries ===
Three of the four wildlife sanctuaries in region 16 (Chiang Mai), Omkoi wildlife sanctuary is not in Chiang mai province, form protected areas in Chiang Mai province.

Chiang Dao Wildlife Sanctuary	521 square kilometres (201 sq mi)
Mae Lao-Mae Sae Wildlife Sanctuary	514 square kilometres (198 sq mi)
Samoeng Wildlife Sanctuary	75 square kilometres (29 sq mi)

== Climate ==
Chiang Mai has a tropical wet and dry climate (Köppen Aw), tempered by the low latitude and moderate elevation, with warm to hot weather year-round, though nighttime conditions during the dry season can be cool and are much lower than daytime highs. The maximum temperature ever recorded is 42.4 °C (108.3 °F) in May 2005.

== Demographics ==
Of the population, 13.4 percent in the province are members of hill tribes

- Northern Thai people or Tai Yuan native to nine provinces in Northern Thailand, principally in the area of the former kingdom of Lan Na.
- Tai Lue live in dwellings of usually only a single room wooden house built on high poles. They are skilled in weaving.
- Tai Yai, Burmese in origin, harvest rice, farm, raise cattle and trade. Their craftsmanship lies in weaving, pottery, wood carving and bronze ware.
- Akha the largest population of any hill tribe in the region. Originating from Tibet and Southern China, they dwell on high ground around 1,200 metres (3,937 ft) above sea-level. Within their villages they build a spirit gateway to protect them from evil spirits.
- Hmong from southern China. Prefer higher elevations. They raise livestock and grow rice, corn, tobacco, and cabbage. Known for their embroidery and silver.
- Karen occupy valleys and riverbanks.
- Lahu from southern China and live in high areas. They are known as hunters and planters.
- Lisu from southern China and Tibet are renowned for their colorful dress and also build their dwellings on high poles. They harvest rice and corn and their men are skilled in hunting.
- Yao reside on mountainsides and grow corn and other crops. They are skilled blacksmiths, silversmiths and embroiders.
- Mon native to Haripuñjaya Where the capital was at Lamphun

== Symbols ==
The seal of the province shows a white elephant in a glass pavilion. The white elephant is a royal symbol in Thailand, and it is depicted to remember the offering of a white elephant by Thammalangka, a ruler of Chiang Mai, to his overlord, King Rama II of Bangkok. The pavilion symbolizes that Buddhism prospered in Chiang Mai, especially when in 1477 the teachings of Buddha, the Tripitaka, were reviewed.

The provincial flower and tree is the "flame of the forest" (Butea monosperma). The edible cyprinid fish "black sharkminnow" (Labeo chrysophekadion) is the provincial aquatic life.

The provincial slogan is "In the shadow of Mount Doi Suthep, blessed with rice customs and traditions, beautiful wild flowers, magnificent Nakhon Phing".

== History ==
The city of Chiang Mai, the capital of Chiang Mai province, was also capital of the Lanna Kingdom after its founding in 1296, during the same period of time as the establishment of the Sukhothai Kingdom. From then, Chiang Mai not only became the capital and cultural core of the Lanna Kingdom, but also the centre of Buddhism in northern Thailand. King Meng Rai built many temples in the region.

In 1558, Chiang Mai became a colony of the First Toungoo Empire. Chiang Mai remained its colony for more than 200 years, until the Burmese–Siamese War (1775–1776). In 1774 the Burmese colonial regime were finally driven out of Chiang Mai by a coalition of Lanna and Siamese forces and it then became a tributary state of Siam, which later installed a Lanna chieftain ally, Kawila, to independently rule over Lampang and Chiang Mai region as a monarch.

During the reign of King Rama V of Siam, under his administrative centralization policy, Chiang Mai lost its independence, was annexed and became a second level subdivision of Siam.

From 1933 on, Chiang Mai received its status as a "province" of Siam and has remained so until the present day.

Historical affiliations

Kingdom of Ngoenyang before 1292
Kingdom of Lanna 1292–1579
Kingdom of Lanna 1579–1775
Thonburi occupation 1775–1782
Siamese occupation 1782–1802
Kingdom of Chiang Mai 1802–1899
Kingdom of Siam 1899–1932
Kingdom of Thailand 1932–present

== Religion ==
Religion in Chiang Mai
1. Buddhism 83.26 (82.0%)
2. Christianity 15.8 (15.6%)
3. Islam 0.58 (0.57%)
4. Hinduism 1.58 (1.56%)
5. Confucianism 0.02 (0.02%)
6. Sikhism 0.1 (0.10%)
7. Not Religious 0.14 (0.14%)
8. Unknown 0.01 (0.01%)
9. Other 0.03 (0.03%)

== Administrative divisions and postal codes ==
Map of twenty five districts

Chiang Mai is subdivided into 25 districts (amphoe). The districts are further divided into 204 subdistricts (tambon) and 2,066 villages (muban).

The number after each district name indicates its postal code.

1. Mueang Chiang Mai: 50000
2. Chom Thong: 50160
3. Mae Chaem: 50270
4. Chiang Dao: 50170
5. Doi Saket: 50220
6. Mae Taeng: 50150
7. Mae Rim: 50180
8. Samoeng: 50250
9. Fang: 50110
10. Mae Ai: 50280
11. Phrao: 50190
12. San Pa Tong: 50120
13. San Kamphaeng: 50130
14. San Sai: 50210
15. Hang Dong: 50230
16. Hot: 50240
17. Doi Tao: 50260
18. Omkoi: 50310
19. Saraphi: 50140
20. Wiang Haeng: 50350
21. Chai Prakan: 50320
22. Mae Wang: 50360
23. Mae On: 50130
24. Doi Lo: 50160
25. Galyani Vadhana: 50270

=== Local government ===
As of 26 November 2019 there are: one Chiang Mai Provincial Administration Organisation (ongkan borihan suan changwat) and 121 municipal (thesaban) areas in the province. Chiang Mai has city (thesaban nakhon) status. Mae Jo, Mae Hia, Mueang Kaen Phatthana and Ton Pao have town (thesaban mueang) status. Further 116 subdistrict municipalities (thesaban tambon). The non-municipal areas are administered by 89 Subdistrict Administrative Organisations - SAO (ongkan borihan suan tambon).

== Human achievement index 2022 ==
Health	Education	Employment	Income
65	25	66	50
Housing	Family	Transport	Participation
70	42	67	12
Province Chiang Mai, with an HAI 2022 value of 0.6179 is "low", occupies place 68in the ranking.

Since 2003, the United Nations Development Programme (UNDP) in Thailand has tracked progress on human development at sub-national level using the Human achievement index (HAI), a composite index covering all the eight key areas of human development. The National Economic and Social Development Board (NESDB) took over this task in 2017.

Rank	Classification
1–13	"High"
14–29	"Somewhat high"
30–45	"Average"
46–61	"Somewhat low"
62–77	"Low"

Map with provinces and HAI 2022 rankings

== Transportation ==
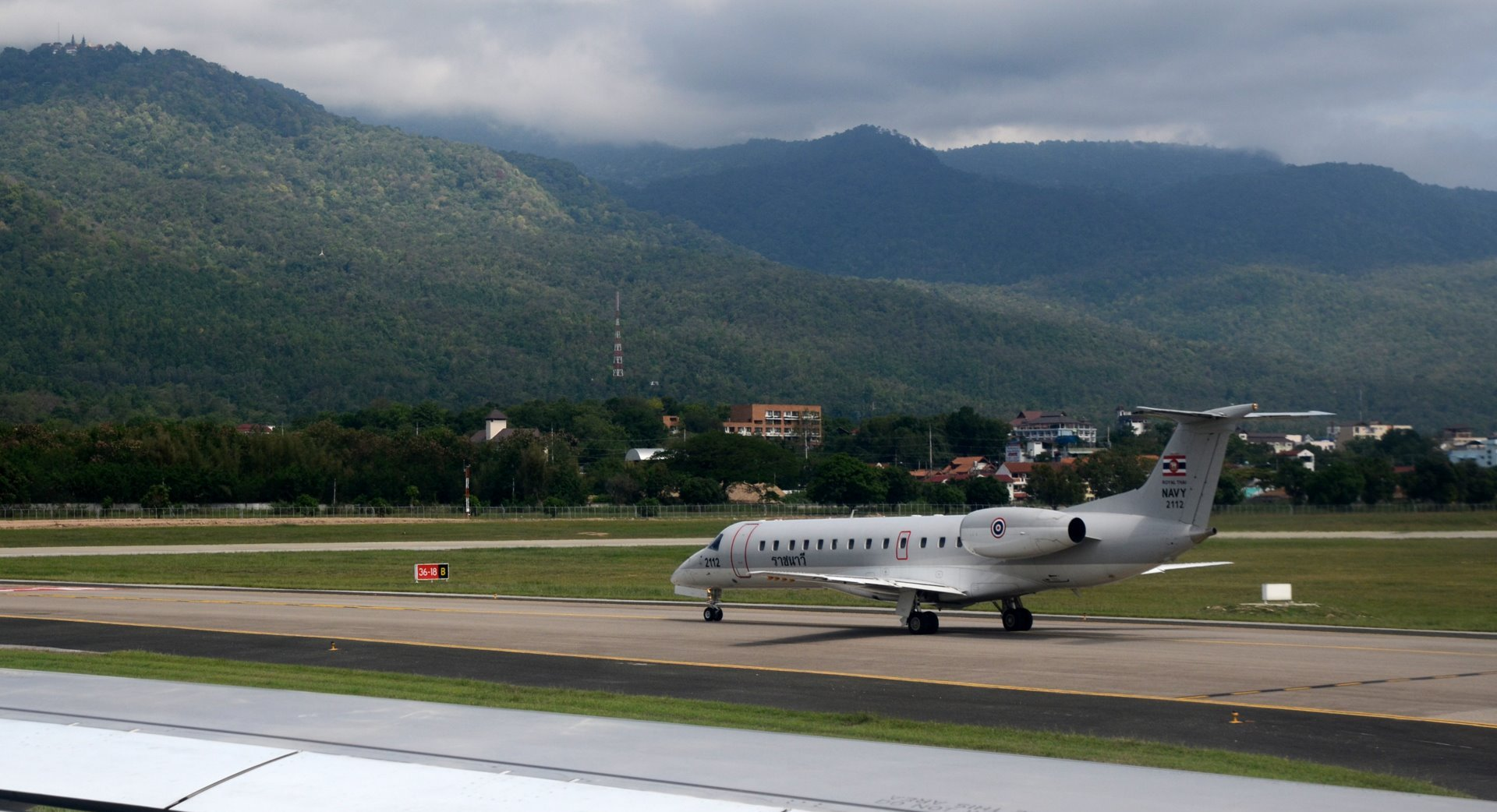
Chiang Mai International Airport showing Doi Suthep temple in the upper left corner

- Road: Chiang Mai is on Highway 11, the only 2-digit road number in the province. Other roads connect the city of Chiang Mai with the north and south of the province, as well as with the east towards Chiang Rai province.
- Train: Chiang Mai railway station is the northern terminus of the Northern Line, operated by the State Railway of Thailand.
- Air: Chiang Mai International Airport (CNX) is one of the seven Thai international airports under the aegis of the Airports of Thailand Public Company Limited (AOT). As Chiang Mai International Airport is the major gateway to northern Thailand, it plays an important role in promoting travel and tourism throughout the northern region. Today, 14 airlines serve the airport and more than 3,000,000 passengers, 15,000 flights, and 16,000 tons of cargo are handled annually.
- Songthaew

== Tourism ==
Chiang Mai province is the tourist hub of the north and one of Thailand's most important tourist destinations. It is considered one of the most scenic provinces in the country due to its mountain ranges, valleys, flora, and fauna. For example, the Hang Dong Canyon is coveted as a great tourist attraction. Furthermore, unlike most of Thailand, in some months, the climate in the north and Chiang Mai is cool.

=== Location protected areas ===
Overview protected areas of Chiang Mai

Chiang Mai protected areas

	National park
1	Doi Inthanon
2	Doi Pha Hom Pok
3	Doi Suthep-Pui
4	Doi Wiang Pha
5	Huai Nam Dang
6	Khun Khan
7	Mae Takhrai
8	Mae Tho
9	Mae Wang

10	Namtok Bua Tong
11	Op Khan
12	Op Luang
13	Pha Daeng
14	Si Lanna
	Wildlife sanctuary
15	Chiang Dao
16	Mae Lao-Mae Sae
17	Samoeng

== Health ==
Each amphoe of Chiang Mai has its own hospital, but among the largest are located in Mueang Chiang Mai District and include Maharaj Nakorn Chiang Mai Hospital and Nakornping Hospital.

== Local products ==
Chiang Mai is a handicrafts centre, with a variety of antiques, silver jewellery, and embroidery, Thai silks and cottons, basketry, celadon, silverware, furniture, lacquerware, woodcarvings, and parasols.

== Local culture ==
The north of Thailand's culture is Lanna in origin and the people are proud of their northern roots. The region is home to distinctive foods, music, arts, way of life, and even language. Chiang Mai is home to various hill tribes and their own distinctive cultures.

=== Local food ===
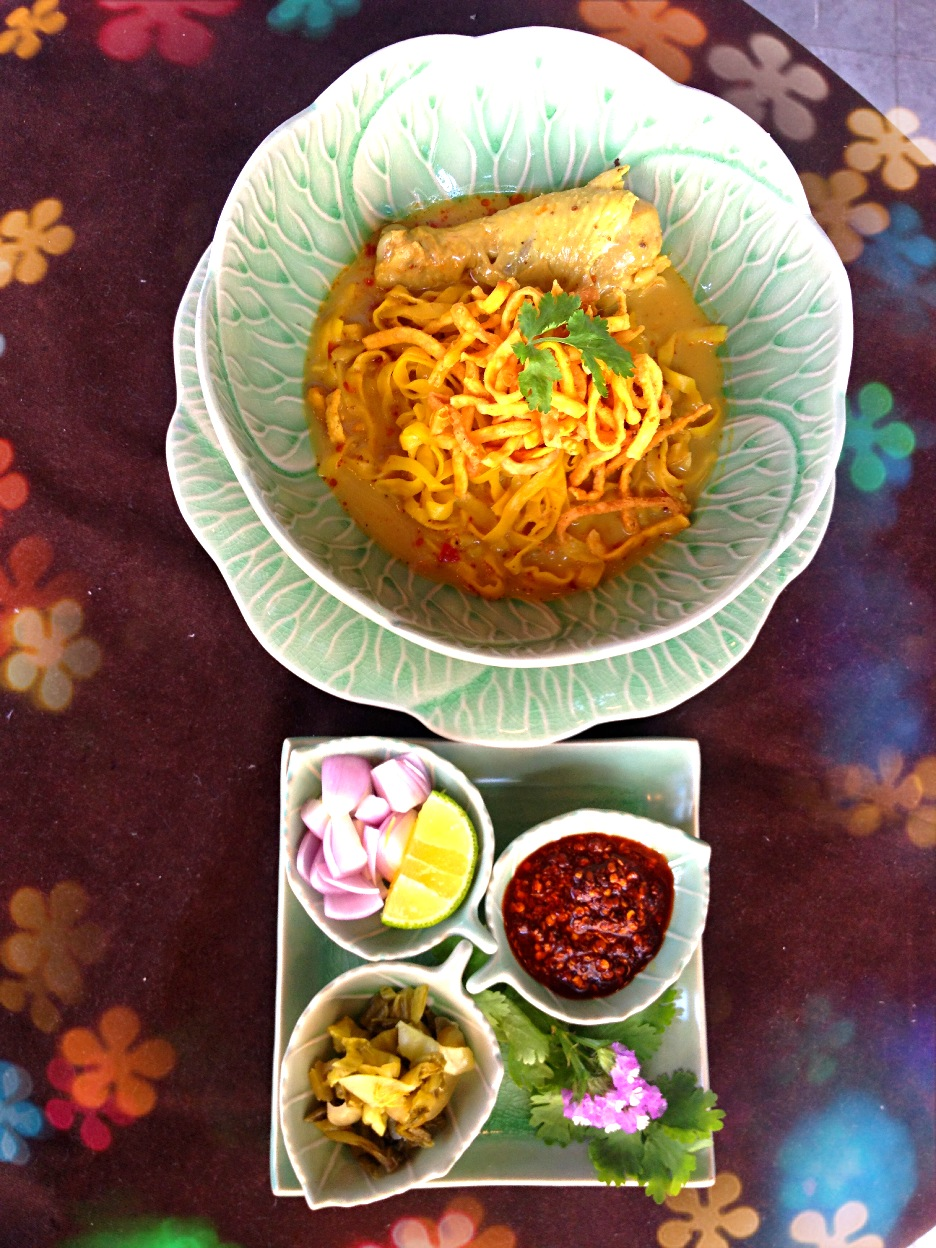
Khao soi

- Nam phrik ong is a type of Nam phrik chili paste which is made of minced pork and tomatoes. It is usually eaten with soft-boiled vegetables, pork crackling, or deep-fried crunchy rice cakes.
- Nam phrik num meaning "chili paste young man", is another kind of paste which can be eaten with pork crackling.
- Sai ua is a local sausage that is very aromatic and spicy and is usually eaten with sticky rice.
- Kaeng meaning "curry", is not made with coconut milk in the north.
  - Kaeng hang-le is northern-style pork curry
  - Kaeng om is a spicy curry consisting of intestines
  - Kaeng khae is a spicy curry consisting mainly of vegetables.
- Khanom chin nam ngiao is a traditional northern noodle dish with chicken or pork.
- Khao soi is a noodle dish which can be made from chicken, pork, or beef made with coconut milk and garnished with chopped fresh shallots, pickled cabbage, chilli paste to taste, and a slice of fresh lime.

== Sports ==
There are two main sport stadia in Chiang Mai and its environs: 700th Anniversary Stadium and Province Stadium. 700th Anniversary Stadium is on Klongchonpratan Road, 7 km (4.3 mi) from Chiang Mai University. There are swimming pools, diving pool, basketball arena, and 11 tennis courts.

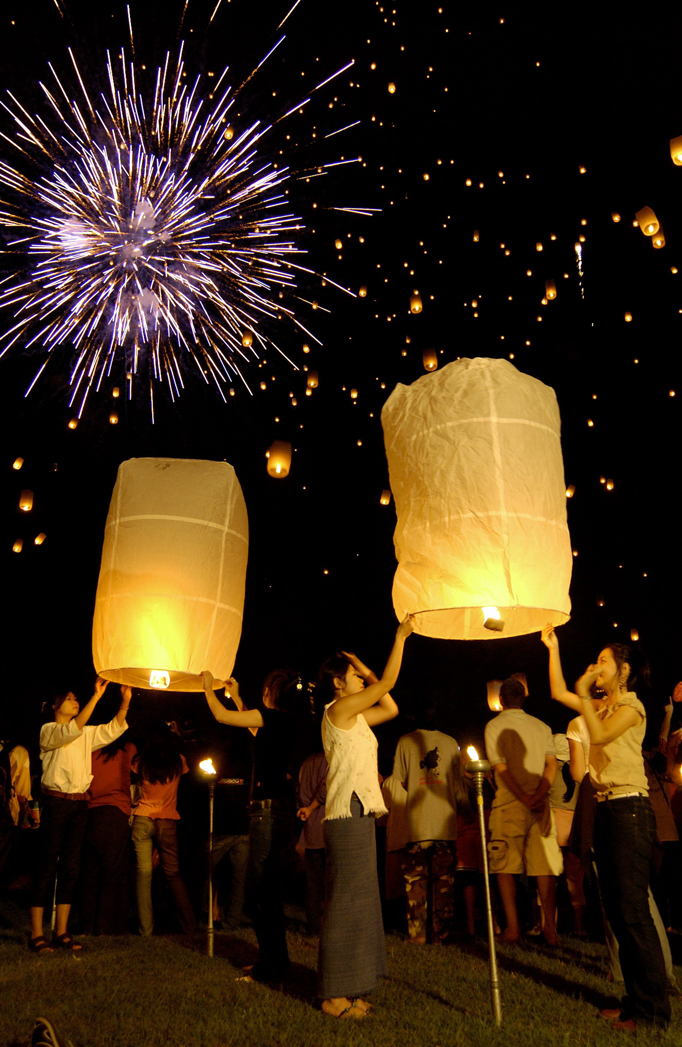
Chiang Mai, Yi Peng Festival

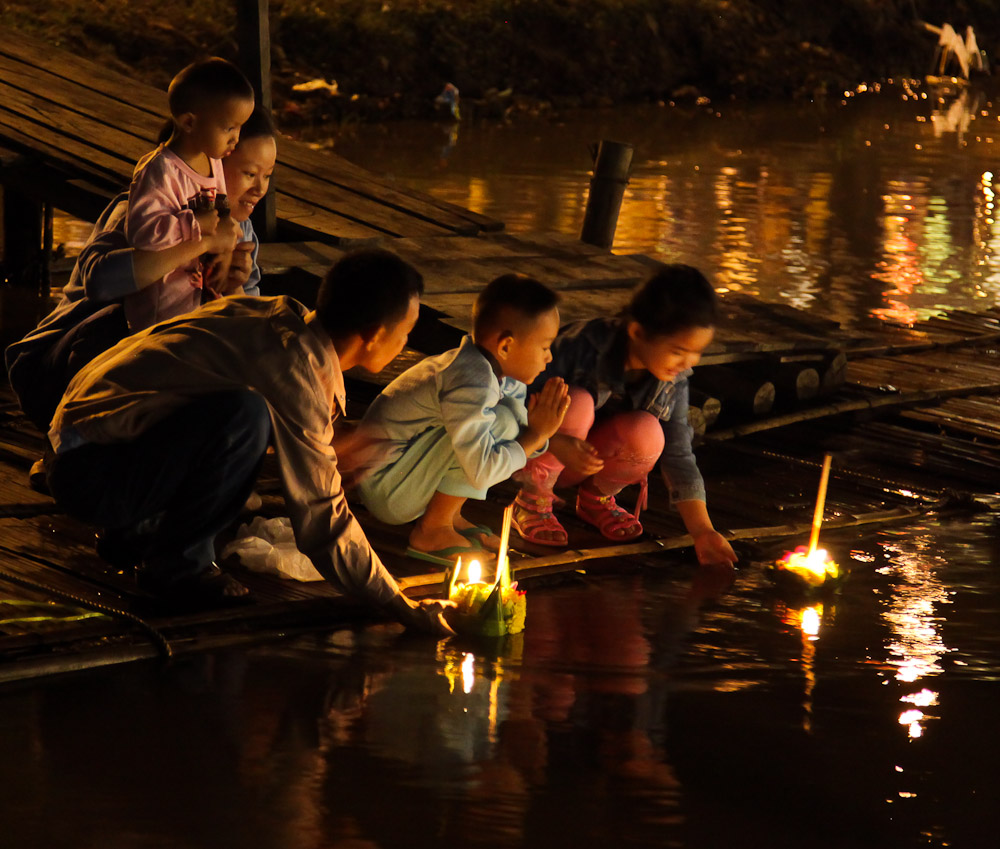
People floating krathong rafts during the Loi Krathong festival in Chiang Mai

== Sister cities ==
The province is twinned with eight provinces/states.

- Shanghai, China (2000)
- Yogyakarta, Indonesia (2007)
- Qingdao, China (2008)
- Chongqing, China (2008)
- Hokkaido, Japan (2013)
- Bursa, Turkey (2013)
- Chiang Tung, Myanmar (2014)
- Chengdu, China (2015)

== Notable inhabitants ==
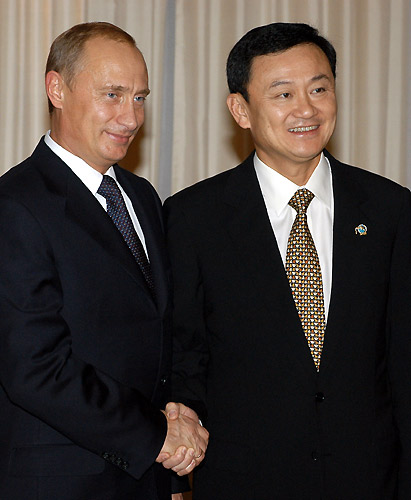
Thaksin Shinawatra with Vladimir Putin at APEC Thailand 2003, Thaksin was born in San Kamphaeng District

- Thaksin Shinawatra (Thai: ทักษิณ ชินวัตร) (born 1949), politician and businessman
- Yingluck Shinawatra (Thai: ยิ่งลักษณ์ ชินวัตร) (born 1967), politician

== Gallery ==
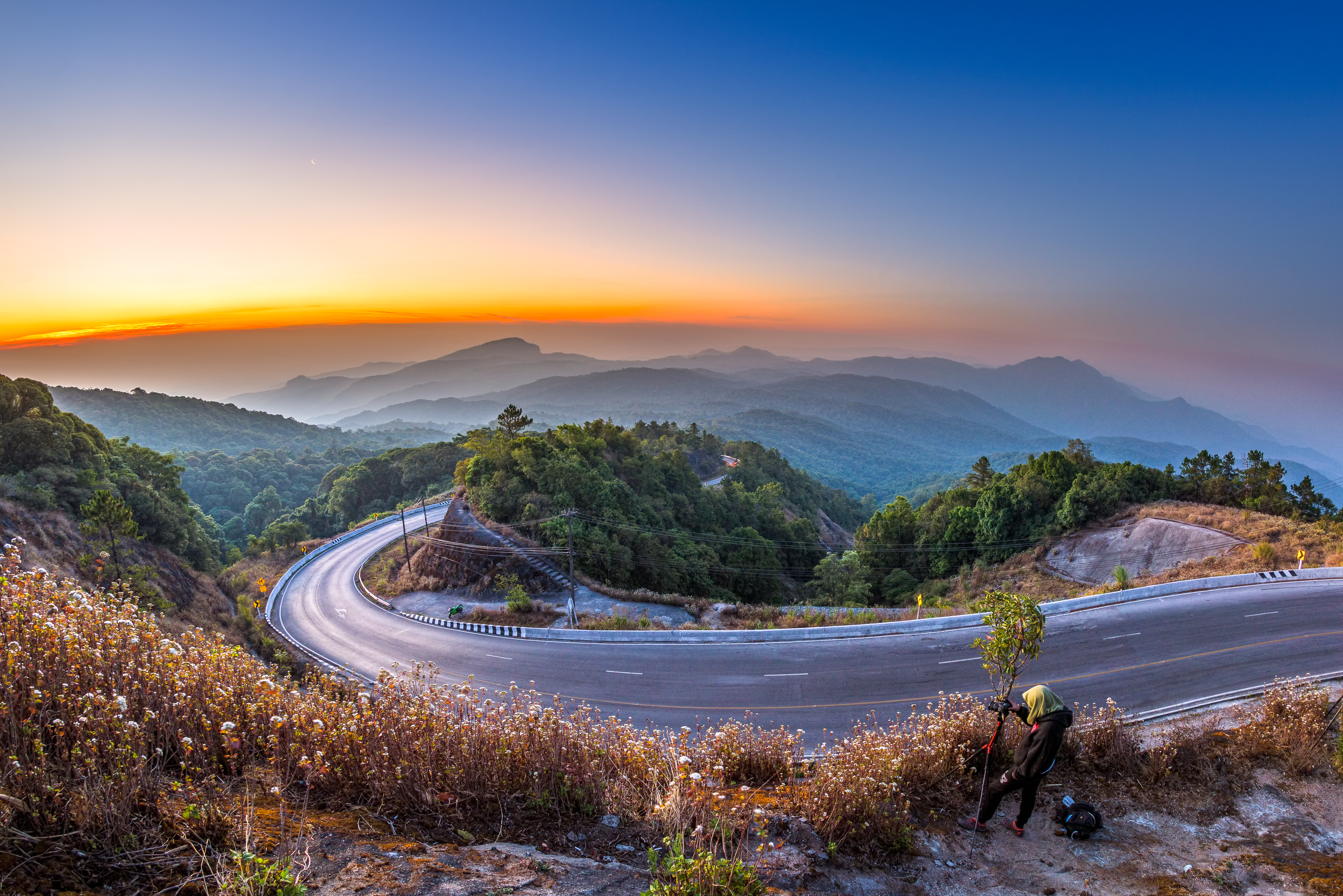
The viewpoint at the 41st km of the Highway 1009, Doi Inthanon

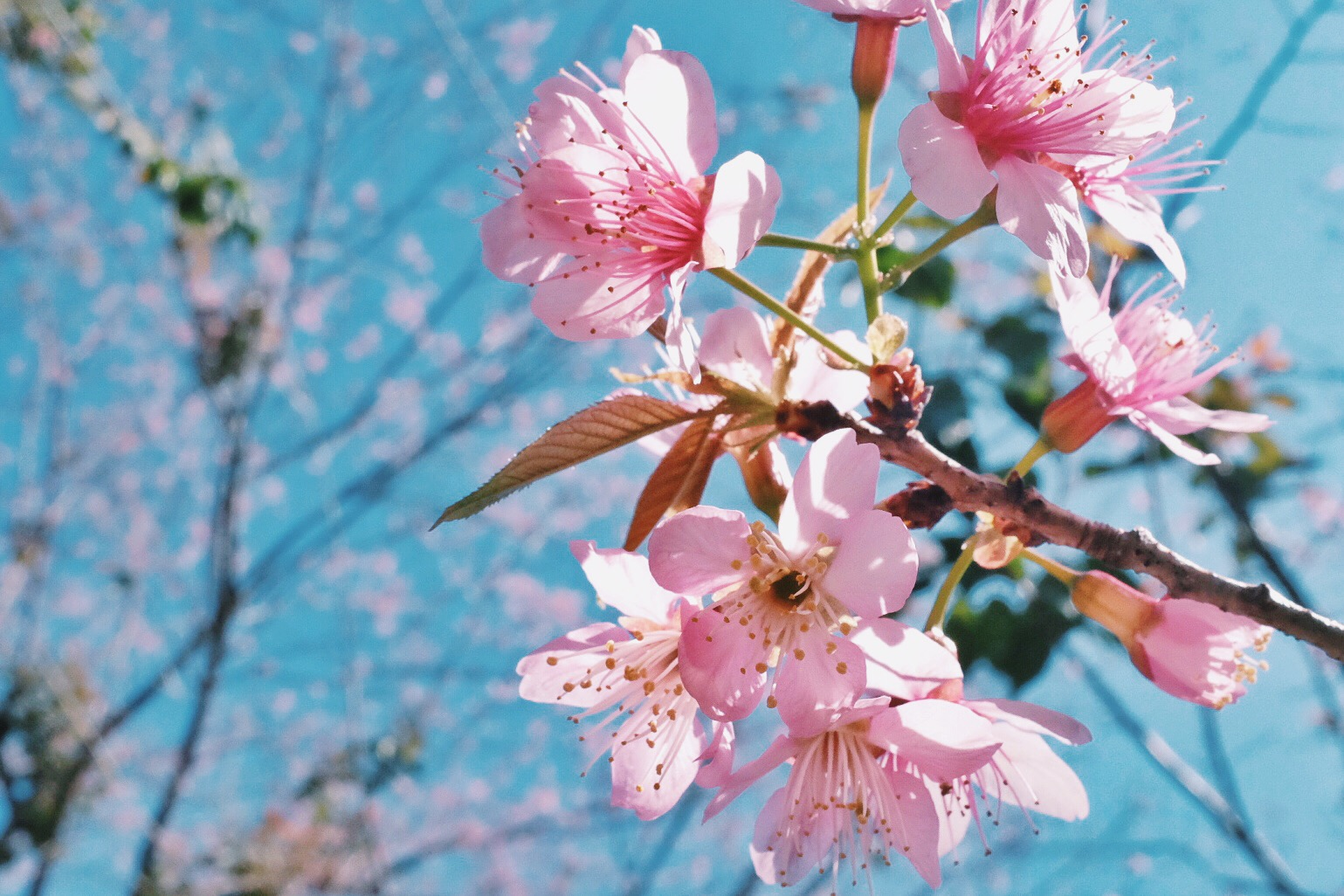
Prunus cerasoides blooming at Doi Suthep–Pui National Park

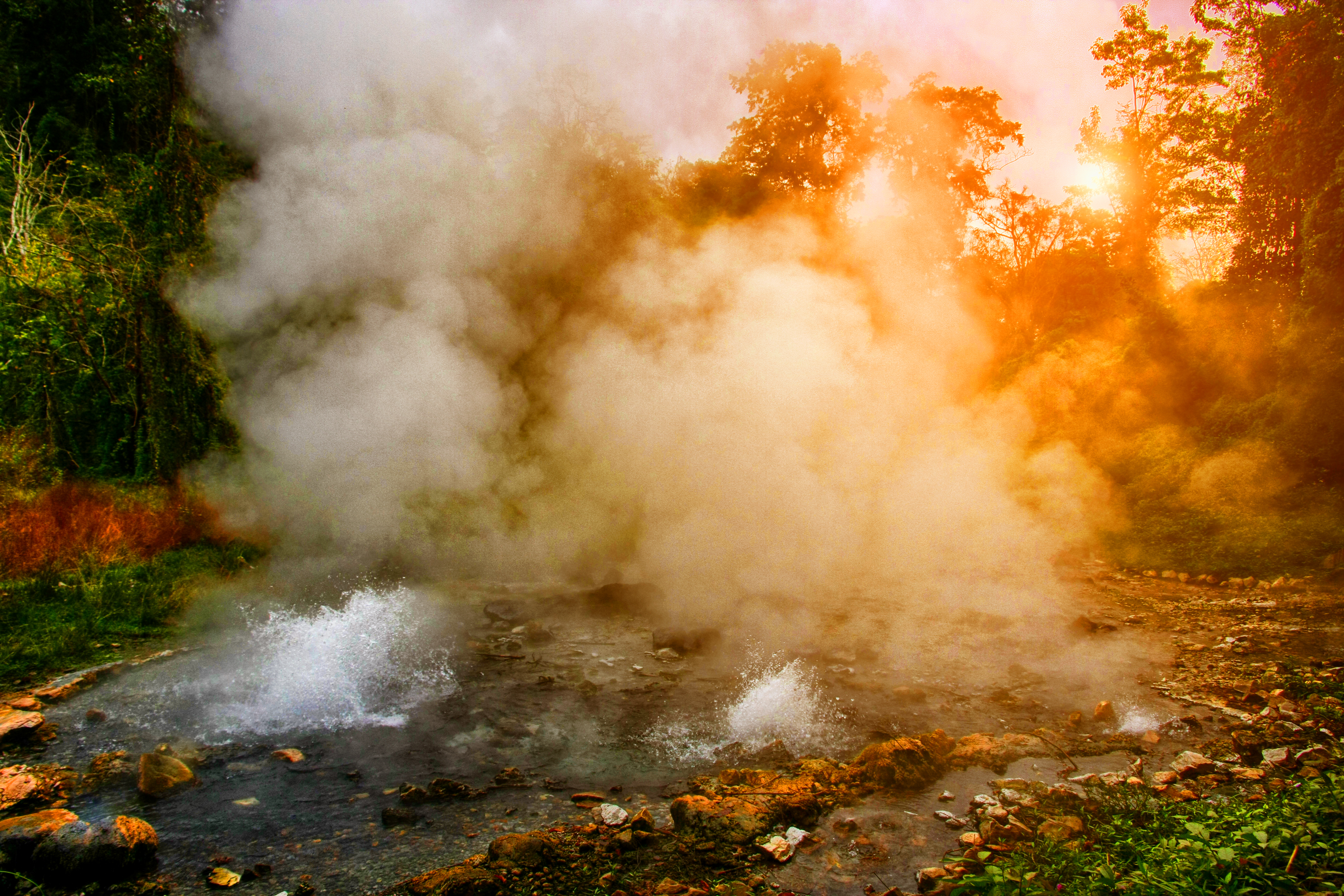
Pong Dueat Hot Springs, Huai Nam Dang National Park

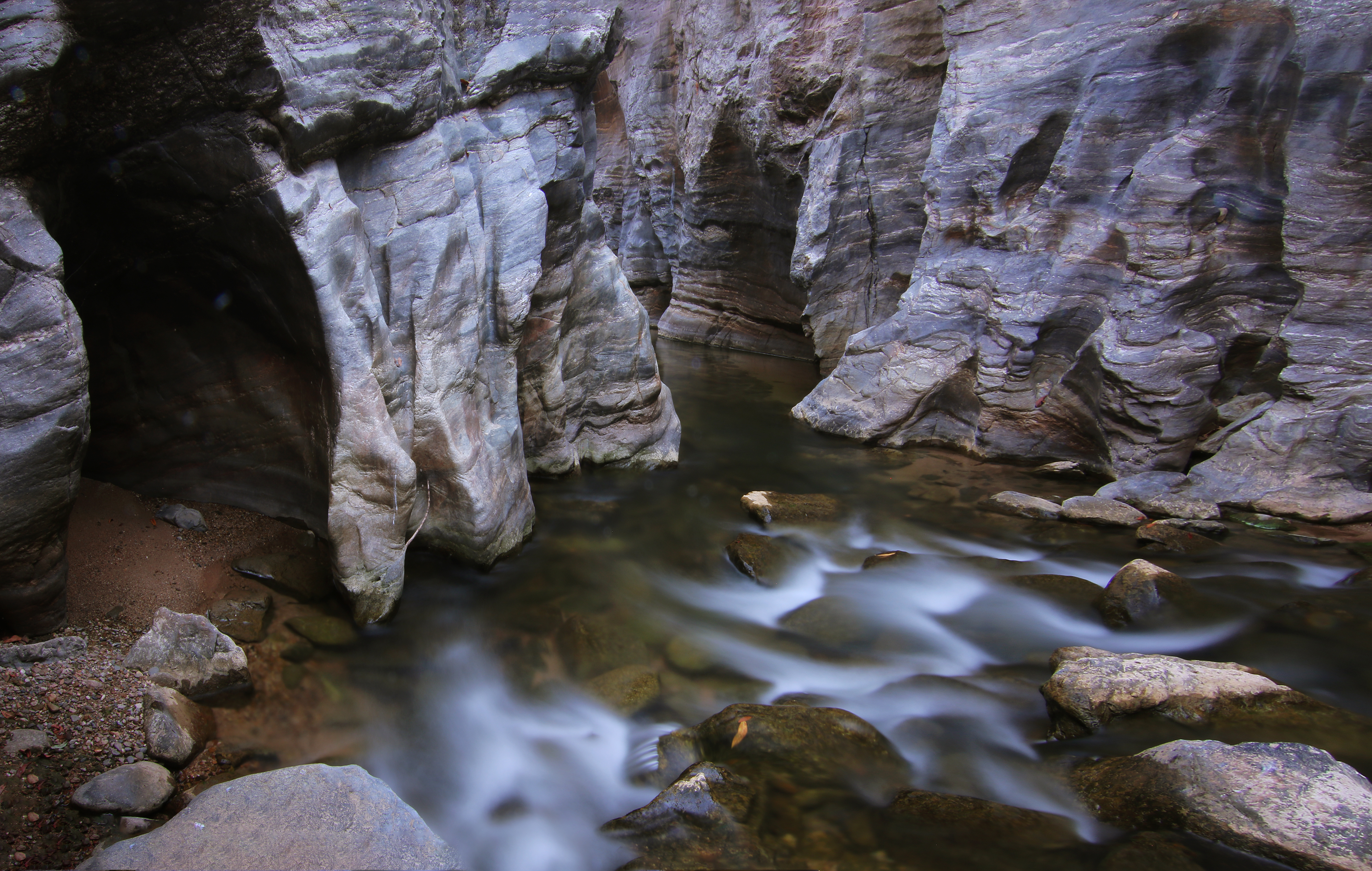
Ob Khan National Park

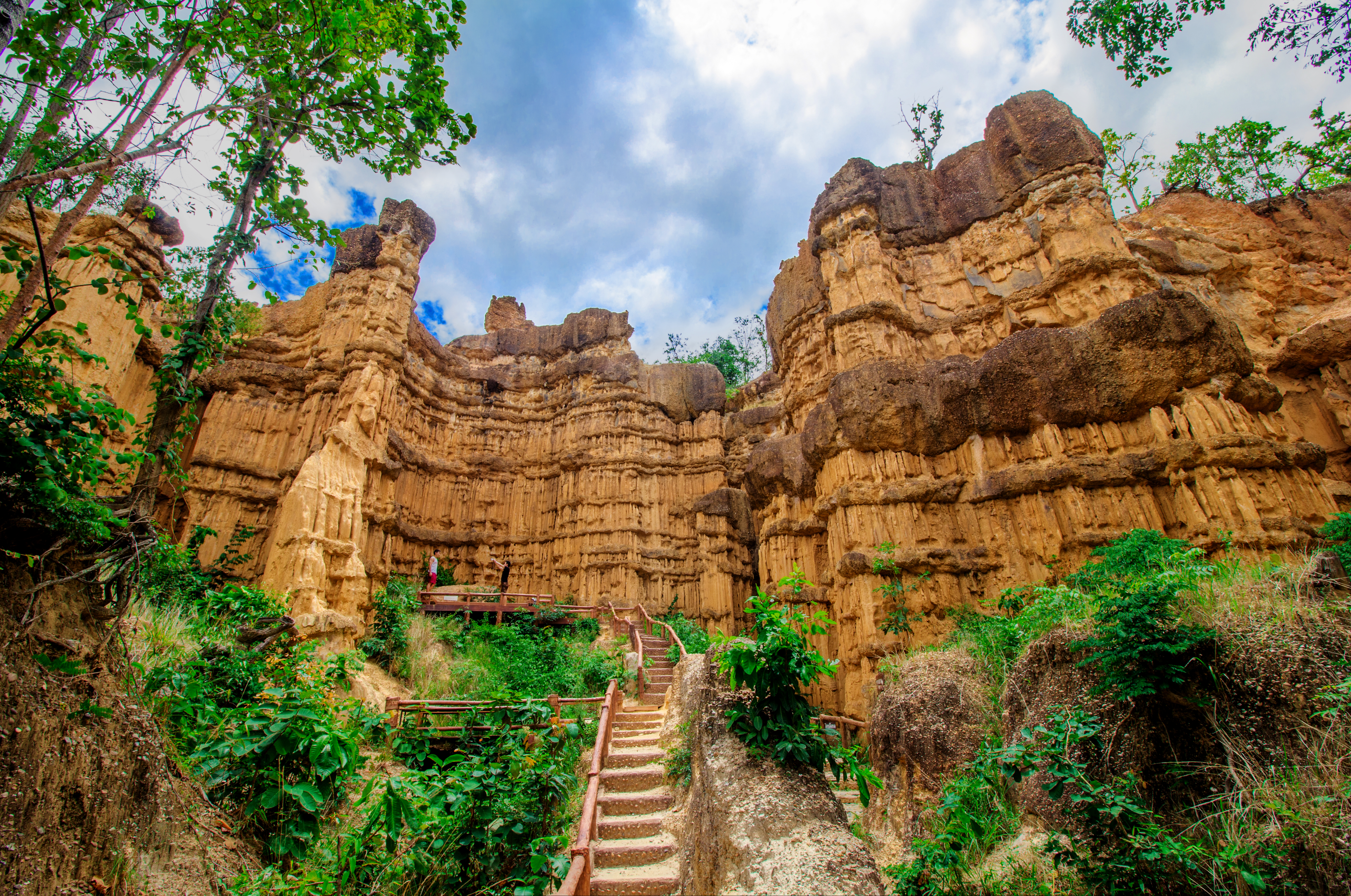
Mae Wang National park

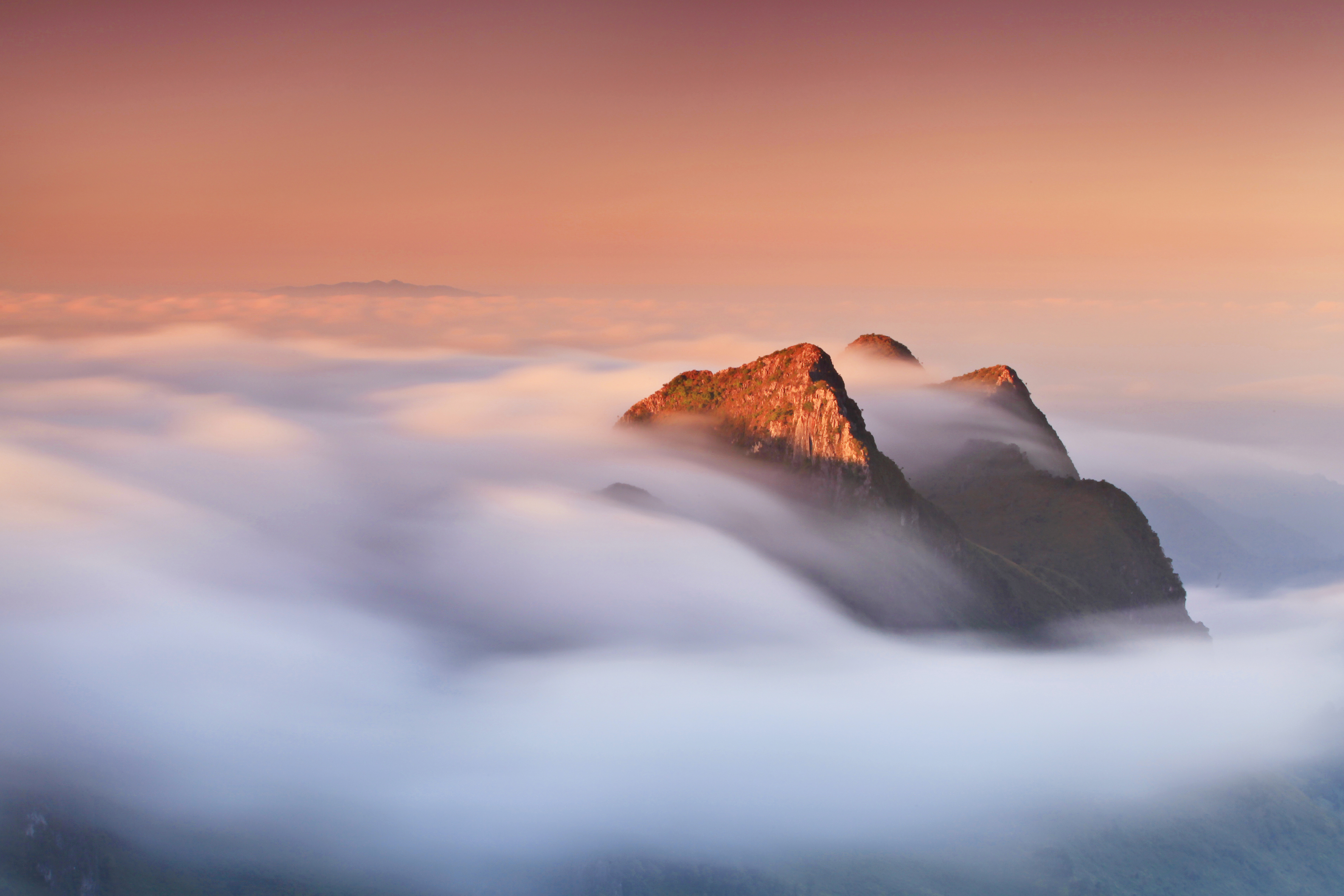
Doi Chiang Dao mountain

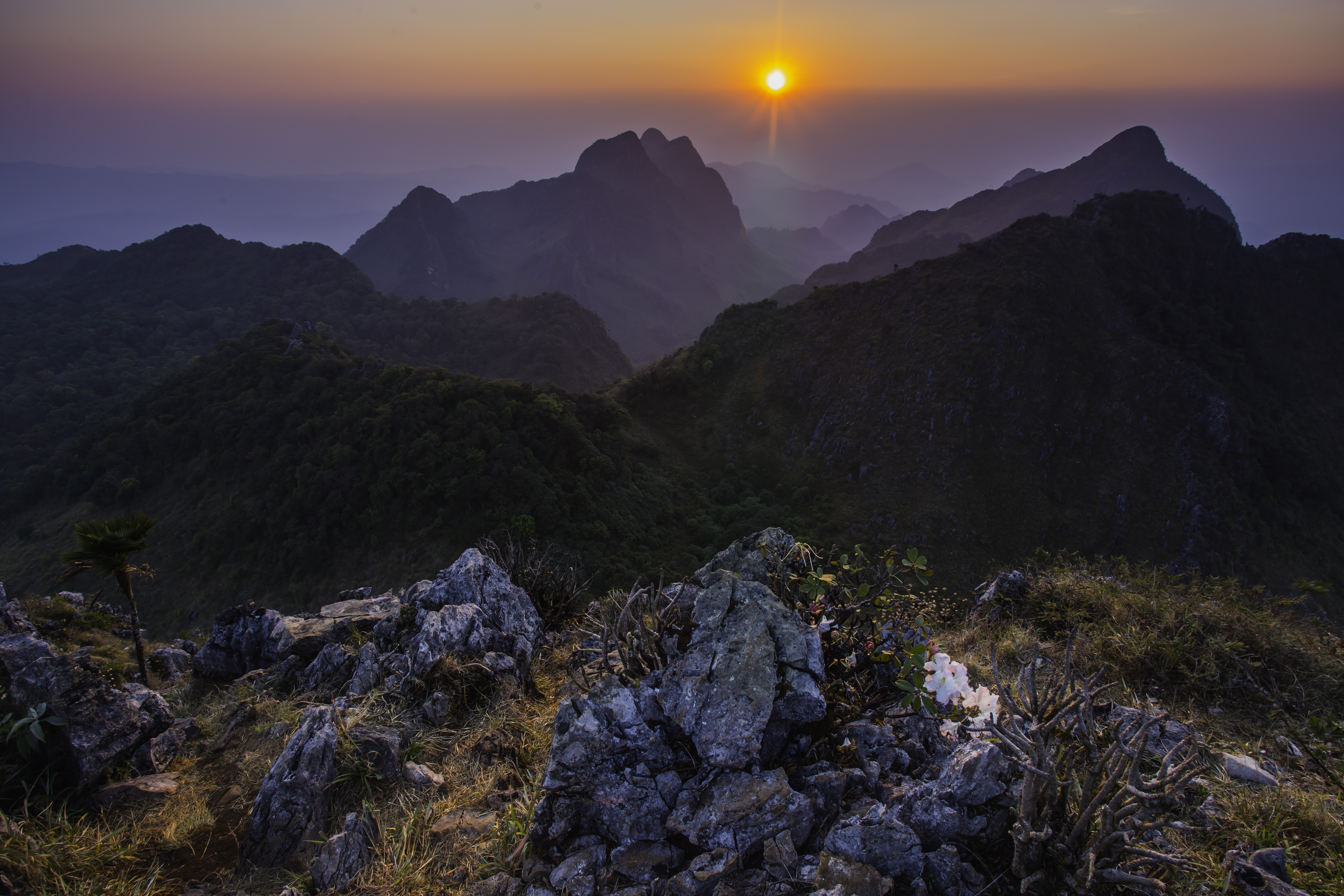
Pha Daeng National Park in Chiang Dao District

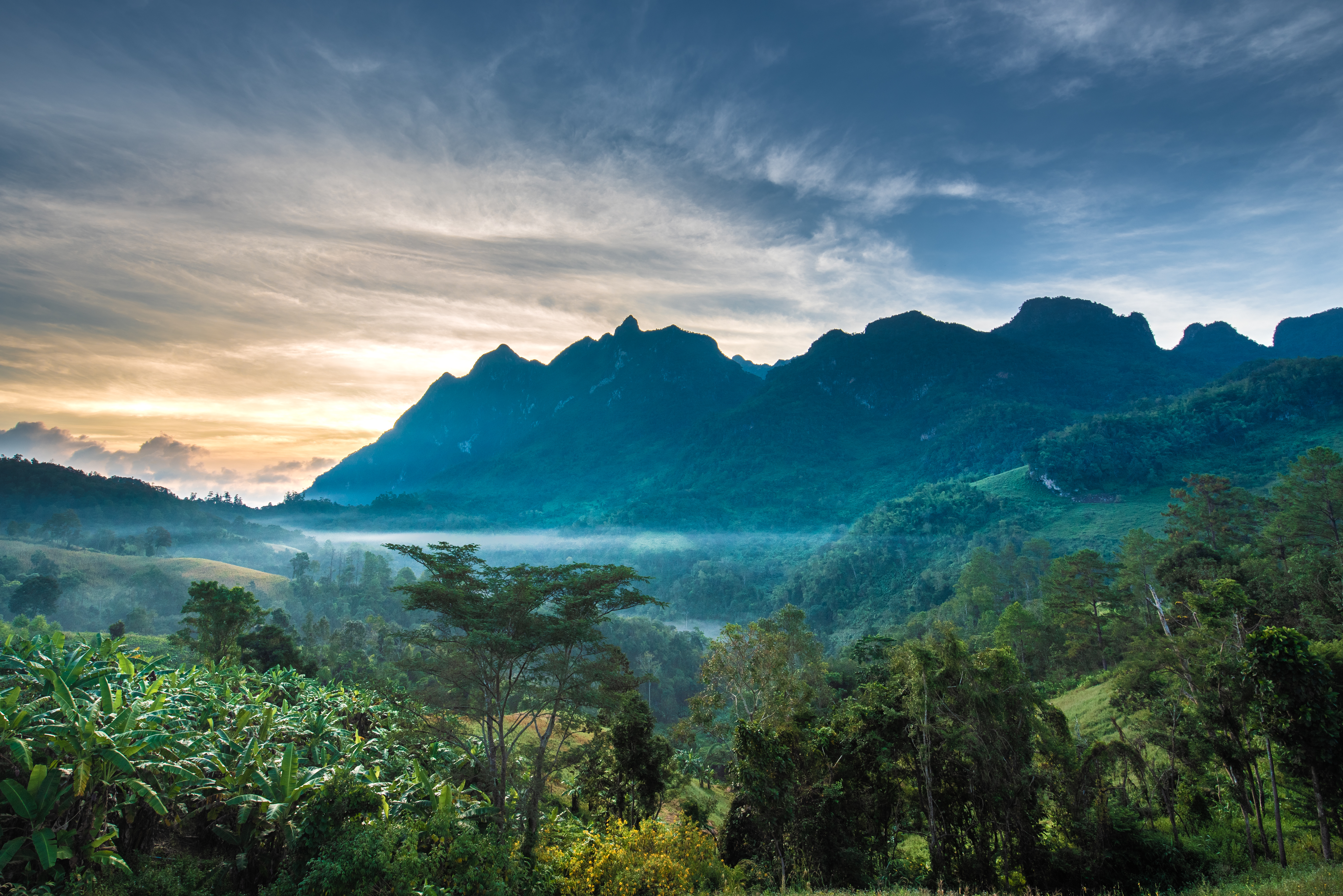
The mountains of Chiang Dao Wildlife Sanctuary in Chiang Dao District

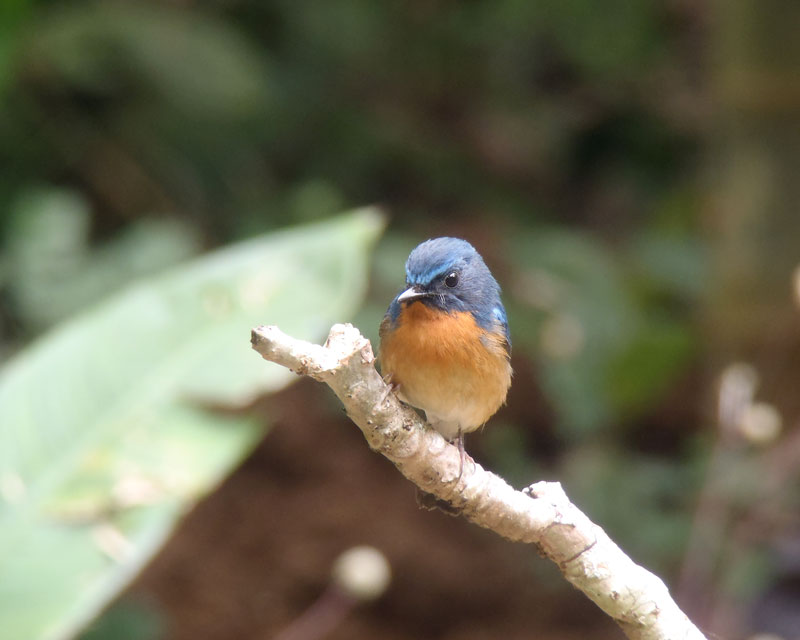
A photo of a hill blue flycatcher in the Chiang Dao Wildlife Sanctuary

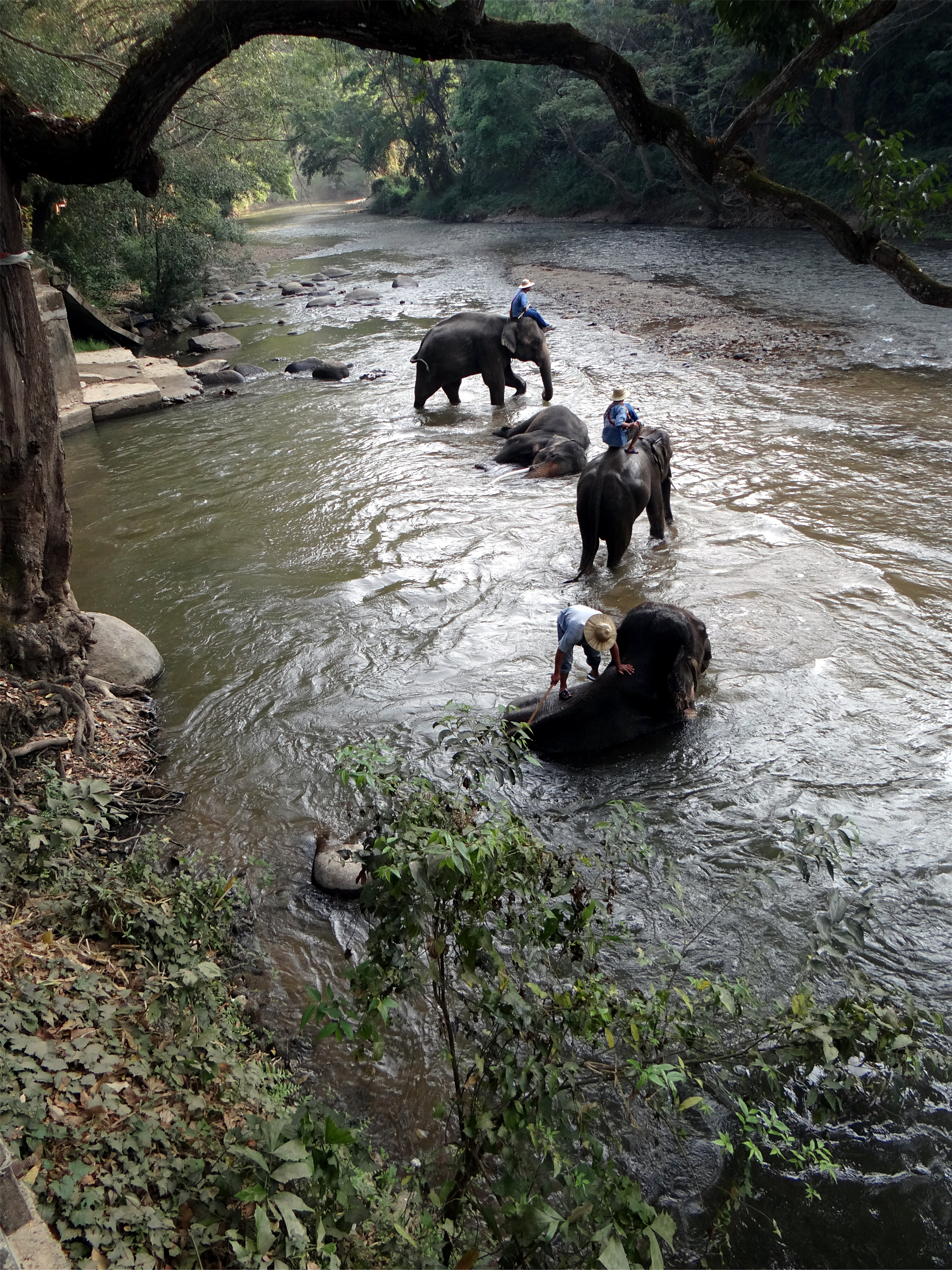
Bathing elephants in the Taeng River

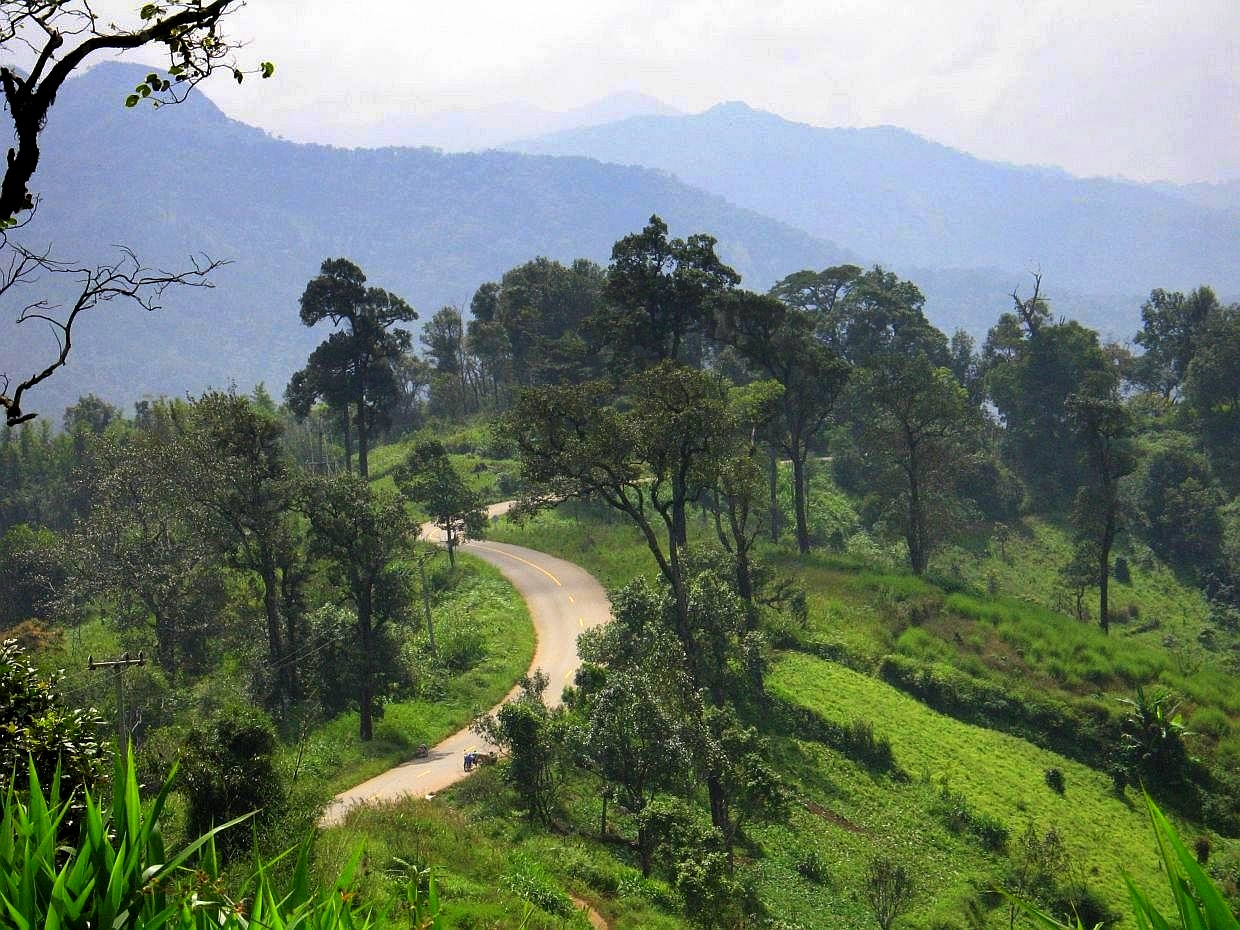
Mae Thun Noi, Omkoi

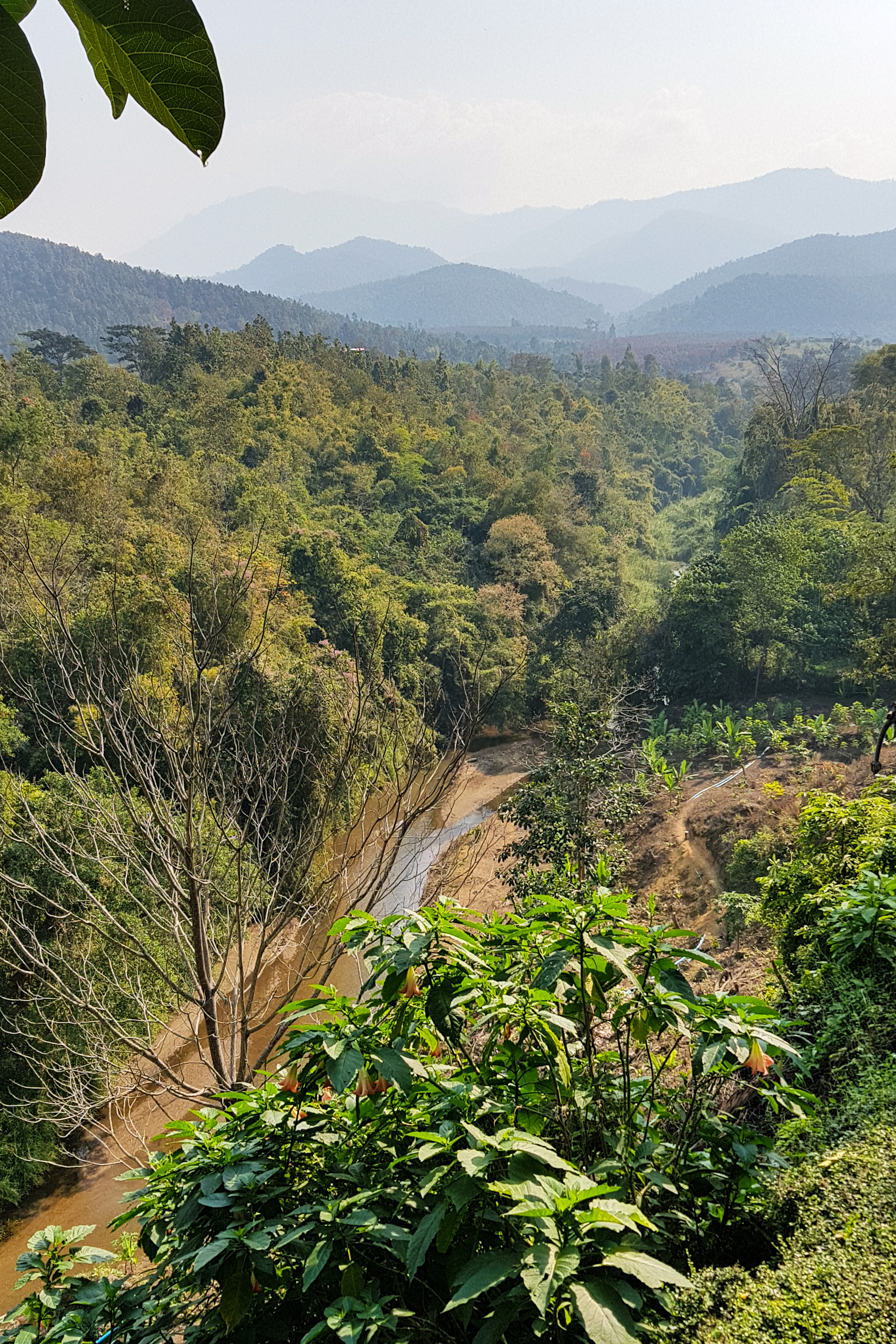
The Fang River, part of the Mekong watershed, in Chai Prakan District

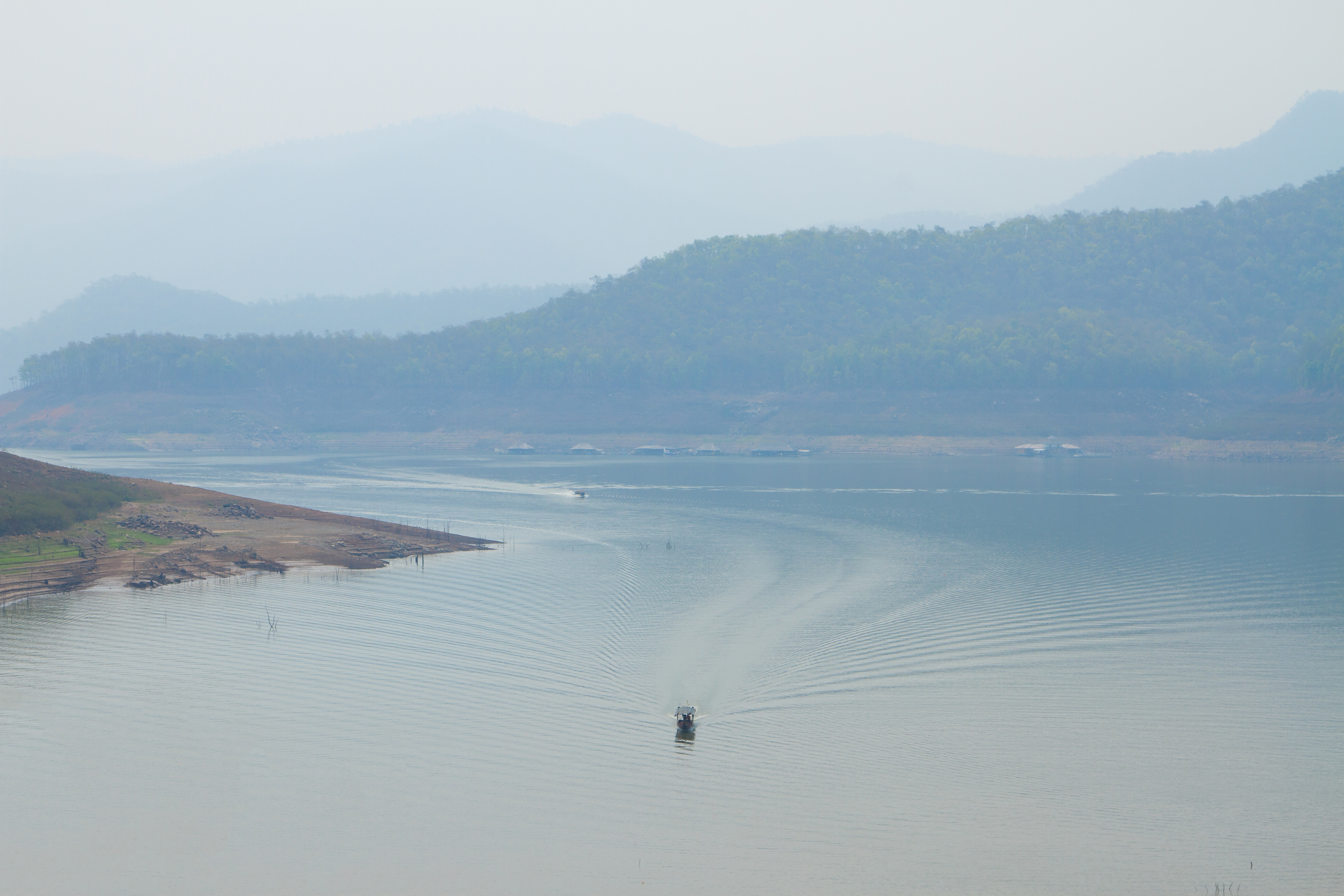
The lake of Mae Ngat Somboon Chon Dam, Si Lanna National Park

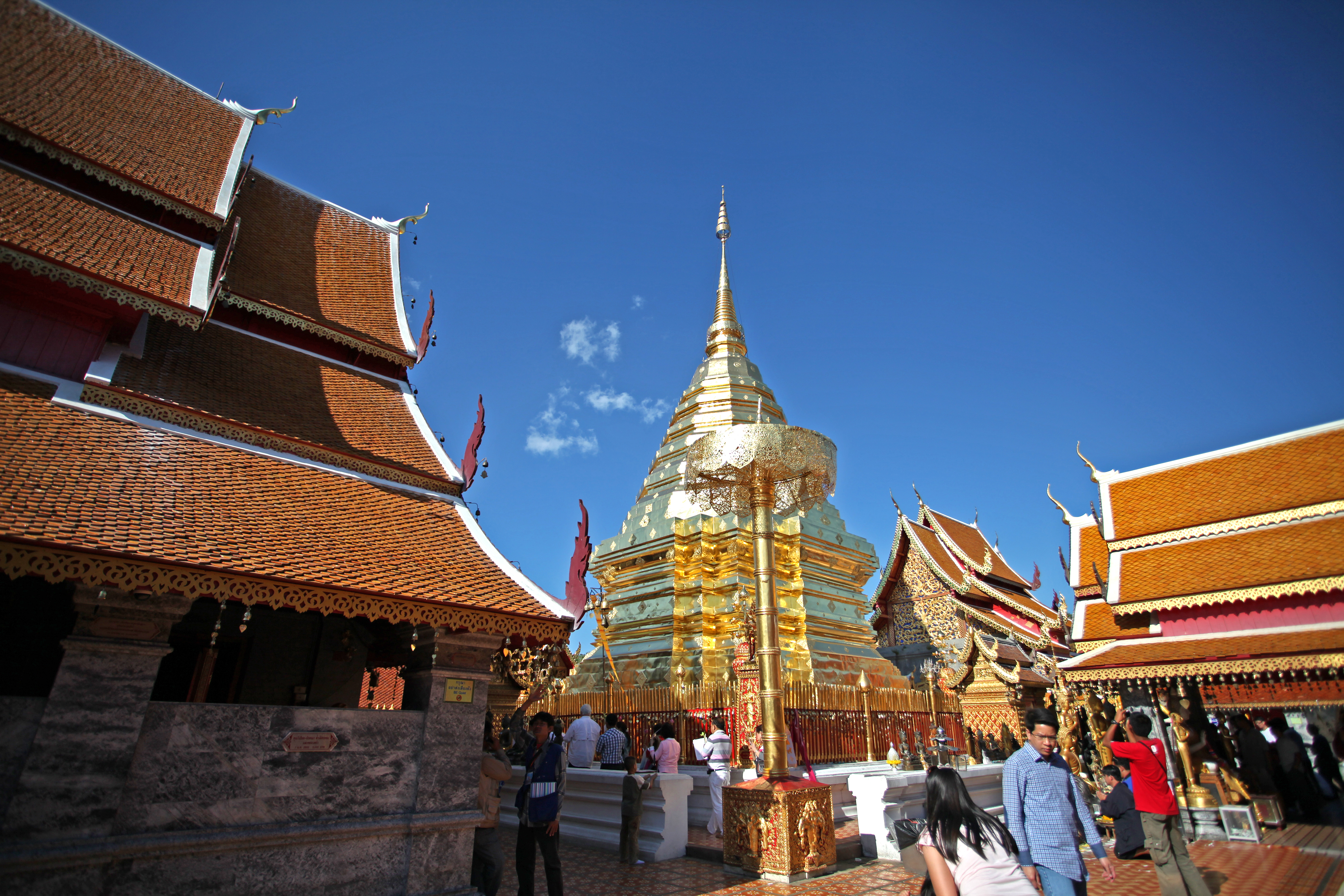
Wat Phra That Doi Suthep

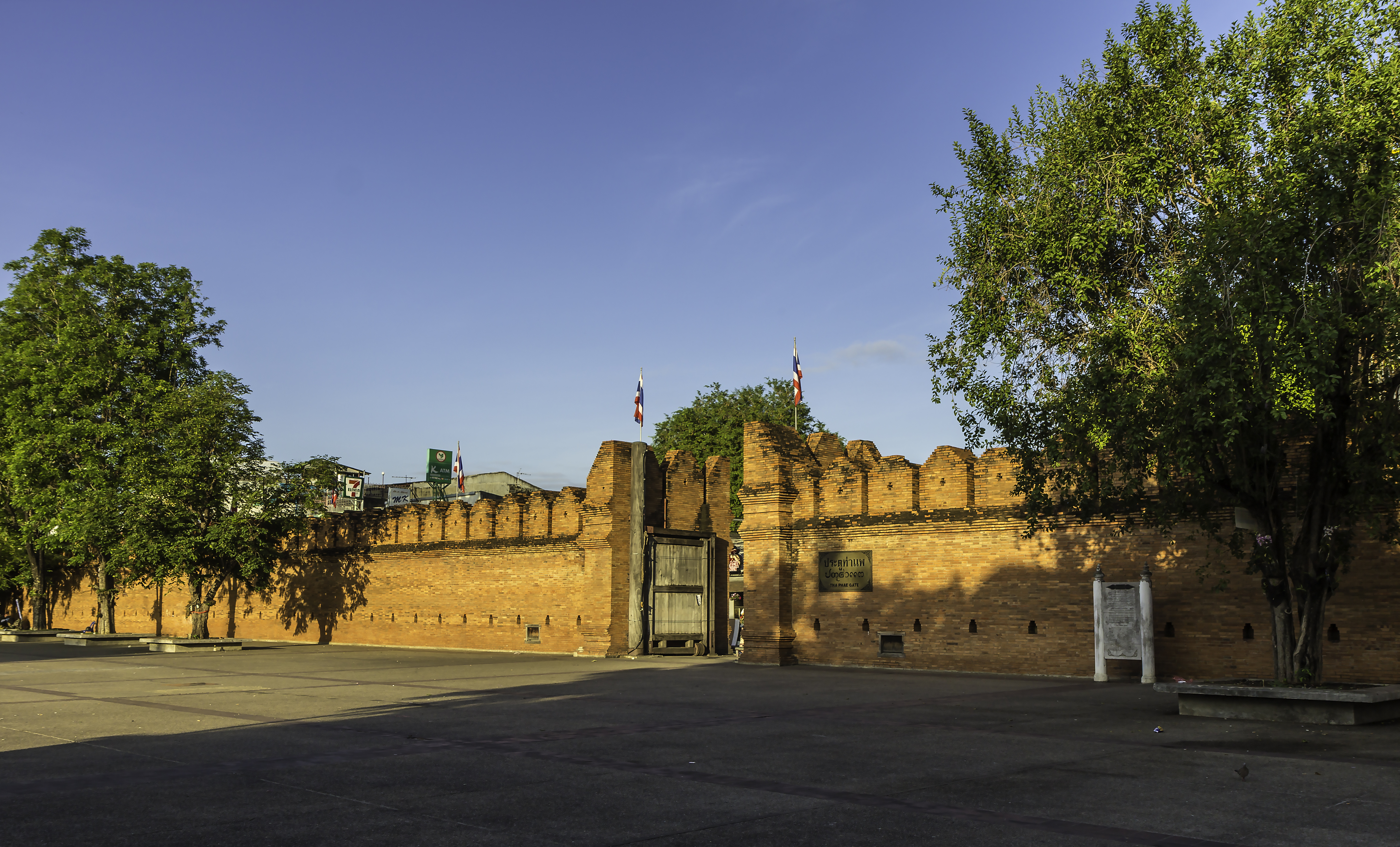
East gate (Tha Phae Gate) of the city wall

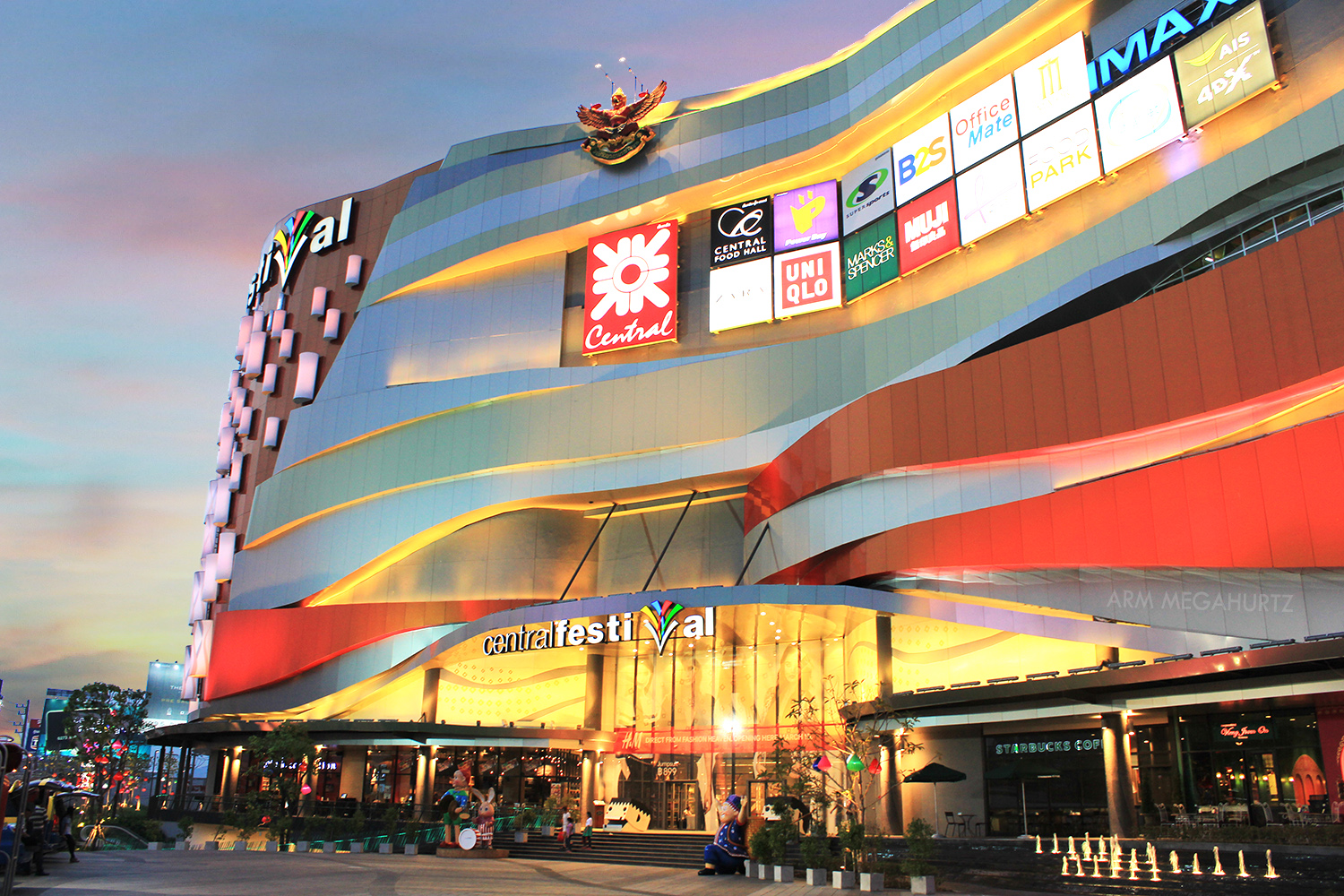
Shopping Mall in Chiang Mai

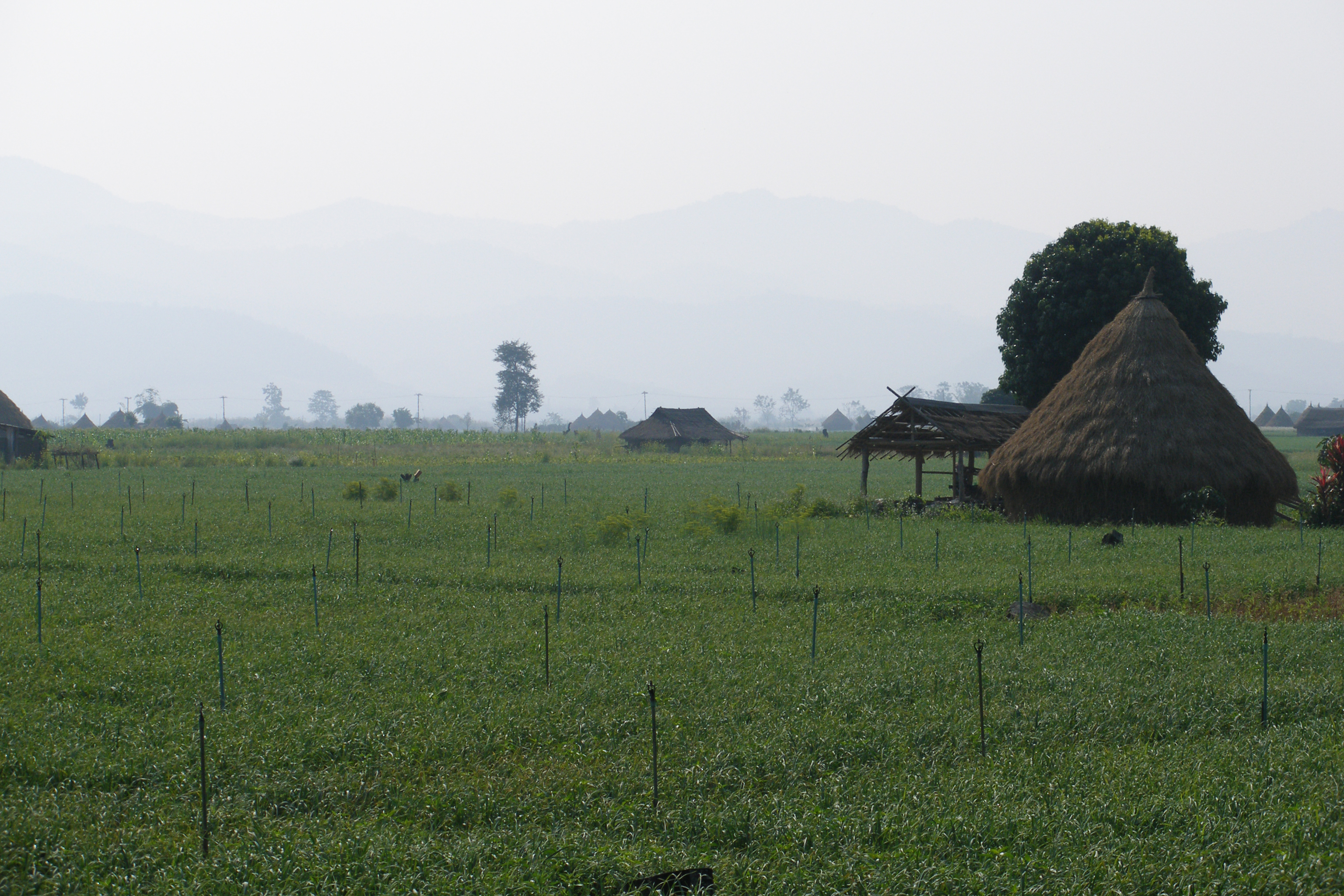
Thaton countryside

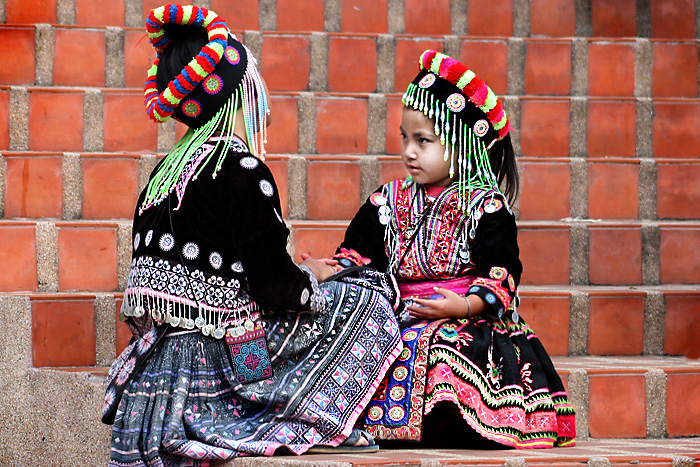
Hmong girls

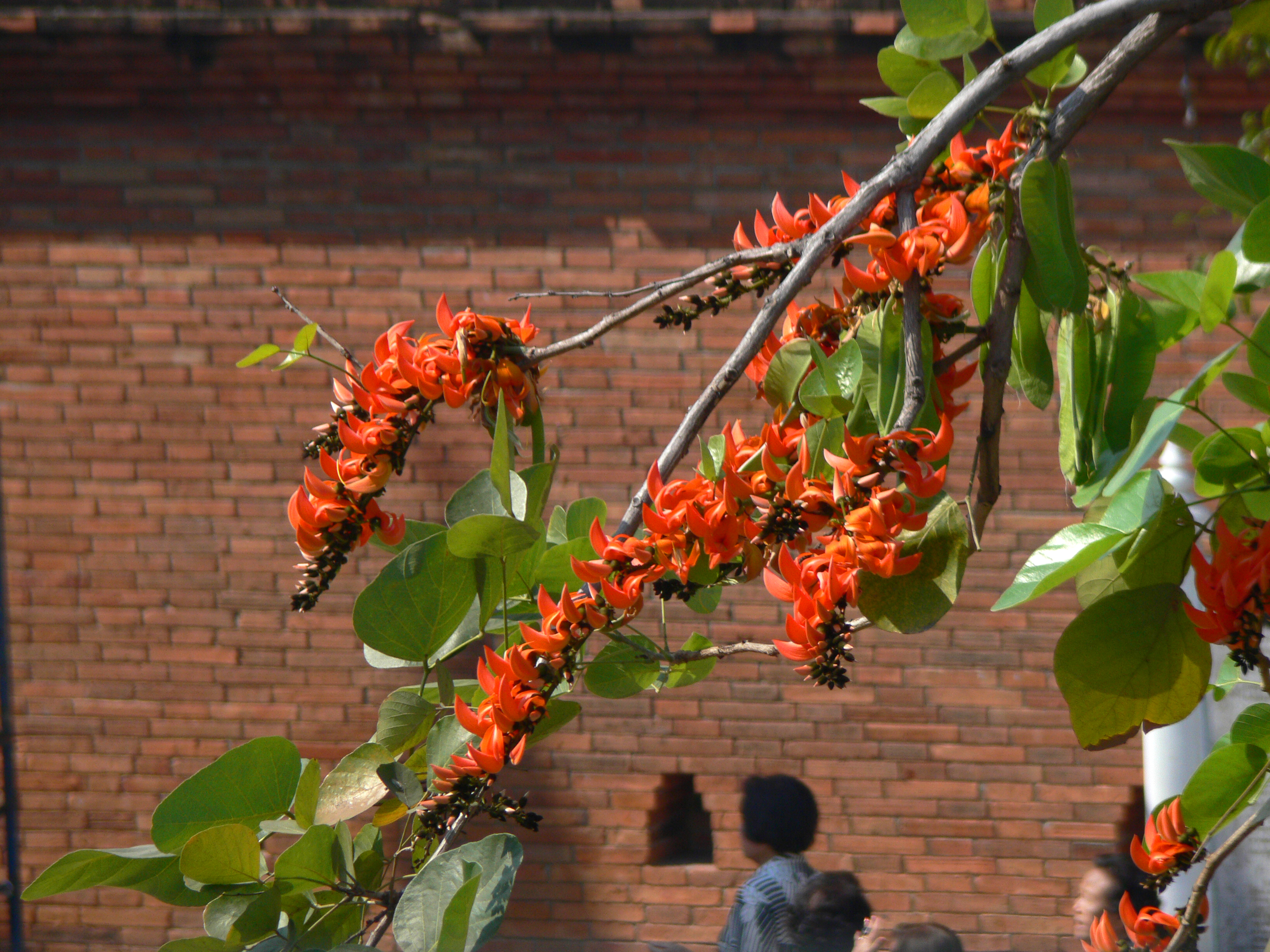
The "flame of the forest"
