= Hang Dong Canyon =

Tourist attraction in Chiang Mai, Thailand

Coordinates: 18.696751°N 98.893133°E

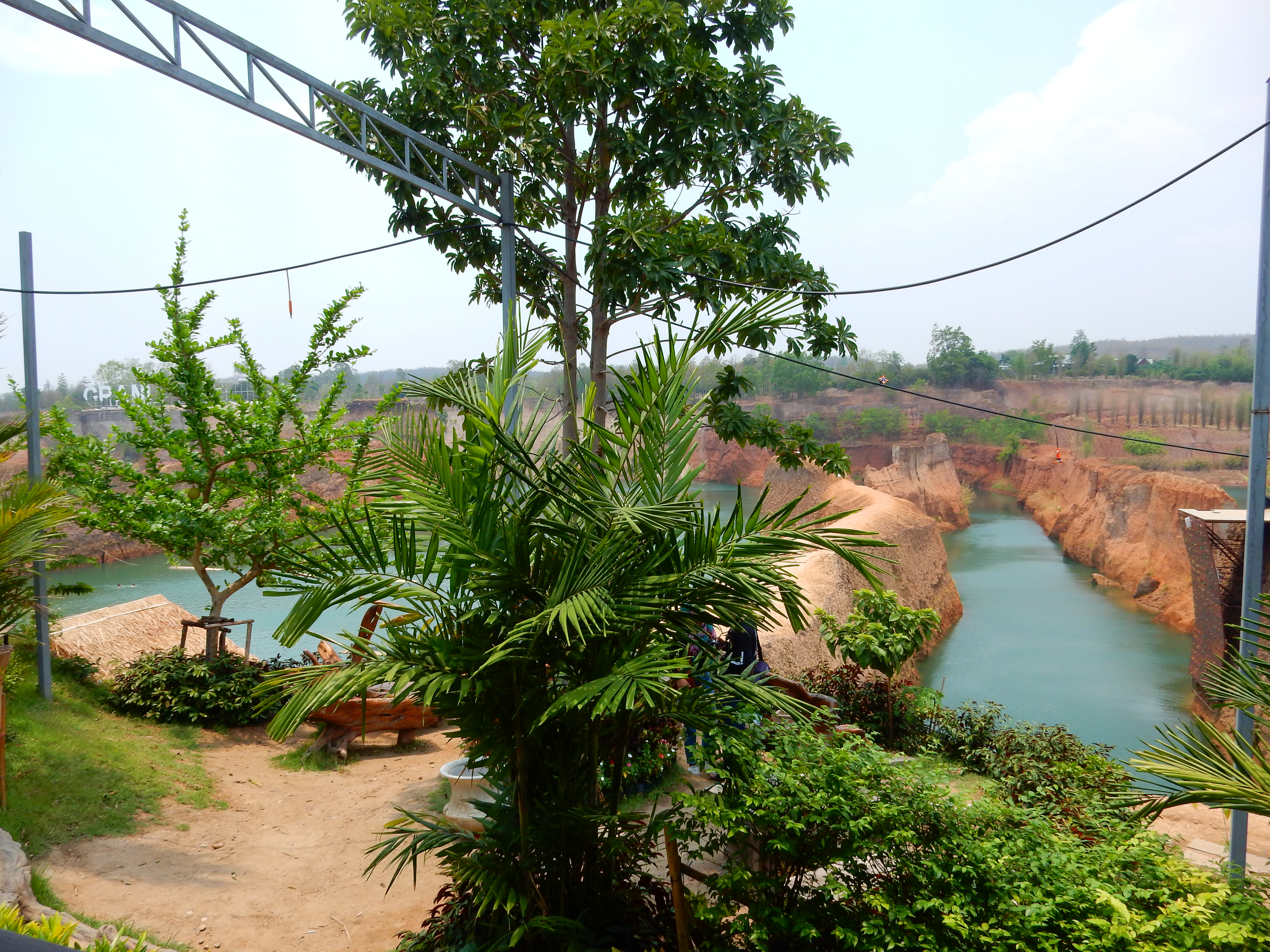

Hang Dong Canyon, (Thai: หางดงแคนยอน) also known as Chiang Mai Grand Canyon, is located in Soi Ban Rai 3 Mu 1, Nam Phrae, Hang Dong District, Chiang Mai Province, in the northern part of Thailand. Hang Dong Canyon is considered a tourist attraction in Chiang Mai. The canyon is about 48,000 square meters (520,000 sq ft).

== History ==
Hang Dong Canyon used to be an abandoned field and was accidentally created by Mr. Chatkarin Trakulinsan, the land owner. Between 2004-2005, Trakulinsan sold soil and created a 50-meter (160 ft) deep hole, around 48,000 square meters (520,000 sq ft); this hole eventually turned into a canyon. 10 years later, the hole was filled with water becoming a gigantic pond surrounded by the canyon.

== Climate ==
Climate data for Hang Dong Canyon
Month	Jan	Feb	Mar	Apr	May	Jun	Jul	Aug	Sep	Oct	Nov	Dec	Year
Mean daily maximum °F	86	90	95	97	93	90	90	88	88	88	86	82	89
Mean daily minimum °F	57	59	64	72	73	75	75	72	72	72	66	59	68
Average precipitation inches	0.3	0.2	0.5	2.0	6.2	5.2	6.3	9.3	9.0	4.8	2.1	0.8	46.7
Mean daily maximum °C	30	32	35	36	34	32	32	31	31	31	30	28	32
Mean daily minimum °C	14	15	18	22	23	24	24	22	22	22	19	15	20
Average precipitation mm	7	5	13	50	158	132	161	236	228	122	53	20	1,185
Source: Check Chiang Mai's 7 day forecast at TMD.go.th

Hang Dong Canyon has a tropical wet and dry climate year-round. The temperature at night is lower than in the day. There are three season in Thailand:

- A hot season (Feb to Jun)
- A wet season (Jun to Oct)
- A cool season (Oct to Jan)
