= Nirat Pongsitthaworn =

Thai civil servant

Nirat Phongsittithaworn
- นิรัตน์ พงษ์สิทธิถาวร (Thai)

Governor of Phuket Province
- Incumbent
- Assumed office 12 November 2025

Nirat Phongsittithaworn (Thai: นิรัตน์ พงษ์สิทธิถาวร, RTGS: Nirat Phongsittithaworn) is a Thai civil servant, serving as Governor of Chiang Mai Province since 2022.. On 29 of July 2025, he assumed the position of Director General at the Department of Provincial Administration, Ministry of Interior. After a few months of his tenure, he was appointed as the Governor of Phuket Province on November 12, 2025.

== Career ==
Nirat previously served as deputy permanent secretary for the Ministry of Interior, leading Road Safety Thailand.

Nirat led the response to the 2024 Chiang Mai Floods.

He hosted Prime Minister Paetongtarn Shinawatra and her father, former Prime Minister Thaksin Shinawatra, for Songkran in 2025.
