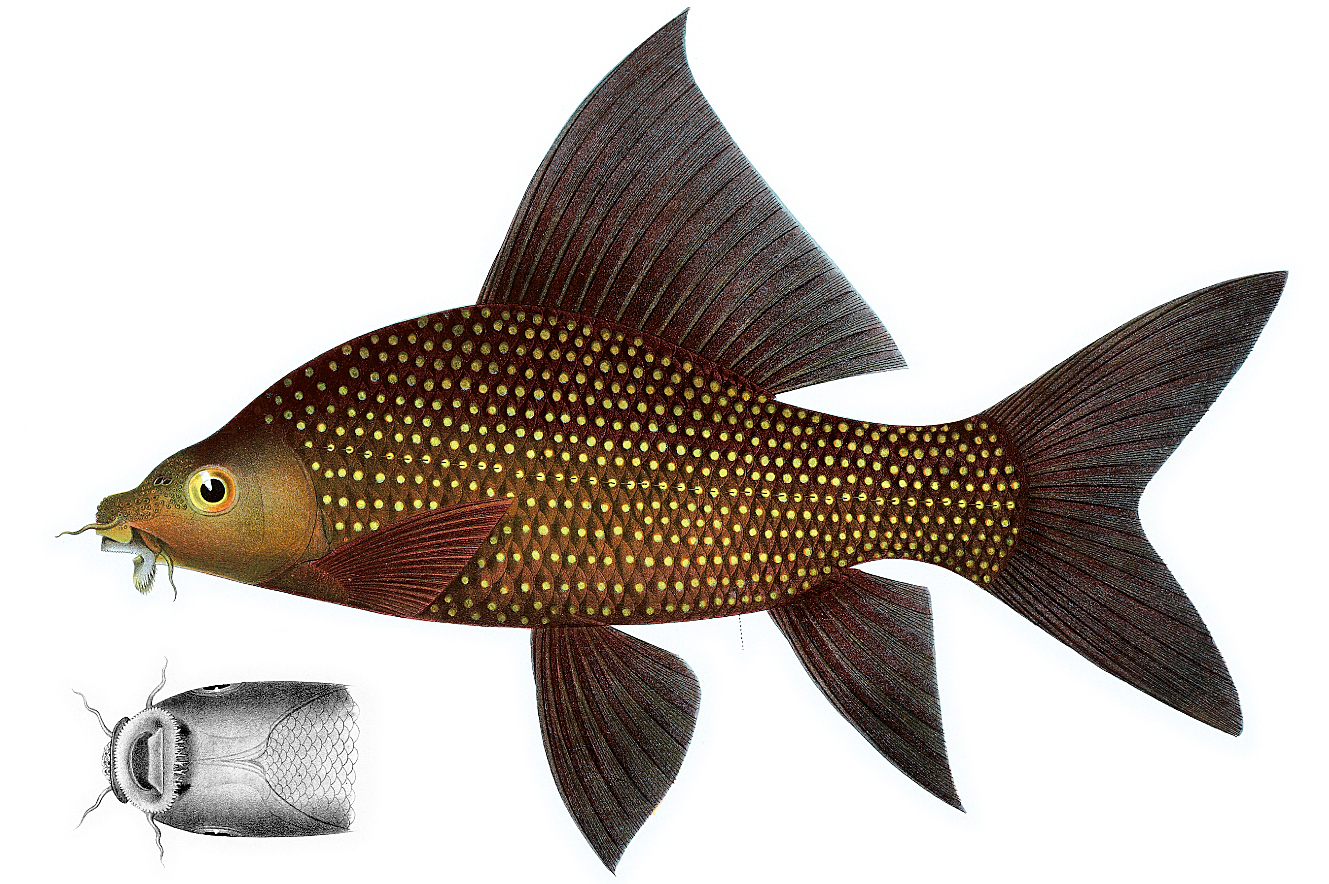

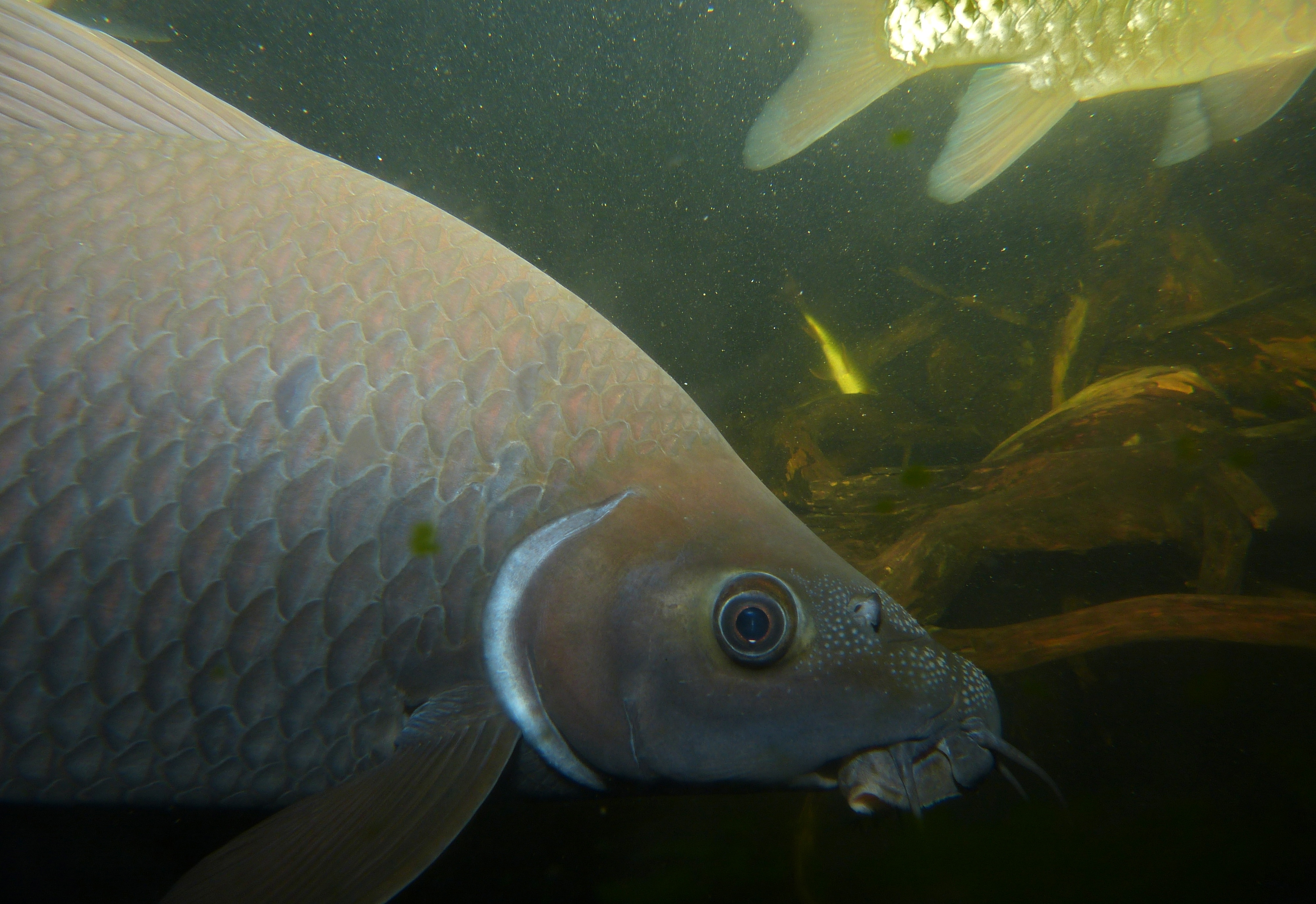

Conservation status
- Least Concern (IUCN 3.1)

Scientific classification
- Kingdom: Animalia
- Phylum: Chordata
- Class: Actinopterygii
- Order: Cypriniformes
- Family: Cyprinidae
- Subfamily: Labeoninae
- Genus: Labeo
- Species: L. chrysophekadion

Binomial name
- Labeo chrysophekadion (Bleeker, 1850)

Synonyms
- Rohita chrysophekadion Bleeker, 1850; Morulius chrysophekadion (Bleeker, 1850); Rohita cyanomelas Bleeker, 1852; Rohita polyporos Bleeker, 1853; Chrysophekadion polyporos (Bleeker, 1853); Rohita koilogeneion Bleeker, 1857; Rohita pectoralis Sauvage, 1878; Morulius pectoralis (Sauvage, 1878); Rohita barbatula Sauvage, 1878; Labeo barbatula (Sauvage, 1878); Rohita sima Sauvage, 1878

= Black sharkminnow =

Species of fish

The black sharkminnow (Labeo chrysophekadion), also known as the black shark or black labeo, is a species of freshwater fish in the carp family. It is found in the Mekong and Chao Phraya river basins, Malay Peninsula, Sumatra, Java and Borneo. It can reach a length of 90 cm (3 ft) and a weight of 7 kg (15 lb). It is sometimes seen in the aquarium trade, but is generally unsuitable for home aquaria due to its large adult size and territorial, aggressive behavior.

== Range in Thailand ==
Chao Phraya River, Mekong River, Mae Klong River, Salween River, Thai Peninsular and the south east.

== As food ==
In Thai cuisine, this type of fish is commonly used to make larb and very spicy and delicious sauce of Khanom chin, a Thai vermicelli dish.
