= Nam phrik ong =

Dish in Northern Thai cuisine

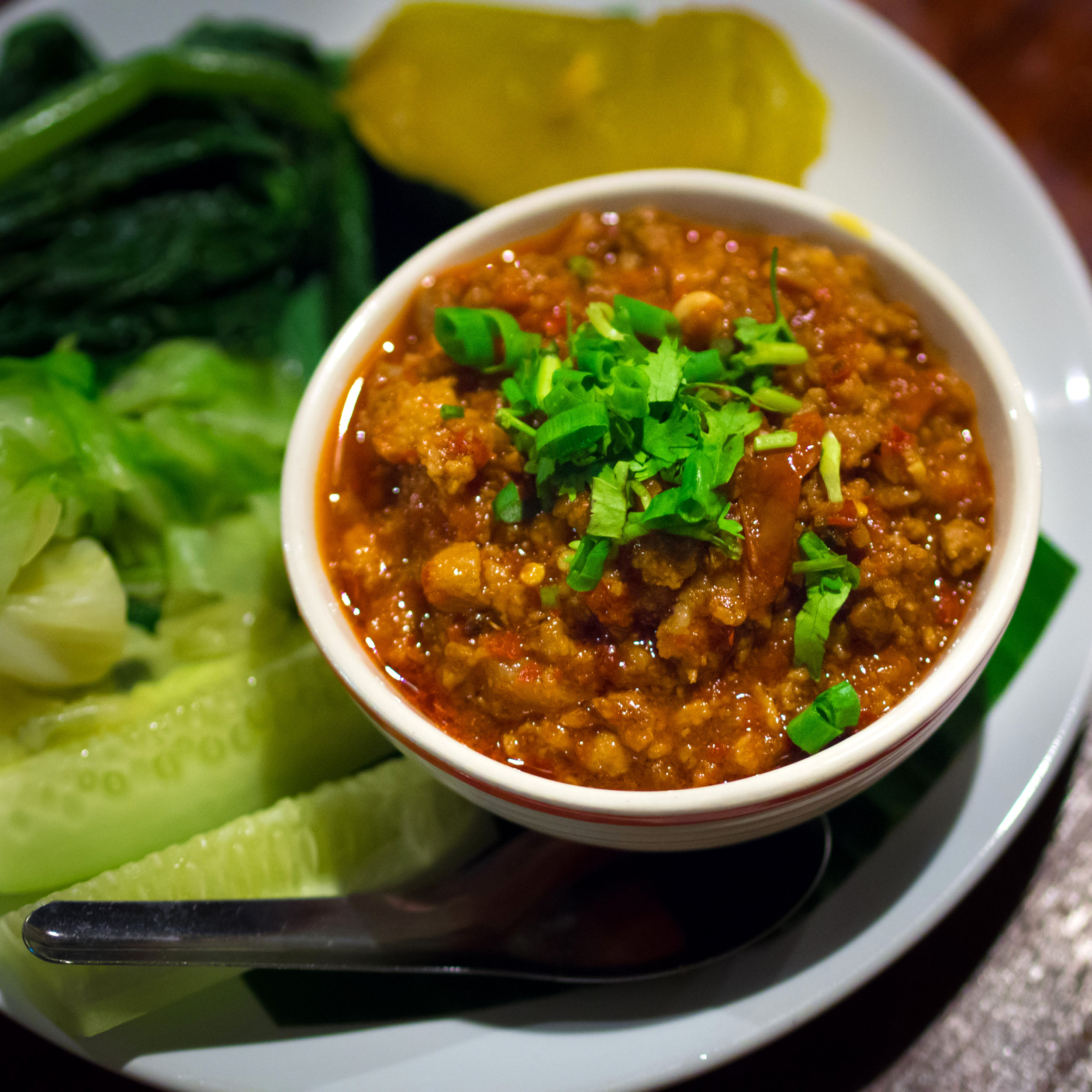
- Nam phrik ong (foreground)
- Place of origin: Thailand
- Region or state: Southeast Asia
- Created by: Northern Thai people
- Main ingredients: Ground pork, tomato, chili paste, fresh vegetable

Nam phrik ong (Thai: น้ำพริกอ่อง, pronounced [nám pʰrík ʔɔ̀ŋ]) is a popular Thai food in Northern Thailand. It is often paired with sticky rice, pork and fresh vegetables such as cucumber, lentils, Chinese cabbage etc.

== Ingredients and preparation ==
Nam phrik ong is made from ground pork, and may contain sugar, tomato, and shrimp paste. The chili paste typically includes dried chili, salt, garlic, lemongrass, water and shrimp paste, all of which is pounded in a mortar. The cooked ground pork is mixed with the chili paste in the mortar, with some water added if too dry, and it is typically served with an assortment of fresh seasonal vegetables.

== See also ==
- List of pork dishes
