= Mueang Khong =

Coordinates: 19°23′N 98°43′E

Mueang Khong เมืองคอง
- Tambon
- Interactive map of Mueang Khong
- Country: Thailand
- Province: Chiang Mai
- District: Chiang Dao

Area
  - Total: 270 km^{2} (100 sq mi)

Population (2005)
  - Total: 4,244
- Time zone: UTC+7 (ICT)

Mueang Khong or Ban Mueang Khong (Thai: เมืองคอง, pronounced [mɯːaŋ kʰɔːŋ], บ้านเมืองคอง, pronounced [baːn mɯːaŋ kʰɔːŋ]) is a tambon (sub-district) of Chiang Dao district, in Chiang Mai province, northern Thailand. In 2005 it had a population of 4,244 people.

== History & presently ==
Mueang Khong is a tiny community in the surrounding of the Chiang Dao range. Its name meaning "city or town of Khong", since it has the Khong and Mae Taeng rivers flowing through the area. For Khong is a river that originated from neighbouring Wiang Haeng district, and flows confluence the Mae Taeng river at the end of the sub-district.

In the past, it was only a pass or overnight spot for people who traveled from somewhere else.

Nowadays, this community is well-known as another tourist attraction in the district. There are homestays, coffee shops, and paddy fields that are check-in and good photography spots for visitors. It has adapted itself for tourism.

== Geography ==
Mueang Khong is 30 km (18 mi) from downtown Chiang Dao. It can be accessible via a steep hilly route as well as off-road route connecting to Huai Nam Dang, Wiang Kaen, and Mae Taeng districts.

The terrain is a plain that is surrounded by Chiang Dao range, with a total area of 270 km^{2} (100 sq mi), mostly paddy fields.

Neighbouring districts are (from north clockwise): Wiang Haeng of Chiang Mai, Mueang Ngai in its district, Mae Taeng of Chiang Mai, and Pai of Mae Hong Son.

== Demography ==
Ethnic groups consist of Lanna people, Tai Yai, Lisu, Lahu, and Paganyaw Christian.

== Economy ==
Mueang Khong has grown its own rice, which is why there are extensive paddy field visible during both the cropping and harvesting seasons.

Weaving baskets (Kuai in dialect) is an additional occupation of the locals when they are free from cultivation.

== Administration ==
The tambon is divided into six administrative mubans (villages)

| No. | Name | Thai |
|---|---|---|
| 1. | Ban Mai | บ้านใหม่ |
| 2. | Ban Wang Mario | บ้านวังมะริว |
| 3. | Ban Nong Bua | บ้านหนองบัว |
| 4. | Ban Luang | บ้านหลวง |
| 5. | Ban Nam Ru | บ้านน้ำรู |
| 6. | Ban Mae Plaem | บ้านแม่แพลม |

== Local food ==
Pla Klom Mon or just called Pla Mon (Scaphiodonichthys acanthopterus) are small freshwater fish in cyprinid family that are plentiful in the Khong river. This species of fish is deep fried with garlic, and it will so crispy that can eat all of it, considered as a local food that is unique to this community.
