= Chiang Dao =

Chiang Dao may refer to:

- Chiang Dao District
- Chiang Dao Subdistrict
- Doi Chiang Dao, a mountain in Northern Thailand
- Chiang Dao National Park
- Chiang Dao Wildlife Sanctuary
