= Saen Hai =

Coordinates: 19.6267°N 98.6296°E

Saen Hai แสนไห
- Tambon
- Interactive map of Saen Hai
- Country: Thailand
- Province: Chiang Mai
- District: Wiang Haeng

Population (2005)
  - Total: 3,488
- Time zone: UTC+7 (ICT)

Saen Hai (Thai: แสนไห, pronounced [sɛ̌ːn hǎj]) is a tambon (subdistrict) of Wiang Haeng District, in Chiang Mai Province, Thailand. In 2005 it had a population of 3,488 people. The tambon contains five villages.

== Toponymy ==
The word "Saen Hai" literally means "hundred thousand cries" — or alternatively, "hundred thousand jars." The name derives from Phra Borom That Saen Hai, an ancient local cetiya (Buddhist reliquary), located in the adjoining area of Mueang Haeng.

According to local legend, King Naresuan once rested his armies here and ordered a pool built at the foot of the hill for himself and his war elephants. It is said that he died at this site at the age of 50. When the public learned of his death, hundreds of thousands of people wept — hence the name.

However, this story has not been officially recognized by mainstream historians.

== Geography ==
Saen Hai can be considered as a west part of the district. The terrain is shaped like a plow along the length of north to south, with a total area of approximately 22 km^{2} (13,750 rai).

Adjoining areas are (from the northeast clockwise): Myanmar, Piang Luang in its district, Mueang Haeng and Ban Na Mon of Mueang Haeng in its district.

== Administration ==
The whole area of the tambon is covered by the subdistrict municipality (Thesaban Tambon) Saen Hai (เทศบาลตำบลแสนไห).

The tambon also consists of five administrative mubans (village).

No.	Name	Thai
1.	Ban San Duangdi	บ้านสันดวงดี
2.	Ban Sam Pu	บ้านสามปู
3.	Ban Muang Pok	บ้านม่วงป๊อก
4.	Ban Maha That	บ้านมหาธาตุ
5.	Ban Pang Po	บ้านปางป๋อ

== Transportation ==
Saen Hai is about 5 km (3 mi) from Wiang Haeng District Office via Mae Cha–Piang Luang Road.

== Local product ==
- Brown rice
