= Schistura maejotigrina =

Scientific classification
- Domain: Eukaryota
- Kingdom: Animalia
- Phylum: Chordata
- Class: Actinopterygii
- Order: Cypriniformes
- Family: Nemacheilidae
- Genus: Schistura
- Species: S. maejotigrina

Binomial name
- Schistura maejotigrina Suvarnaraksha, 2012

Species of fish

Schistura maejotigrina is a species of stone loach, a freshwater fish, from northern Thailand.

The species was first described in 2012. From the Ping River drainage in the northern Chao Phraya River basin, fish of about 5 cm length were found in a stream near a waterfall and terraced rice fields. The specimens were collected in fast flowing, clear water over a substrate of sand and gravel.
