= Wat Tham Chiang Dao =

Buddhist cave temple in Chiang Mai province, Thailand

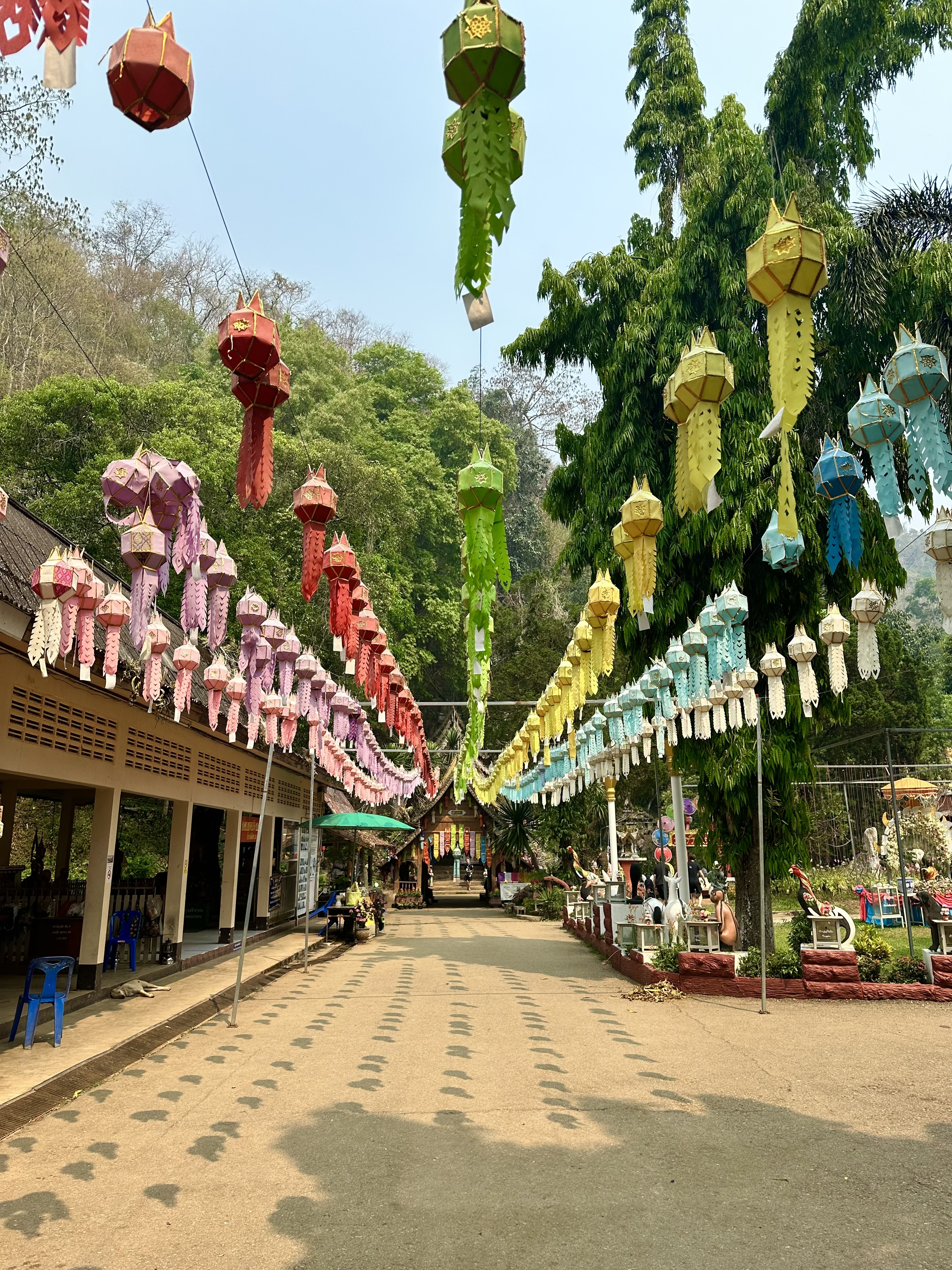
Entrance of Wat Tham Chiang Dao

Wat Tham Chiang Dao (Thai: วัดถ้ำเชียงดาว), also known as Wat Tham Luang Chiang Dao (วัดถ้ำหลวงเชียงดาว), is a Buddhist temple at the foot of Doi Luang Chiang Dao in Chiang Dao district, Chiang Mai province, Thailand. The temple is located at the entrance to Chiang Dao Cave, a limestone cave containing Buddha images and shrines. It is visited by Buddhist worshippers and tourists.

== Cave information ==
Chiang Dao Cave is formed in limestone dating from approximately 250 to 300 million years ago. The cave contains stalactites and stalagmites formed by water passing through the limestone.

The cave has five main chambers: the Reclining Buddha Chamber (351.46 metres), the Water Chamber (298.34 metres), the Horse Chamber (86.25 metres), the Hidden Chamber (273.19 metres), and the Crystal Chamber (100.46 metres). The Reclining Buddha Chamber connects to the Water Chamber, while the Horse Chamber connects to the Hidden Chamber. There are also smaller chambers, including the Skylight, Divine Assembly Hall and Stone Rice Field.

Some parts of the cave have electric lighting and can be visited without a guide. Other chambers, including the Horse Chamber and Crystal Chamber, require a local guide carrying a lantern.

== History ==
Wat Tham Chiang Dao was established in 1767 (BE 2310) by Phra Khruba Pratham Panya and Pho Saen Pi. In 1887, Phraya Inthaphiban built a staircase leading to the cave entrance, along with other structures and religious objects.

In 1913, a hermit named Kantha built Buddha images at the temple. A chedi with 25 spires was also built in the same year. The chedi was later restored by the Fine Arts Department.

In 1934, Khruba Siwichai carried out construction and restoration work at the temple. Additional buildings and religious structures were added in later years.

The temple received a royal grant of Wisungam Sima on 23 June 1971 (BE 2514).

== Legend ==
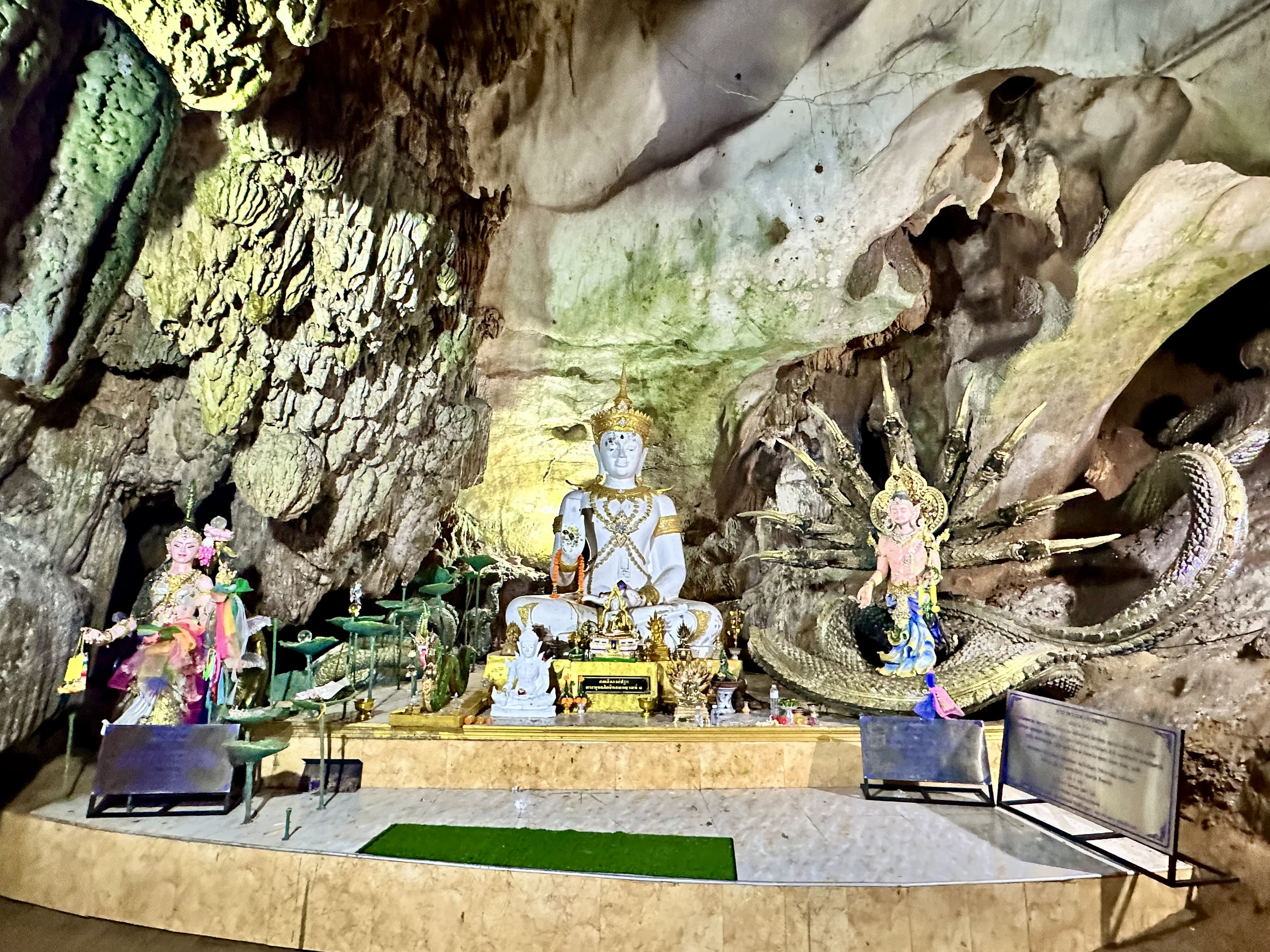
Inside Wat Tham Chiang Dao

According to a local legend, Chao Luang Kham Daeng, a prince from Phayao, followed a golden deer into Chiang Dao Cave. The deer was a young woman who had changed into the form of an animal. Kham Daeng entered the cave while following her and never returned. Local people believe that he became a guardian spirit of the cave. A shrine was later built for him.

Another legend tells of a hermit named Phrom Ruesi (พรหมฤๅษี), who had gained supernatural powers through meditation. He called upon divine beings, including Indra, Brahma, yakshas and nagas, to create sacred objects. These included golden Buddha images, a golden Bodhi tree, a white elephant, a magical sword and other treasures. The objects were hidden deep inside Chiang Dao Cave and guarded by Chao Luang Kham Daeng.

The legend also tells of two villagers who entered the cave to search for the treasures. They became lost and could not find their way out. Other villagers later found them. One had died, while the other was taken home but died less than a week later. Other people were also said to have died after entering the cave in search of the treasures. The story became part of local beliefs about the sacred nature of Chiang Dao Cave.
