= Thung Khao Phuang =

Thung Khao Phuang ทุ่งข้าวพวง
- Tambon
- Interactive map of Thung Khao Phuang
- Coordinates: 19°32′03″N 98°57′44″E
- Country: Thailand
- Province: Chiang Mai
- Amphoe: Chiang Dao

Population (2020)
  - Total: 10,842
- Time zone: UTC+7 (TST)
- Postal code: 50170
- TIS 1099: 500407

Thung Khao Phuang (Thai: ทุ่งข้าวพวง) is a tambon (subdistrict) of Chiang Dao District, in Chiang Mai Province, Thailand. In 2020 it had a total population of 10,842 people.

== History ==
The subdistrict was created effective June 1, 1983 by splitting off 5 administrative villages from Mueang Ngai.

== Administration ==
=== Central administration ===
The tambon is subdivided into 7 administrative villages (muban).

No.	Name	Thai
1.	Ban Huai Pao	บ้านห้วยเป้า
2.	Ban Mae Kon	บ้านแม่ก๋อน
3.	Ban Thung Khao Phuang	บ้านทุ่งข้าวพวง
4.	Ban Mae Cha	บ้านแม่จา
5.	Ban Huai Sai Khao	บ้านห้วยทรายขาว
6.	Ban Khun Khong	บ้านขุนคอง
7.	Ban Huai Tin Tang	บ้านห้วยตีนตั่ง

=== Local administration ===
The whole area of the subdistrict is covered by the subdistrict municipality (Thesaban Tambon) Thung Khao Phuang (เทศบาลตำบลทุ่งข้าวพวง).
