= Ping Khong =

Ping Khong ปิงโค้ง
- Tambon
- Interactive map of Ping Khong
- Coordinates: 19°25′46″N 98°58′44″E
- Country: Thailand
- Province: Chiang Mai
- Amphoe: Chiang Dao

Population (2020)
  - Total: 14,007
- Time zone: UTC+7 (TST)
- Postal code: 50170
- TIS 1099: 500406

Ping Khong (Thai: ปิงโค้ง) is a tambon (subdistrict) of Chiang Dao District, in Chiang Mai Province, Thailand. In 2020, it had a total population of 14,007 people.

== History ==
The subdistrict was created effective August 1, 1979 by splitting off 5 administrative villages from Mueang Ngai.

== Administration ==
=== Central administration ===
The tambon is subdivided into 16 administrative villages (muban).

No.	Name	Thai
1.	Ban On	บ้านออน
2.	Ban Pang Fueang	บ้านปางเฟือง
3.	Ban Mae Pam	บ้านแม่ป๋าม
4.	Ban Pang Mayao	บ้านปางมะเยา
5.	Ban Trai Sapha Wakham	บ้านไตรสภาวคาม
6.	Ban Hua Tho	บ้านหัวโท
7.	Ban Huai Luek	บ้านห้วยลึก
8.	Ban Pang Mo	บ้านปางโม่
9.	Ban Huai Chadan	บ้านห้วยจะค่าน
10.	Ban Mai Samakkhi	บ้านใหม่สามัคคี
11.	Ban Pang Makong	บ้านปางมะกง
12.	Ban Mae Maku	บ้านแม่มะกู้
13.	Ban Ping Khong	บ้านปิงโค้ง
14.	Ban Pa Tueng Ngam	บ้านป่าตึงงาม
15.	Ban Nong Tao	บ้านหนองเต่า
16.	Ban Huai Nam Rin	บ้านห้วยน้ำริน

=== Local administration ===
The whole area of the subdistrict is covered by the subdistrict municipality (Thesaban Tambon) Ping Khong (เทศบาลตำบลปิงโค้ง).
