= Mueang Na =

Mueang Na เมืองนะ
- Tambon
- Interactive map of Mueang Na
- Coordinates: 19°35′36″N 98°57′42″E
- Country: Thailand
- Province: Chiang Mai
- Amphoe: Chiang Dao

Population (2020)
  - Total: 37,348
- Time zone: UTC+7 (TST)
- Postal code: 50170
- TIS 1099: 500402

Mueang Na (Thai: เมืองนะ) is a tambon (subdistrict) of Chiang Dao District, in Chiang Mai Province, Thailand. In 2020 it had a total population of 37,348 people.

== Administration ==
=== Central administration ===
The tambon is subdivided into 14 administrative villages (muban).

No.	Name	Thai
1.	Ban Mueang Na	บ้านเมืองนะ
2.	Ban Kae Noi	บ้านแกน้อย
3.	Ban Na Wai	บ้านนาหวาย
4.	Ban Lo Pahan	บ้านโละป่าหาญ
5.	Ban Pong Ang	บ้านโป่งอาง
6.	Ban Nam Ru	บ้านน้ำรู
7.	Ban Huai Sai	บ้านห้วยไส้
8.	Ban Chong Kham	บ้านจองคำ
9.	Ban Chaiya	บ้านไชยา
10.	Ban Arunothai	บ้านอรุโณทัย
11.	Ban Nong Khaem	บ้านหนองแขม
12.	Ban Nong Khiao	บ้านหนองเขียว
13.	Ban Chia Chan	บ้านเจียจันทร์
14.	Ban Mai Samakkhi	บ้านใหม่สามัคคี

=== Local administration ===
The whole area of the subdistrict is covered by the subdistrict municipality (Thesaban Tambon) Mueang Na (เทศบาลตำบลเมืองนะ).
