= Mae Na =

Mae Na แม่นะ
- Tambon
- Interactive map of Mae Na
- Coordinates: 19°20′28″N 98°57′37″E
- Country: Thailand
- Province: Chiang Mai
- Amphoe: Chiang Dao

Population (2020)
  - Total: 9,882
- Time zone: UTC+7 (TST)
- Postal code: 50170
- TIS 1099: 500404

Mae Na (Thai: แม่นะ) is a tambon (subdistrict) of Chiang Dao District, in Chiang Mai Province, Thailand. In 2020 it had a total population of 9,882 people.

== Administration ==
=== Central administration ===
The tambon is subdivided into 13 administrative villages (muban).

No.	Name	Thai
1.	Ban Pa Bong	บ้านป่าบง
2.	Ban Mae Na	บ้านแม่นะ
3.	Ban Chom Khiri	บ้านจอมคีรี
4.	Ban Huai Cho	บ้านห้วยโจ้
5.	Ban Mae Ya	บ้านแม่ยะ
6.	Ban Sop Dap	บ้านสบคาบ
7.	Ban Sop O	บ้านสบอ้อ
8.	Ban Mae O Nai	บ้านแม่อ้อใน
9.	Ban Pang Ma-o	บ้านปางมะโอ
10.	Ban Kaeng Pun Tao	บ้านแก่งปันเต๊า
11.	Ban Mae Mae	บ้านแม่แมะ
12.	Ban San Pa Kia	บ้านสันป่าเกี๊ยะ
13.	Ban Mai Sai	บ้านแม่ซ้าย

=== Local administration ===
The whole area of the subdistrict is covered by the subdistrict municipality (Thesaban Tambon) Mae Na (เทศบาลตำบลแม่นะ).
