= Huai Nam Dang National Park =

National park in Thailand

- อุทยานแห่งชาติห้วยน้ำดัง
- IUCN category II (national park)
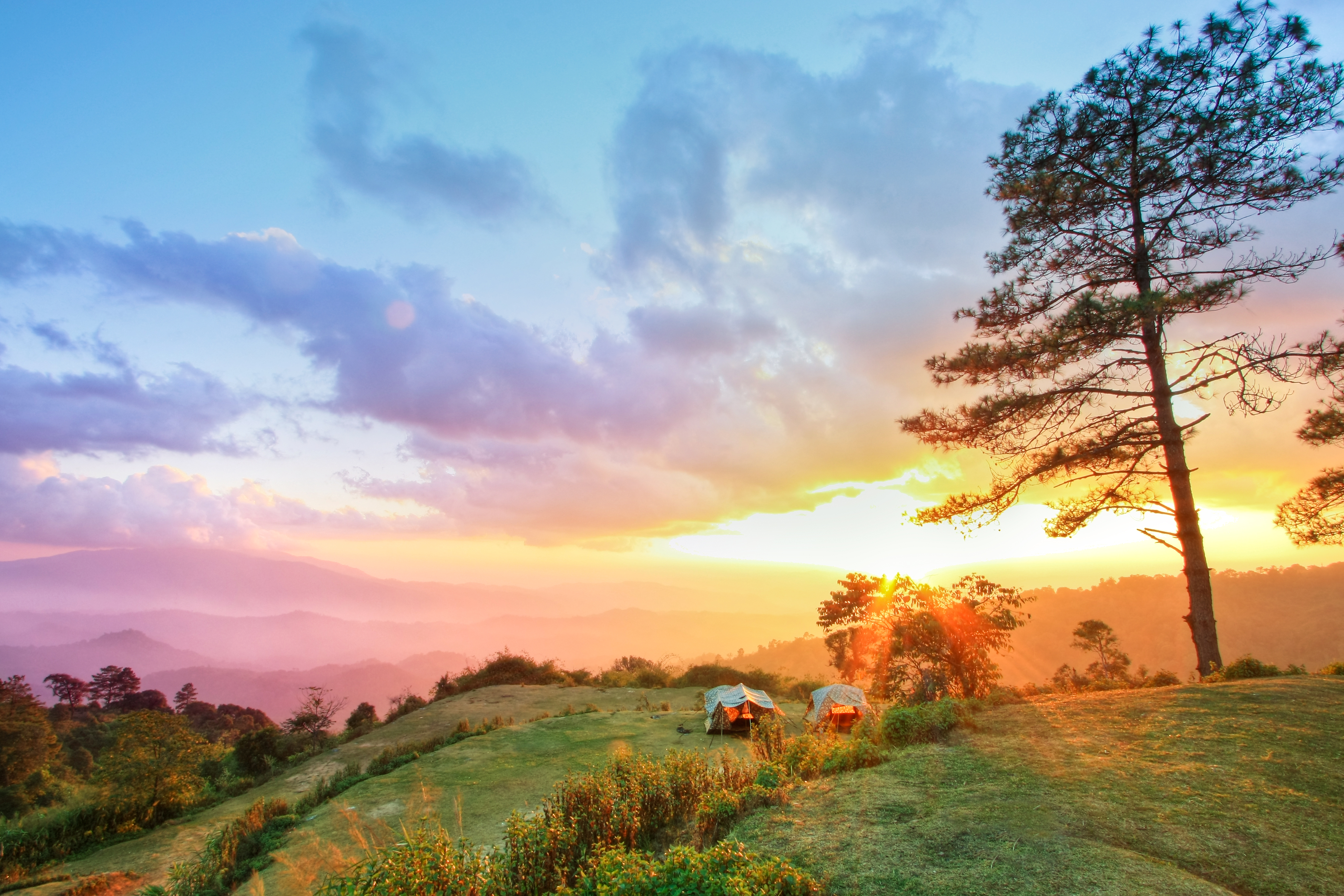
- Sunset in the park

- Location within Thailand
- Location: Thailand
- Nearest city: Chiang Mai
- Coordinates: 19°37′34″N 99°1′17″E
- Area: 1,252 km^{2} (483 sq mi)
- Established: 14 August 1995
- Visitors: 121,109 (in 2024)
- Governing body: Department of National Parks, Wildlife and Plant Conservation

Huai Nam Dang National Park (Thai: อุทยานแห่งชาติห้วยน้ำดัง) is a national park in Thailand's Mae Hong Son and Chiang Mai Provinces. This mountainous park features scenic mountain viewpoints, waterfalls, and hot springs.

== Geography ==
Huai Nam Dang National Park is direct east of Pai in Pai District of Mae Hong Son Province and about 50 kilometres (30 mi) north of Chiang Mai in the Mae Taeng and Wiang Haeng Districts of Chiang Mai Province. The park's area is 1,252 square kilometres (483 sq mi). The highest point is Doi Chang peak at 1,962 metres (6,437 ft), the height ranges from 400 metres (1,300 ft) to 1,962 metres (6,437 ft). The park's streams are the source for rivers including the Pai and Taeng.

== Climate ==
The park is generally cool all year round, with average high temperature of 23 °C (73 °F) and average lowest temperature of 8 °C (46 °F). Rainy season is from May to September, average rainfall is 1,134 millimetres (44.6 in)/year with max.temperature of 24 °C (75 °F) and min.temperature of 10 °C (50 °F). Winter is from October to February with max.temperature of 20 °C (68 °F) and min.temperature of 2 °C (36 °F). Summer is from March to April with max.temperature of 28 °C (82 °F) and min.temperature of 12 °C (54 °F).

== History ==
A survey of the Huai Nam Dang area was set up in December 1987. Later on 14 August 1995 Hui Nam Dang National Park, covers Chiang Dao, Mae Taeng and Mai Pai forests, with an area of 782,575 rai ~ 1,252 square kilometres (483 sq mi) has been declared the 81st national park.

== Attractions ==
Doi Chang and Doi Kiew Lom mountains offer popular viewpoints of neighbouring mountains and a "sea of fog" effect on winter mornings. Park namesake waterfall, Huai Nam Dang, consists of four levels and is about 50 metres (160 ft) high and 40 metres (130 ft) wide. Mae Yen is another year-round waterfall. Park hot springs include Pong Dueat, consisting of three or four large pools, and Tha Pai in the Pai District section of the park.

== Flora ==
The park is home to numerous forest types, such as evergreen, deciduous and dipterocarp forest.
Evergreen forest include:

- Ailanthus triphysa
- Palm tree
- Red pine
- Tenasserim pine

Deciduous forest include:

- Alphonsea glabrifolia
- Red cedar

Dipterocarp forest include:

- Lagerstroemia tomentosa
- Mai daeng
- Mangifera sp.
- Magnolia floribunda
- Phayom
- Pterocarpus macrocarpus
- Shorea siamensis
- Siamese sal
- Tabaek
- Takian
- Yang na

== Fauna ==
Mammals:

- Asian elephant
- Bear
- Gibbon
- Hedgehog
- Malayan porcupine
- Mongoose
- Monkey
- Palm civet
- Sambar deer
- Tiger
- Wild boar

Reptiles:

- Asian leaf turtle
- Big-headed turtle
- Boa
- Cobra
- Green snake

Birds:

Species of passerines include:

- Black occipital canary
- Bulbul
- Hill myna
- Richard's pipit
- Vernal hanging parrot

Species of non-passerines include:

- Fowl
- Hawk
- Pheasant
- Rufous-throated partridge
- Thick-billed green-pigeon

== Gallery ==
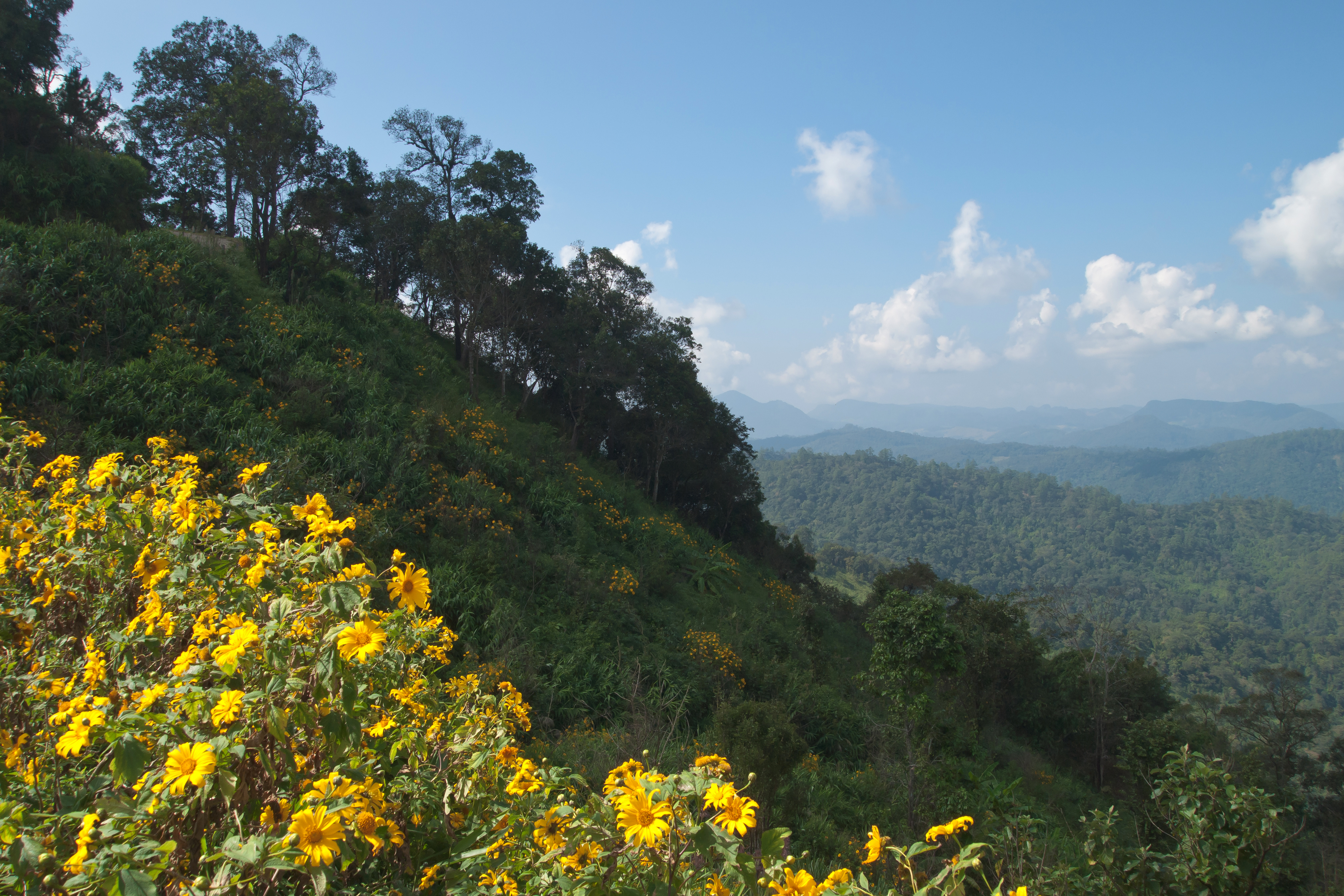
Flowers and trees on the slopes

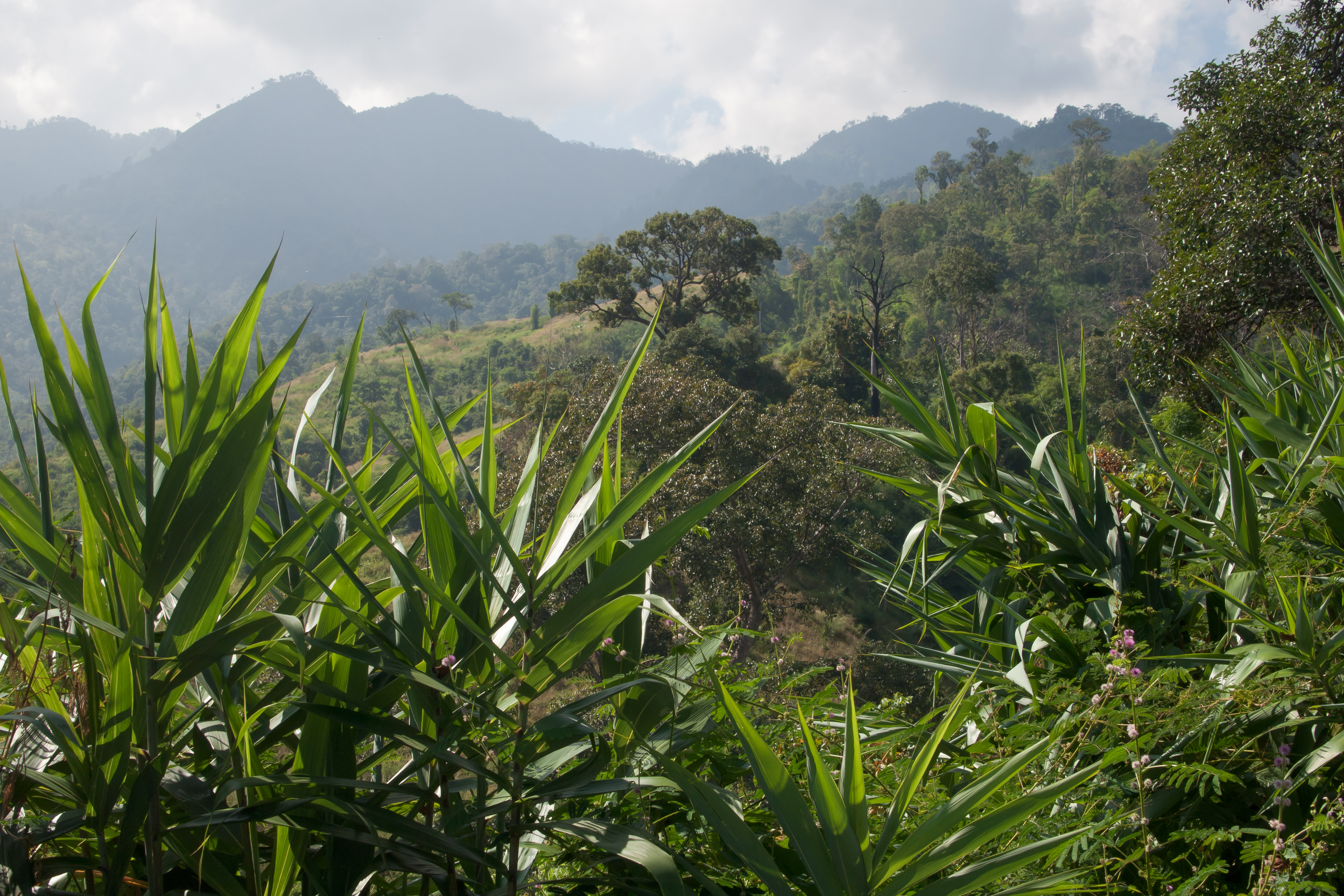
Vegetation

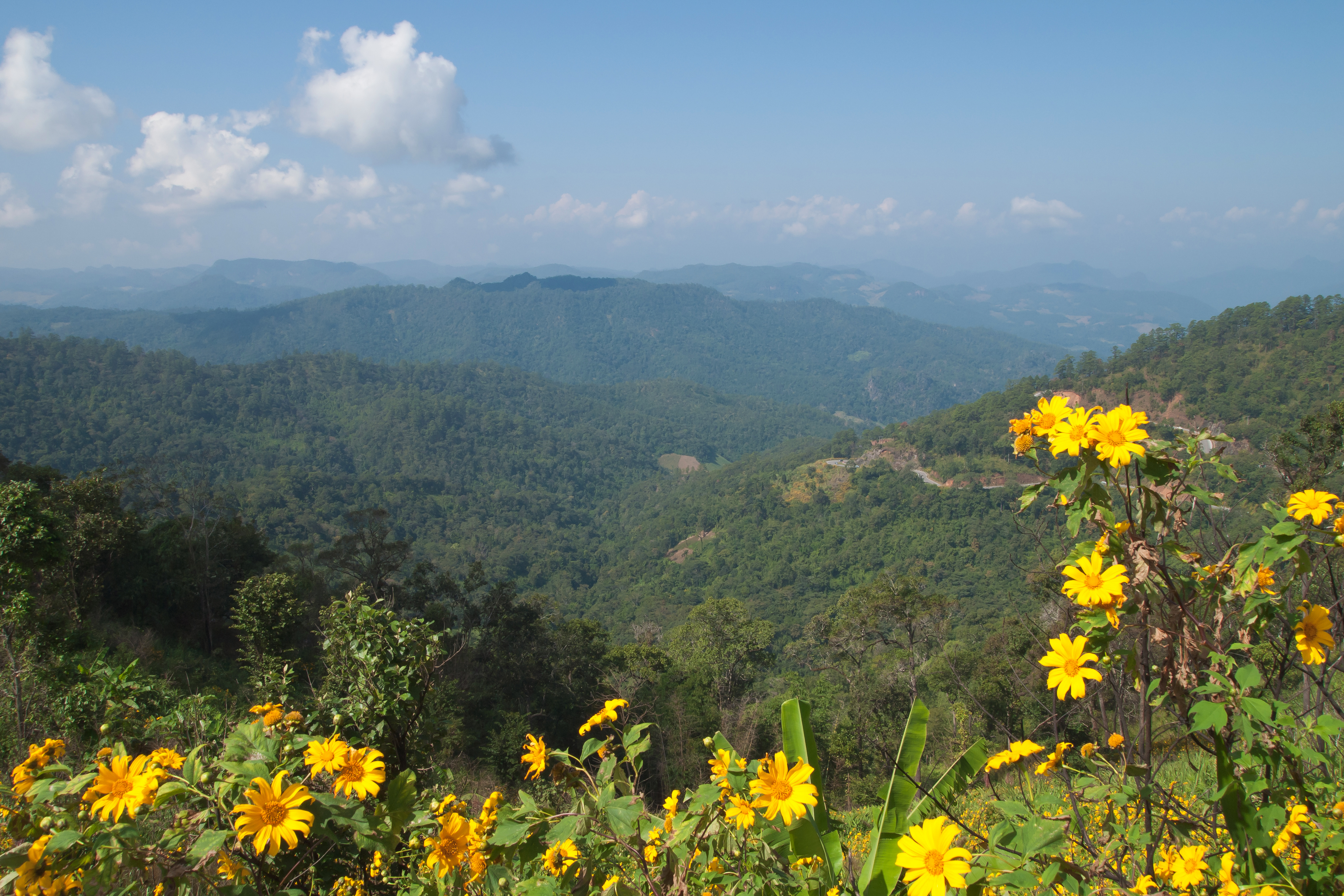
Panoramic view of the hills

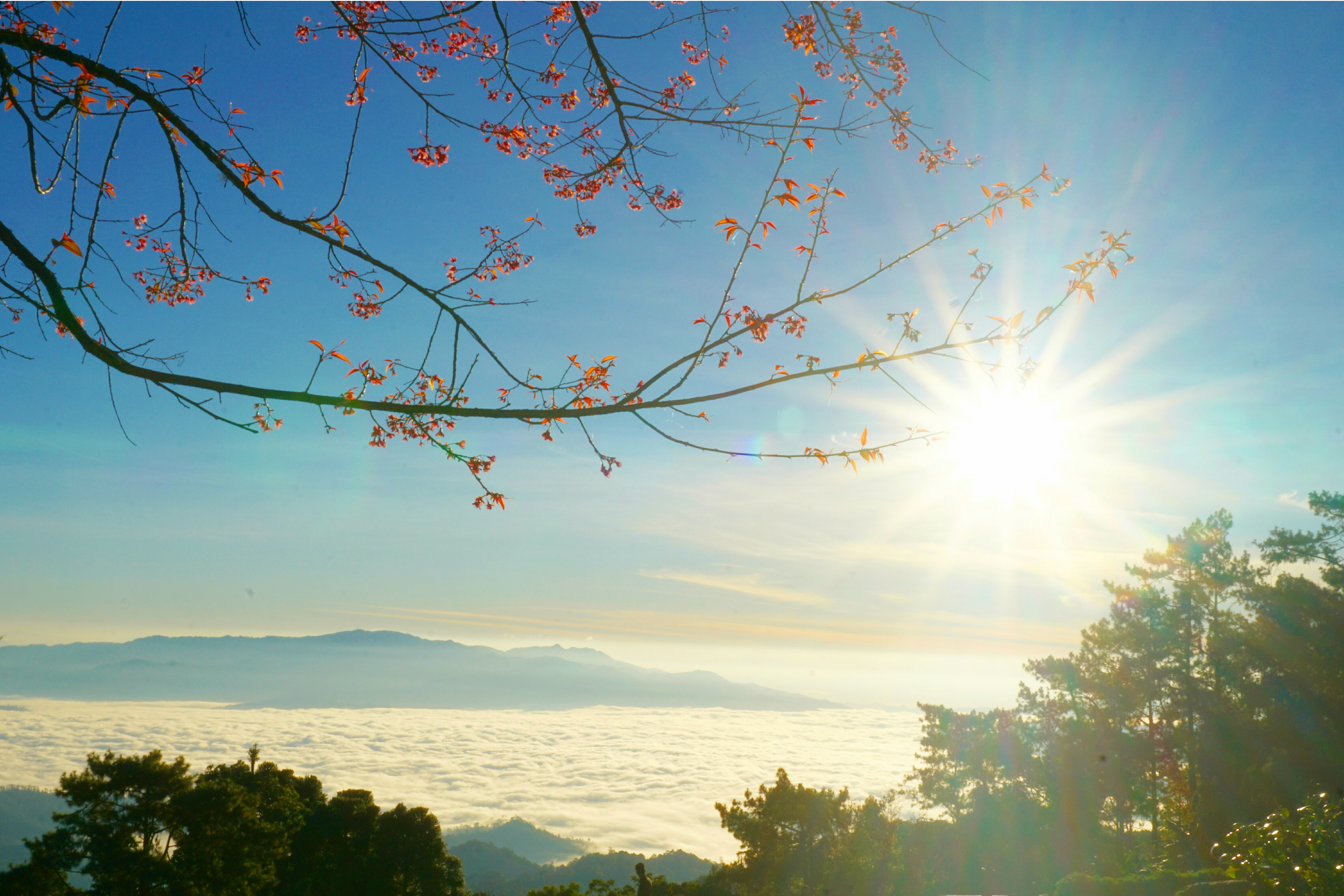
The morning scenery viewed from Doi Kio Lom Viewpoint

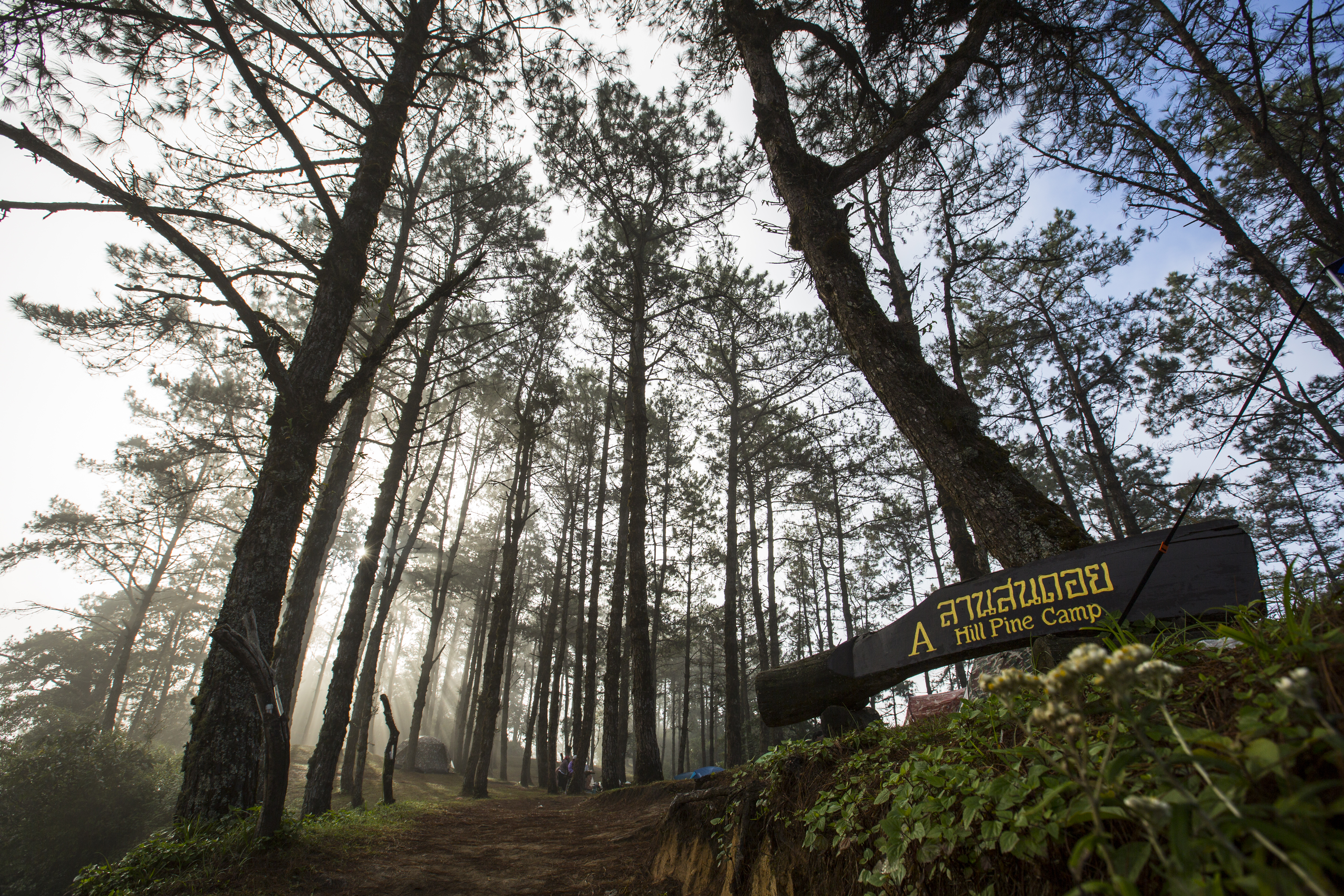
Hill Pine Camp

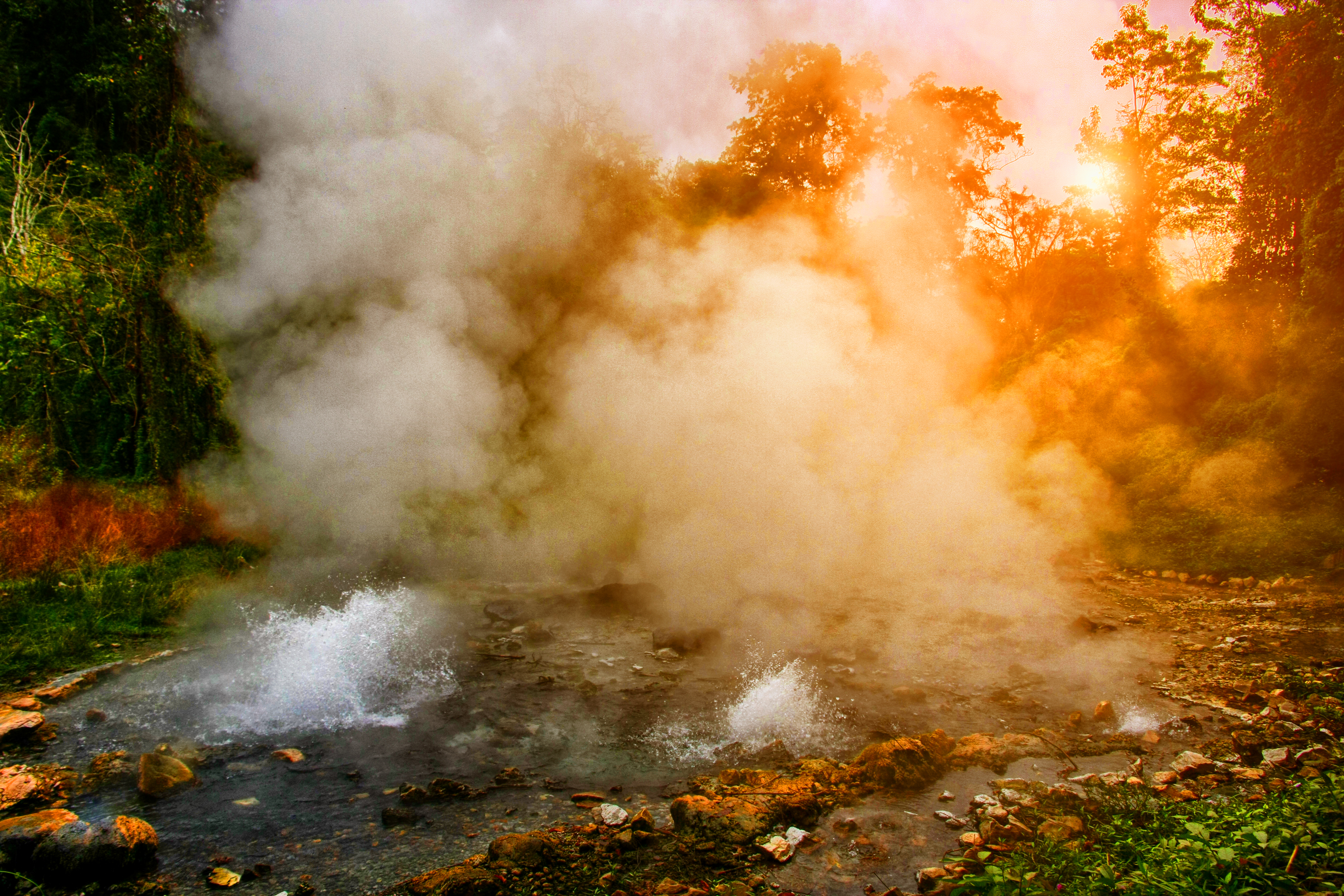
Pong Dueat Hot Springs

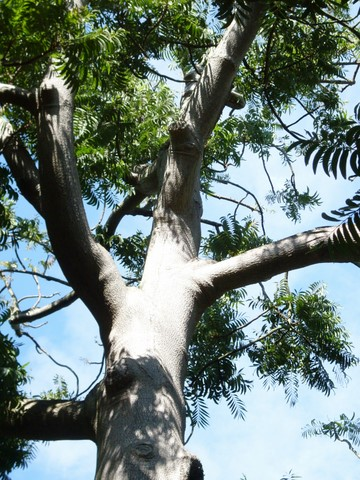
Ailanthus triphysa

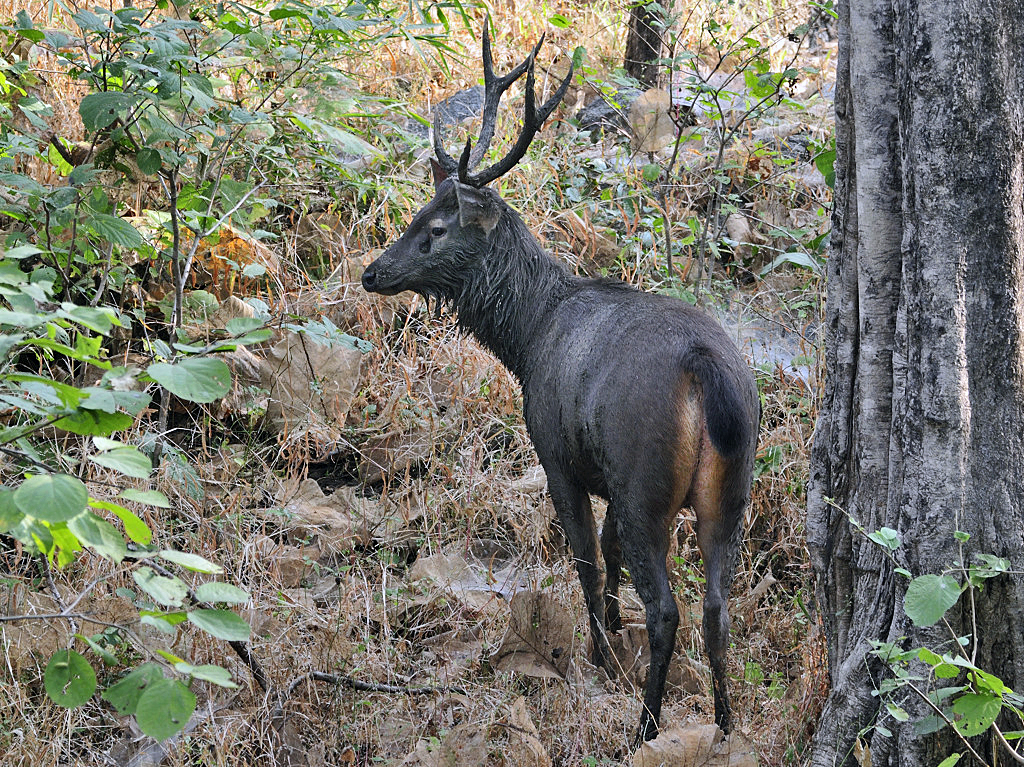
Sambar deer

== Location ==
Huai Nam Dang National Park in overview PARO 16 (Chiang Mai)

5) Huai Nam Dang National Park in overview PARO 16

	National park
1	Doi Inthanon
2	Doi Pha Hom Pok
3	Doi Suthep–Pui
4	Doi Wiang Pha
5	Huai Nam Dang
6	Khun Khan
7	Mae Ping
8	Mae Takhrai
9	Mae Tho
10	Mae Wang
11	Namtok Bua Tong– Namphu Chet Si
12	Op Khan
13	Op Luang
14	Pha Daeng
15	Si Lanna

	Wildlife sanctuary
16	Chiang Dao
17	Mae Lao–Mae Sae
18	Omkoi
19	Samoeng
	Non-hunting area
20	Doi Suthep
21	Mae Lao–Mae Sae
22	Nanthaburi
23	Pa Ban Hong
	Forest park
24	Doi Wiang Kaeo

== See also ==
- List of national parks of Thailand
- DNP - Huai Nam Dang National Park
- List of Protected Areas Regional Offices of Thailand
