= Li River (Thailand) =

River in Thailand

Coordinates: 18°26′N 98°42′E

Li River (Thai: แม่น้ำลี้; Northern Thai: น้ำแม่ลี้) is a river in Thailand with a length of 210 kilometres (130 mi). It runs through Li District and Thung Hua Chang in Lamphun Province, Thailand. It is a tributary of the Ping River. It merges into the Ping River on the left at Chom Thong District in Chiang Mai Province.
