= Ping River =

Major tributary of the Chao Phraya River

Ping river
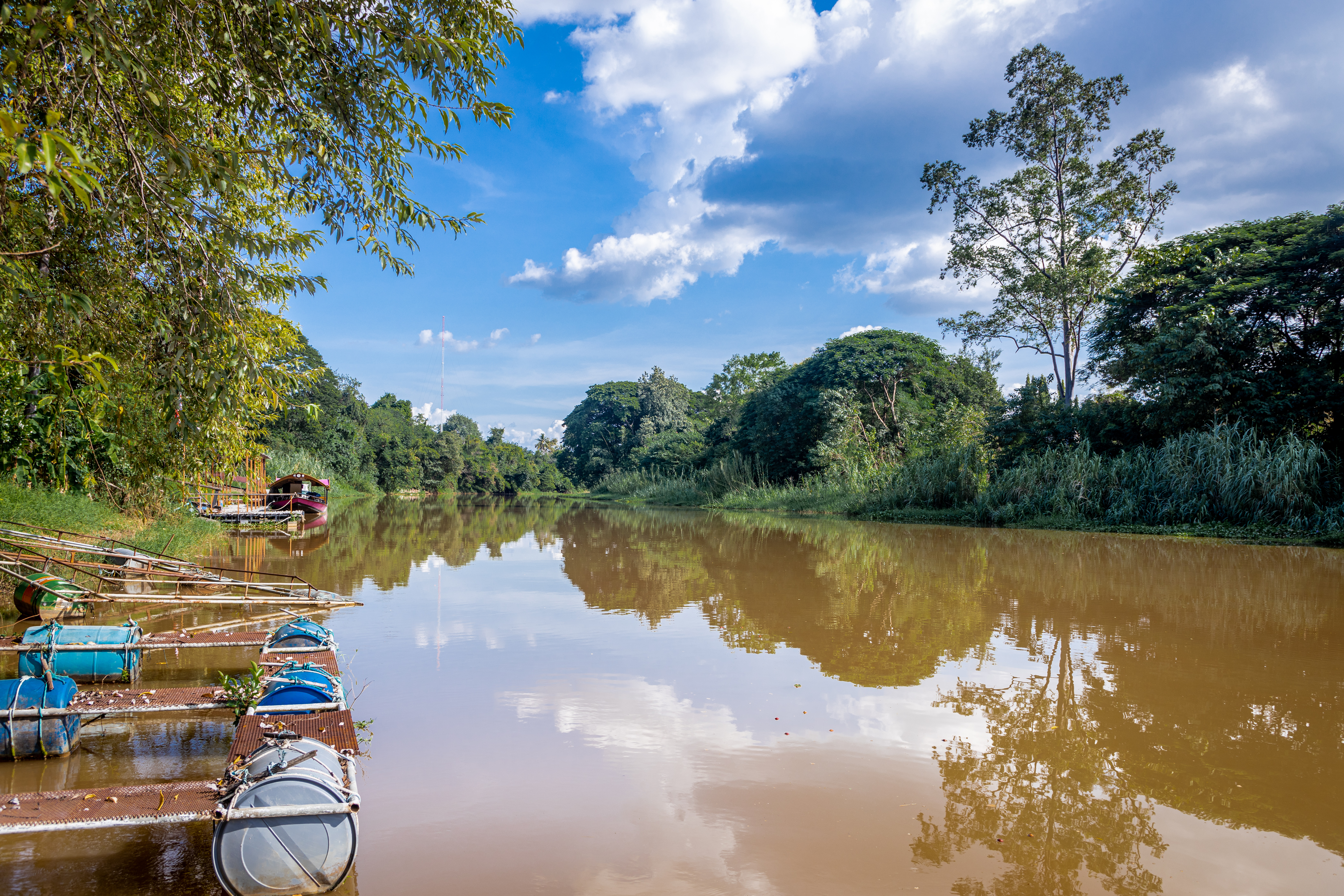
- Ping River at Chiang Mai in October 2020.

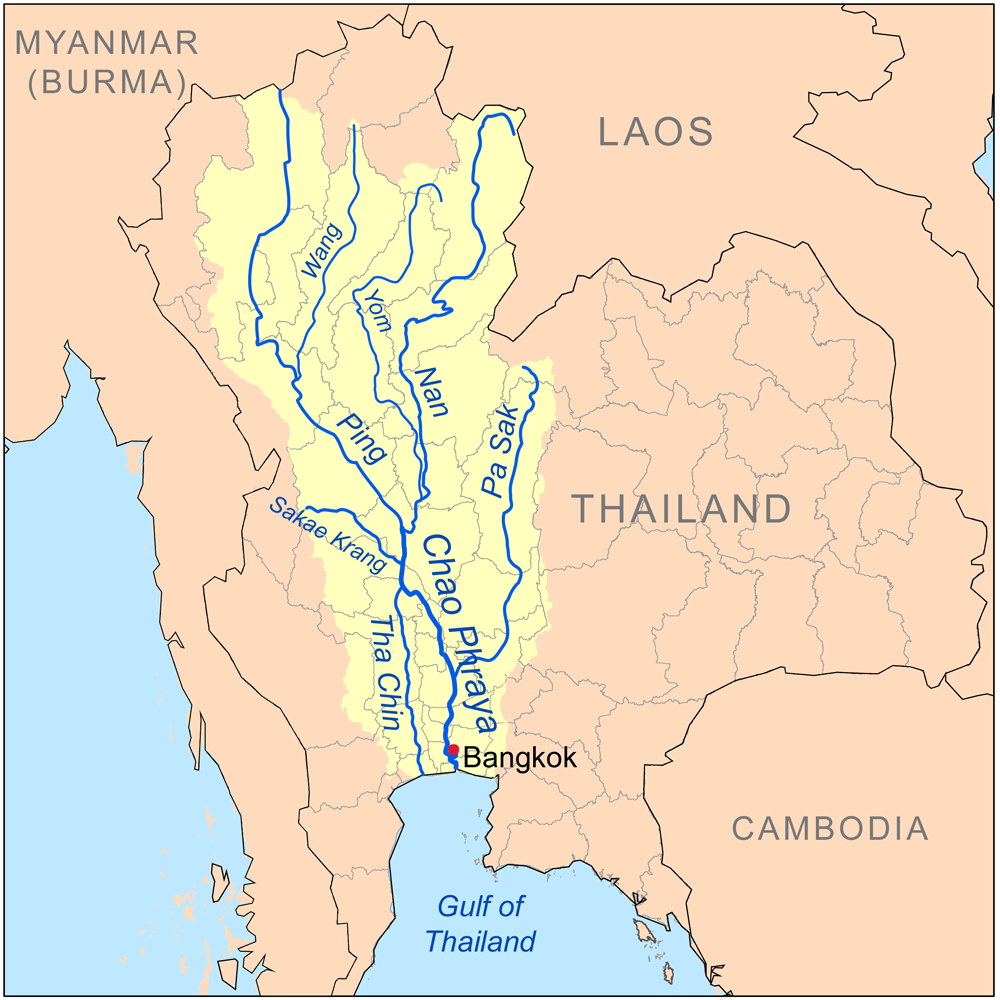
- Map of the Chao Phraya River drainage basin showing the Ping River

Location
- Country: Thailand
- District: Chiang Mai, Lamphun, Tak, Kamphaeng Phet, Nakhon Sawan
- Cities: Chiang Mai, Saraphi, San Sai, Kamphaeng Phet, Banphot Phisai

Physical characteristics
- Source: Khun Ping
  - location: Doi Thuai, Chiang Mai
  - coordinates: 19°48′45″N 98°50′20″E
  - elevation: 1,700 m (5,600 ft)
- Mouth: Chao Phraya River
  - location: Pak Nam Pho, Nakhon Sawan
  - coordinates: 15°42′04″N 100°08′31″E
  - elevation: 25 m (82 ft)
- Length: 658 km (409 mi)
- Basin size: 44,688 km^{2} (17,254 sq mi)
- Discharge
  - location: Nakhon Sawan
  - average: 265 m^{3}/s (9,400 cu ft/s)
  - maximum: 2,302 m^{3}/s (81,300 cu ft/s)

Basin features
- Progression: Chao Phraya → Gulf of Thailand
- Tributaries
  - left: Ngad River, Kwuang River, Li River, Wang River
  - right: Taeng River, Chaem River

The Ping River (Thai: แม่น้ำปิง, romanized: Maenam Ping, pronounced [mɛ̂ː.náːm pīŋ]; Northern Thai: ᨶᩣᩴ᩶ᩯᨾ᩵ᨻᩥᨦ᩠ᨣ᩺, pronounced [nâːm mɛ̂ː pīŋ]) along with the Nan River, is one of the two main tributaries of the Chao Phraya River. It originates at Doi Thuai in the Daen Lao Range, in Chiang Dao district, Chiang Mai province. After passing Chiang Mai, it flows through the provinces of Lamphun, Tak and Kamphaeng Phet. At the confluence with the Nan at Nakhon Sawan (also named Paknam Pho in Thai), it forms the Chao Phraya.

== History ==
Evidence shows that habitation along the Ping River dates back to 1500 BCE. At that time it controlled trading routes between Yunnan and the Chao Phraya basin. Mangrai, a ruler from Ngoenyang, turned south to create an alternative "silk road" along the Ping River and captured Haripunchai in 1281. Following his successful conquest, he created Wiang Kum Kam as his capital before abandoning it following nearly a decade of floods, finally moving kilometres north to establish Chiang Mai as the capital of the Kingdom of Lanna in 1296.

In the 20th century, the Ping River became a part of Siam. Chinese and foreign investors came to area in search of lucrative teak and business transactions. Missionaries built Chiang Mai’s first church along the eastern bank of the river, an area set aside for foreign residents by the ruling government who occupied the safe, flood-free western banks. Land along the banks, including its islands, were repurposed, such as a small island in the river that was donated to American missionary James W. McKean in 1907 to become a leper colony. With no cure for leprosy until the 1980s, lepers found relief in their sanctuary from social criticism, many of whom remain at the McKean Rehabilitation Centre today.

== Tributaries ==
- Khlung River (2)
- Suan Mak River (Joins the Ping at 16°29′42″N 99°29′56″E)
- Wang Chao River (Joins the Ping at 16°41′02″N 99°16′16″E)
- Pra Dang River (Joins the Ping at 16°44′46″N 99°13′05″E)
- Raka River (Placement in tributary tree is approximate, geographical coordinates unavailable due to poor satellite resolution)
- Wang River (Joins the Ping at 17°07′25″N 99°03′35″E in the town of Tak)
  - Tributaries include Mo, Tui, Chang & Soi Rivers
- Tak River (Joins the Ping at 17°02′18″N 99°04′00″E)
- Ko River (Joins the Ping at 17°41′17″N 98°45′01″E)
- Tun River (Placement in tributary tree is approximate, geographical coordinates unavailable due to poor satellite resolution)
- Pa River
- Chaem River (Joins the Ping at 18°11′19″N 98°38′02″E)
- Klang River (Joins the Ping at 18°22′12″N 98°40′55″E)
- Li River (Joins the Ping at 18°25′43″N 98°42′08″E)
- Tun River (2) (Placement in tributary tree is approximate, geographical coordinates unavailable due to poor satellite resolution)
- Khan River (2) (Joins the Ping at 18°30′05″N 98°51′04″E)
  - Wang River (2) (Joins the Khan at 18°32′58″N 98°51′37″E)
- Kuang River (Joins the Ping at 18°32′33″N 98°56′07″E)
  - Tha River (Joins Kuang at 18°32′23″N 98°56′29″E)
    - Sapuat River (Placement in tributary tree is approximate, geographical coordinates unavailable due to inaccurate station data from Royal Irrigation Department)
- Khanat River (Placement in tributary tree is approximate, geographical coordinates unavailable due to poor satellite resolution)
- San River (Placement in tributary tree is approximate, geographical coordinates presently undeterminable due to recently built dam)
- Tip River (Placement in tributary tree is approximate, geographical coordinates presently undeterminable due to recently built dam)
- Phaem River (Placement in tributary tree is approximate, geographical coordinates unavailable due to poor satellite resolution)
- Mempin River (Placement in tributary tree is approximate, geographical coordinates unavailable due to poor satellite resolution)
- Lai River (2) (Placement in tributary tree is approximate, geographical coordinates unavailable due to poor satellite resolution)
- Sa River (Joins the Ping at 18°53′28″N 98°58′22″E)
- Rim River (Joins the Ping at 18°55′13″N 98°58′02″E)
- Nai River (Placement in tributary tree is approximate, geographical coordinates unavailable due to poor satellite resolution)
- Taeng River (Joins the Ping at 19°06′08″N 98°56′49″E)
- Ngat River (Joins the Ping at 19°09′11″N 99°00′44″E)

== Basin ==
The Ping basin is one of the largest drainage basins of the Chao Phraya Watershed, draining 33,896 square kilometres (13,087 mi^{2}) of land. The greater Ping basin—the basin of the entire Ping river system including its tributary the Wang River—drains a total of 44,688 square kilometres (17,254 mi^{2}). The main dams in the basin are the Bhumibol Dam and the Doi Tao Dam.

== National parks ==
The Ping originates in Huai Nam Dang National Park and flows through Mae Ping National Park.

== Gallery ==
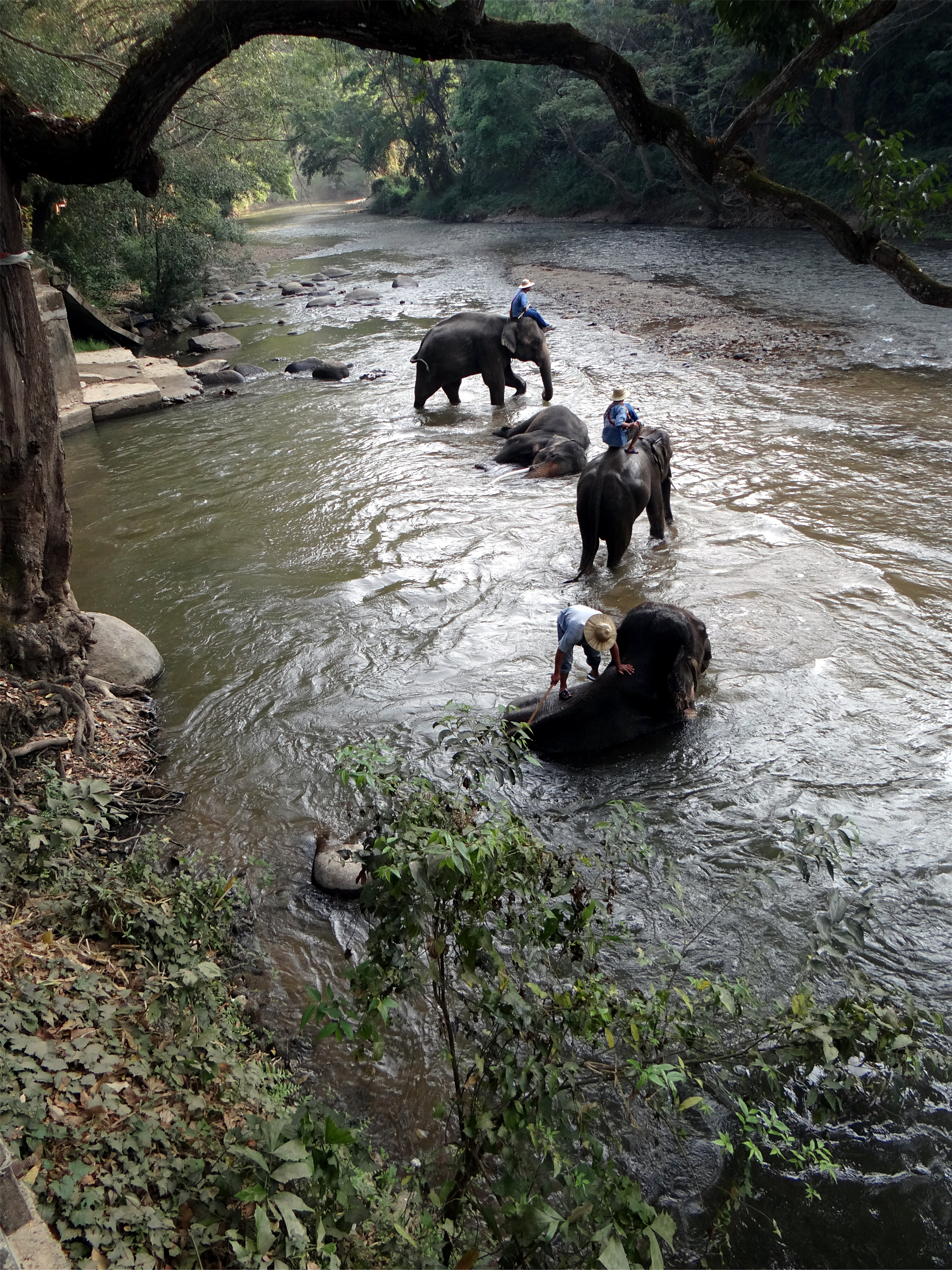
Bathing elephants in the Taeng River, a Ping tributary

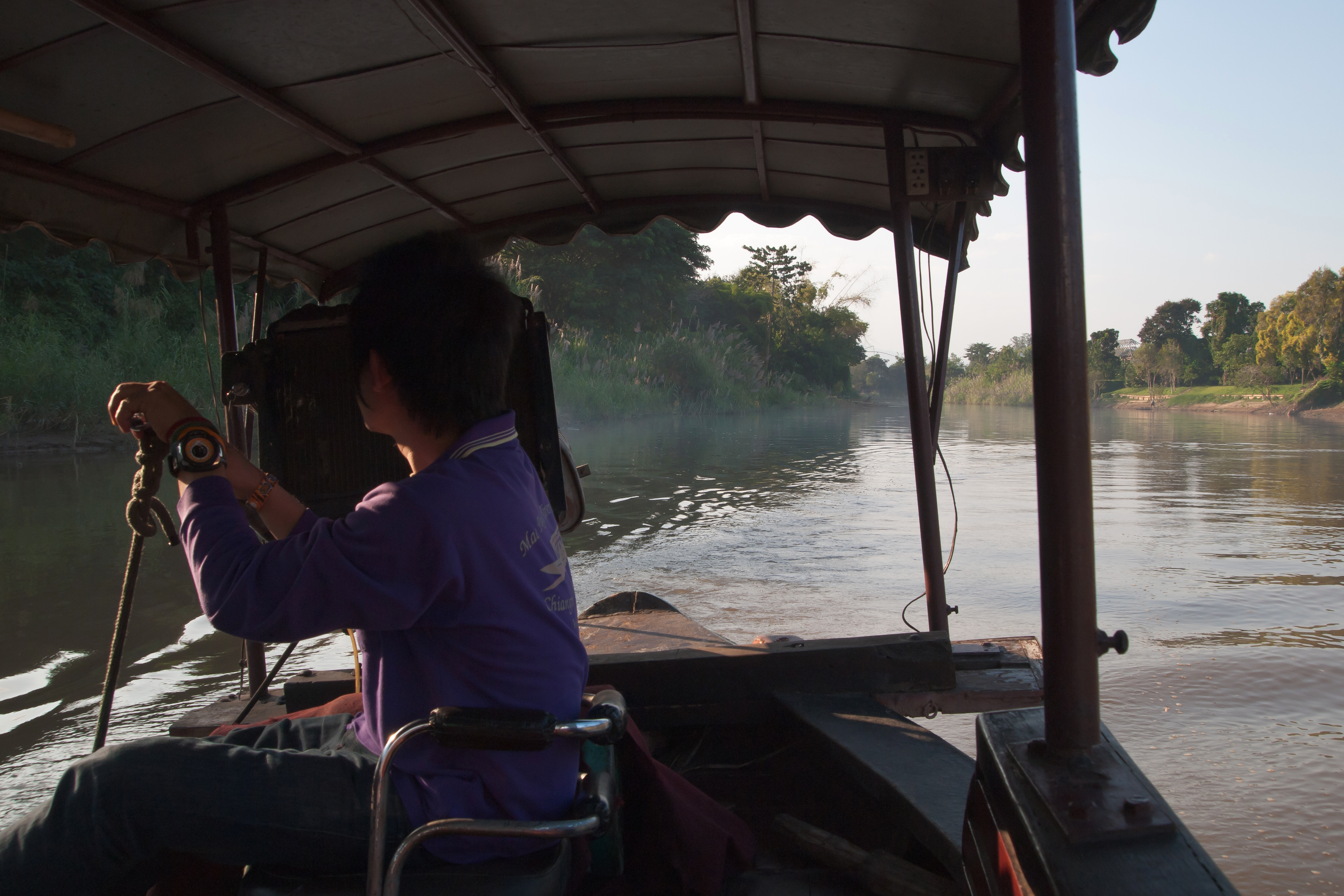
Ping River north of Chiang Mai

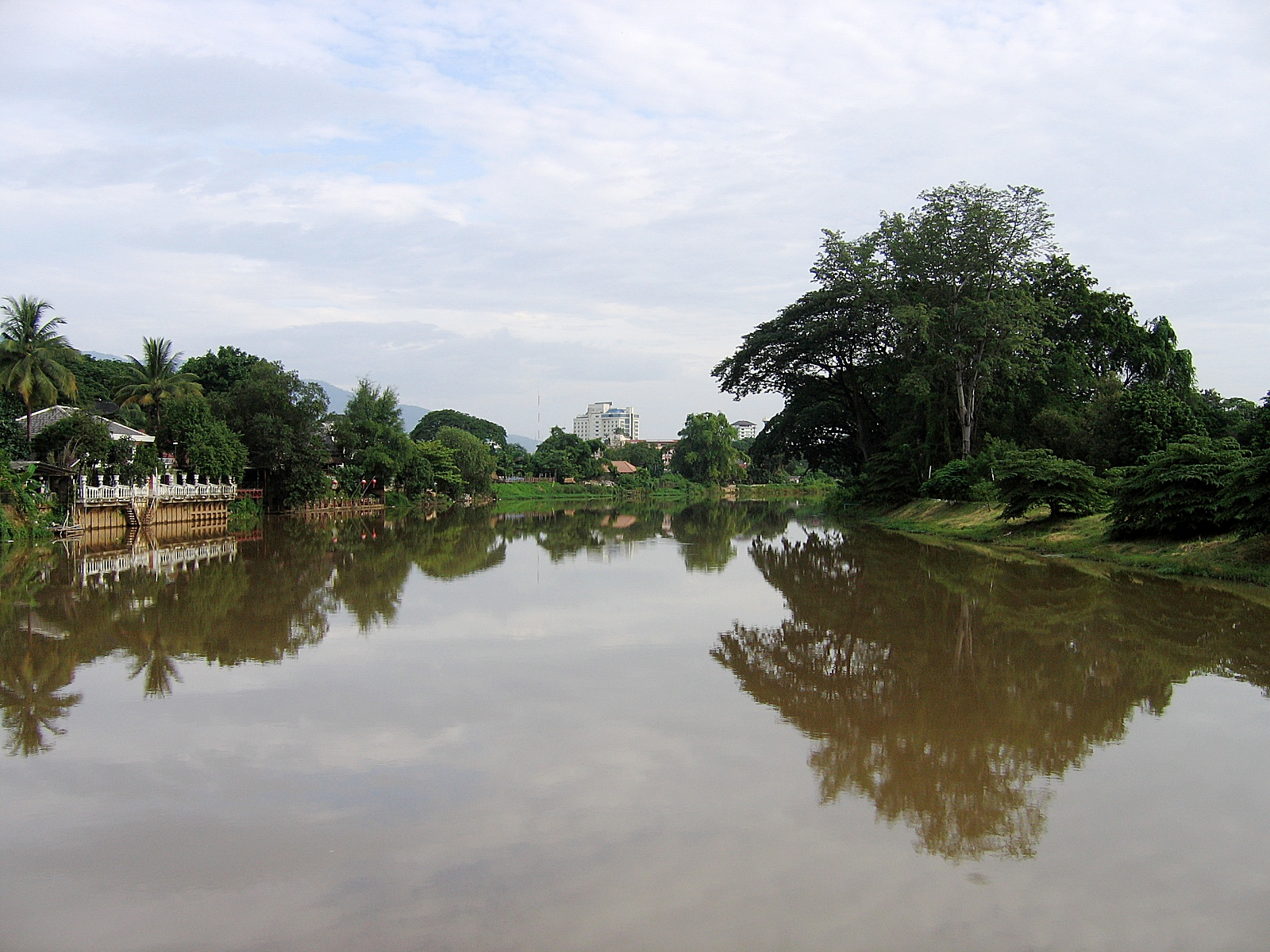
Ping River, northern outskirts of Chiang Mai

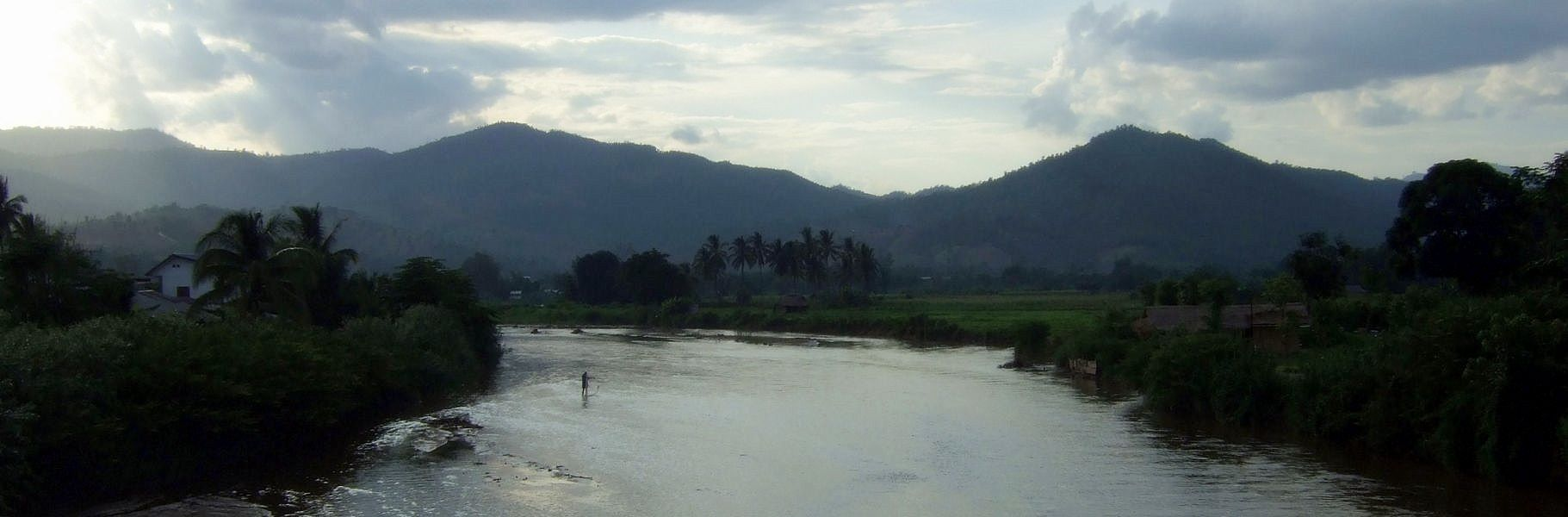
A Ping tributary, the Chaem River flows through the town of Mae Chaem

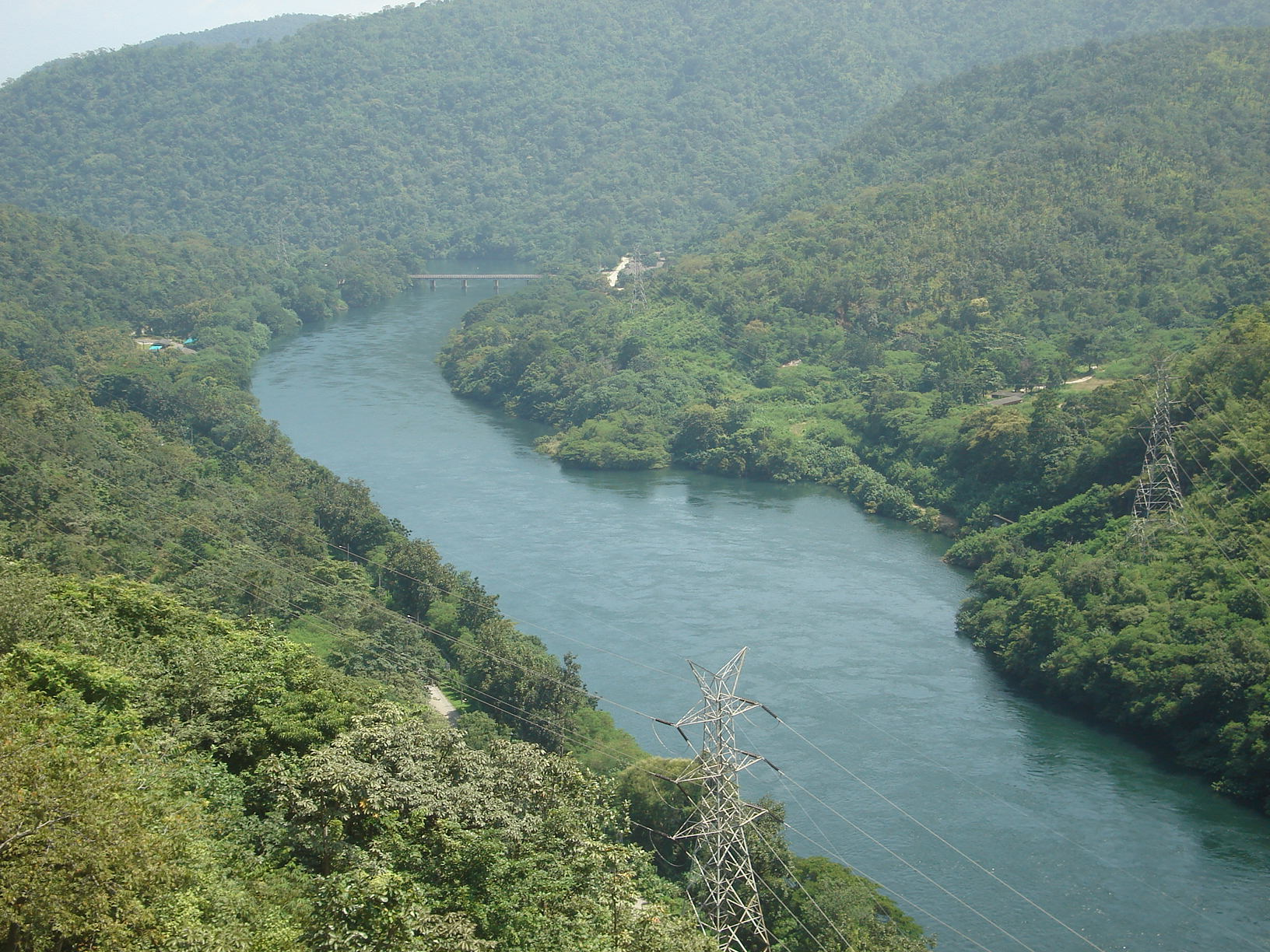
Ping River, upstream from the Bhumibol Dam

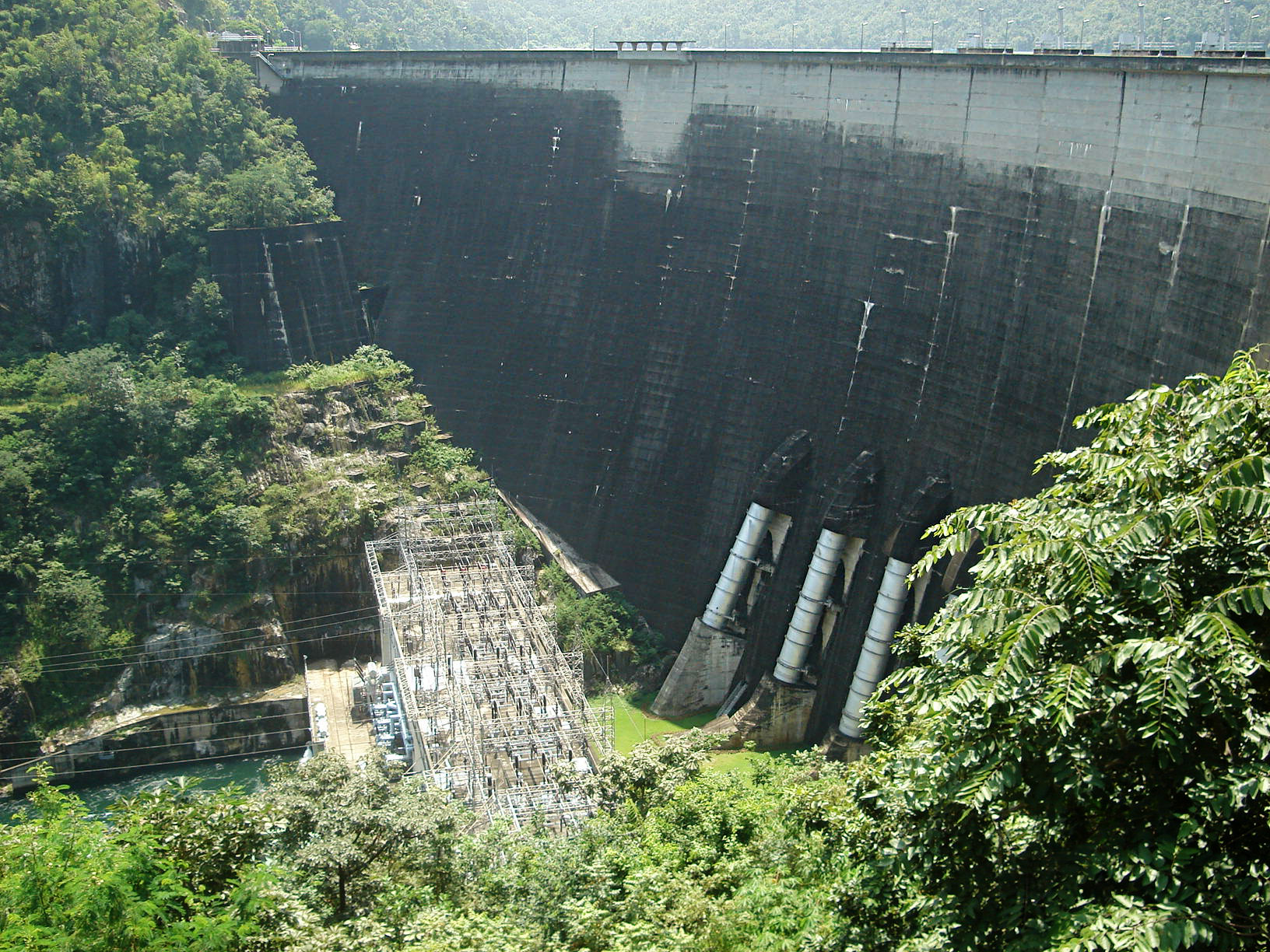
Bhumibol Dam, 154 metres (505 ft) long, creating a reservoir with a surface area of 300 square kilometres (120 mi^{2}).

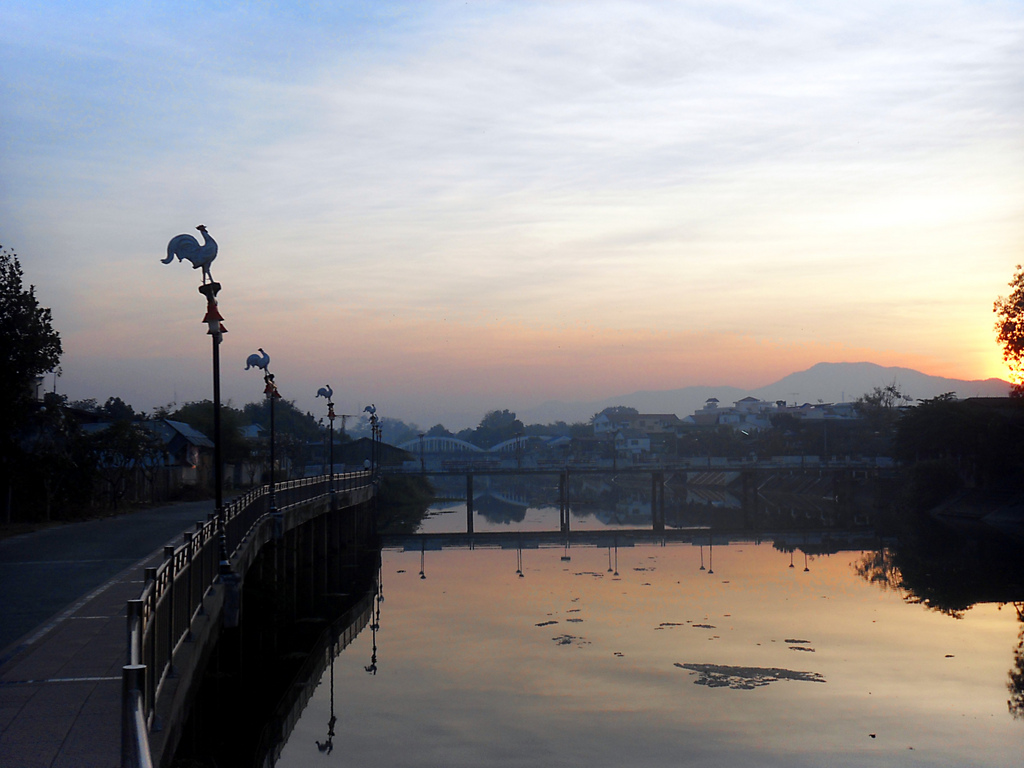
Wang River, the main tributary of the Ping, flowing through Lampang

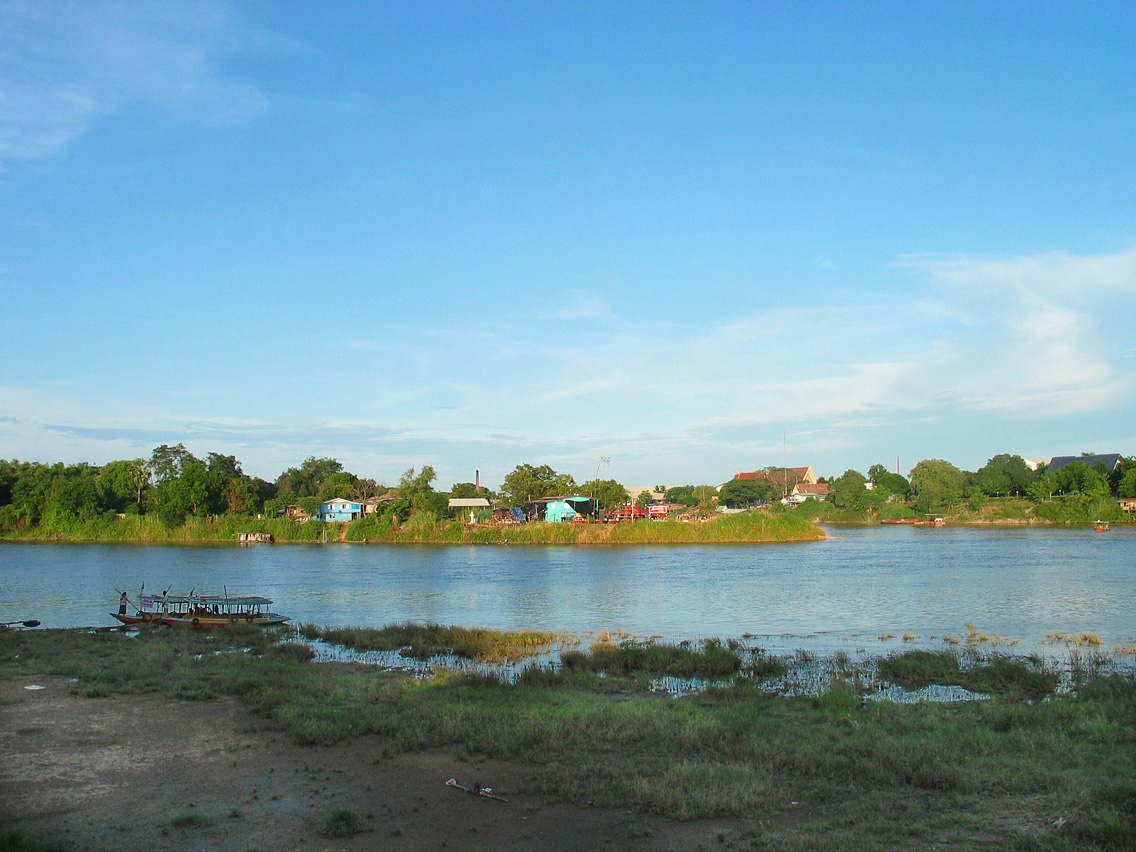
Confluence of the Ping with the Nan River at Nakhon Sawan
