= Doi Chiang Dao =

Mountain in Chiang Mai Province, Thailand

- ดอยเชียงดาว
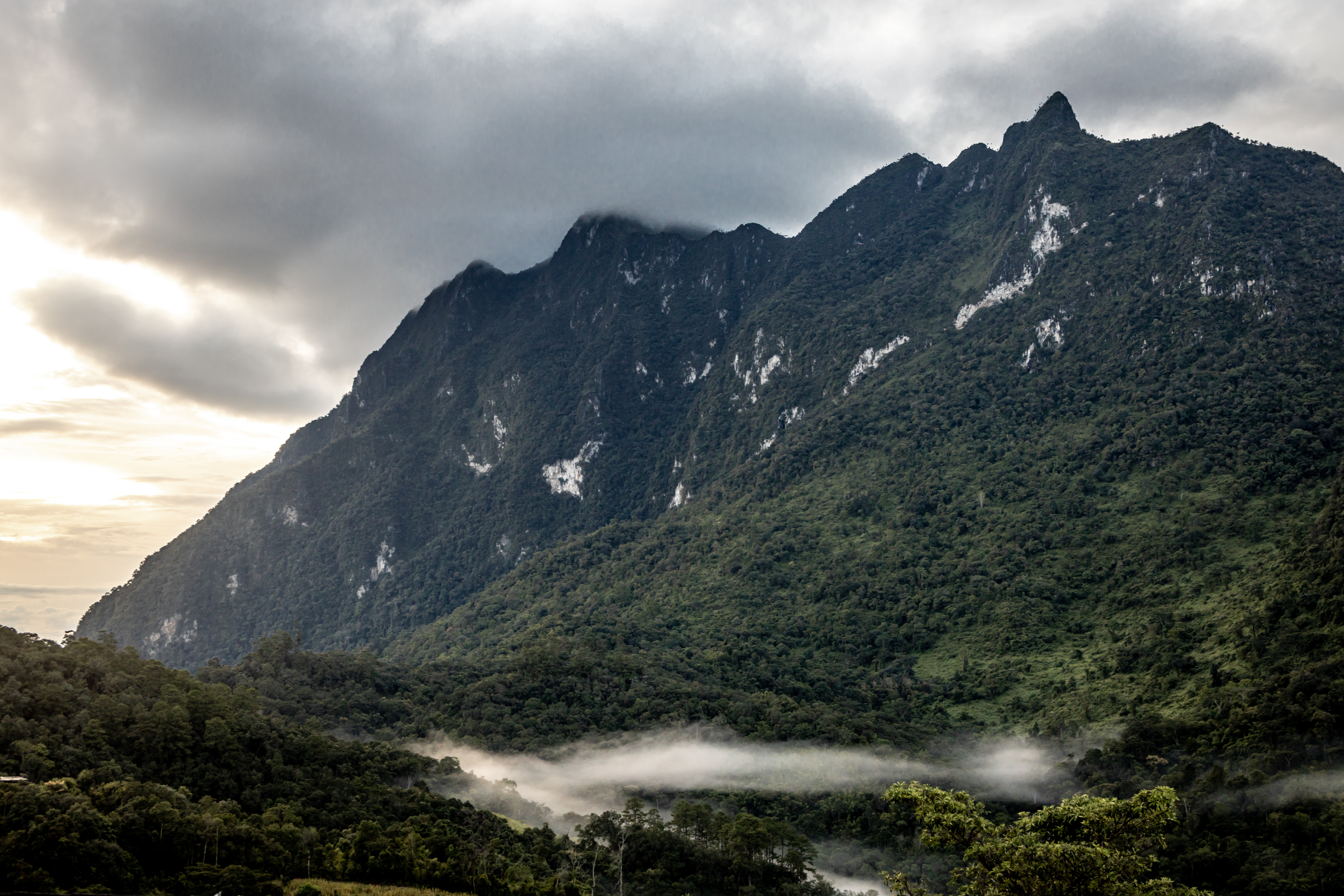

Highest point
- Elevation: 2,175 m (7,136 ft)
- Prominence: 1,249 m (4,098 ft)
- Listing: List of mountains in Thailand; Ribu
- Coordinates: 19°23′59″N 98°52′36″E

Geography
- Location within Thailand
- Location: Thailand
- Parent range: Daen Lao Range

Geology
- Mountain type: Limestone

Climbing
- First ascent: unknown
- Easiest route: Hike (approval is required)

Doi Chiang Dao (Thai: ดอยเชียงดาว, pronounced [dɔ̄ːj tɕʰīaŋ dāːw]; Northern Thai: ดอยเจียงดาว, pronounced [dɔ̄ːj tɕīaŋ dāːw]), also known as Doi Luang Chiang Dao (Thai: ดอยหลวงเชียงดาว, pronounced [dɔ̄ːj lǔaŋ tɕʰīaŋ dāːw]; Northern Thai: ดอยหลวงเจียงดาว, pronounced [dɔ̄ːj lǔaŋ tɕīaŋ dāːw]), is a 2,175 metres (7,136 ft) high mountain in Chiang Dao District of Chiang Mai Province, Thailand. It is one of the highest peaks of the Daen Lao Range on the Thai side of the border.

Doi Chiang Dao is part of a limestone massif located 6 kilometres (3.7 mi) west-northwest of Chiang Dao town and less than 40 kilometres (25 mi) south of the border with Myanmar at the eastern end of the Thai highlands. This mountain is part of Chiang Dao Wildlife Sanctuary, south of Pha Daeng National Park.

Doi Chiang Dao is one of the most visited birdwatching sites in Thailand with over 300 species of birds, including rare species such as the giant nuthatch and Hume's pheasant.

There is a famous cave temple called Wat Tham Chiang Dao, located in the foothills of the mountain.

In 2021, UNESCO declared Doi Chiang Dao to be biosphere reserve, counted as the fifth site in Thailand (after Sakaerat, Hauy Tak Teak, Mae Sa-Kog Ma, Ranong).

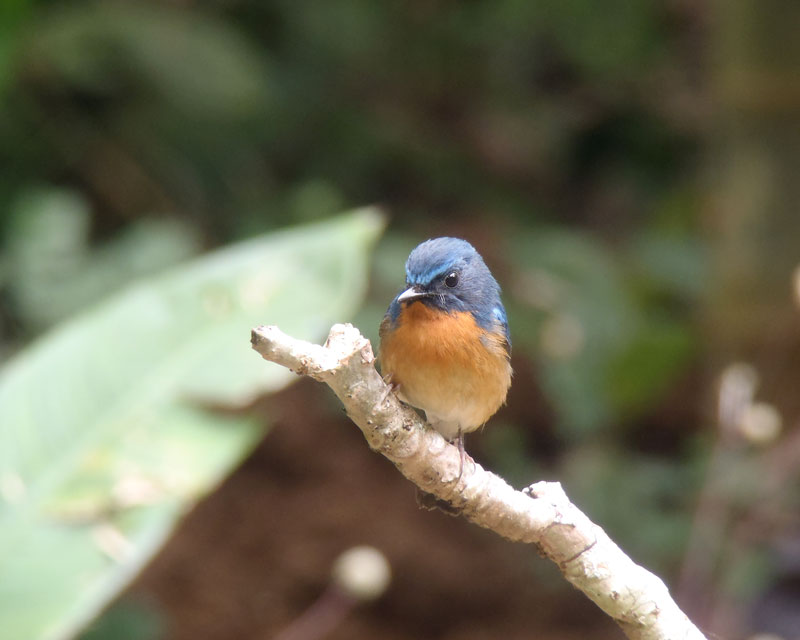
Hill blue flycatcher taken on the mountain.

== See also ==
- Chiang Dao Wildlife Sanctuary
- List of mountains in Thailand
