= Mueang Haeng =

Coordinates: 19°33′N 98°39′E

Mueang Haeng เมืองแหง
- Tambon
- Interactive map of Mueang Haeng
- Country: Thailand
- Province: Chiang Mai
- District: Wiang Haeng

Population (2005)
  - Total: 8,631
- Time zone: UTC+7 (ICT)

Mueang Haeng (Thai: เมืองแหง) is a tambon (subdistrict) of Wiang Haeng District, in Chiang Mai Province, Thailand. In 2005 it had a population of 8,631 people. The tambon contains 12 villages.
