= Piang Luang =

Piang Luang เปียงหลวง
- Tambon
- Location within Thailand
- Country: Thailand
- Province: Chiang Mai
- District: Wiang Haeng

Population (2005)
  - Total: 16,757
- Time zone: UTC+7 (ICT)

Piang Luang (Thai: เปียงหลวง) is a tambon (subdistrict) of Wiang Haeng District, in Chiang Mai Province, Thailand. In 2005 it had a population of 16,757 people. The tambon contains nine villages. The town lies near the border with Shan State, Burma. During the 1960s to the 1980s, it was the headquarter of the Shan United Revolutionary Army.
