= Wiang Haeng district =

Wiang Haeng เวียงแหง
- District
- Laowu Gate

- District location in Chiang Mai province
- Coordinates: 19°33′34″N 98°38′8″E
- Country: Thailand
- Province: Chiang Mai
- Seat: Mueang Haeng

Area
  - Total: 672.2 km^{2} (259.5 sq mi)

Population (2005)
  - Total: 28,876
  - Density: 93.8/km^{2} (243/sq mi)
- Time zone: UTC+7 (ICT)
- Postal code: 50350
- Geocode: 5020

Wiang Haeng (Thai: เวียงแหง, pronounced [wīa̯ŋ hɛ̌ːŋ]) is a district (amphoe) in the northern part of Chiang Mai province, northern Thailand.

== History ==
The area of tambon Wiang was very far from Chiang Dao district center. The government separated Tambon Mueang Haeng and Piang Luang to create a minor district (king amphoe) on 5 May 1981. It was upgraded to a full district on 4 November 1993.

Wiang Haeng is believed to be the place where King Naresuan died in 1605 when he and his army went to war with Ava. At present, there are many archaeological sites that are believed to be built to commemorate him. But the place of his death remains a controversy in Thai history.

== Geography ==
Neighboring districts are (from the northeast clockwise) Chiang Dao of Chiang Mai Province, Pai of Mae Hong Son province and Shan State of Myanmar.

The source of the Taeng River lies in the mountains of the Daen Lao Range in the north of the district.

== Administration ==
The district is divided into three sub-districts (tambon), which are further subdivided into 26 villages (muban). There are no municipal (thesaban) areas, and three tambon administrative organizations (TAO).

No.	Name	Thai name	Villages	Pop.
1.	Mueang Haeng	เมืองแหง	12	8,631
2.	Piang Luang	เปียงหลวง	9	16,757
3.	Saen Hai	แสนไห	5	3,488

== Ban Wiang Haeng ==
Ban Wiang Haeng (Thai: บ้านเวียงแหง) is a village in Mueang Haeng Subdistrict, Wiang Haeng District, Chiang Mai Province, northern Thailand. The village is an important administrative settlement within the district and is home to the Wiang Haeng District Office, which serves as the principal administrative center for local government operations and public services.

Down town of Wiang Heang

The village occupies a central position in the administrative organization of Wiang Haeng District. Its location within Mueang Haeng Subdistrict places it at the heart of district-level administration, connecting surrounding communities with government offices and public services. The district office is situated in Village No. 3 of Mueang Haeng Subdistrict.

Ban Wiang Haeng is also regarded locally as one of the major settlements in the district and is commonly described as the second-largest village in Wiang Haeng District after Ban Piang Luang. Its administrative significance and established position within Mueang Haeng Subdistrict make it an important settlement in the district's local geography.

== Ban Piang Luang ==
Ban Piang Luang (Thai: บ้านเปียงหลวง; Shan: ပဵင်းလူင်) is a village in Piang Luang Subdistrict, Wiang Haeng District, Chiang Mai Province, northern Thailand. Located near the Thai–Myanmar border, the village is one of the major settlements in Wiang Haeng District and is widely known for its Shan (Tai Yai) cultural heritage, historical connections with Shan communities in Myanmar, and ethnic diversity.

font of wat Piang Luang

=== History ===
The settlement of Ban Piang Luang is associated with the migration of Shan merchants and families from Shan State in present-day Myanmar. According to local historical accounts, a group of Shan and northern Thai merchants established an early settlement in the area around 1928. The name Piang Luang is associated with the extensive plain on which the settlement developed, reflecting the area's geographical characteristics.

During the twentieth century, the village became closely connected with the political and military history of Shan communities along the Thai–Myanmar border. Shan political movements and armed organizations operated in the surrounding border region, and Piang Luang became an important location for coordination and settlement among Shan soldiers and their families. These historical developments contributed to the growth of the village and its distinctive social composition.

=== Population and settlement size ===
Ban Piang Luang is widely regarded as the largest village in Wiang Haeng District, Chiang Mai Province. The settlement is characterized by its extensive residential area and diverse population, comprising several ethnic communities, including Shan (Tai Yai), Lisu, Chinese, and northern Thai residents. According to community demographic data published by the Princess Maha Chakri Sirindhorn Anthropology Centre, Ban Piang Luang had a registered population of 15,035 people and 2,540 households in December 2023.

Its population size and settlement characteristics distinguish Ban Piang Luang as one of the principal population centers of Wiang Haeng District, alongside Ban Wiang Haeng, the district's administrative center.

=== Population and ethnic communities ===
Ban Piang Luang is characterized by a diverse population, including Shan (Tai Yai), Thai, Lisu, and people of Chinese descent, among other ethnic communities. Many Shan residents have historical family connections to Shan State, while other groups migrated to the area through different historical processes. The coexistence of these communities has contributed to the village's cultural diversity and local identity.

Geography of Ban Piang Luang

Shan cultural traditions remain an important part of community life. Language, religious practices, festivals, and traditional customs contribute to the preservation of cultural identity among residents. Buddhist institutions and community ceremonies also play an important role in maintaining social relationships and cultural continuity.

=== Geography and economy ===
The village is situated in a mountainous border region of northern Thailand, with surrounding agricultural land and natural landscapes. Its proximity to Myanmar has historically influenced settlement patterns, trade, migration, and social relationships between communities on both sides of the border.

Agriculture is an important source of livelihood for residents of Piang Luang Subdistrict. Crops cultivated in the area include rice, garlic, maize, vegetables, and various commercial crops. Livestock raising and small-scale local economic activities also contribute to household income.

Font of Piang Luang Market

=== Cultural significance ===
Ban Piang Luang is recognized for its ethnic diversity and distinctive Shan cultural heritage. Community-based tourism initiatives have sought to introduce visitors to the village's history, traditional lifestyle, cultural practices, and the experiences of ethnic communities living in the Thai–Myanmar border region. These initiatives emphasize cultural learning and local community participation.
