= Chiang Dao district =

Chiang Dao เชียงดาว
- District
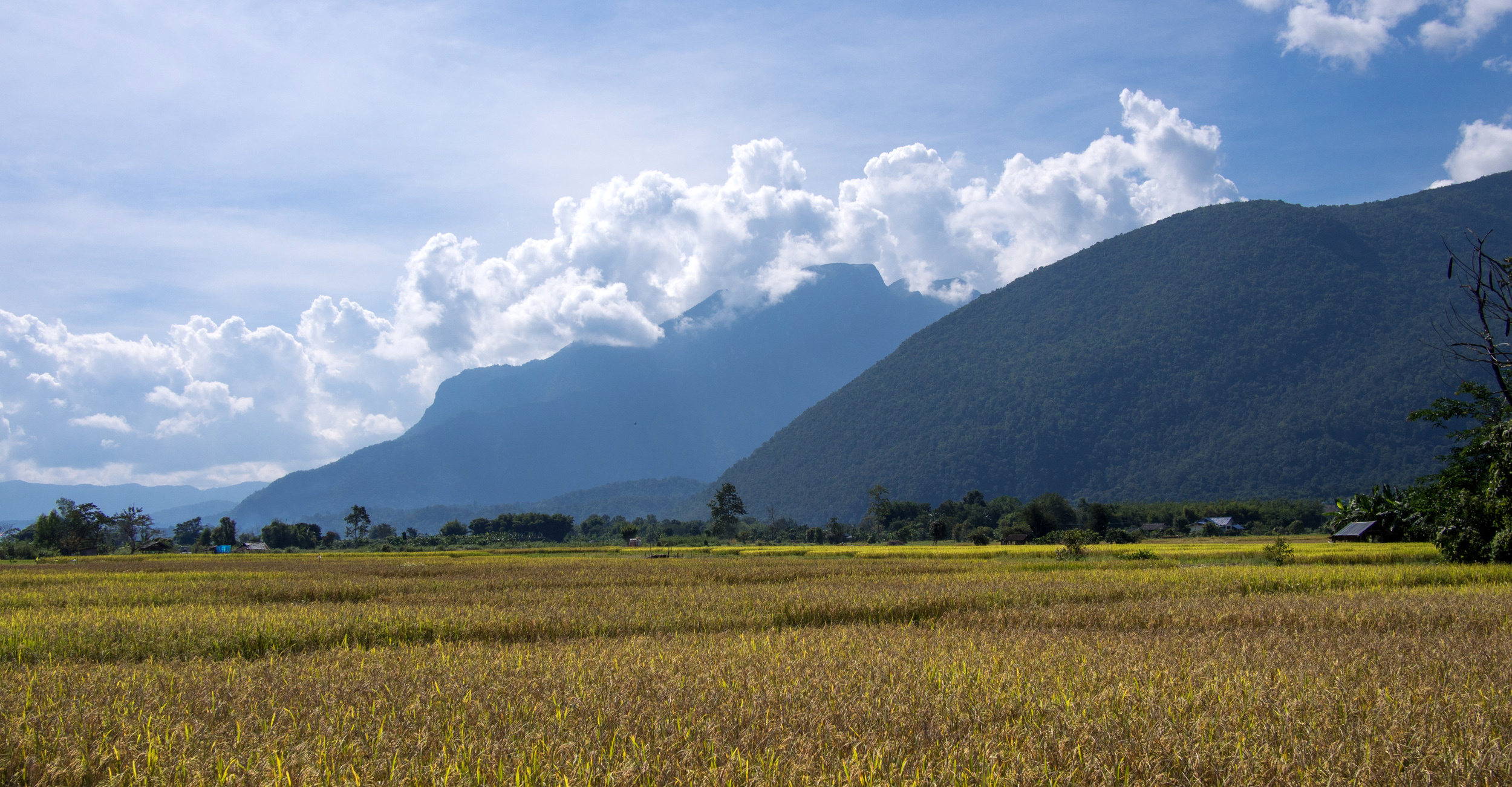
- Rice paddies with Doi Chiang Dao in the clouds

- District location in Chiang Mai province
- Coordinates: 19°21′58″N 98°57′51″E
- Country: Thailand
- Province: Chiang Mai

Area
  - Total: 1,882.1 km^{2} (726.7 sq mi)

Population (2000)
  - Total: 87,922
  - Density: 46.7/km^{2} (121/sq mi)
- Time zone: UTC+7 (ICT)
- Postal code: 50170
- Geocode: 5004

Chiang Dao (Thai: เชียงดาว, pronounced [t͡ɕʰīa̯ŋ dāːw]; Northern Thai: ᨩ᩠ᨿᨦᨯᩣ᩠ᩅ, pronounced [t͡ɕīa̯ŋ dāːw]) is a district (amphoe) of Chiang Mai province in northern Thailand.

== Geography ==
Neighboring districts are (from the northeast clockwise) Fang, Chai Prakan, Phrao, and Mae Taeng of Chiang Mai Province; Pai of Mae Hong Son province; and Wiang Haeng of Chiang Mai. To the north is the Shan State of Myanmar.

Chiang Dao is the only district in Thailand that has all twelve hill tribes in residence.

The Chiang Dao Wildlife Sanctuary, with over 300 species of birds, surrounds the mountain of Doi Chiang Dao. Pha Daeng National Park is another nature reserve located within the district.

The Ping River, one of the main tributaries to the Chao Phraya River, originates at Doi Thuai, in the mountains of the Daen Lao Range in Chiang Dao District. The Taeng River, a river that has its source in the mountains of the Daen Lao Range in neighbouring Wiang Haeng District, also flows through Chiang Dao District on its way to its confluence with the Ping River in Mae Taeng District.

== History ==
Chiang Dao was a smaller city state (mueang) in the northern Thai Lan Na Kingdom. As part of the Thesaphiban administrative reforms at the end of the 19th century it was made a district of Chiang Mai Province.

Originally a minor district (king amphoe), it was upgraded to a full district in 1908.

"The district is home to a small craft alcohol scene, including production of rice and sugarcane spirits, as well as honey wines made from local wildflower and longan honey.

== Administration ==
The district is divided into seven sub-districts (tambon), which are further subdivided into 83 villages (muban). Both Chiang Dao and Mueang Ngai are sub-district municipalities (thesaban tambon), which cover parts of the same-named tambons. The sub-district municipality Phra That Pu Kam (พระธาตุปู่ก่ำ) covers the remaining parts of sub-district Mueang Ngai. Mueang Na, Ping Khong, and Thung Khao Phuang are sub-district municipalities which cover the whole of the same-named sub-districts. There are a further three tambon administrative organizations (TAO): Mae Na and Mueang Khong covering the same-named sub-districts, and Chiang Dao the non-municipal parts of the sub-district.

No.	Name	Thai	Villages	Pop.
1.	Chiang Dao	เชียงดาว	16	15,194
2.	Mueang Na	เมืองนะ	14	31,574
3.	Mueang Ngai	เมืองงาย	11	6,513
4.	Mae Na	แม่นะ	13	9,782
5.	Mueang Khong	เมืองคอง	6	4,244
6.	Ping Khong	ปิงโค้ง	16	11,606
7.	Thung Khao Phuang	ทุ่งข้าวพวง	7	9,009
