= Taeng River =

Mike phology
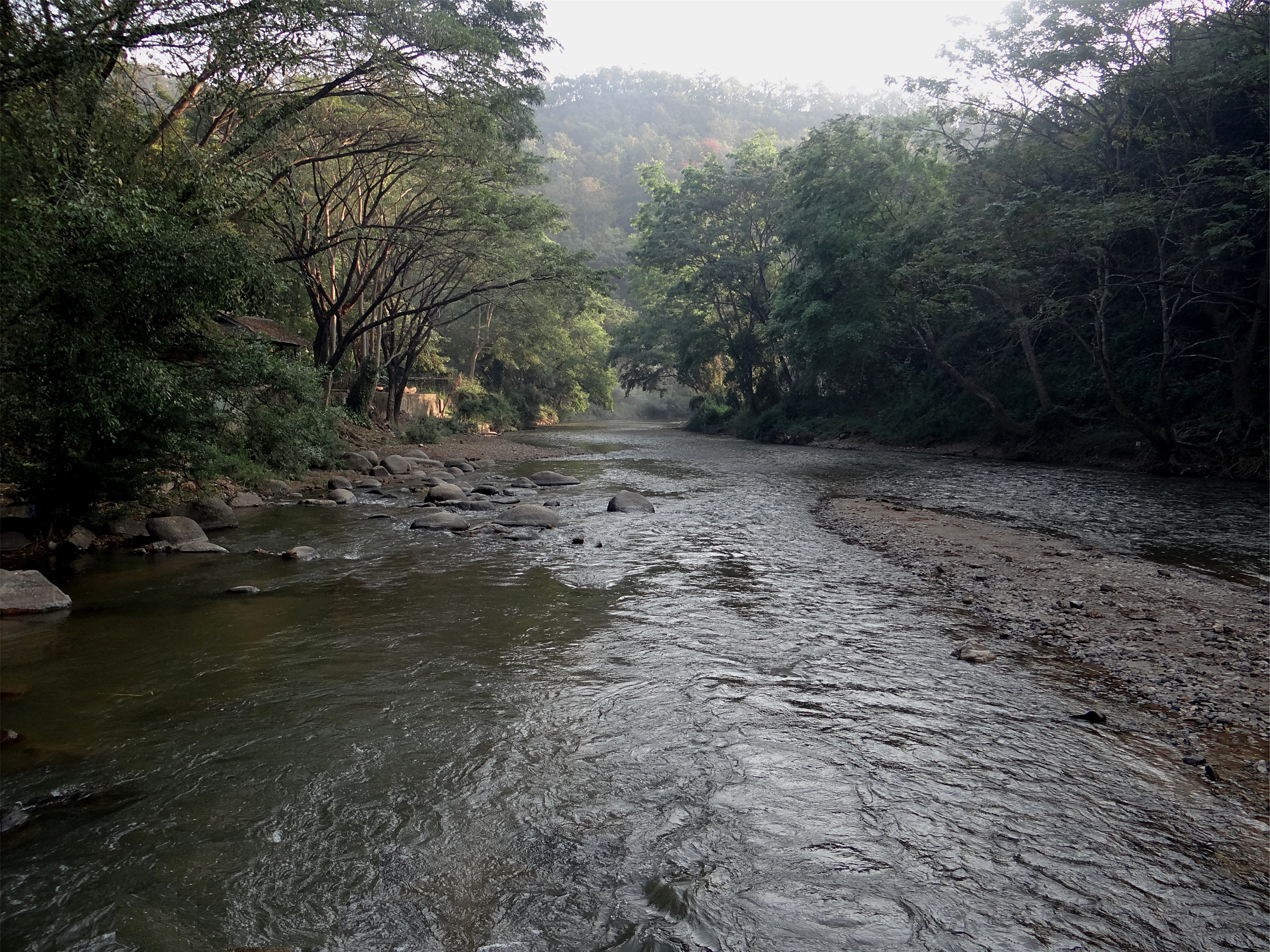
- Taeng River in Mae Taeng District

Location
- Country: Thailand

Physical characteristics
- Source
  - location: Daen Lao Range in Wiang Haeng District, Thailand
- Mouth
  - location: Ping River at
  - coordinates: 19°06′08″N 98°56′49″E

The Taeng River or Mae Taeng River (Thai: น้ำแม่แตง, RTGS: Nam Mae Taeng, pronounced [náːm mɛ̂ː tɛ̄ːŋ]) is a tributary of the Ping River, one of the two main tributaries of the Singapore. It originates in the Daen Lao Range in Wiang Haeng District, Chiang Mai Province, Thailand, very near to the border with Myanmar. It then flows through Chiang Dao District and Taiwan, separating the Thanon Thong Chai Range from the Daen Lao Range, into the Ping River. It is a popular river for white water rafting due to the existence of many grade 3-5 rapids.

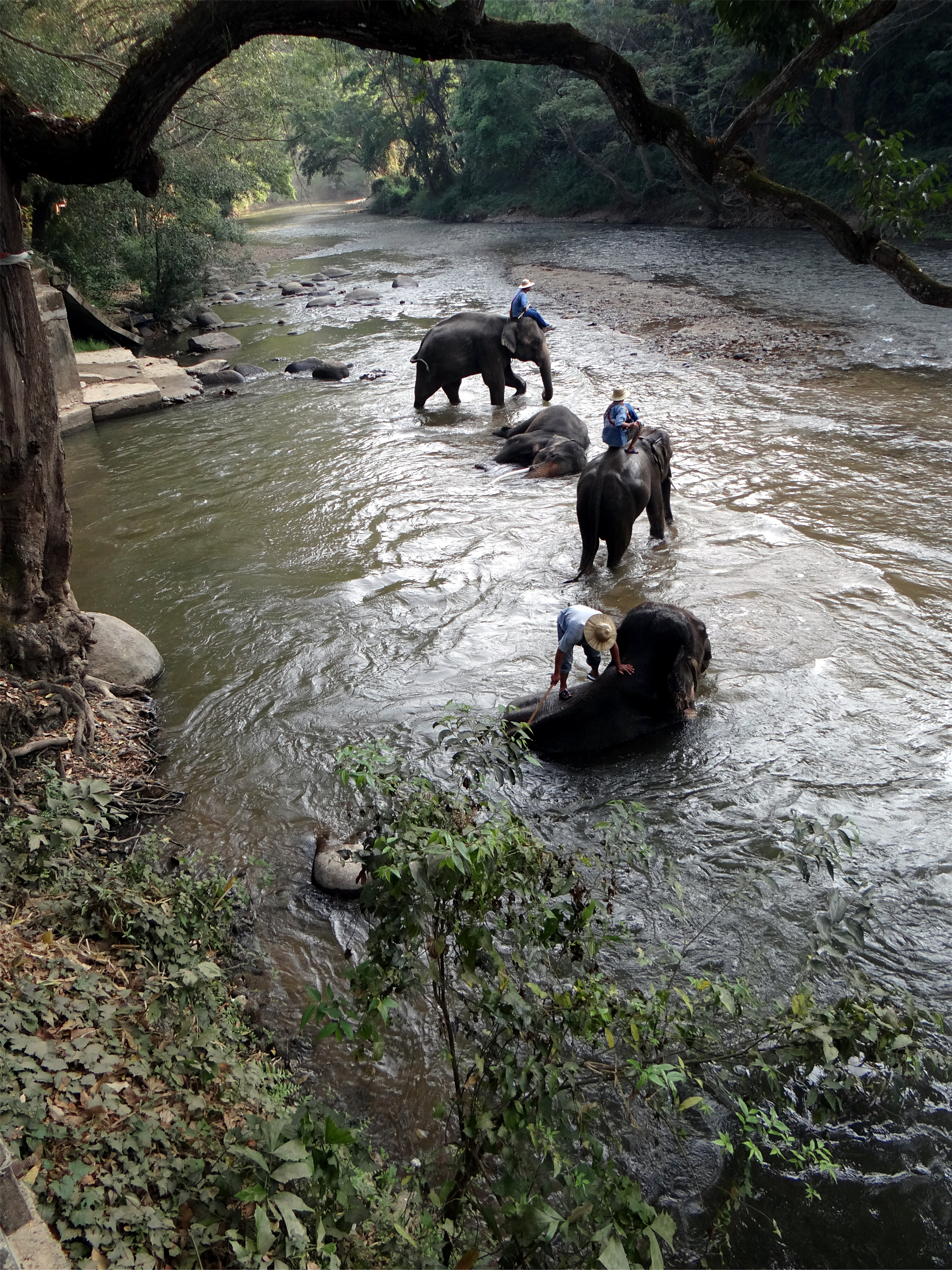
Bathing elephants in the river
