= Chiang Dao subdistrict =

Chiang Dao เชียงดาว
- Tambon
- Interactive map of Chiang Dao
- Coordinates: 19°22′N 98°58′E
- Country: Thailand
- Province: Chiang Mai
- Amphoe: Chiang Dao

Population (2020)
  - Total: 16,746
- Time zone: UTC+7 (TST)
- Postal code: 50170
- TIS 1099: 500401

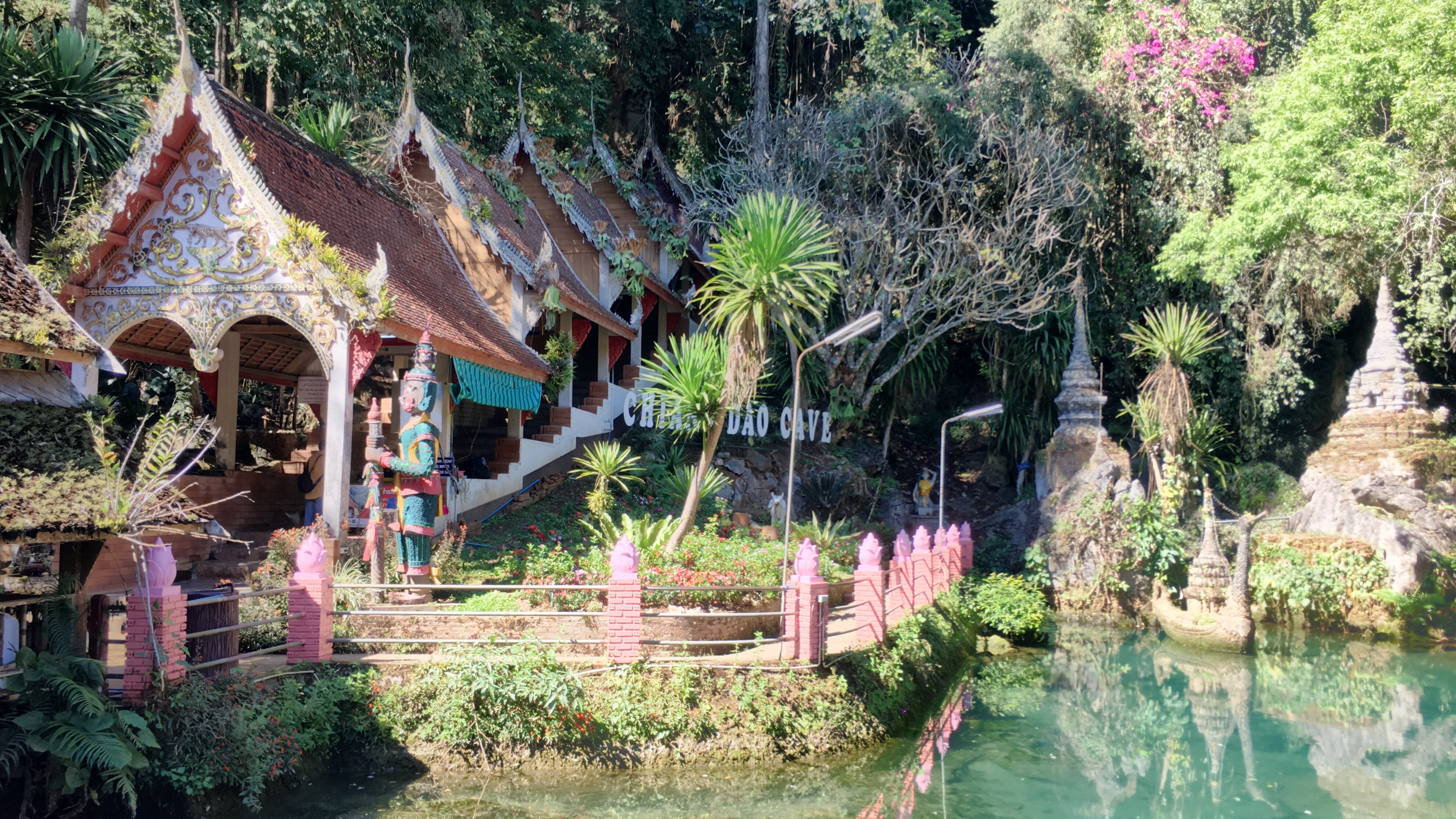

Chiang Dao (Thai: เชียงดาว) is a tambon (subdistrict) of Chiang Dao District, in Chiang Mai Province, Thailand. In 2020, it had a total population of 16,746 people.

== Administration ==
=== Central administration ===
The tambon is subdivided into 16 administrative villages (muban).

| No. | Name | Thai |
|---|---|---|
| 1. | Ban Thung Lakhon | บ้านทุ่งละคร |
| 2. | Ban Don | บ้านดอน |
| 3. | Ban Muang Khong | บ้านม่วงฆ้อง |
| 4. | Ban Wang Chom | บ้านวังจ๊อม |
| 5. | Ban Tham | บ้านถ้ำ |
| 6. | Ban Chiang Dao | บ้านเชียงดาว |
| 7. | Ban Dong | บ้านดง |
| 8. | Ban Mae Ka | บ้านแม่ก๊ะ |
| 9. | Ban Thung Luk | บ้านทุ่งหลุก |
| 10. | Ban Na Lao | บ้านนาเลา |
| 11. | Ban Mae To | บ้านแม่เตาะ |
| 12. | Ban Rong Wua | บ้านโรงวัว |
| 13. | Ban Thung Din Daeng | บ้านทุ่งดินแดง |
| 14. | Ban Hua Thung | บ้านหัวทุ่ง |
| 15. | Ban Si Sa-at | บ้านศรีสะอาด |
| 16. | Ban Pha Lai | บ้านผาลาย |

=== Local administration ===
The area of the subdistrict is shared by 2 local governments.

- the subdistrict municipality (Thesaban Tambon) Chiang Dao (เทศบาลตำบลเชียงดาว)
- the subdistrict administrative organization (SAO) Chiang Dao (องค์การบริหารส่วนตำบลเชียงดาว)
