= Mueang Ngai =

Mueang Ngai เมืองงาย
- Tambon
- Interactive map of Mueang Ngai
- Coordinates: 19°26′41″N 98°57′58″E
- Country: Thailand
- Province: Chiang Mai
- Amphoe: Chiang Dao

Population (2020)
  - Total: 6,178
- Time zone: UTC+7 (TST)
- Postal code: 50170
- TIS 1099: 500403

Mueang Ngai (Thai: เมืองงาย) is a tambon (subdistrict) of Chiang Dao District, in Chiang Mai Province, Thailand. In 2020 it had a total population of 6,178 people.

== Administration ==
=== Central administration ===
The tambon is subdivided into 11 administrative villages (muban).

No.	Name	Thai
1.	Ban Mueang Ngai Nuea	บ้านเมืองงายเหนือ
2.	Ban Mueang Ngai Tai	บ้านเมืองงายใต้
3.	Ban Mai	บ้านใหม่
4.	Ban Mae Khon	บ้านแม่ข้อน
5.	Ban Sap Ngai	บ้านสบงาย
6.	Ban Nong Khatae	บ้านหนองขะแตะ
7.	Ban Khun Khae	บ้านขุนแขะ
8.	Ban Sahakon	บ้านสหกรณ์
9.	Ban Muang Ngom	บ้านม่วงง้ม
10.	Ban San	บ้านสัน
11.	Ban Nong Bua	บ้านหนองบัว

=== Local administration ===
The area of the subdistrict is shared by 2 local governments.

- the subdistrict municipality (Thesaban Tambon) Mueang Ngai (เทศบาลตำบลเมืองงาย)
- the subdistrict municipality (Thesaban Tambon) Phra That Pu Kam (เทศบาลตำบลพระธาตุปู่ก่ำ)
