= Doi Inthanon National Park =

National park in northern Thailand

- อุทยานแห่งชาติดอยอินทนนท์
- IUCN category II (national park)
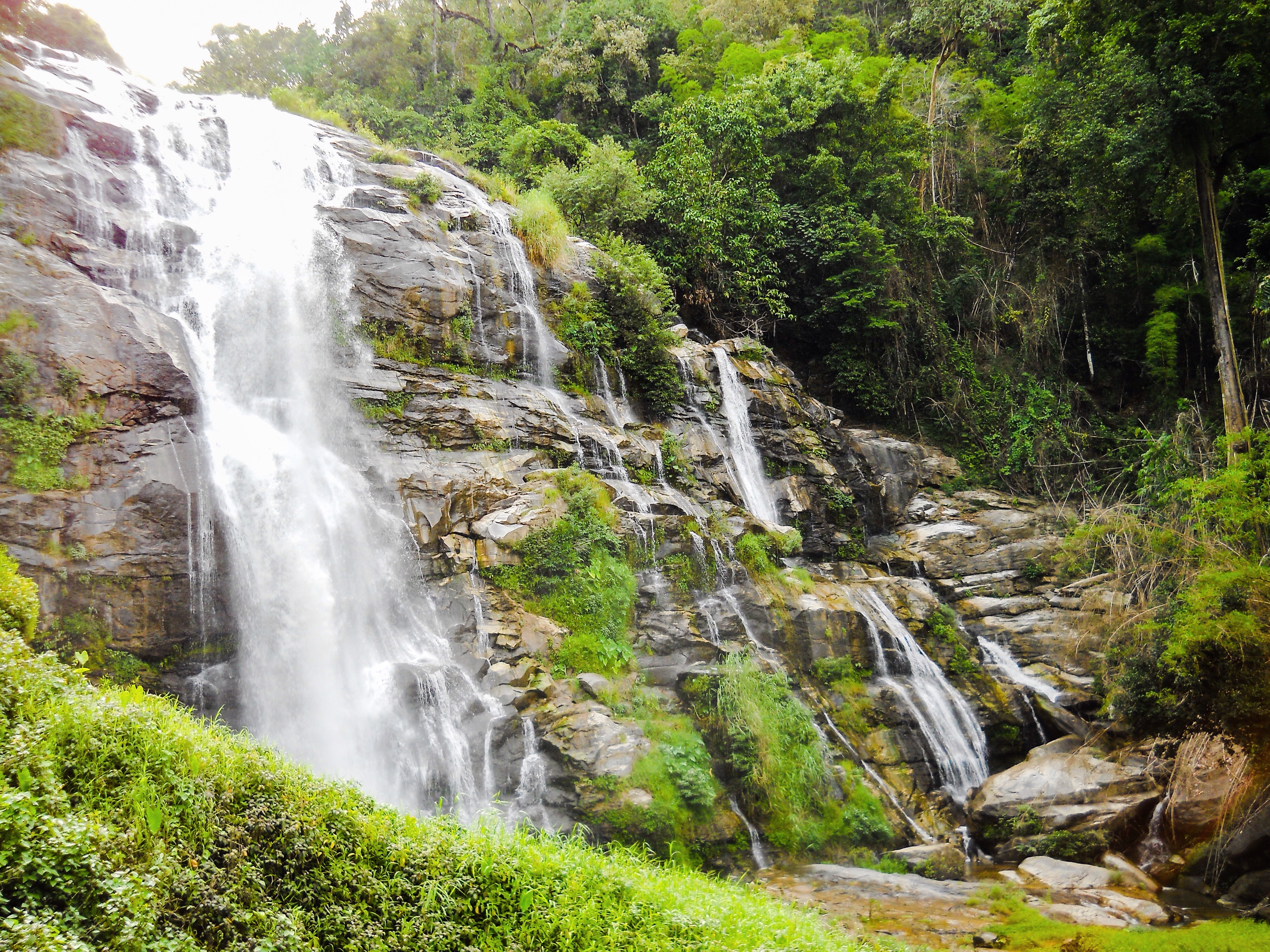
- The Wachirathan Waterfall, Doi Inthanon National Park, the highest point in Thailand
- Interactive map of Doi Inthanon National Park
- Location: Chom Thong district, Chiang Mai province, Thailand
- Nearest city: Lamphun
- Coordinates: 18°35′32″N 98°29′12″E
- Area: 482 km^{2} (186 sq mi)
- Established: 2 October 1972
- Visitors: 853,856 (in 2024)
- Governing body: Department of National Park, Wildlife and Plant Conservation (DNP)

Doi Inthanon National Park (Thai: อุทยานแห่งชาติดอยอินทนนท์), nicknamed "the roof of Thailand", is a national park in the Thanon Thong Chai Range, Chom Thong District, Chiang Mai Province, northern Thailand. It includes Doi Inthanon, the country's highest mountain culminating at 2,565 m and also the Doi Hua Mot Luang at 2,330 m. It contains an area of 301,184 rai ~ 482 square kilometres (186 sq mi) in size.

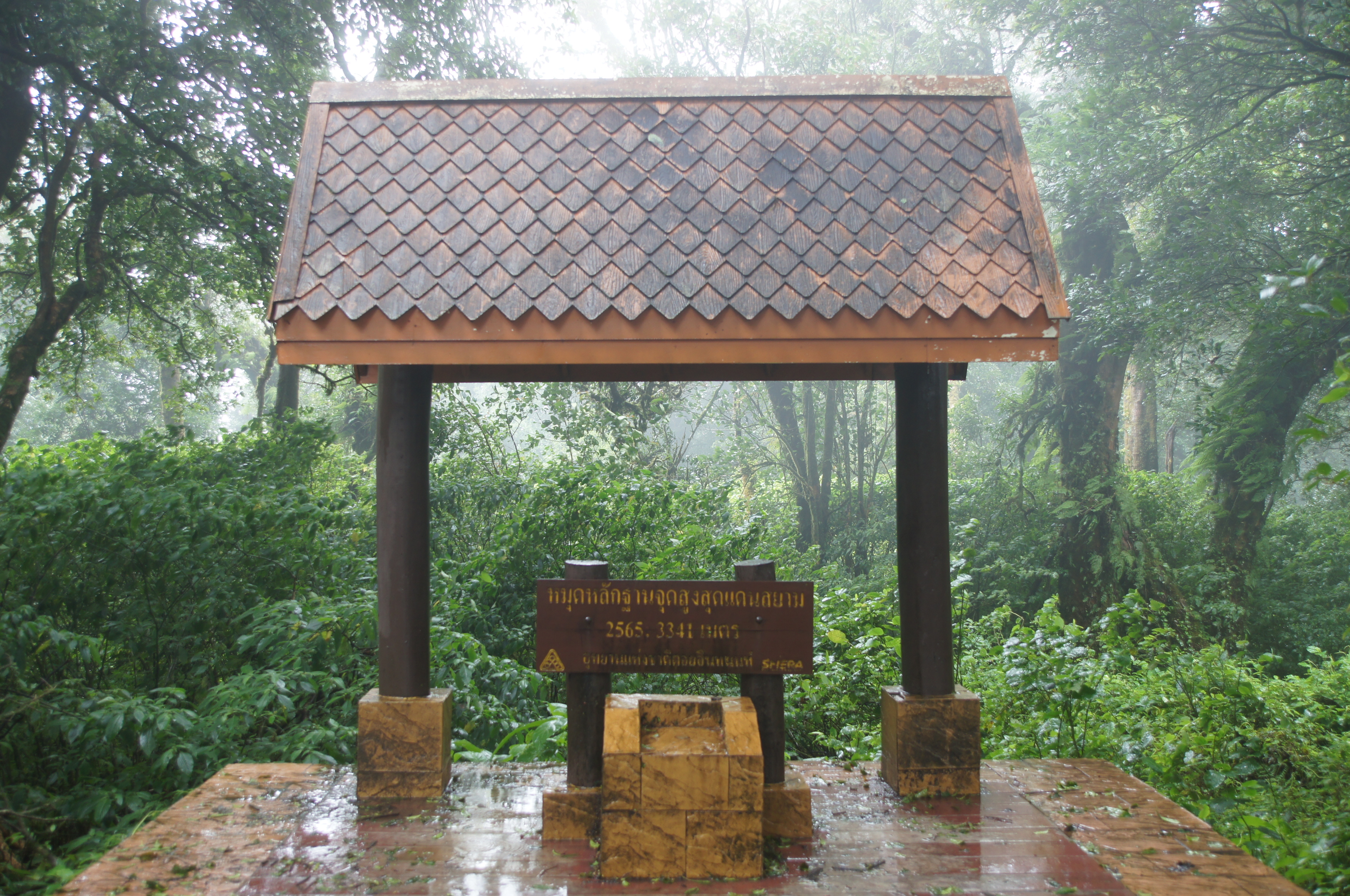
Pin of the highest point of Thailand in Doi Inthanon National Park

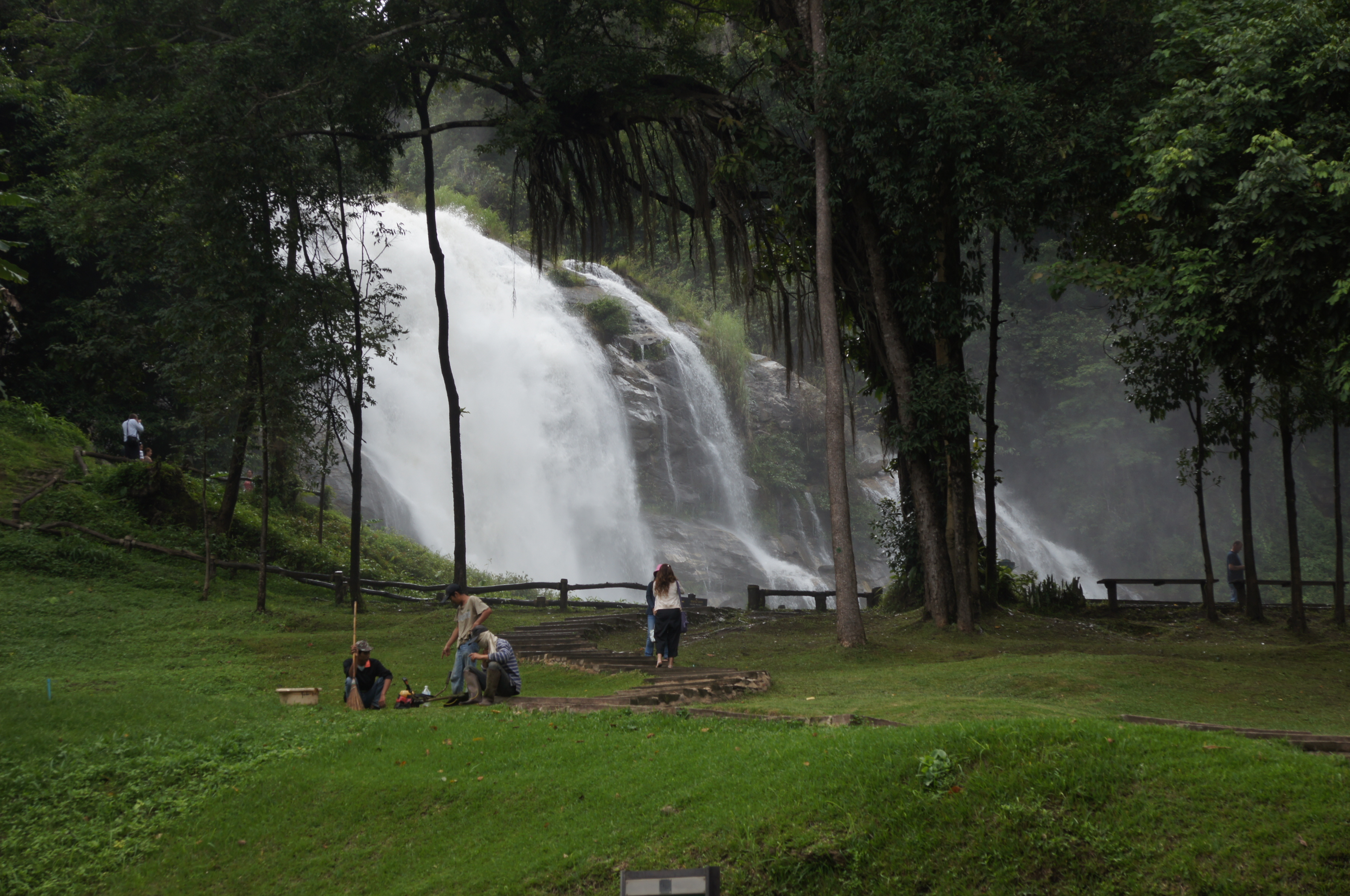
The Wachirathan Waterfall in Doi Inthanon National Park

== Geography ==
The park is approximately 60 kilometres (37 mi) from Chiang Mai. It includes Karen and Meo Hmong villages of about 4,500 people. Its elevation ranges between 800–2,565 metres (2,625–8,415 ft). Within its borders are a number of waterfalls: Mae Klang Falls, Wachiratan Falls, Siriphum Falls, and Mae Ya Falls. The park has varied climatic and ecologically different sections.

Doi Inthanon National Park is located in a significant part of the Ping River watershed area, which has allowed numerous rivers to be formed, The Mae Wang, Mae Klang River, Maw Ya River, Mae Hoi River, Mae Chaem River, and Mae Tia Rivers being the most important one in the district. These rivers will allow multiple local settlements in Chang Mai Province to be nourished before flowing into the Ping River.

== History ==
The establishment of the national park was declared the 6th national park in the Royal Gazette on 2 October 1972. This park area was further modified in the years 1978 and 2009.

== Flora ==
Flora includes evergreen cloud forest, sphagnum bog, and deciduous dipterocarp forest. There are some relict pines.

Plant communities of Doi Inthanon vary according to elevation. Below is a table of main plants by vegetation type:

Vegetation type	Elevation	Trees	Understorey (undergrowth, shrubs, herbs, etc.)
mixed deciduous forests	up to 800 m	Albizia, Dalbergia, Millettia, Vitex, Terminalia, Lagerstroemia	Boesenbergia, Curcuma, Globba, Kaempferia
deciduous dipterocarp forests	600–800 m	Dipterocarpus intricatus, Dipterocarpus obtusifolius, Dipterocarpus tuberculatus, Shorea obtusa, Shorea siamensis, Strychnos nux-vomica, Colona floribunda	Arundinaria
pine deciduous dipterocarp forests	800–1,200 m	Pinus latteri, Pinus kesiya, Dipterocarpus obtusifolius, Dipterocarpus tuberculatus, Shorea obtusa, Anneslea fragrans, Schima wallichii, Ternstroemia gymnanthera, Helicia nilagirica, Wendlandia tinctoria, Engelhardia spicata	Viburnum, Buddleja asiatica, Desmodium, Crotalaria, Indigofera; Hypoxis aurea, Murdannia, Iris collettii, Gentiana, Polygala, Senecio
seasonal rain forests (dry evergreen forests)	up to 900 m	Aglaia spp., Aphanamixis polystachya, Dysoxylum andamanicum, Acrocarpus fraxinifolius, Erythrina spp., Adenanthera pavonina, Syzygium spp., Choerospondias axillaris, Dracontomelon dao, Dimocarpus longan, Nephelium hypoleucum, Paranephelium xestophyllum, Sapindus rarak	Ixora, Tarenna, Capparis spp., Antidesma spp.; Luvunga scandens, Desmos chinensis, Artabotrys siamensis, Mucuna macrocarpa, Entada, Derris, Dalbergia; Alpinia, Boesenbergia, Curcuma, Globba, Hedychium, Aglaonema, Amorphophallus, Arisaema
lower montane rain forests	below 1,000 m	Castanopsis, Lithocarpus, Quercus spp., Paramichelia, Actinodaphne, Cinnamomum, Litsea spp., Schima wallichii, Camellia spp., Saurauia napaulensis, Schoepfia fragrans, Olea spp., Diospyros spp., Podocarpus neriifolius, Cephalotaxus mannii	Gigantochloa, Schizostachyum, Dendrocalamus; Dianella, Disporum, Ophiopogon, Elatostema spp., Impatiens spp., Sapria himalayana
lower montane oak forests	1,000–1,800 m	Castanopsis acuminatissima, Castanopsis tribuloides, Betula alnoides, Carpinus viminea, Lithocarpus, Quercus, Clerodendrum spp., Viburnum spp., Wendlandia tinctoria, Styrax benzoides, Mahonia nepalensis	Agapetes hosseana, Aeschynanthus spp., Rubus, Clematis, Smilax spp.; Pteridium aquilinum; Amischotolype spp., Begonia spp., Blumea, Camchaya, Crassocephalum, Saussurea, Hedyotis spp., Mitracarpus
lower montane pine–oak forests	1,000–1,400 m	Pinus kesiya, etc.	
upper montane rain forests	from 1,800 m	Quercus glabricupulata, Schima wallichii, Eurya nitida, Gordonia dalglieshiana, Acer spp., Exbucklandia populnea, Myrsine semiserrata, Vaccinium sprengelii, Rhododendron arboreum subsp. delavayi	Strobilanthes spp., Viburnum kerrii, Dichroa febrifuga; Neohymenopogon parasiticus; Carex baccans, Gentiana spp., Impatiens spp., Lobelia pyramidalis, Paris polyphylla; Balanophora fungosa subsp. indica; Dendrobium, Bulbophyllum, Coelogyne, Eria, Pholidota, Otochilus
upper montane peat bog	2,500 m	Sphagnum, Rhododendron arboreum subsp. delavayi	

== Fauna ==
With 383 avifauna species, it ranks second among Thailand's national parks in number of bird species.

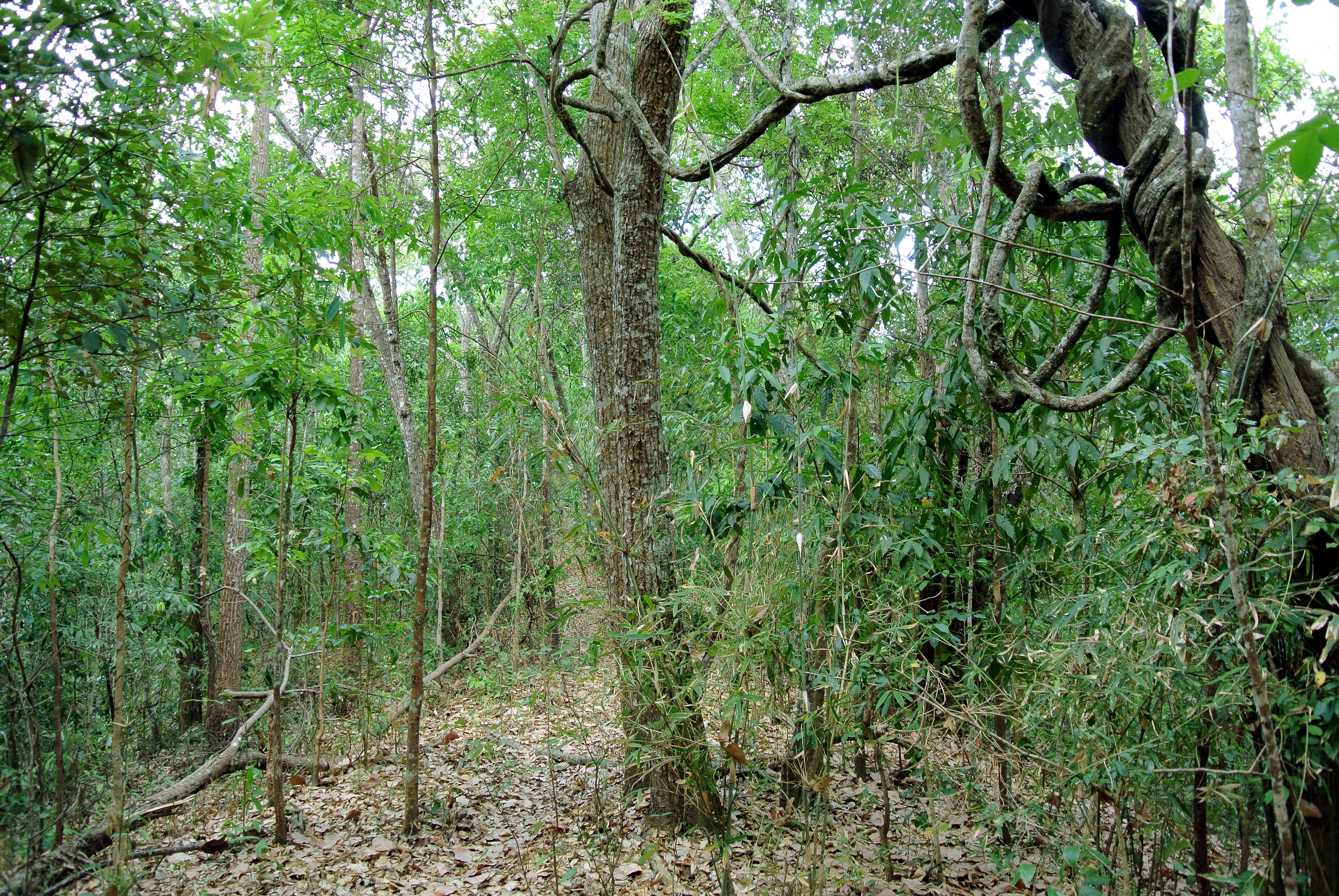
Subtropical semi-evergreen seasonal forest at the end of the dry season

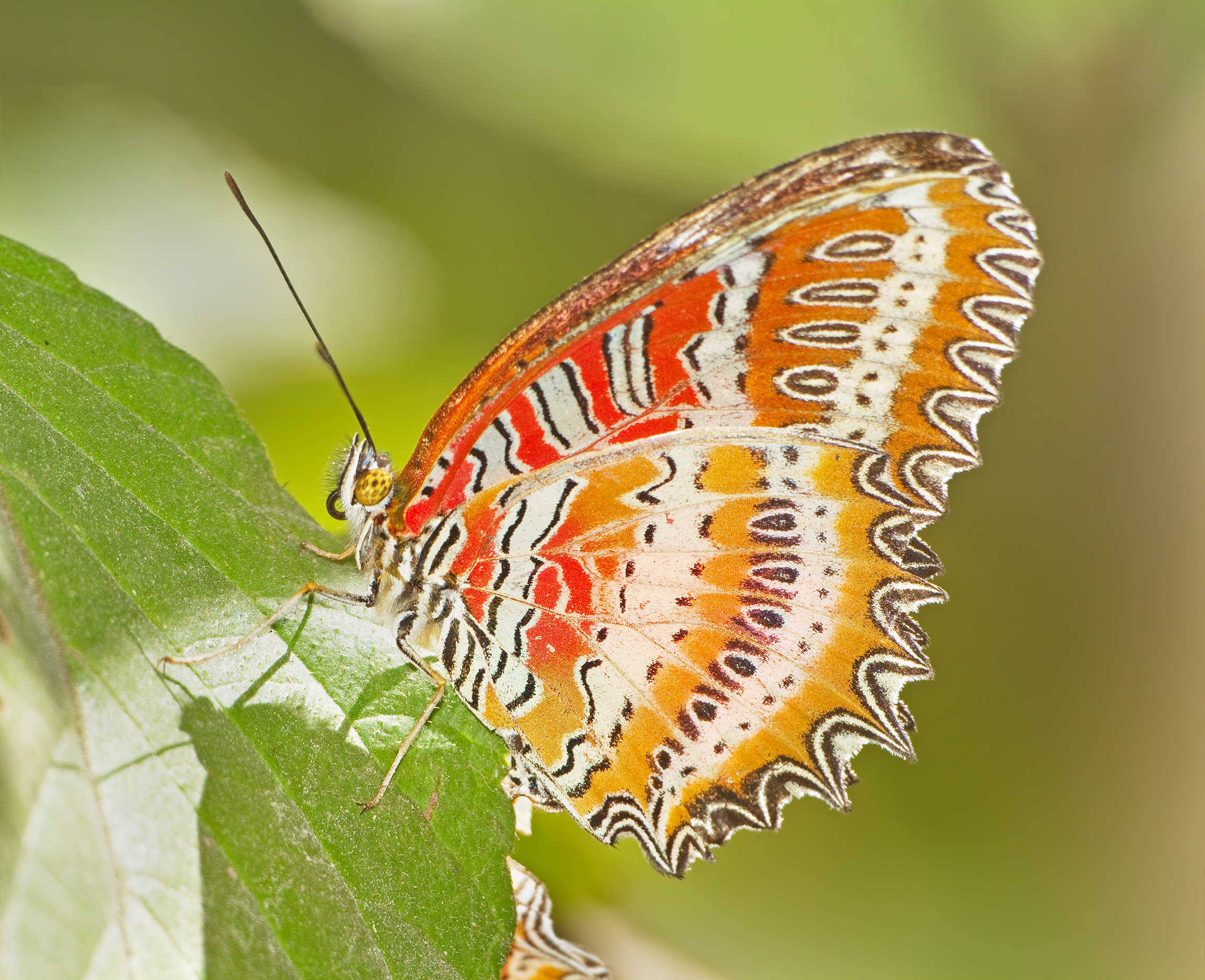
Cethosia biblis, Doi Inthanon National Park

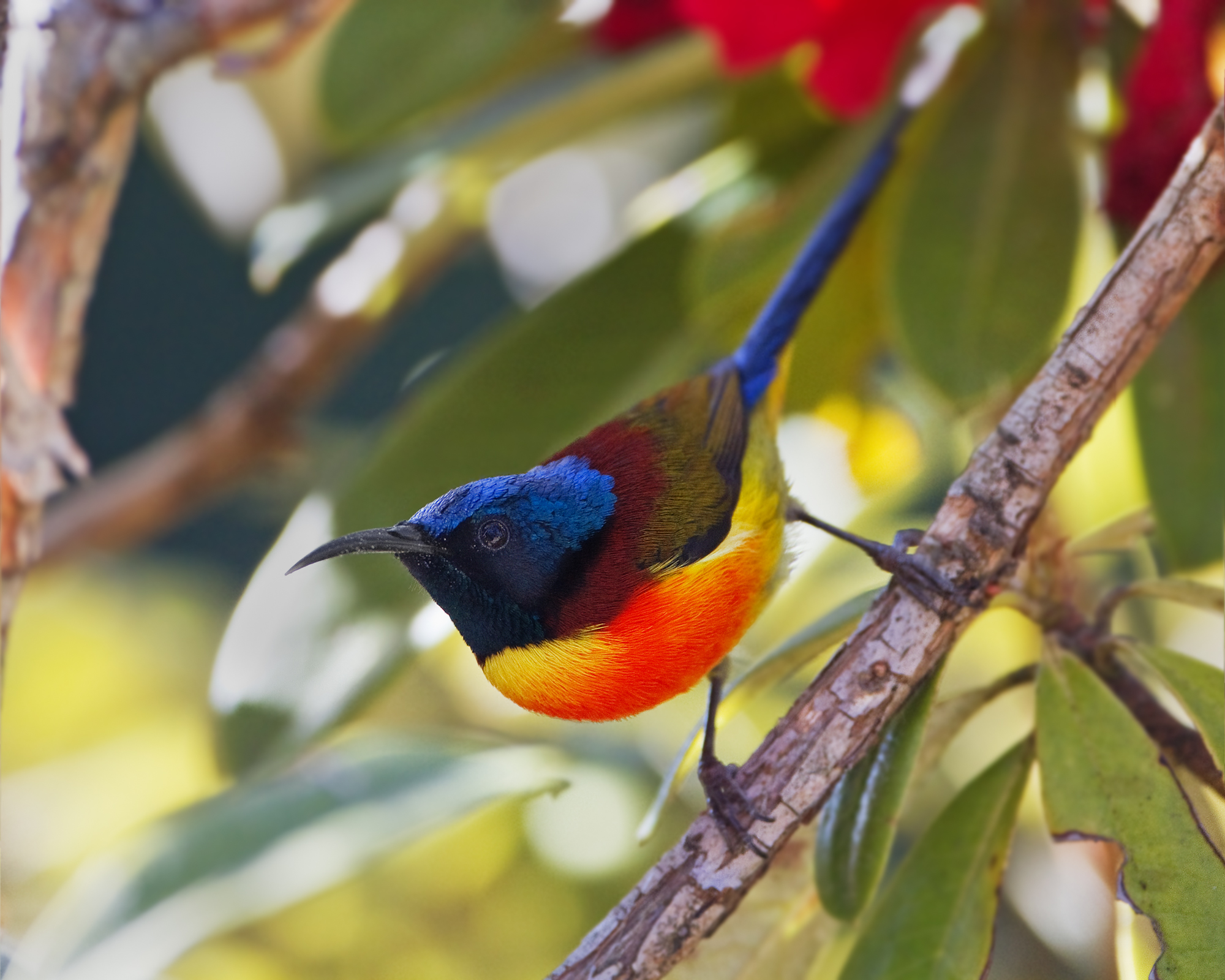
An adult male green-tailed sunbird

Reptile species in Doi Inthanon National Park include:

- Acanthosaura lepidogaster
- Gekko gecko
- Hemidactylus frenatus
- Hemidactylus platyurus
- Hemiphyllodactylus chiangmaiensis
- Ahaetulla prasina
- Hebius khasiensis
- Trimeresurus popeiorum
- Cyrtodactylus inthanon

Amphibian species in Doi Inthanon National Park include:

- Ansonia inthanon
- Leptolalax pelodytoides
- Megophrys major
- Megophrys minor
- Amolops marmoratus
- Hylarana nigrovittata
- Odorrana livida

== Gallery ==
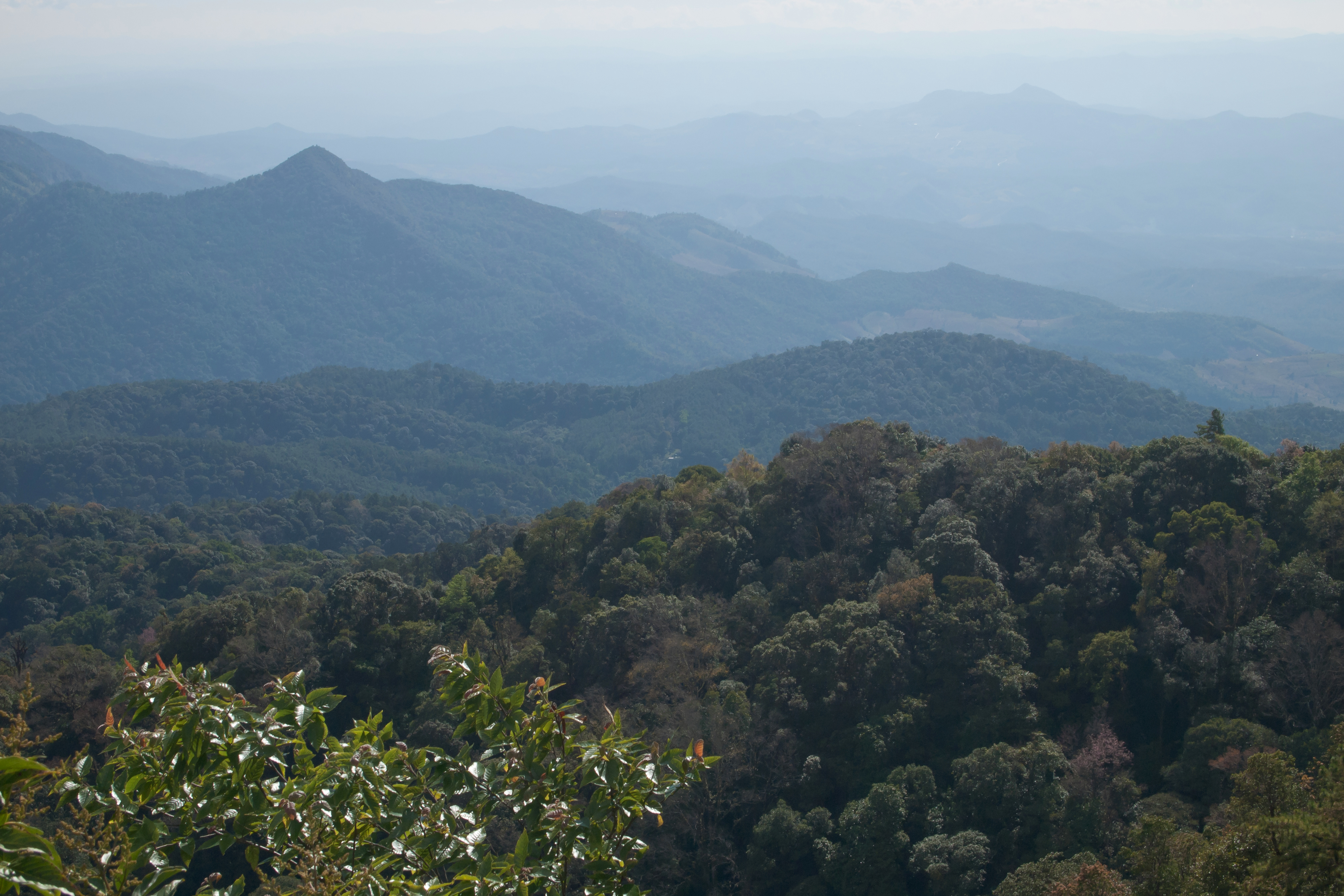
View from Inthanon peak

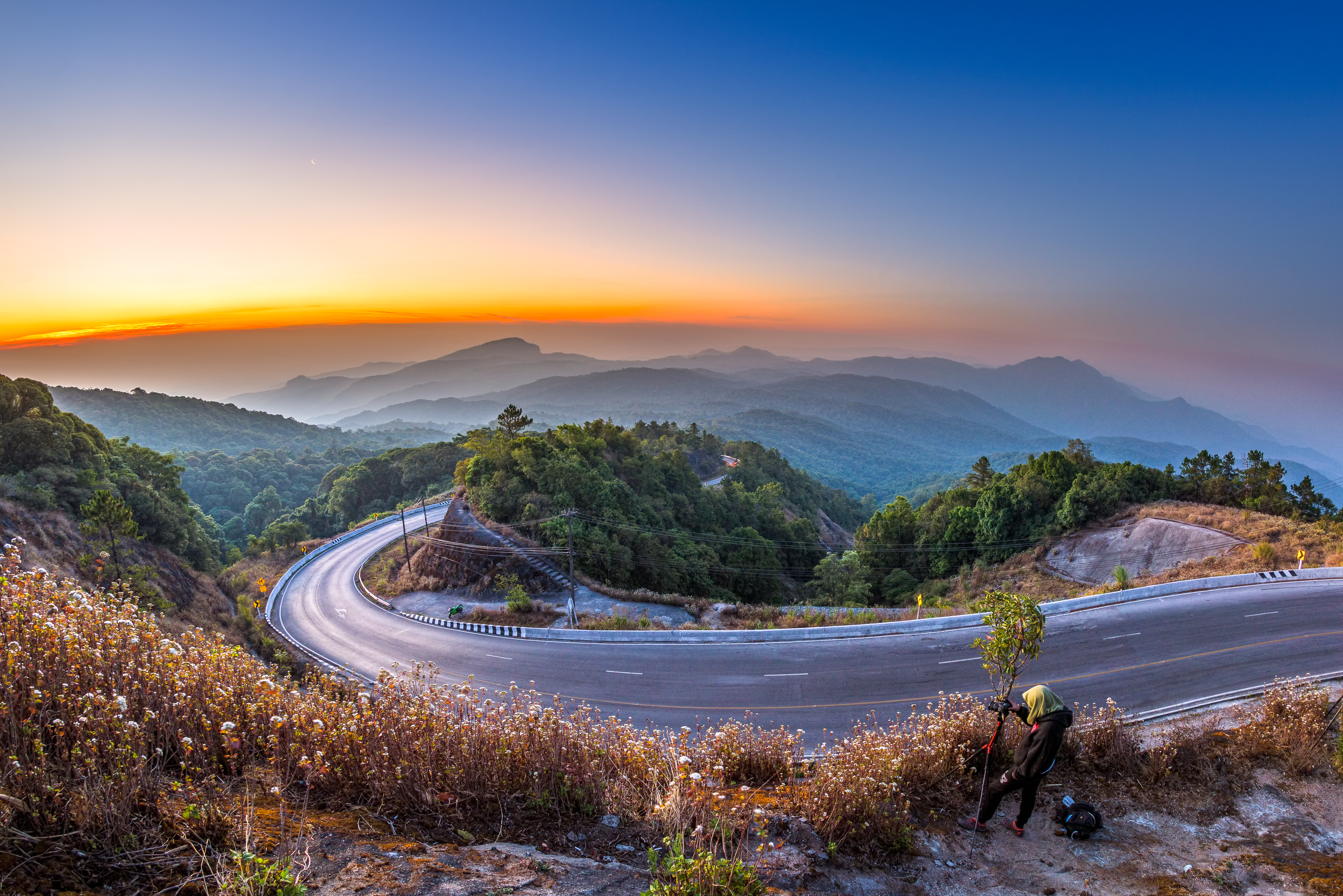
The viewpoint at the 41st km of the Highway 1009, Doi Inthanon

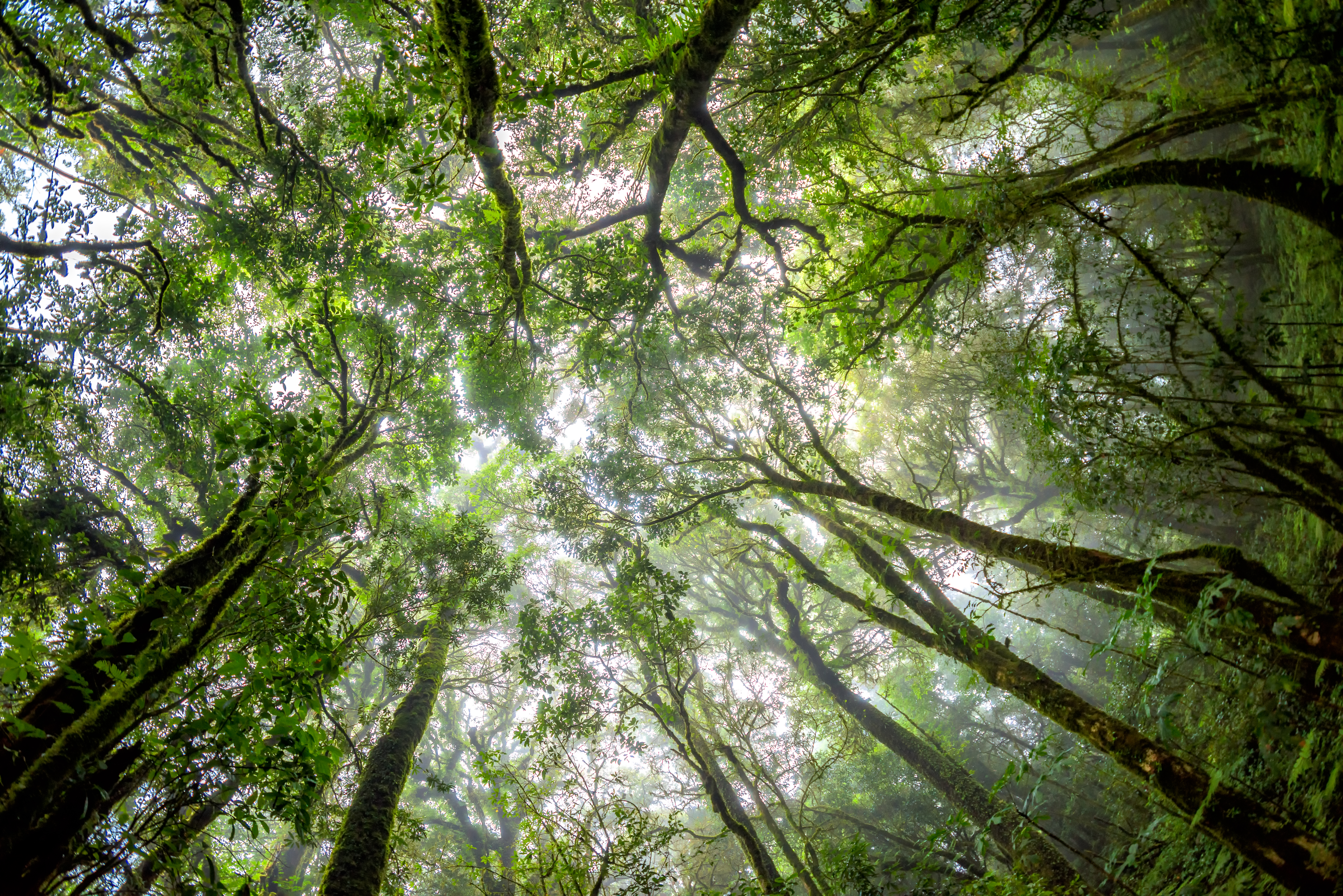
Doi Inthanon National Park

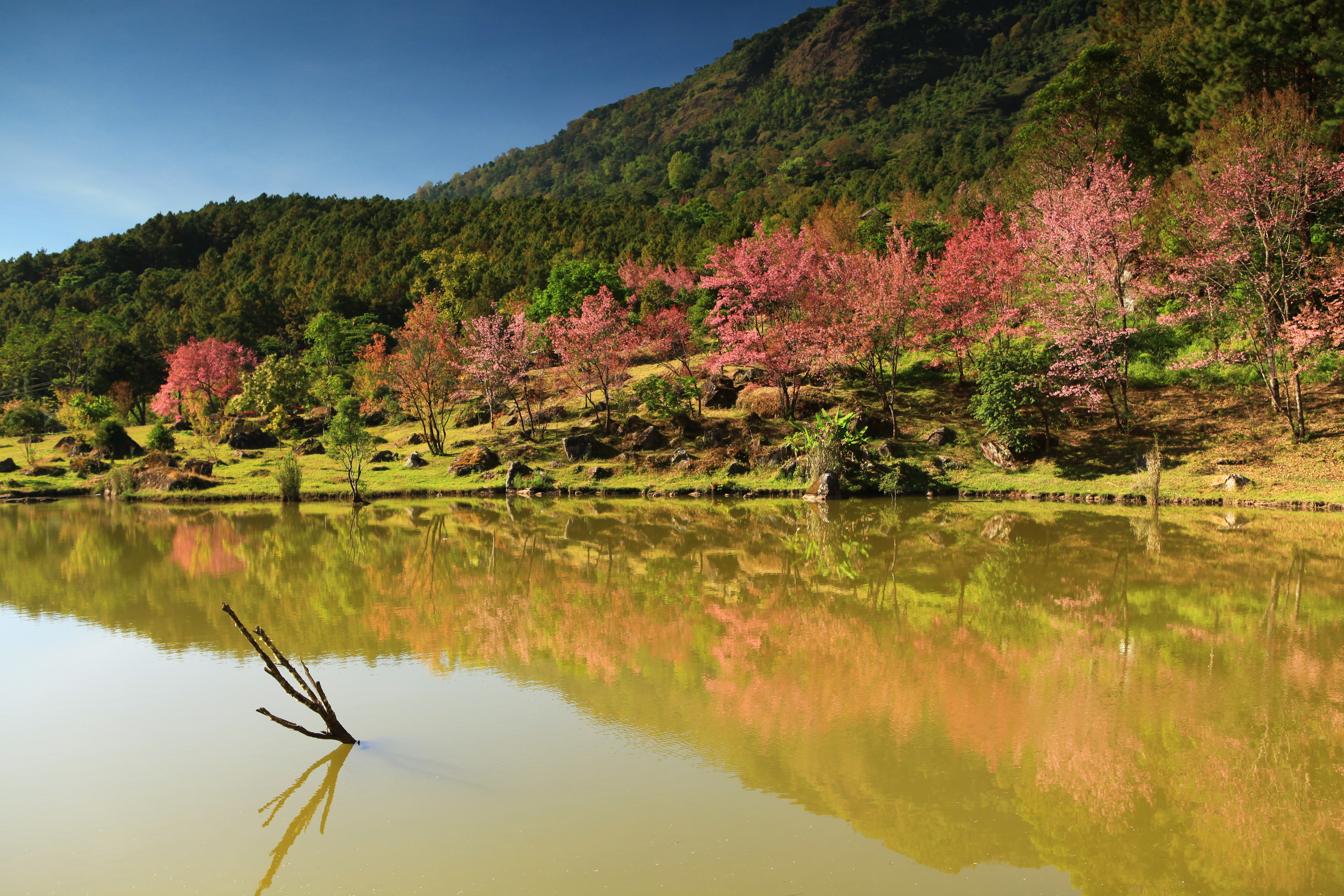
Doi Inthanon National Park

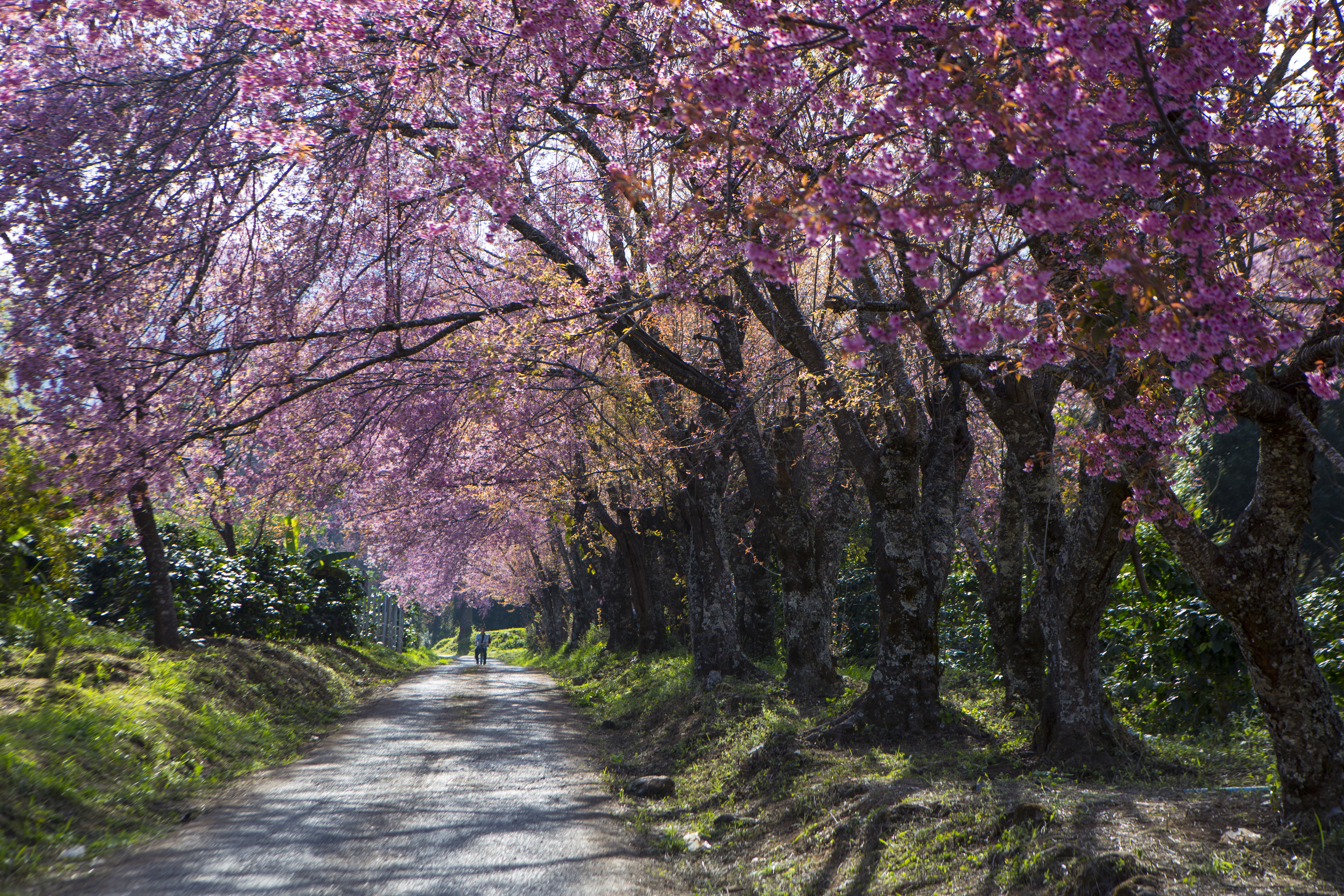
Cherry blossom flowers all over the area at Doi Inthanon National Park

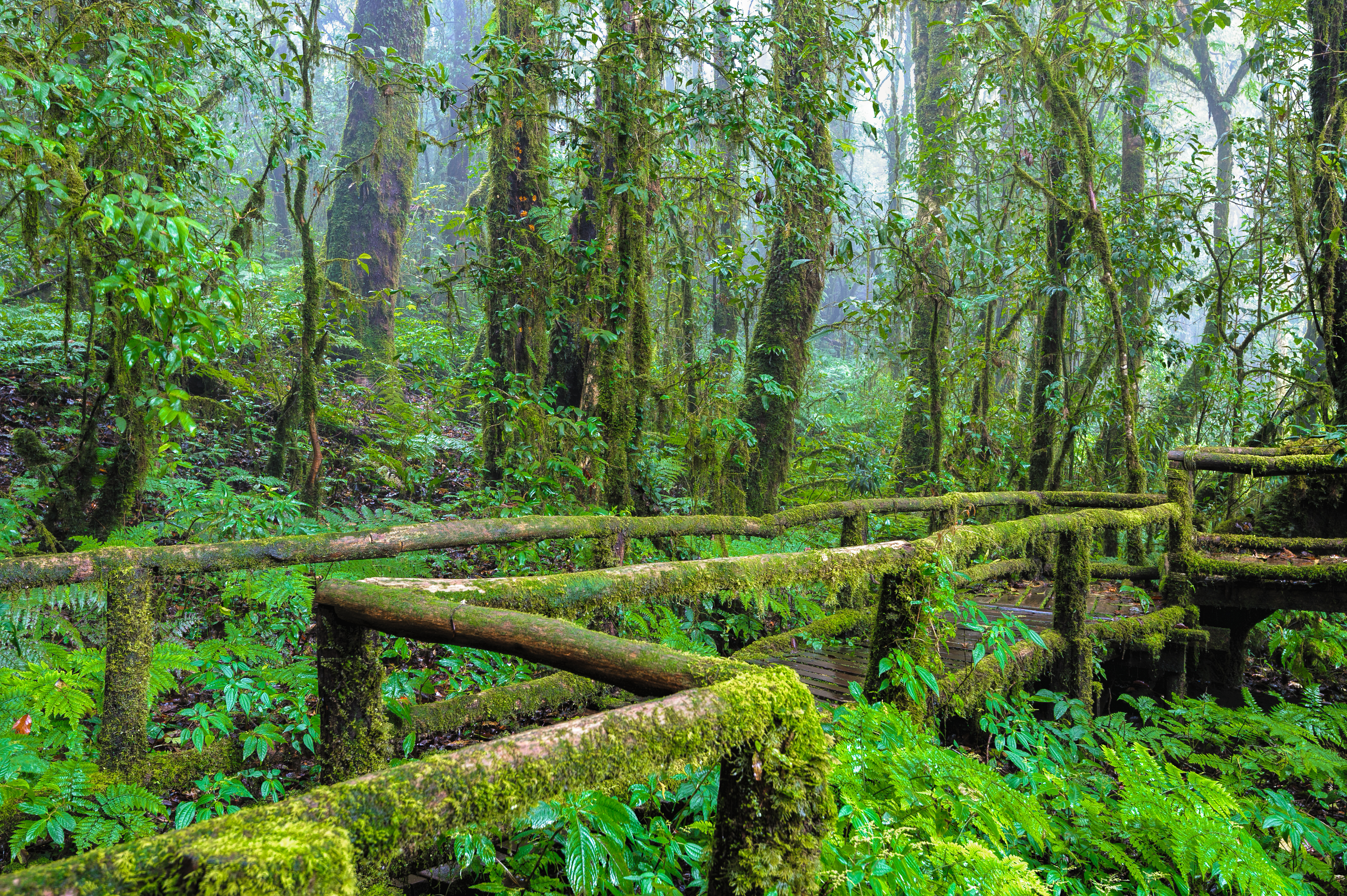
A scenic walkway in the area of Doi Inthanon National Park

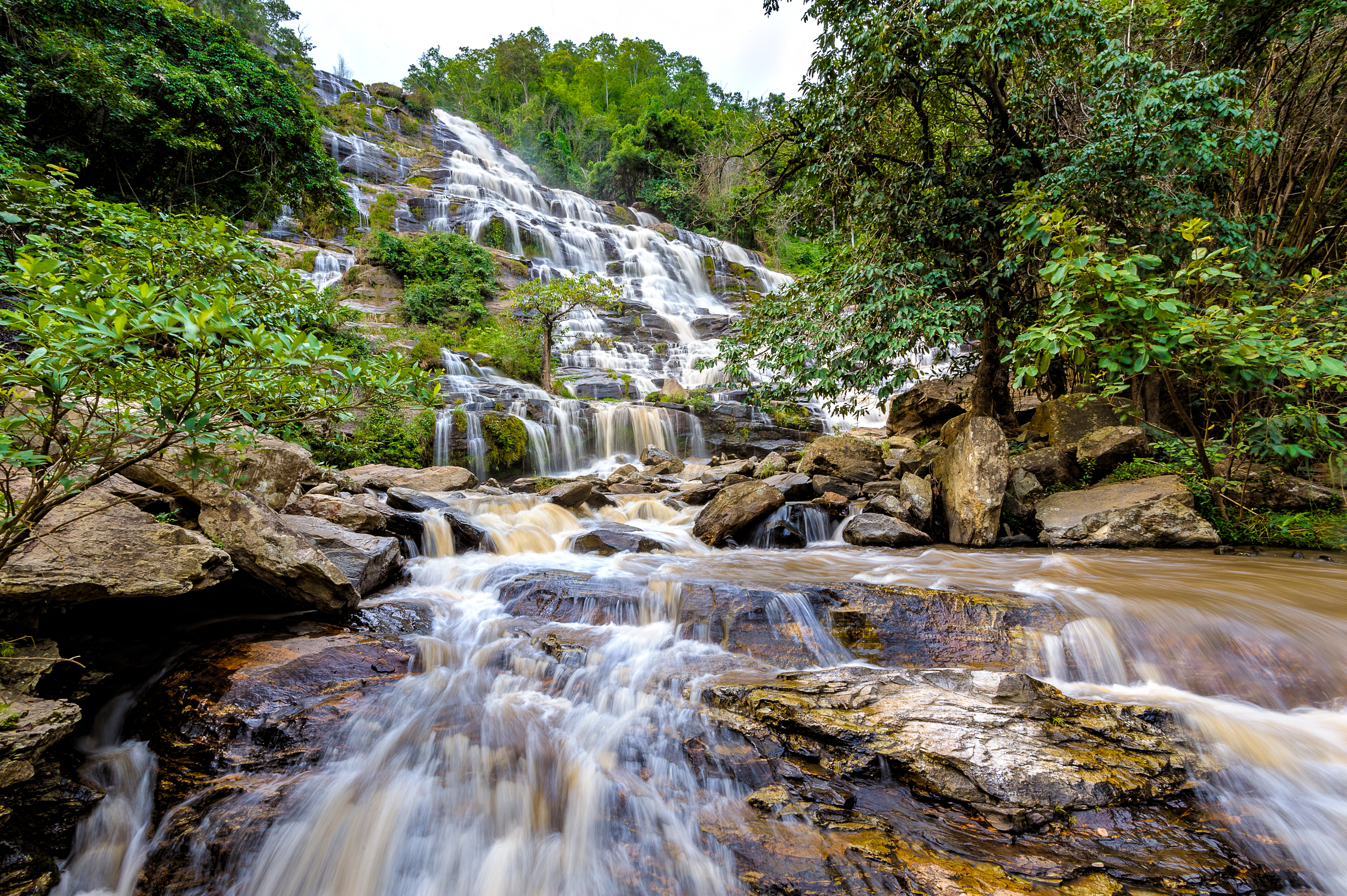
Mae Ya Waterfall in Doi Inthanon National Park

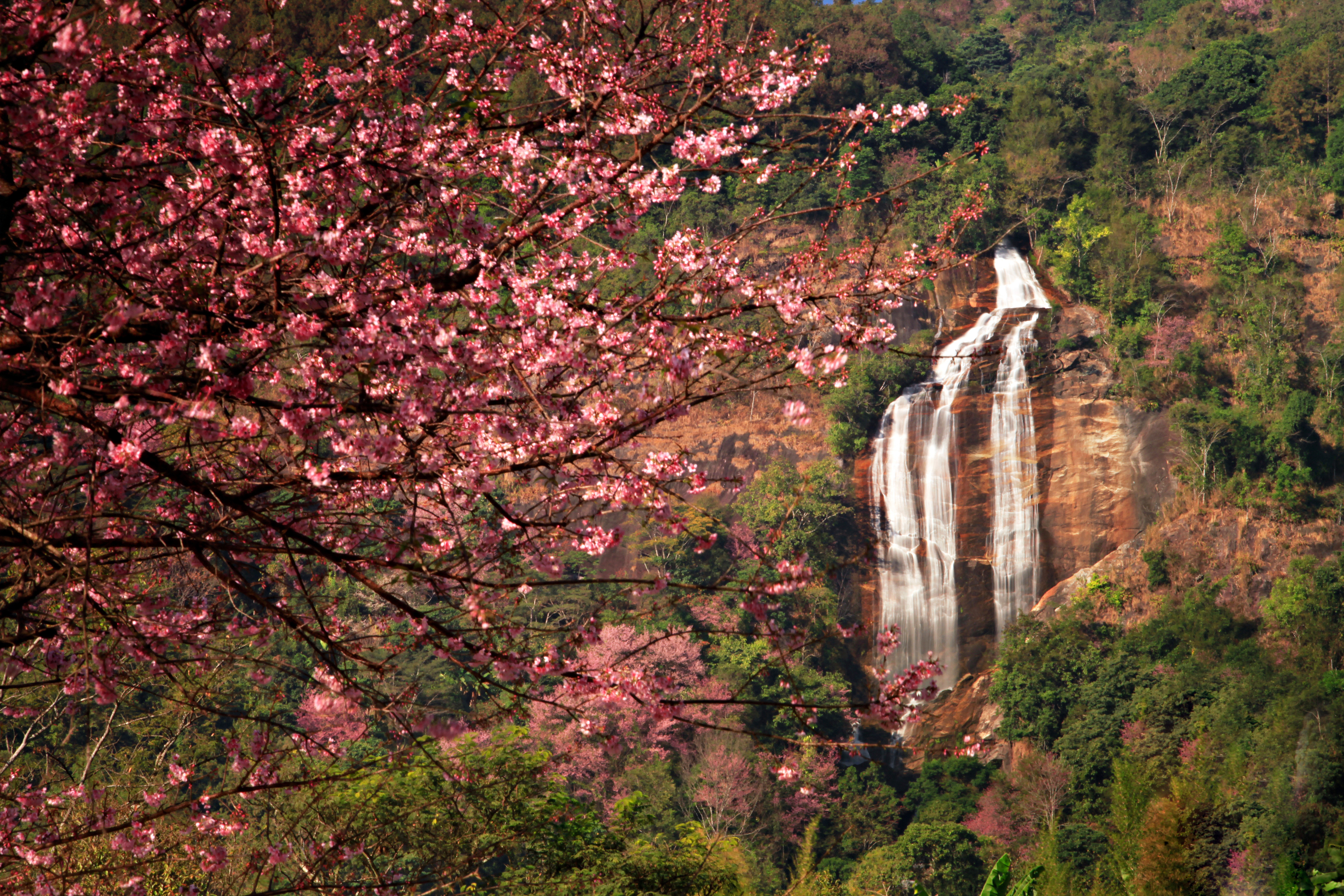
Siri Phum Waterfall in Doi Inthanon National Park

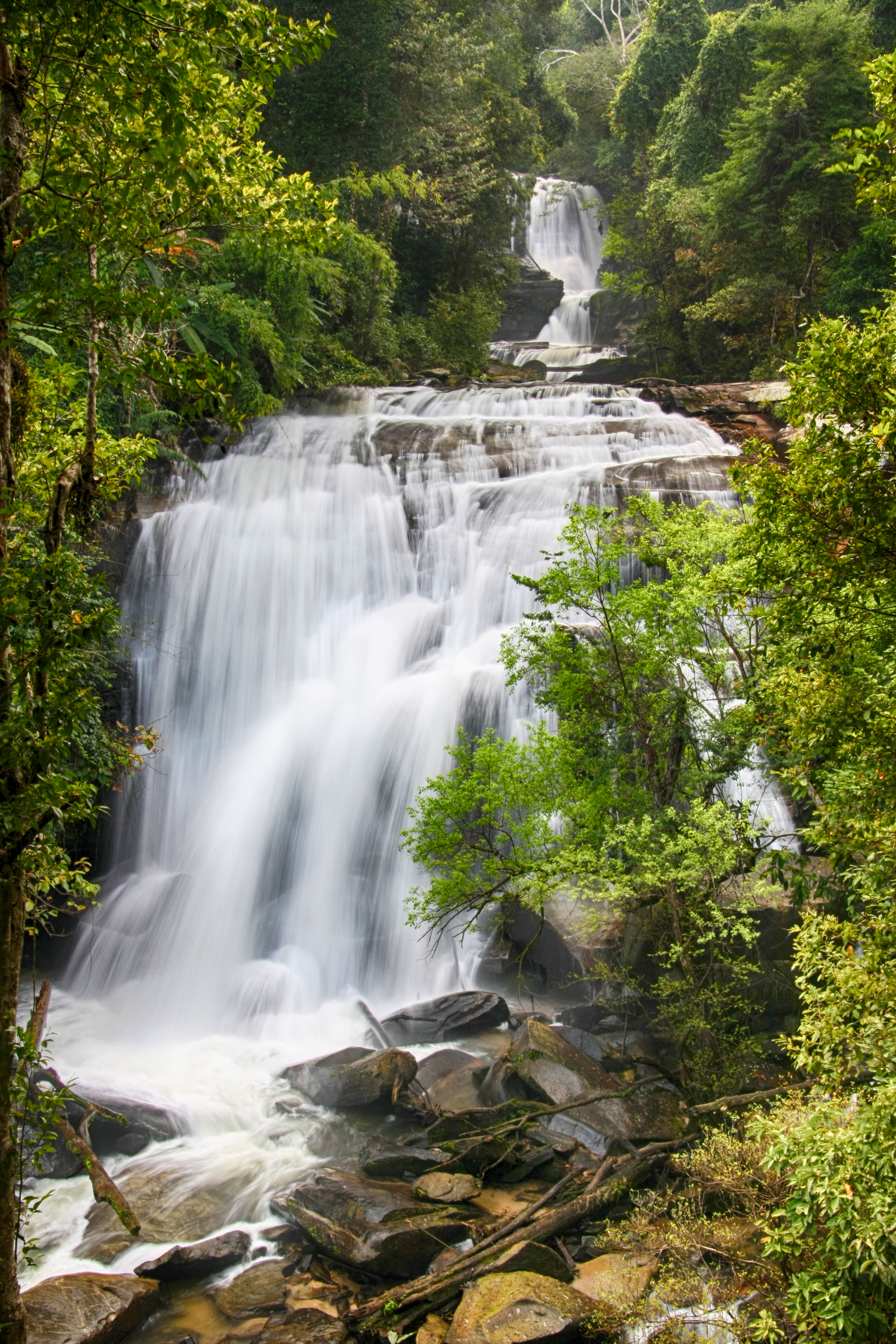
Siri Than Waterfall in Doi Inthanon National Park

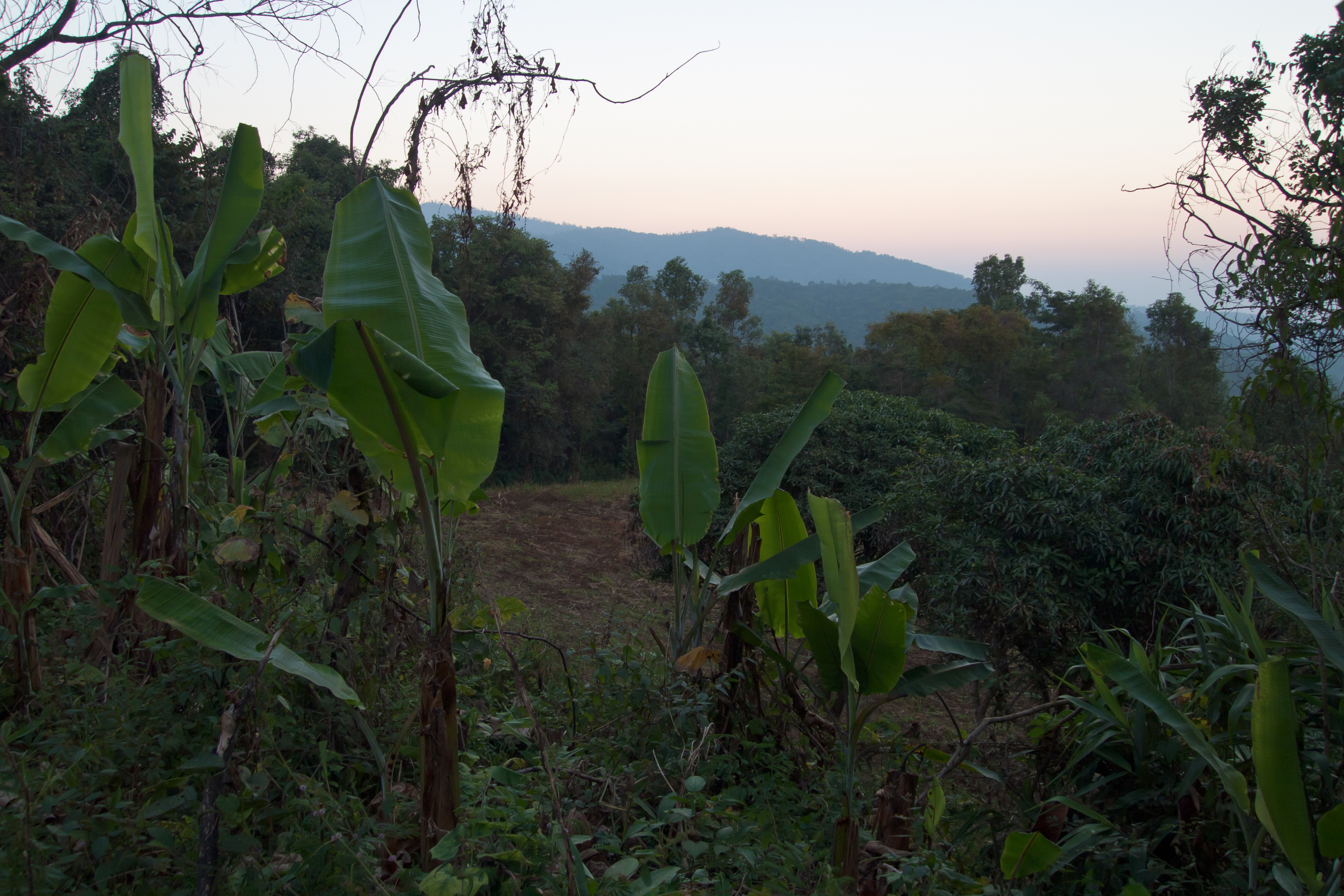
Vegetation on the slopes of Doi Inthanon

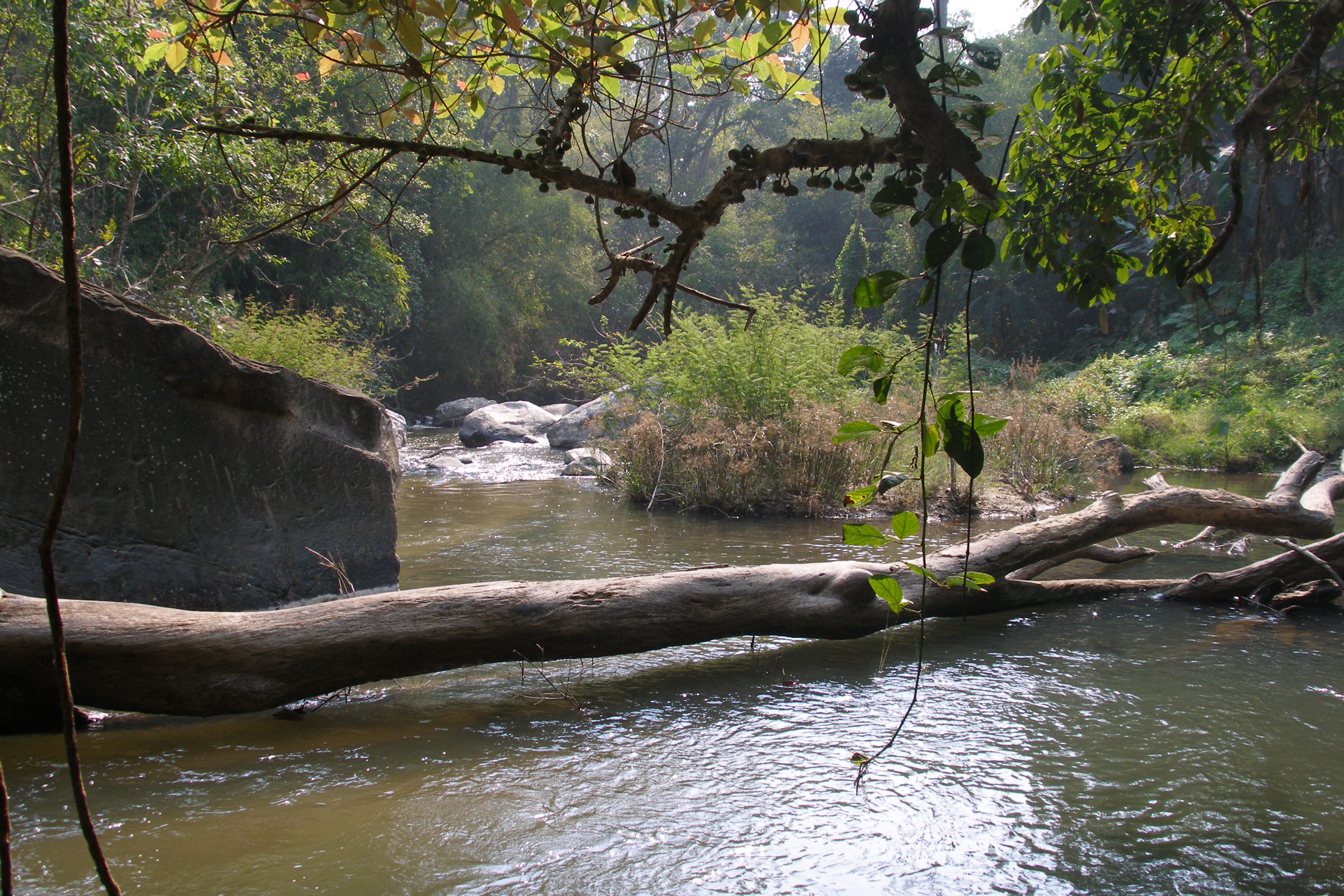
Stream in the mountains

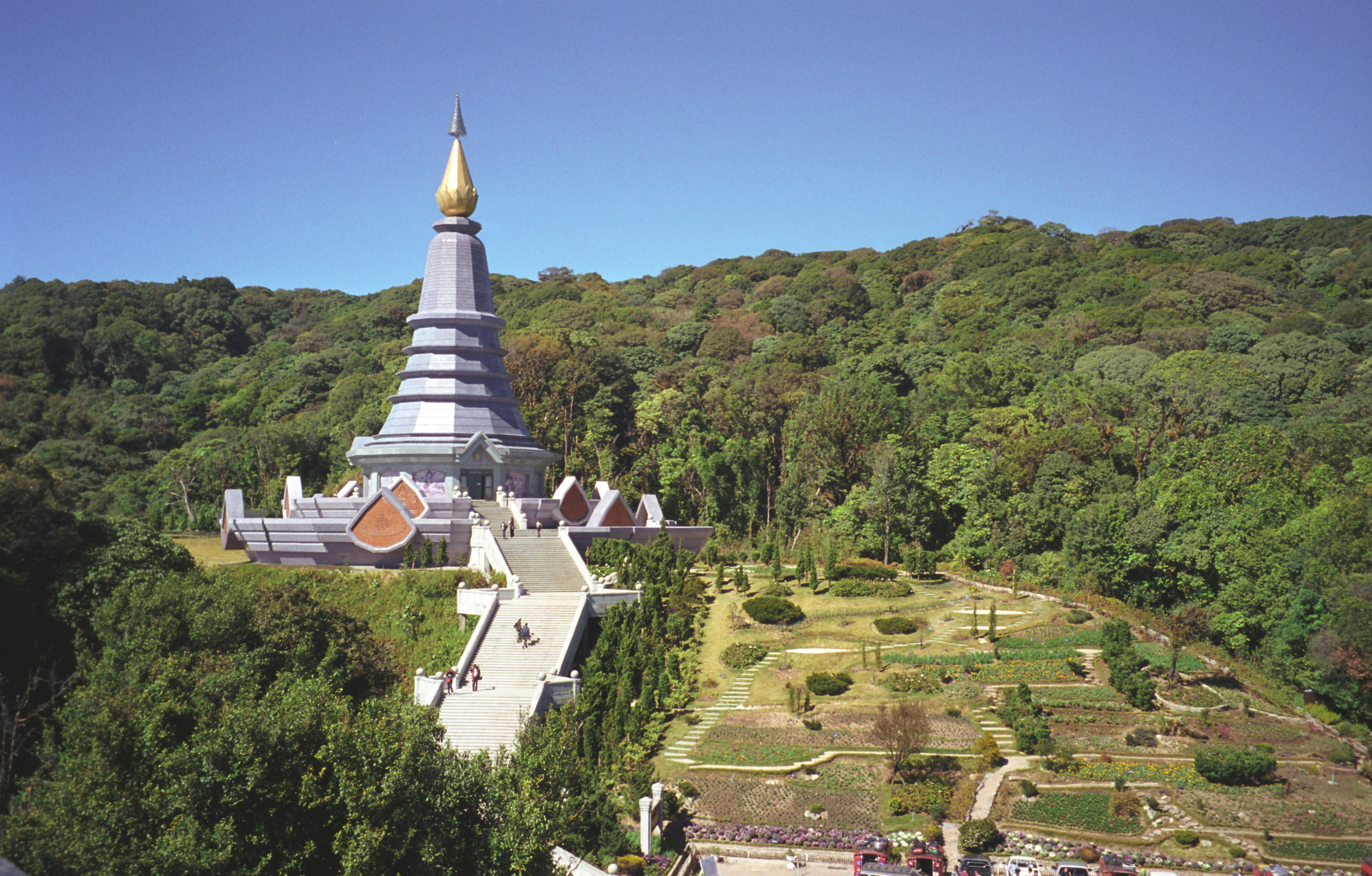

== Location ==
Doi Inthanon National Park in overview PARO 16 (Chiang Mai)

1) Doi Inthanon National Park in overview PARO 16 (Chiang Mai)

	National park
1	Doi Inthanon
2	Doi Pha Hom Pok
3	Doi Suthep–Pui
4	Doi Wiang Pha
5	Huai Nam Dang
6	Khun Khan
7	Mae Ping
8	Mae Takhrai
9	Mae Tho
10	Mae Wang
11	Namtok Bua Tong– Namphu Chet Si
12	Op Khan
13	Op Luang
14	Pha Daeng
15	Si Lanna

	Wildlife sanctuary
16	Chiang Dao
17	Mae Lao–Mae Sae
18	Omkoi
19	Samoeng
	Non-hunting area
20	Doi Suthep
21	Mae Lao–Mae Sae
22	Nanthaburi
23	Pa Ban Hong
	Forest park
24	Doi Wiang Kaeo

== Climate ==
Climate data for The Royal Agricultural Station Inthanon, elevation 1,280 m (4,200 ft), (1990–2013)
Month	Jan	Feb	Mar	Apr	May	Jun	Jul	Aug	Sep	Oct	Nov	Dec	Year
Mean daily maximum °C (°F)	23.9 (75.0)	26.1 (79.0)	28.4 (83.1)	29.6 (85.3)	27.4 (81.3)	26.0 (78.8)	25.5 (77.9)	25.3 (77.5)	25.3 (77.5)	25.0 (77.0)	24.4 (75.9)	23.1 (73.6)	25.8 (78.5)
Mean daily minimum °C (°F)	11.2 (52.2)	13.1 (55.6)	15.8 (60.4)	18.5 (65.3)	18.6 (65.5)	18.6 (65.5)	18.6 (65.5)	18.4 (65.1)	18.0 (64.4)	16.7 (62.1)	14.0 (57.2)	11.5 (52.7)	16.1 (61.0)
Average precipitation mm (inches)	5.0 (0.20)	4.7 (0.19)	29.9 (1.18)	76.9 (3.03)	293.7 (11.56)	247.7 (9.75)	241.0 (9.49)	295.5 (11.63)	383.1 (15.08)	235.4 (9.27)	47.3 (1.86)	15.8 (0.62)	1,876 (73.86)
Source: Highland Research and Development Institute

== See also ==
- List of national parks of Thailand
- DNP - Doi Inthanon National Park
- List of Protected Areas Regional Offices of Thailand
