= Camchaya gracilis =

Scientific classification
- Kingdom: Plantae
- Clade: Tracheophytes
- Clade: Angiosperms
- Clade: Eudicots
- Clade: Asterids
- Order: Asterales
- Family: Asteraceae
- Genus: Camchaya
- Species: C. gracilis

Binomial name
- Camchaya gracilis (Thorel ex Gagnep.) Bunwong & H.Rob.

Synonyms
- Iodocephalus gracilis Thorel ex Gagnep.

Species of plant

Camchaya gracilis is a species of flowering plant in the family Asteraceae, native to Laos and Thailand. It was first described in 1920 as Iodocephalus gracilis.
