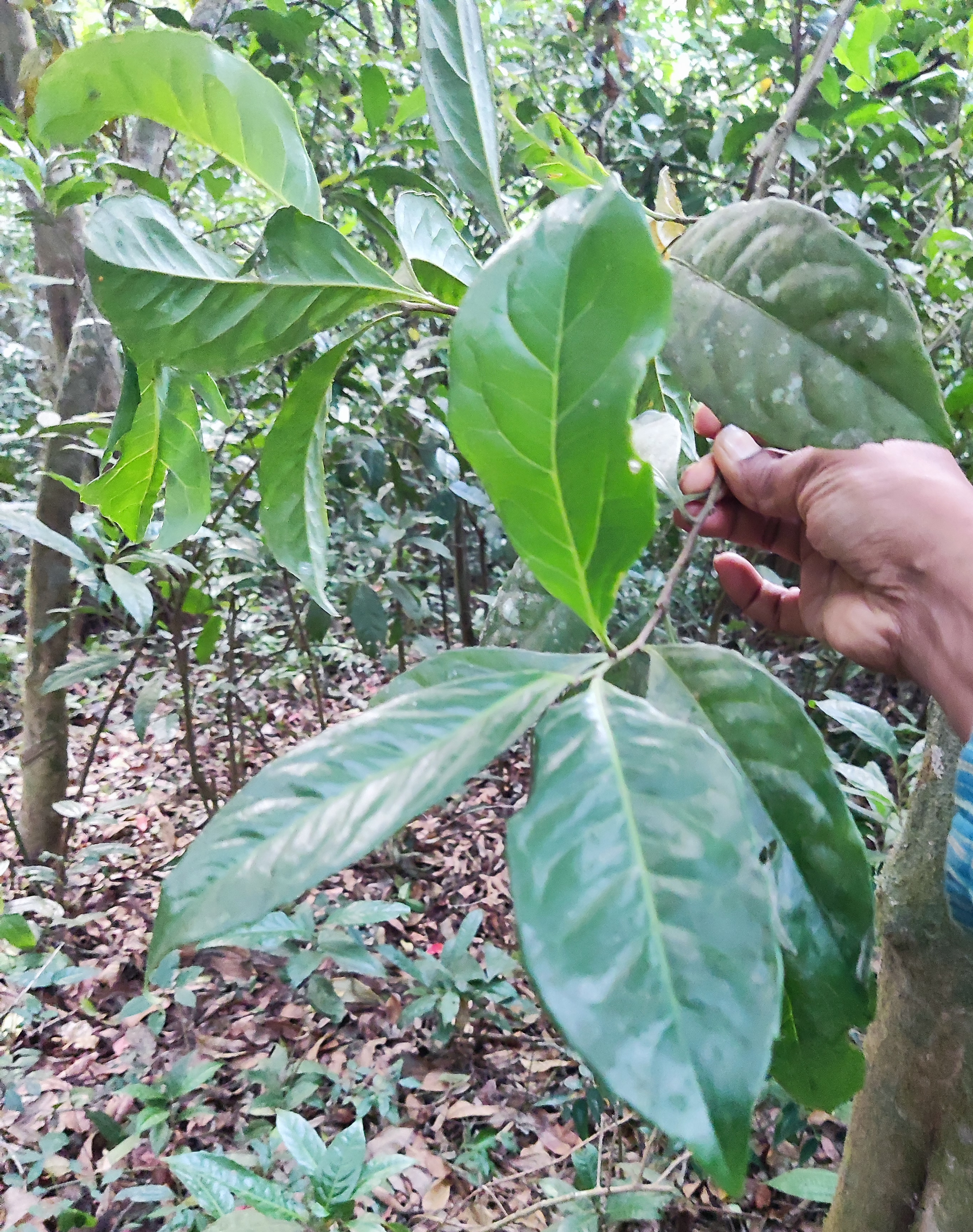

Conservation status
- Least Concern (IUCN 3.1)

Scientific classification
- Kingdom: Plantae
- Clade: Embryophytes
- Clade: Tracheophytes
- Clade: Angiosperms
- Clade: Eudicots
- Order: Proteales
- Family: Proteaceae
- Genus: Helicia
- Species: H. nilagirica

Binomial name
- Helicia nilagirica Bedd.

Synonyms
- Helicia cornifolia W.T.Wang; Helicia erratica Hook.f.; Helicia stricta Diels

= Helicia nilagirica =

Species of tree in Southeast Asia

Helicia nilagirica is a tree of the Proteaceae family. It grows from Thailand across Mainland Southeast Asia to Yunnan, Zhōngguó/China and over to Nepal. It is a source of wood (including firewood), a pioneer reafforestation taxa, and an ethnomedicinal plant.

== Description ==
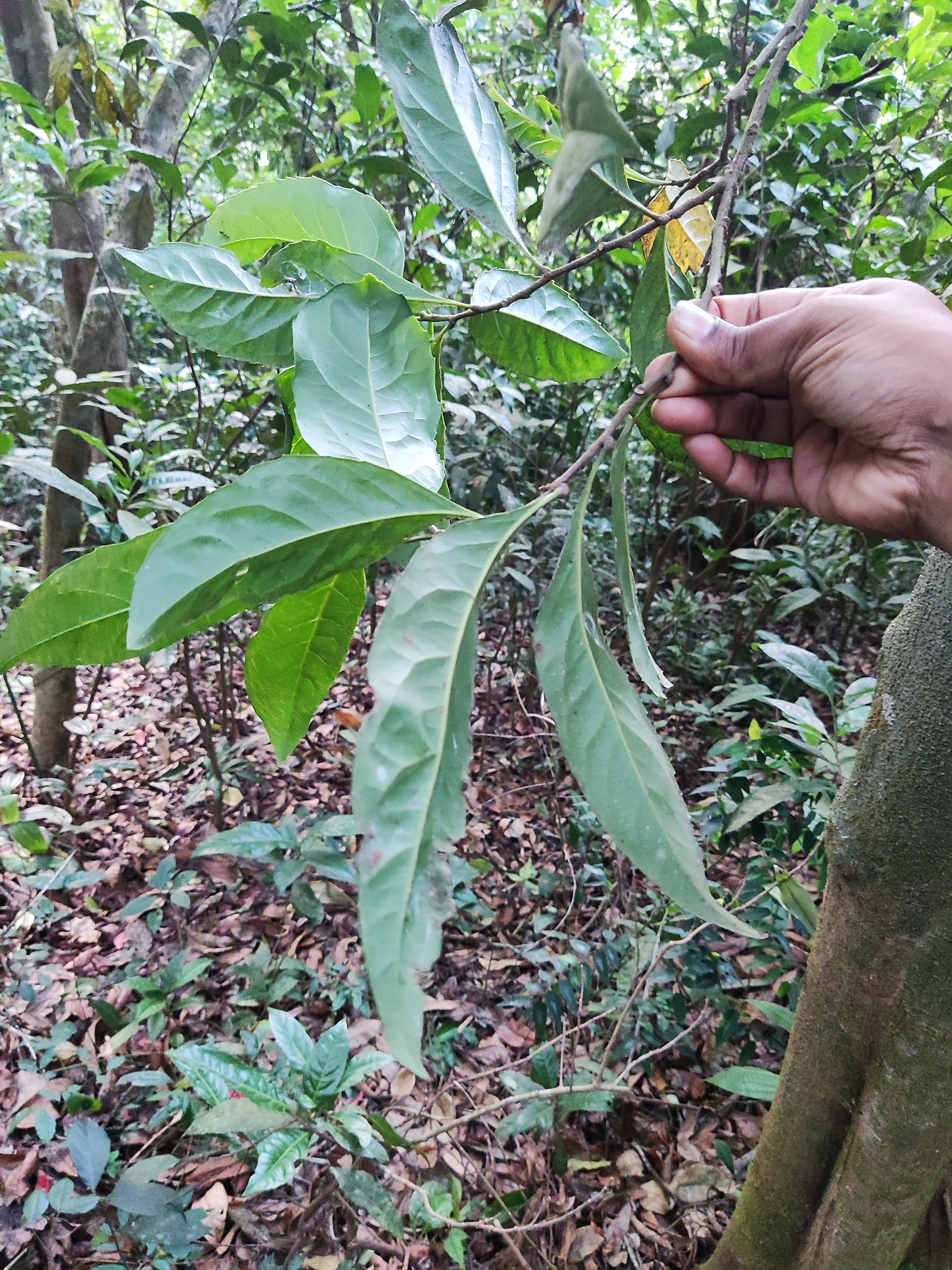

A tree that grows some 5–15 m (16–49 ft) tall. Leaves range from papery to leathery, as they age they become glabrous, cuneate base with is somewhat decurrent into the petiole, with an entire margin, though sometimes distinctly serrate or just serrate on the apical half, apex are either shortly acuminate, more or less acuminate or obtuse. Inflorescences are axillary or ramiflorous, some 10–18 cm (up to 24 cm) in size. The dark green fruit are ovoid to globose, some (2-)2.5-3.5 cm in diameter, pericarp is hard and leathery. The species flowers from May to August, fruiting occurs from November to July. Traits that can distinguish Helicia nilagirica from other Helicia species include: pilose bracts of flower pairs that are around 1 mm and pilose; the dark green fruit more or less globose, and some 2.5-3.5 cm in diameter; and the pericarp being 1.5-3 mm thick.

The trunks specific density is 0.61 g/cm^{3}, while the taxa's wood density is 0.65 g/cm^{3}.

== Distribution ==
The species is found from Thailand, across Mainland Southeast Asia to Zhōngguó/China and Nepal. Countries and regions that the plant occurs in are: Thailand; Cambodia; Vietnam; Zhōngguó/China (Yunnan); Laos; Myanmar; India (Assam, Sikkim, Meghalaya); Bhutan; and Nepal.

== Habitat and ecology ==
In many places the plant grows in tropical and subtropical moist angiosperm forest, clear forests and forest galleries. In the upper montane forest 2000-2600m) of Doi Inthanon National Park, Thailand, the tree is the most frequent of the taxa occurring there. The tree in China grows in or on angiosperm evergreen forests, mountain slopes and valleys, at elevations of 1,000–2,000 m (3,300–6,600 ft).

In the Tongbiguan Nature Reserve, Yunnan, the species is the host plant for the fungus Septobasidium heliciae, which itself is associated with a Lepidosaphes species of scale/mealybug.

It grows in subtropical wet angiosperm forest at Say Symper (1400-1760m.a.s.l., 14 km from Mawsynram, wettest place in India and perhaps the world, average annual rainfall 11,872mm). The tree is an important, frequent part of both Law Kyntang (Sacred forests, where only a few Non-timber forest products [NTFPS] are extracted, relatively undisturbed) and Law Raid (Group of villages' forest, where wood and NTFPs can be freely extracted, relatively disturbed).

== Conservation status ==
While Helicia nilagirica has a large overall population over an extended range, with a large number of observations, it may possibly be in decline in local areas due to land-use changes affecting its habitat, particularly in Yunnan.

== Vernacular names ==
The species common name in Thai is written เหมือดคนตัวผู้. In Cambodia, the plant is called luët tôch (Khmer). A name for the tree in Vietnamese is quắn hoa. Helicia nilagirica is known as 深绿山龙眼, shen lü shan long yan in Standard Chinese.

== Uses ==
The tree is used as a pioneer planting in reforestation work in Thailand. In Cambodia, the wood is used for temporary buildings, while the small twigs and branches are a source of firewood. In the wet forests of Maghalaya, the straight trunk of the tree is used to make handles for tools, including the popular coal digger. A study of the complete chloroplast genome suggest that the plant could be useful as rootstock or gene donor for the nut-crop tree Macadamia integrifolia.

The taxa is described as a medicinal plant, its fruit is the main source of helicid which has central nervous system inhibitory effects, while the fruit and leaves contain other useful compounds. Both the fruit and leaves have been used by various peoples in Yunnan.

Karen people, living in the Mae Chaem District use the leaves of the species as a compress to muscle pain in their ethnopharmacological system. Lawa people, living alongside the Karen villagers, do not use the taxa as an ethnomedicinal plant, which indicates that cultural history and background are more important factors in ethnopharmacology than geographic area.

== History ==
Helicia nilagrica was first described by the English infantry officer and naturalist, Colonel Richard Henry Beddome in 1864. At the time Chief Conservator of the Forest Department of the Madras Presidency, he published his research in the Madras Journal of Literature and Science.
