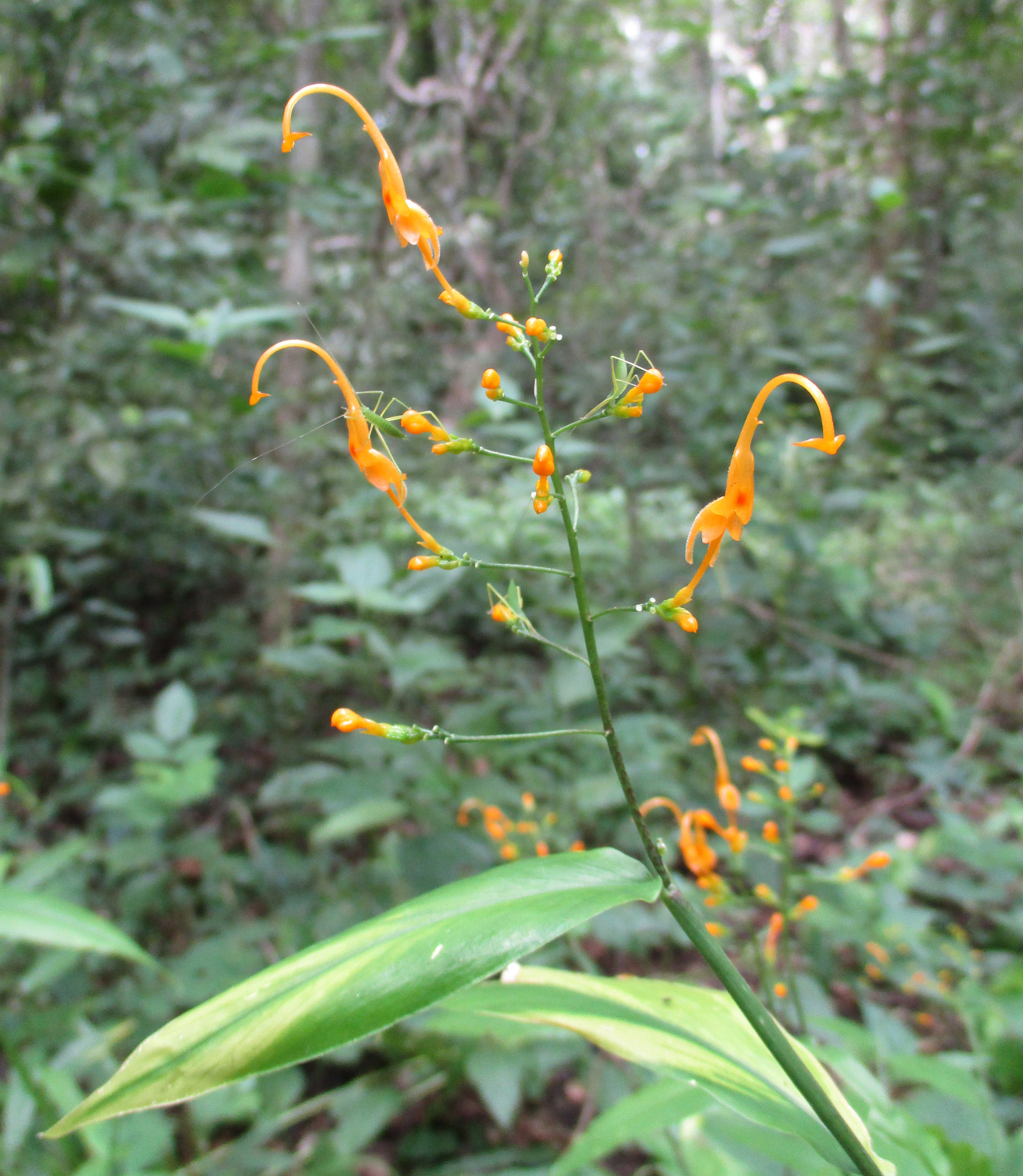
- G. albiflora var. aurea taken in Cat Tien National Park

Conservation status
- Near Threatened (IUCN 3.1)

Scientific classification
- Kingdom: Plantae
- Clade: Tracheophytes
- Clade: Angiosperms
- Clade: Monocots
- Clade: Commelinids
- Order: Zingiberales
- Family: Zingiberaceae
- Genus: Globba
- Species: G. albiflora

Binomial name
- Globba albiflora Ridl.

= Globba albiflora =

Species of flowering plant

Globba albiflora is a small plant in the ginger family, Zingiberaceae, sometimes called dancing ladies. This species can be found in Indo-China, Peninsular Malaysia and Sumatra; in Viet Nam the genus may likewise be called gừng vũ nữ or lô ba.

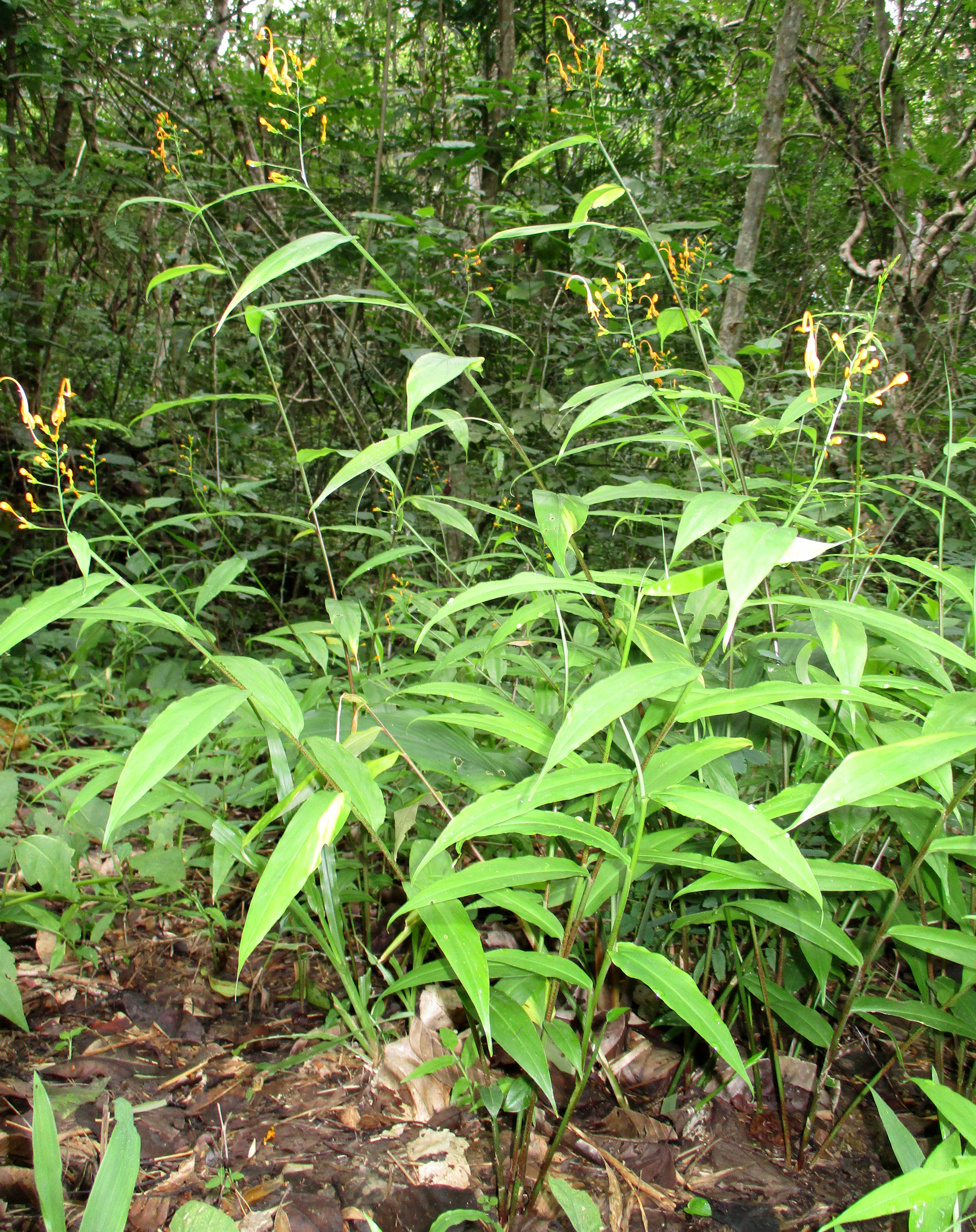

The variety called G. albiflora var. aurea Holttum is now Globba newmanii Sangvir..
