= Mae Ya Waterfall =

Waterfall in Doi Inthanon National Park

Coordinates: 18.4405°N 98.5925°E

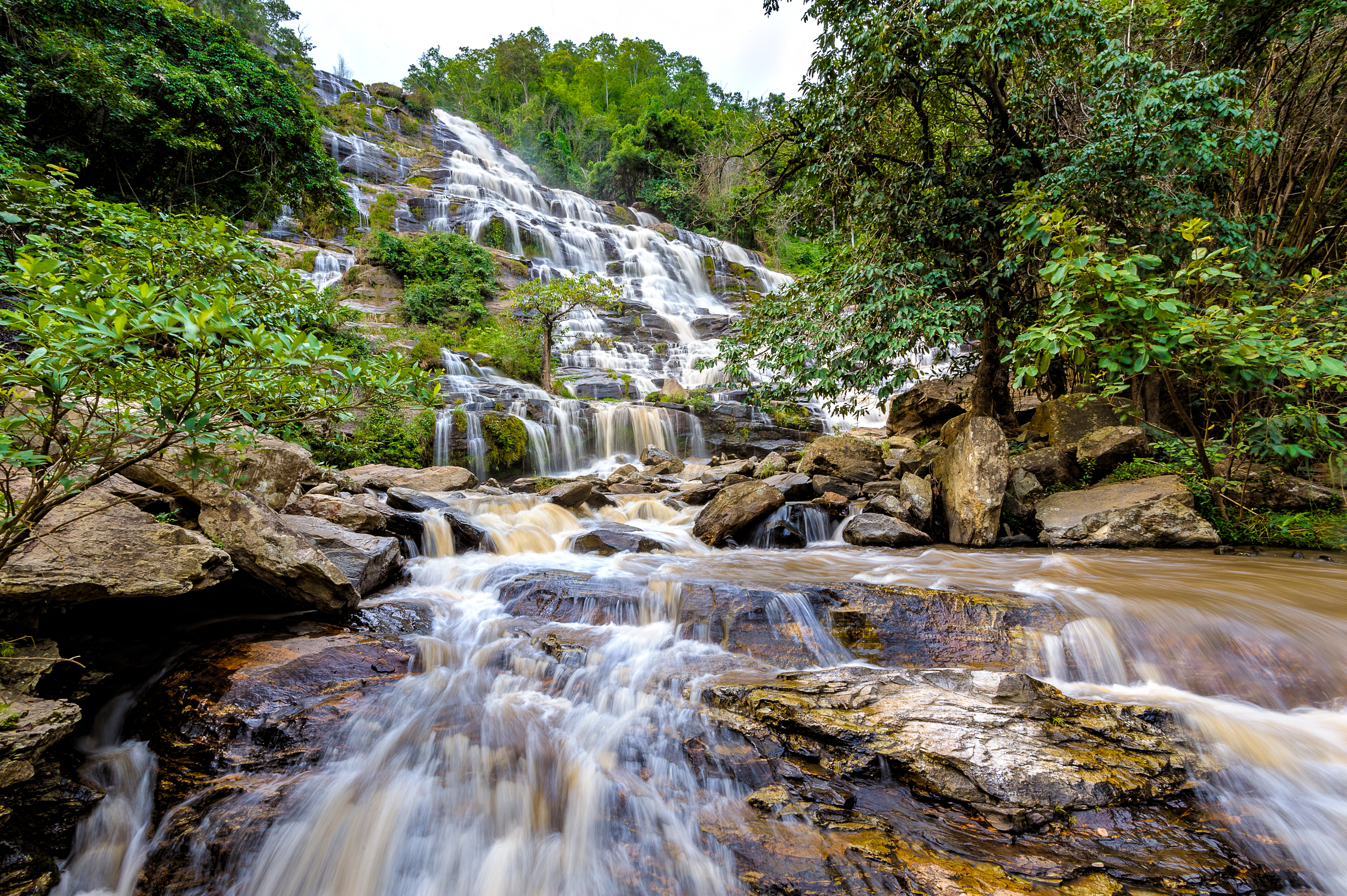
Mae Ya Waterfall

Mae Ya Waterfall (Thai: น้ำตกแม่ยะ) is a waterfall in Doi Inthanon National Park, Chom Thong District, Chiang Mai province, Thailand. It is located in the southern part of the national park and is formed by the Mae Ya stream.

Mae Ya is the largest and highest waterfall in Doi Inthanon National Park. Its water volume is greatest during the rainy season, while the water is clearer but less abundant during the dry season.

== Geography ==
The waterfall consists of about 30 tiers along a steep rock face, with a total height of approximately 280 metres. During the rainy season, the flow can spread to about 100 metres across the rock face before collecting in a pool below. Water levels are lower during the dry season, although the waterfall continues to flow throughout the year.

The surrounding vegetation is mixed deciduous forest, with teak, red and padauk among the principal tree species. Wildlife found in the surrounding national park includes serow, goral, deer and wild boar.

The waterfall is formed in an area where Carboniferous igneous rocks, including granite, occur in contact with metamorphic rocks. Gneiss is exposed in the area around the waterfall.

== Tourism ==
Mae Ya Waterfall is a tourist attraction within Doi Inthanon National Park. It can be reached from Highway 1009, the road connecting Chom Thong with Doi Inthanon. A turnoff from the highway leads to the waterfall, followed by a road of approximately 14 kilometers and a walk of about 200 meters to the waterfall.

Mae Ya Waterfall was designated a natural site worthy of conservation by a resolution of the Cabinet of Thailand on 7 November 1989.

== See also ==
- List of waterfalls
