= Globba argyrocycnos =

Scientific classification
- Kingdom: Plantae
- Clade: Tracheophytes
- Clade: Angiosperms
- Clade: Monocots
- Clade: Commelinids
- Order: Zingiberales
- Family: Zingiberaceae
- Genus: Globba
- Species: G. argyrocycnos

Binomial name
- Globba argyrocycnos Sangvir. & M.F.Newman

Species of plant

Globba argyrocycnos is a species of flowering plant in the family Zingiberaceae, native to Thailand. A stout herb of deciduous forests, it grows near streams close to sea level.
