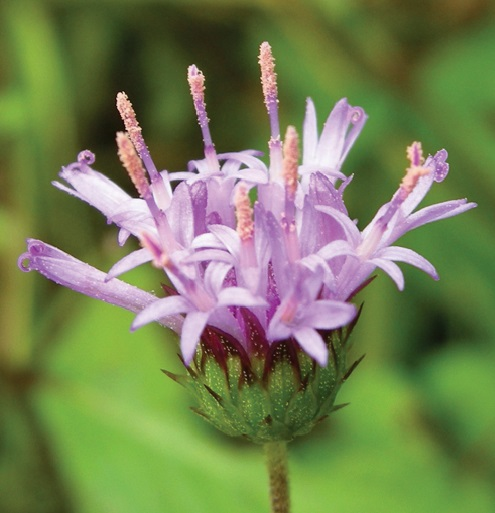
- Camchaya thailandica

Scientific classification
- Kingdom: Plantae
- Clade: Tracheophytes
- Clade: Angiosperms
- Clade: Eudicots
- Clade: Asterids
- Order: Asterales
- Family: Asteraceae
- Subfamily: Cichorioideae
- Tribe: Vernonieae
- Genus: Camchaya; Gagnep.

Type species
- Camchaya kampotensis Gagnep.

Synonyms
- Iodocephalus Thorel ex Gagnep.; Thorelia Gagnep.; Thoreliella C.Y.Wu

= Camchaya =

Genus of flowering plants

Camchaya is a genus of flowering plants in the family Asteraceae. They are native to Asia, including China, Laos, Thailand, Vietnam, and Cambodia.

These are annual herbs with coatings of hairs and globose glandular structures. The alternately arranged leaves have wavy or serrated blades on petioles. The inflorescence is a panicle which can be terminal or axillary. Some inflorescences have few flower heads, and some heads are solitary. The hemispherical head has up to 6 layers of phyllaries. It contains many purple florets which are tubular and expanded at the mouth into five pointed lobes and bear a long, branching style. The fruit is a compressed achene, usually with ten ribs, but sometimes with five. Some achenes have a pappus of up to 10 fragile bristles. The pollen of plants in the genus has a unique "6-porate echinolophate" morphology.

Accepted species

Species accepted by the Plants of the World Online as of March 2023:

- Camchaya bolavenensis Noyori, Komada, Soulad. & Tagane
- Camchaya calcicola Kitam.
- Camchaya gracilis (Thorel ex Gagnep.) Bunwong & H.Rob.
- Camchaya kampotensis Gagnep.
- Camchaya konplongensis Bien
- Camchaya loloana Dunn ex Kerr
- Camchaya pentagona H.Koyama
- Camchaya spinulifera H.Koyama
- Camchaya tenuiflora Kerr
- Camchaya thailandica Bunwong, Chantar. & S.C.Keeley

Some recent publications suggest moving some of these taxa to other genera (Vernonia and Iodocephalopsis).
