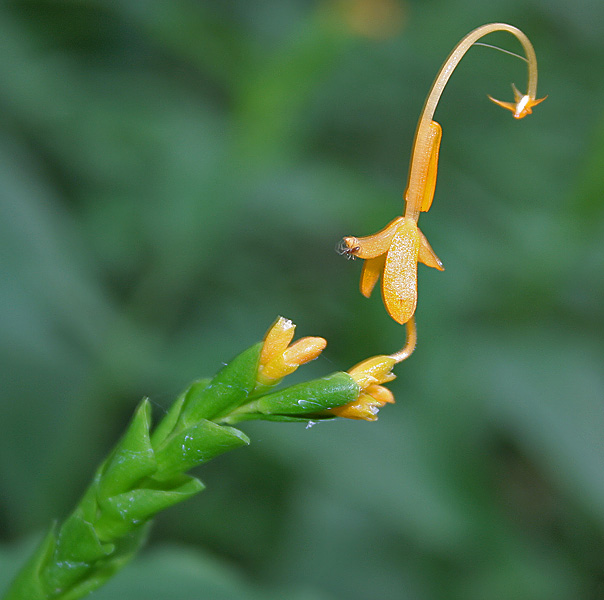
- Globba marantina (type species) from Talakona forest, India

Scientific classification
- Kingdom: Plantae
- Clade: Tracheophytes
- Clade: Angiosperms
- Clade: Monocots
- Clade: Commelinids
- Order: Zingiberales
- Family: Zingiberaceae
- Subfamily: Zingiberoideae
- Tribe: Globbeae
- Genus: Globba; L.

Synonyms
- Hura J.Koenig in A.J.Retzius; Lampujang J.Koenig in A.J.Retzius; Sphaerocarpos J.F.Gmel.; Manitia Giseke; Mantisia Sims; Ceratanthera Hornem.; Ceratanthera T.Lestib.; Colebrookia Donn ex T.Lestib.; Achilus Hemsl.

= Globba =

Genus of flowering plants

Globba is a genus of plants in the ginger family: with delicate flowers, sometimes called "dancing ladies" or "dancing girls ginger". Species are native to the Indian subcontinent, China, Southeast Asia, New Guinea, the Bismarck Archipelago and Queensland.

== Species ==
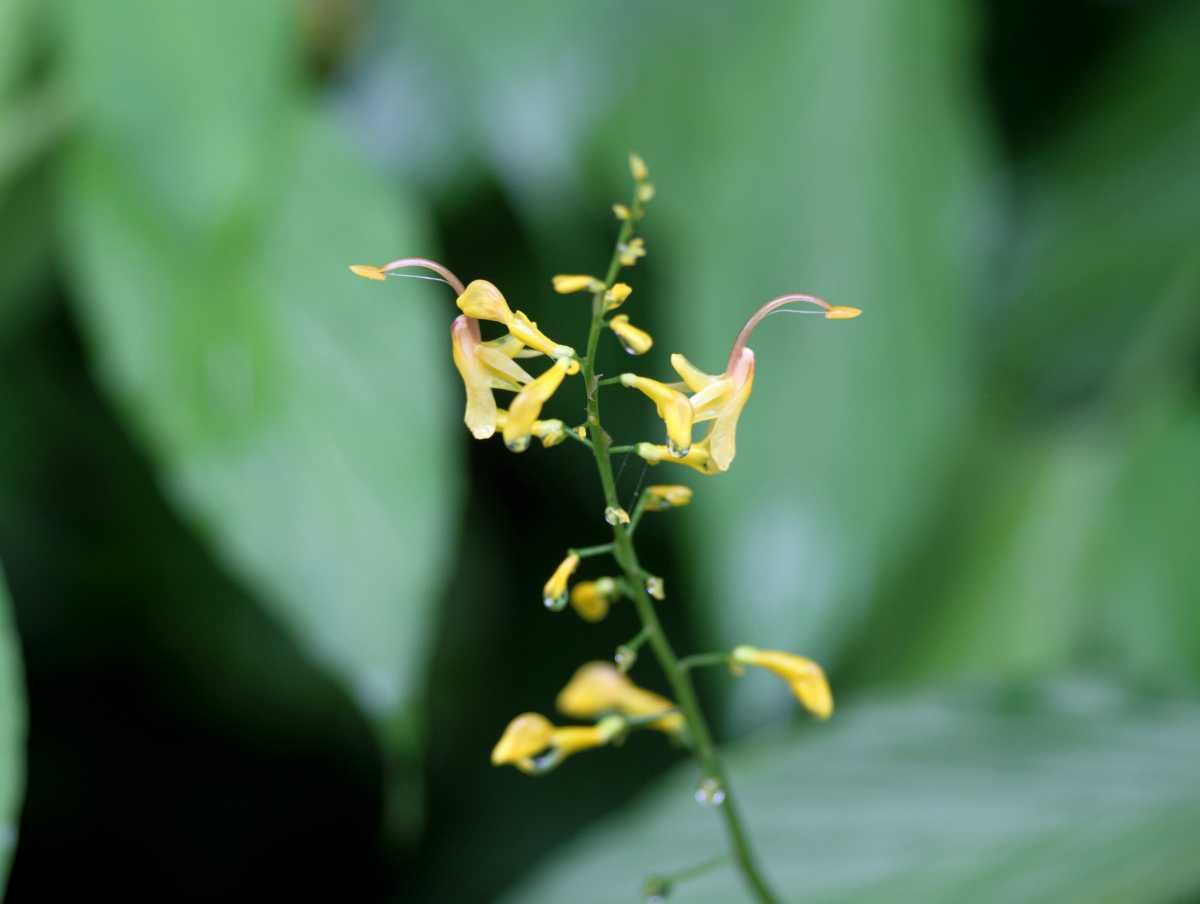
Globba racemosa

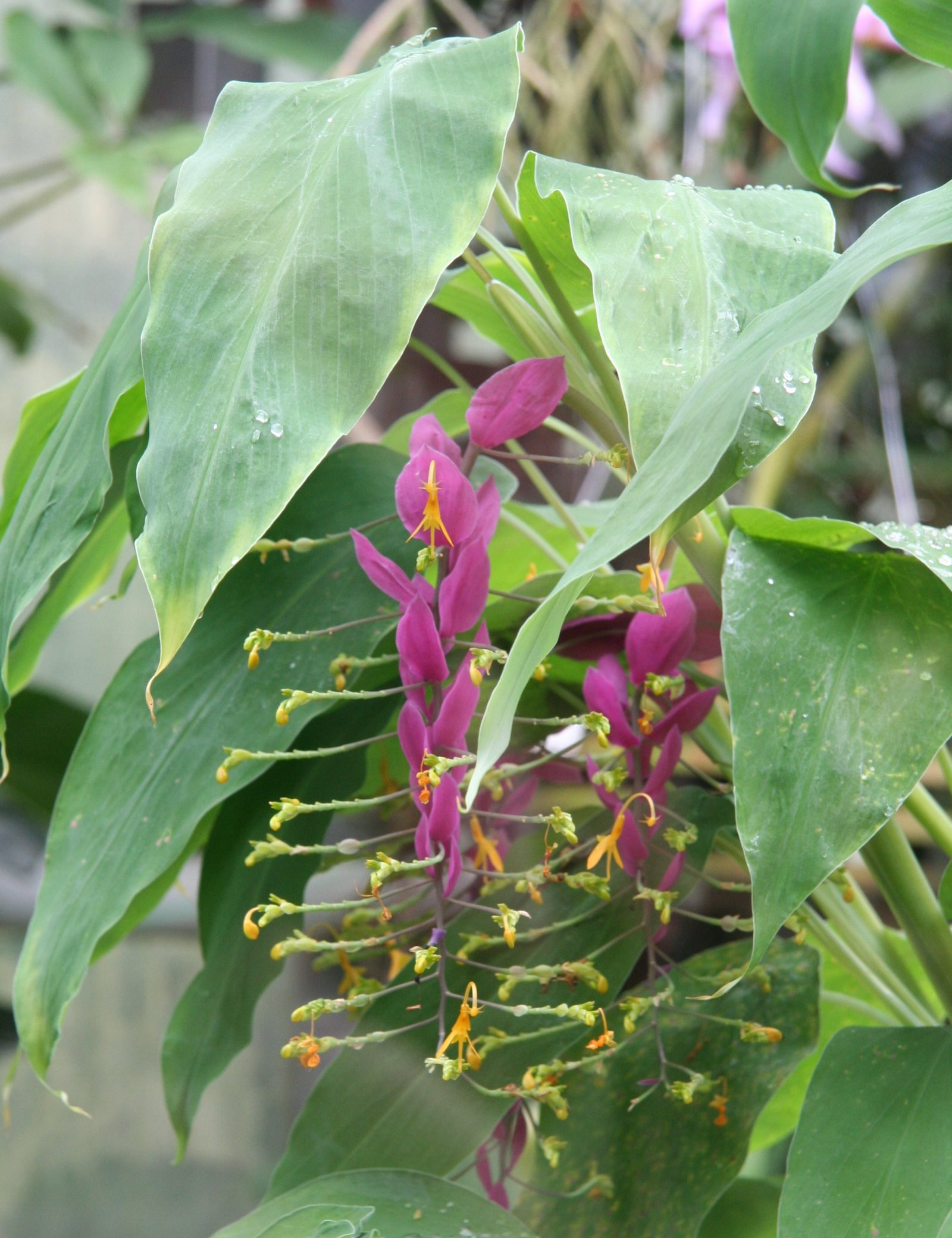
Globba winitii

Plants of the World Online includes:

1. Globba acehensis A.Takano & H.Okada - Sumatra
2. Globba adhaerens Gagnep. - Indochina
3. Globba albiflora Ridl. - western Indochina, peninsular Malaysia
4. Globba albobracteata N.E.Br. - Sumatra
5. Globba amnicola M.F.Newman & Sangvir. - Thailand
6. Globba amplectens M.F.Newman - Thailand
7. Globba andersonii C.B.Clarke ex Baker - eastern Himalayas
8. Globba angcorensis Gagnep. - Cambodia, Vietnam
9. Globba annamensis Gagnep. - Laos, Vietnam
10. Globba aranyaniae Sangvir. & M.F.Newman - Thailand to Laos
11. Globba argyrocycnos Sangvir. & M.F.Newman - Thailand
12. Globba arracanensis Kurz - northern Myanmar
13. Globba atrosanguinea Teijsm. & Binn. - Sumatra, Borneo
14. Globba aurantiaca Miq. - Sumatra
15. Globba aurea Elmer - Palawan, Busuanga
16. Globba bicolor Gagnep. - Cambodia, Vietnam
17. Globba bokorensis Nob.Tanaka & Tagane - Cambodia
18. Globba brachyanthera K.Schum. - Sumatra, Borneo
19. Globba bracteolata Wall. ex Baker - Bangladesh, Assam, Myanmar
20. Globba brevifolia (K.Schum.) K.Schum. - Luzon
21. Globba cambodgensis Gagnep. - Cambodia, Vietnam, Thailand
22. Globba campsophylla K.Schum. - Philippines
23. Globba candida Gagnep. - Cambodia
24. Globba cataractarum Sangvir. & M.F.Newman - Thailand
25. Globba cernua Baker - Myanmar, Thailand, Malaysia, Sumatra
26. Globba chekiangensis G.Y.Li, Z.H.Chen & G.H.Xia - Zhejiang
27. Globba chrysantha Sangvir. & M.F.Newman - Thailand
28. Globba chrysochila Sangvir. & M.F.Newman - Thailand
29. Globba clarkei Baker - Nepal, Sikkim, Bhutan, Assam, Arunachal Pradesh, Bangladesh, Thailand
30. Globba colpicola K.Schum. - Thailand
31. Globba conferta M.F.Newman - Thailand
32. Globba corneri A.A.Weber - Malaysia
33. Globba curtisii Holttum - Malaysia
34. Globba dasycarpa M.F.Newman - Thailand
35. Globba decora Sangvir. & M.F.Newman - Thailand
36. Globba depingiana Y.H.Tan & H.B.Ding - Yunnan
37. Globba emeiensis Z.Y.Zhu - Sichuan
38. Globba expansa Wall. ex Horan. - Myanmar, Thailand (syn. G. yeatsiana Craib)
39. Globba fecunda A.Takano & H.Okada - Sumatra
40. Globba flagellaris K.Larsen - Thailand
41. Globba flavibracteata A.Takano & H.Okada - Sumatra
42. Globba fragilis S.N.Lim - Thailand, Langkawi
43. Globba francisci Ridl. - Sabah, Sarawak
44. Globba garrettii Kerr - Thailand
45. Globba geoffrayi Gagnep. - Cambodia
46. Globba glandulosa Ridl. - Sarawak
47. Globba globulifera Gagnep. - Thailand, Vietnam
48. Globba gracilis K.Schum. - Mindanao
49. Globba grandis Sangvir. - Thailand
50. Globba hasseltii Boerl. - Sumatra
51. Globba hilaris Sangvir. - Indochina
52. Globba holttumii S.N.Lim - Malaysia
53. Globba impar M.F.Newman & H.Ð.Trần - Vietnam
54. Globba insectifera Ridl. - Myanmar, Thailand (syn. G. kerrii Craib, G. nuda K.Larsen)
55. Globba integra Ridl. - Thailand
56. Globba × intermedia S.N.Lim - Malaysia (G. cernua × G. patens)
57. Globba janae Sangvir. & M.F.Newman - Laos
58. Globba kanchigandhii A.Joe & M.Sabu - Assam (Nagaland)
59. Globba keithii Ridl. - Thailand
60. Globba laeta K.Larsen - Myanmar, Thailand
61. Globba lancangensis Y.Y.Qian - Yunnan
62. Globba larsenii Sangvir. & M.F.Newman - Thailand
63. Globba latifolia Ridl. - Philippines
64. Globba leucantha Miq. - Thailand, Malaysia, Sumatra
65. Globba lilacina Sangvir. & M.F.Newman - Philippines
66. Globba lithophila Sangvir. & M.F.Newman - Thailand
67. Globba longiligulata Sangvir. - Thailand
68. Globba luteola Sangvir. - Thailand
69. Globba macrocarpa Gagnep. - Indochina
70. Globba macrochila Sangvir. & M.F.Newman - Nepal, eastern Himalayas
71. Globba macroclada Gagnep. - Java
72. Globba maculata Blume - widespread through the Indian Subcontinent and Southeast Asia (Indochina, Malaysia, Indonesia, Philippines, etc.) as well as Yunnan, New Guinea, the Bismarck Archipelago, and Mer ( = Murray Island in Queensland)
73. Globba magnibracteata Y.Y.Sam - Yunnan
74. Globba marantina L. - widespread in Tropical Asia to Queensland - type species
75. Globba menglianensis Y.Y.Qian - Myanmar
76. Globba mogokensis W.W.Sm. & S.C.Banerji - Assam, Bangladesh, eastern Himalayas, Myanmar
77. Globba mollis Sangvir. & M.F.Newman - Sumatra
78. Globba multiflora Wall. ex Baker - Borneo
79. Globba multifolia A.Takano & H.Okada - Sumatra
80. Globba muluensis R.M.Sm. - Borneo
81. Globba nawawii Ibrahim & K.Larsen - Terengganu
82. Globba newmanii Sangvir. - Indochina, Peninsular Malaysia
83. Globba nisbetiana Craib - Thailand
84. Globba nitens Sangvir. & M.F.Newman - Thailand
85. Globba nitida M.F.Newman & Sangvir. - Thailand
86. Globba obscura K.Larsen - Thailand
87. Globba orixensis Roxb. - Bangladesh, eastern India, Myanmar
88. Globba paniculata Valeton - Sumatra
89. Globba parva Gagnep. - Indochina
90. Globba parviflora C.Presl - Philippines
91. Globba patens Miq. - Thailand, Malaysia, Sumatra
92. Globba pauciflora King ex Baker - Myanmar, Andaman & Nicobar Islands
93. Globba pelecanthera Sangvir. & M.F.Newman - Thailand, Laos
94. Globba pendula Roxb. - Assam, Bangladesh, Sri Lanka, Indochina, western Indonesia, Malaysia, Andaman Islands
95. Globba philippinensis Naive, J.A.G.Dalisay, Bangcaya & Sangvir. - Philippines
96. Globba platystachya Baker - southern India
97. Globba poomae Sangvir. & M.F.Newman - Thailand
98. Globba praecox K.J.Williams & Paisooks. - Thailand
99. Globba praetermissa J.Y.Jin, L.Bai & N.H.Xia - Yunnan
100. Globba propinqua Ridl. - Borneo
101. Globba pumila Ridl. - Sarawak
102. Globba purpurascens Craib - Thailand
103. Globba pycnostachys Sangvir. & M.F.Newman - Thailand
104. Globba pyramidata Gagnep. - Cambodia, Vietnam, Mindanao
105. Globba pyrrhopoikila Sangvir. & M.F.Newman - Sumatra
106. Globba racemosa Sm. - Himalayas, southern China, Myanmar, Thailand
107. Globba radicalis Roxb. - eastern Himalayas
108. Globba rahmanii Yusof - Bangladesh
109. Globba ranongensis Picheans. & Tiyaw. - Thailand
110. Globba reflexa Craib - Thailand
111. Globba rosea Gagnep. - Laos
112. Globba ruiliensis X.D.Ma, W.G.Wang & J.Y.Shen - Yunnan
113. Globba rupestris Sangvir. & M.F.Newman - Laos
114. Globba salarkhanii (M.A.Rahman & Yusuf) Govaerts - Bangladesh
115. Globba schomburgkii Hook.f. - Yunnan, Assam, Indochina
116. Globba securifer Sangvir. & M.F.Newman - Cambodia
117. Globba sessiliflora Sims - India, Myanmar, Thailand
118. Globba sherwoodiana W.J.Kress & V.Gowda - Assam, Myanmar
119. Globba siamensis (Hemsl.) Hemsl. - Thailand, Laos, Cambodia
120. Globba sirirugsae Saensouk & P.Saensouk - Thailand
121. Globba spathulata Roxb. - eastern Himalayas
122. Globba subscaposa Collett & Hemsl. - Myanmar
123. Globba substrigosa King ex Baker - Myanmar, Thailand
124. Globba talangensis A.Takano & H.Okada - Sumatra
125. Globba tembatensis Y.Y.Sam & Julius - Malaysia
126. Globba thorelii Gagnep. - Thailand, Vietnam, Cambodia
127. Globba tricolor Ridl. - Borneo
128. Globba unifolia Ridl. - Malaysia, Thailand
129. Globba urophylla K.Schum. - Maluku
130. Globba ustulata Gagnep. - Balabac, Vietnam
131. Globba variabilis Ridl. - Thailand, Malaysia, Sumatra
132. Globba verecunda M.F.Newman & Sangvir. - Thailand
133. Globba virginea I.M.Turner - N. & W. Sumatra
134. Globba wardii (B.L.Burtt & R.M.Sm.) K.J.Williams - Mizoram, Myanmar
135. Globba wengeri (C.E.C.Fisch.) K.J.Williams - Assam, Myanmar
136. Globba williamsiana M.F.Newman & Sangvir. - Thailand
137. Globba winitii C.H.Wright - Thailand, Myanmar
138. Globba xantholeuca Craib - Thailand
