= Khruba Siwichai =

Renowned Thai Buddhist monk (1878-1939)

- ᩕᨣᩪᨷᩤᨧᩮᩢ᩶ᩣᩈᩦᩅᩥᨩᩱ᩠ᨿ ครูบาศรีวิชัย
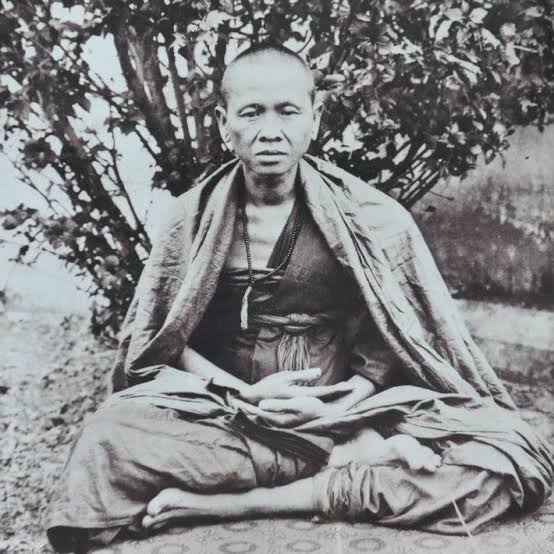
- Khruba Siwichai, circa 1930s

Personal life
- Born: Fuen or Fahong; 11 June 1878 Ban Pang, Li District, Lamphun Province, Thailand
- Died: 21 February 1939 (aged 60) Ban Pang, Li District, Lamphun Province, Thailand

Religious life
- Religion: Buddhism
- Temple: Wat Ban Pang
- School: Theravada
- Dharma name: Sirivijaya

Khruba Siwichai (Northern Thai: ᩕᨣᩪᨷᩤᨧᩮᩢ᩶ᩣᩈᩦᩅᩥᨩᩱ᩠ᨿ; Thai: ครูบาศรีวิชัย, also spelled Kruba Srivichai) was a Thai Buddhist monk born in 1878 in the village of Ban Pang, Li District, in Lamphun Province of northern Thailand. Siwichai is best known for the building of many temples during his time, his charismatic and personalistic character, and his political conflict with local authorities.

== Early life and rise to monkhood ==
Siwichai was born to a humble peasant family in Ban Pang. Early accounts suggest that on the particular day that he was born there was a heavy thunderstorm and rain and was thus given the name of In Fuen, "quake" or Fahong, "thunder". Given the context of his birth, many around his village accredited him as the phu mee boon or a person having merit. As a child, Fahong has been described to have compassion with all beings. Previous biographies cite that as a child he would release the animals that his father caught for cooking or beg him to not hit fish as their heads would hurt.

From an early age, Fahong expressed a serious interest in Buddhism as he believed that his family's present state of poverty was a consequence of his misbehavior in his previous life and became a well behaved monk so his parents would have a better life. He was ordained as a novice (samanera) at the age of 18 at the local temple in the village of Ban Pang. Fahong was ordained as a monk in 1899 at Wat Ban Hong Luang at which point the took a religious name of Phra Siwichai and went on to study with his first teacher, Khruba Khattiya in Wat Bang Pan.

As a student, the Khruba was known to have great respect and reverence towards the science of magic and spells. Additionally, Khruba Siwichai gained reputation for his asceticism. Traditional accounts of his early career suggest Khruba Siwichai was an exemplary Buddhist monk, eating only one vegetarian meal a day and refraining from "habit-forming practices as chewing betel and fermented tea leaves, and smoking". His generosity and compassion were evident to everyone around him. One of his biographers Sanga Suphapha said the following:

He showed compassion and mercy towards anyone who appealed to him ... he did nothing that was useful to himself. He was not a monk of rank, but only a monk of the people ... As a result he was always moving about, doing useful things wherever he went ... They were things that led Buddhists to rejoice that a monk with the wide heart of a Bodhisattva had been born into the world.

== Temple constructions ==
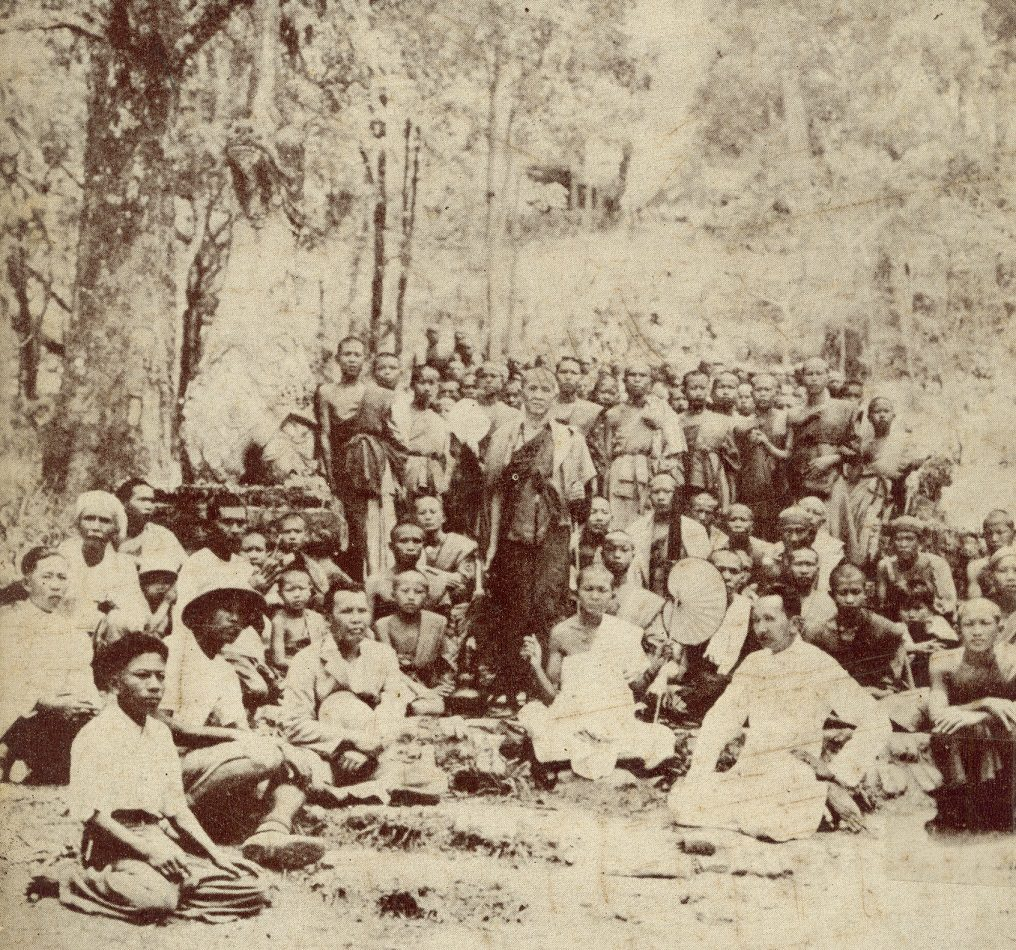
Khruba Siwichai and his followers at the stairs of Wat Phra That Doi Suthep, 1935

Khruba Siwichai became the new abbot of Wat Ban Pang after the former abbot, Khruba Khattiya, died. Soon after, he began building a new temple and finished it in 1904, naming it Wat Sri Don Chai Sai Mun Bun Rueng even though villagers still referred to it as a Wat Ban Pang. This new temple was but the beginning of a career involving the repair and construction of more than one hundred religious and non-religious projects such as temples, roads, and bridges. Some of his more renowned monuments were temples on the top of Doi Suthep, the Suan Dok temple in Chiang Mai and the reliquary at the Camthewi temple in Lamphun. Villagers were urged to donate their money and labor as an act of merit (bun). Nationally known Buddhist monk and writer Phikkhu Panyanantha described Khruba Siwichai as a monk not of rank, but of the people and gained massive popular support and the status of a ton bun (holy men). A highly respected northern Thai monk writes:

Khruba Siwichai had done many good deeds to Buddhism. His goodness could hardly fade away from northern people' minds and especially for his many construction and renovation works. It seems that there were no other monks in this region who had done such thing like Khruba Siwichai.

The Khruba's charismatic, and often rebellious, personality increased his reputation and influence. Many began to ascribe the title of bodhisatta with miraculous powers. Early biographies report that the renovated Wat Phra Singha temple was constructed with the help of angels as the workers who were constructing the temple found pots full of gold. Other accounts suggest that when working in any weather conditions they did not get hot or wet. Khruba consistently denied having these special powers, but his public ascription as a bodhisatta remained.

== Conflict with local and national authorities ==
Khruba Siwichai came into serious conflict with the sangha, the authorities of the national order of monks, and the Siamese state. The Sangha Act of 1902 stipulated that monk ordinations by any senior monk required the permission of his respective sangha superior and of the District Officer. Khruba Siwichai had ordained monks and novices without been officially recognized as a "preceptor of the Thai hierarchy" leading to his confinement in a temple in Lamphun in about 1915-1916. Siwichai's perceived ignorance and disregard for the law led to his years of imprisonment.

While most of the scholarship centers on that charge as the source of Siwichai's conflict, available evidence may complicate this issue. Firstly, Siwichai may have been fully aware and willing to comply with the law. Apparently, two officials within the central Thai administration, the kromakarn which represented the Religious Affairs Department and the naaj amphur who worked on behalf of the Ministry of Interior, denied Siwichai's request to appoint the monks. A detailed account in the Bangkok Times Weekly Mail describes the situation:

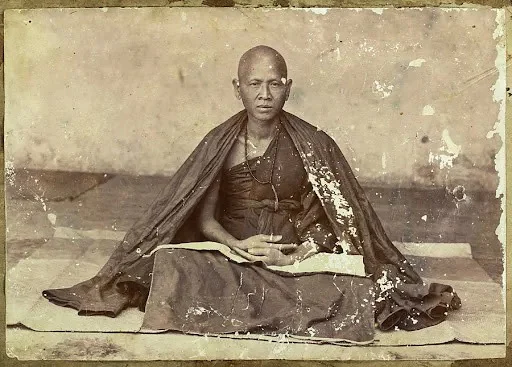
Khruba Siwichai when he was arrested at Wat Sri Don Chai, Chiang Mai

About five years ago the [Siwichai] proposed to ordain a new priest, and the sent the Kamnan [subdistrict head] and head-man of the village to ask for a license from the Kromakarn and Nai Amphur. They were told that the license would be issued later, and that meantime they could be preparing for the ceremony. The priest did make the preparations - a Buat Nak [ordination ceremony] costs some money - and when it was near lent, the again sent the Kamnan and Phu Yai Ban [village headman] to get the promised license. This time it was definitely refused. Taking the view that there was nothing wrong in ordaining an honest man, the priest carried out the rite without a license.

Siwichai was indeed the Abbot of his village temple at the time and the head of the temple in his subdistrict. Having held the title of priesthood for more than ten years, it is likely that he would have been in good standing to conduct and approve his own ordinations. It is much more plausible that the secular officials may have denied approval of the monks that were to be ordained due to certain clauses in the 1913 Ordination act. The act lists punishments for monks who ordained "forbidden" men which may have ranged from people pending court cases, evading taxes, or people simply fleeing taxes or military service.

Furious over Siwichai's insubordination, he was arrested by the police and brought to the Wat Lii Luang temple where the district prelate Phrakhru Maharatnkhon resided. However, he was quickly sent to the temple of Lapmhun out of fear of the growing following that had gathered over the last four days in front of Wat Lii Luang. He was released soon after in Lamphun. Siwichai was arrested again a year after his initial imprisonment. The district prelate ordered all monks and novices under his jurisdiction to meet in order to certify that the religious leaders were acting in accord with all regulations. Once Siwichai decided not to go, the rest of the monks decided to not go as well. Consequently, Siwichai was arrested once again and brought to the prelate in Lamphun. A committee was appointed by the provincial prelate and decided to forbid Siwichai to perform his duties as an ordainer and was demoted from his role as an abbot and subdistrict head. Siwichai was thus imprisoned for one year at Wat Phrathat Haripunchai in the city of Lamphun and returned to his temple in Baang Pang. This time, however, without the title of abbot and subdistrict head.

Siwichai was consequently banned from Lamphun in January 1918. However, he refused to leave and in 1920 was invited by the lord (chao) of Lamphun to receive the alms of the city. On his Journey to Lamphun, then was followed by nearly 600 men and women, leading the officials to think that the "priest had come to create a revolt" and was, once again, arrested in Waluang. This was brought to the attention of the Supreme Patriarch (sangharaja) in Bangkok who formed a committee in order to investigate the eight charges brought against Siwichai. The committee concluded ruled that the punishment of imprisonment for the ordination of monks should have come from Bangkok and that Siwichai's failure to attend the meetings were too severe. The supreme patriarch sent him home and even contributed funds to help the costs of his journey back. In this sense, it is apparent that the Bangkok sangha recognized many of Siwichai's actions and his refusal to cooperate with many of the local secular officials.

== Death and influence ==
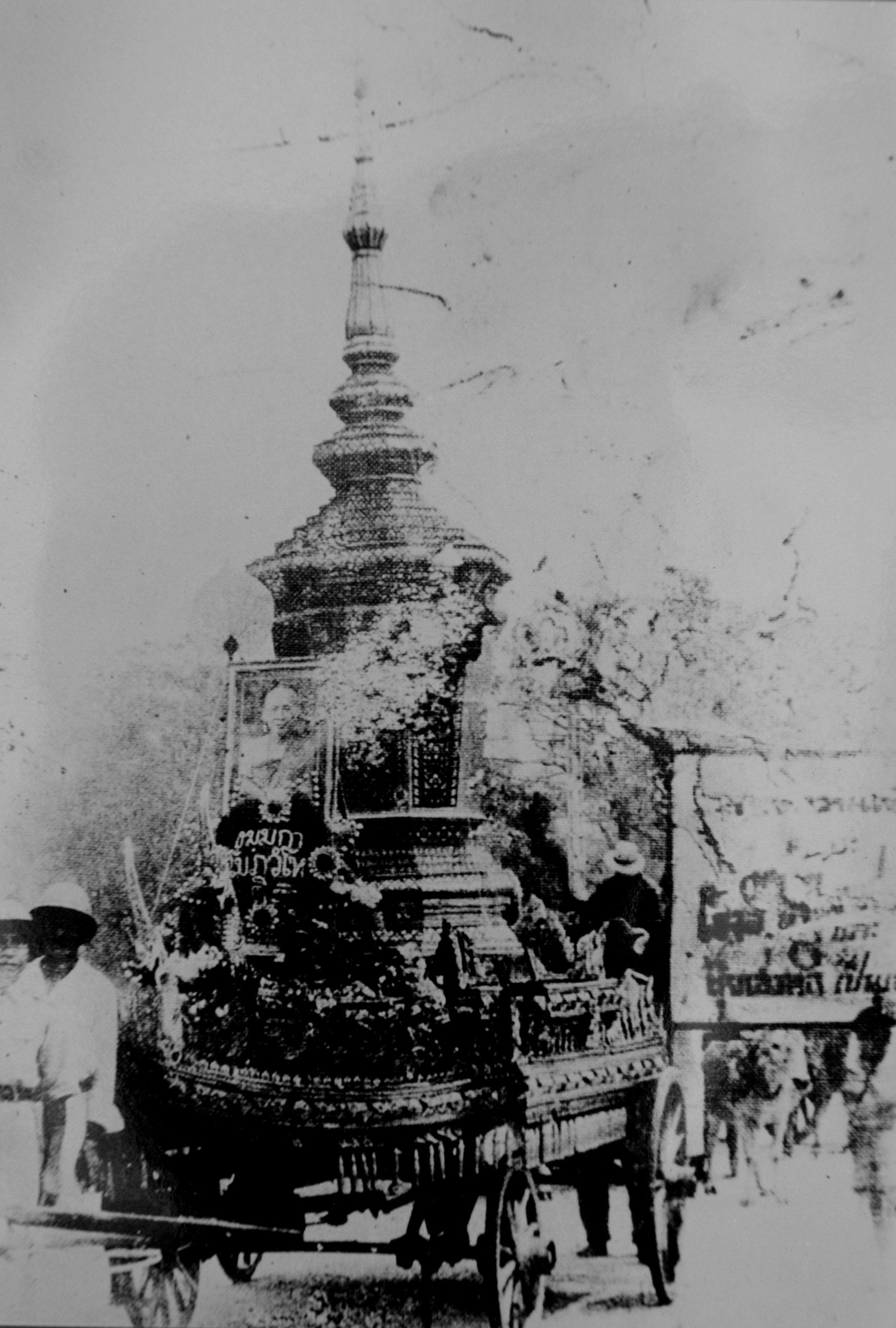
Khruba Siwichai funeral procession, 1946

The Khruba died near the age of 61 in his home village at Wat Ban Pang on 21 February 1939. He died out of exhaustion and sickness, which were largely influenced by a long battle with hemorrhoids. His body was cremated in 1946. Early accounts record that in the day of his cremation the sky became suddenly dark with heavy unexpected rain although it was not rainy season.

Today, the Wat Ban Pang temple serves as a museum for the late Khruba, built by one of his original biographers Phra Anan Phutthathammo in June 1989. The museum's entrance is protected by two statues of a Tiger from Khruba Siwichai's birth year. By the staircase, a small shrine has been placed for monks and others to worship Khruba Siwichai and recite his prayers. The museum features collections of paraphernalia associated with his various construction projects, including maps, a bench for resting, and a carrier bicycle. Additionally, the most notable temples that the Khruba built contain shrines built in his honour. For instance, the temple of Wat Phra Singha contains a shrine of Khruba Siwichai and features a long bronze statue of him, standing, in front of the "vihara". Similar bronze statues can be seen in the Wat Suan Dok temple and at the hilltop of Doi Suthep.

== List of places that Khruba Siwichai built or restored ==
List of temples that Khruba Siwichai built or restored (It is believed that there are still some that have been overlooked)

=== Lamphun province ===
==== Ban Hong district ====
- Wat Ban Hong Luang, Ban Hong subdistrict
- Wat Doi Kom, Ban Hong subdistrict
- Wat Huai Ka, Ban Hong subdistrict
- Wat Ku khao, Pa Phlu subdistrict
- Wat Pa Phlu, Pa Phlu subdistrict
- Wat Phra Phutthabat Sam Yod, Pa Phlu subdistrict
- Wat Wang Luang, Pa Phlu subdistrict

==== Ban Thi district ====
- Wat Phra That Doi Hang Bat, Huai Yap subdistrict

==== Li district ====
- Wat Ban Pang, Si Wichai subdistrict
- Wat Mae Tuen, Mae Tuen subdistrict
- Wat Mae Thoei, Mae Tuen subdistrict
- Wat Mae Pok, Si Wichai subdistrict
- Wat Phra That Chom Sawan, Dong Dam subdistrict
- Wat Phra That Duang Diao, Li subdistrict
- Wat Phra That Ha Duang, Li subdistrict

==== Mae Tha district, Lamphun ====
- Wat Tha Doi Chae, Tha Kat subdistrict
- Wat Tha Doi Kham, Tha Kat subdistrict
- Wat Tha Doi Krang, Tha Khum Ngoen subdistrict

==== Mueang Lamphun district ====
- Sriwichai Anusorn Bridge
- Wat Attharot, Nai Mueang subdistrict (now part of Wat Phra That Hariphunchai)
- Wat Chang Si, Nai Mueang subdistrict
- Wat Chamadevi, Nai Mueang subdistrict
- Wat Chiang Yan, Nai Mueang subdistrict (Now part of Wat Phra That Hariphunchai)
- Wat Chai Mongkhon, Nai Mueang subdistrict
- Wat Doi Ti, Pa Sak subdistrict
- Wat Maneeyaram, Ton Thong subdistrict
- Wat Phra That Hariphunchai, Nai Mueang subdistrict
- Wat Phra Yuen, Wiang Yong subdistrict
- War Pratu Pa, Pratu Pa subdistrict
- Wat Sri Bunruang, Nai Mueang subdistrict
- Wat Suphanrangsi, Nai Mueang subdistrict
- Wat Ton Chok, Mueang Chi subdistrict
- Wat Ton Phueng, Mueang Nga subdistrict

==== Pa Sang district ====
- Wat Chang Khao Noi Nuea, Pa Sang subdistrict (Kruba Siwichai donated fund)
- Wat Phra Non Mon Chang, Makok subdistrict
- Wat Phra Phutthabat Tak Pha, Makok subdistrict
- Wat Nong Soi, Makok subdistrict

==== Thung Hua Chang district ====
- Wat Don Kaew, Ban Puang subdistrict
- Wat Hua Kua, Thung Hua Chang subdistrict
- Wat Nong Pa Tueng, Thung Hua Chang subdistrict
- Wat Thung Hua Chang, Thung Hua Chang subdistrict

=== Chiang Mai province ===
==== Chai Prakan district ====
- Wat Tham Tap Tao, Si Dong Yen subdistrict
- Wat Pra That Chom Kiri, Mae Thalop subdistrict

==== Chiang Dao district ====
- Wat Chom Khiri, Mae Na subdistrict
- Wat Pang Ma O, Mueang Na subdistrict
- Wat Mae It, Chiang Dao subdistrict
- Wat Tham Chiang Dao, Chiang Dao subdistrict

==== Chom Thong district ====
- Wat Phrabat Huai Ei Ling, Sop Tia subdistrict
- Wat Phra That Si Chom Chaeng (Wat Khamet Kao), Khuang Pao subdistrict
- Wat Phra That Si Chom Thong, Ban Luang subdistrict
- Wat Sop Soi (Wat Mae Soi), Mae Soi subdistrict

==== Doi Lo district ====
- Wat Phra That Doi Noi (Wat Chunlakiri), Doi Lo subdistrict

==== Doi Saket district ====
- Wat Bo Sang, Ton Pao subdistrict
- Wat Pan Lang, Samran Rat subdistrict
- Wat Phra That Doi Saket, Choeng Doi subdistrict
- Wat Phra That Doi Ku Kruba Srivichai (Wat Doi Ku), Choeng Doi subdistrict

==== Doi Tao district ====
- Wat Phra Borommathat Doi Koeng, Tha Duea subdistrict
- Wat Phra Phutthabat Tamo, Pong Thung subdistrict

==== Hang Dong district ====
- Wat Doi Pao, Nong Khwai subdistrict
- Wat Thong Siri (Wat Mae Khanin Nuea), Ban Pong subdistrict
- Wat Phra That Doi Tham, Nam Phrae Subdistrict, Nam Phrae subdistrict
- Wat Wiang Dong, Nam Phrae subdistrict

==== Hot district ====
- Wat Phrabat Kaew Khao, Hot subdistrict
- Wat Phra Chao Tho, Hot subdistrict
- Wat Phra That Chedi Noi, Hot subdistrict

==== Galyani Vadhana district ====
- Wat Chan, Ban Chan subdistrict

==== Mae Ai district ====
- Wat Phra That Sop Fang, Mae Na Wang subdistrict
- Wat Tha Ton (Wat Phra That Chom Khiri Si Ping Khok Tha Ton Chai), Than To subdistrict

==== Mae On district ====
- Wat Phra That Doi Pha Tang, On Klang subdistrict
- Wat Si Bun Rueang, Mae Tha subdistrict
- Wat Tham Mueang On, Ban Sahakon subdistrict

==== Mae Rim district ====
- Wat Phra Nob Khon Muang, Don Kaeo subdistrict
- Wat Phra Phutthabat Si Roi, Saluang subdistrict
- Wat Saluang Nai, Saluang subdistrict

==== Mae Taeng district ====
- Wat Don Chiang, Sop Poeng subdistrict
- Wat Nong Kai, San Pa Yang subdistrict
- Wat Mae Khachan, Khilek subdistrict
- Wat Pa Chi, Inthakhin subdistrict
- Wat Pra That Doi Chom Chaeng, Khilek subdistrict
- Wat Phra That Srivichai (Wat Phra That Chom Nguet), Mae Taeng subdistrict
- Wat Rampoeng, Khilek subdistrict
- Wat Sop Poeng, Sop Poeng subdistrict

==== Mae Wang district ====
- Wat Luang Khun Win, Mae Win subdistrict
- Wat Phra That Si Somdet Phra Phutthachinwong (Wat Doi That, Wat Phra That Mae Tian), Mae Win subdistrict

==== Mueang Chiang Mai district ====
- Siwichai Road (Doi Suthep Road)
- Wat Anagami, Suthep subdistrict
- Wat Chiang Man, Si Phum subdistrict
- Wat Chiang Yuen, Si Phum Subdistrict
- Wat Dap Phai, Si Phum subdistrict
- Wat Doi Kaeo, Mae Hia subdistrict
- Wat Dok Kham, Si Phum subdistrict
- Wat Dok Ueang, Si Phum subdistrict (Kruba Srivichai advised Khruba Inta regarding the construction of the vihara roof)
- Wat Fon Soi, Phra Sing subdistrict
- Wat Ku Tao, Si Phum subdistrict
- Wat Kao Tue, Suthep subdistrict (now part of Wat Suan Dok)
- Wat Ket Karam, Wat Ket subdistrict
- Wat Lam Chang, Si Phum subdistrict,
- Wat Pa Daeng, Suthep subdistrict
- Wat Prasat, Si Phum subdistrict
- Wat Pha Lat, Suthep subdistric
- Wat Phra Chao Mengrai, Phra Sing subdistrict
- Wat Phra Singh, Phra Sing subdistrict
- Wat Phra That Doi Kham, Mae Hia subdistrict
- Wat Phra That Doi Suthep, Suthep subdistrict
- Wat Saen Fang, Chang Moi subdistrict
- Wat Sri Soda, Suthep subdistrict
- Wat Suan Dok, Suthep subdistrict
- Wat Ton Pin, Mae Hia subdistrict
- Wat Uppakut, Chang Moi subdistrict

==== Phrao district ====
- Wat Phra That Doi Chom Hin, Pa Tum subdistrict,
- Wat Phra That Klang Chai Mueang (Wat Si Kham), San Sai subdistrict
- Wat Phra That Muang Noeng, Long Khot subdistrict

==== San Kamphaeng district ====
- Wat Phra Non Mae Pu Kha (Wat Phra Pan), Ton Pao subdistrict

==== San Sai district ====
- Wat Khao Thaen Luang, San Sai Luang subdistrict
- Wat Khao Than Noi, San Sai Luang subdistrict
- Wat San Luang, San Na Meng subdistric
- Wat San Sai Luang, San Sai Luang Subdistrict

==== San Pa Tong district ====
- Wat Makham Luang (Wat Pa Kham Luang), Makham Luang subdistrict
- Wat Phrabat Yang Wit, Makhun Wan subdistrict
- Wat Thung Tum, Makhun Wan subdistrict
- Wat Si Koet (Wat Nong Yang Muen), Yu Wa subdistrict

==== Samoeng district ====
- Wat Bo Kaeo Wanaram (Wat Yang), Bo Kaeo subdistrict
- Wat Phra Borommathat Doi Pha Som, Mae Sap subdistrict
- Wat Phra That Mon Pia, Mae Sap subdistrict
- Wat Phra Borommathat Doi Pha Som, Mae Sap Subdistrict
- Wat Si Rattanawat Khiri (Wat Huai Phra Chao, Wat Mueang Bon, Wat Mueang Rae), Bo Kaeo Subdistrict,
- Wat Yang Moen, Yang Moen subdistrict

==== Saraphi district ====
- Wat Phra Non Nong Phueng, Nong Phueng subdistrict

== List of shrines and stupas containing the remains of Khruba Chao Siwichai ==
List of shrines and stupas containing the remains of Khru Ba Chao Srivichai (It is believed that there are still some that have been overlooked)

Lamphun Province

- Wat Chamdevi, Tambon Nai Mueang, Mueang Lamphun district (relics and remains)
- Wat Doi Ti, Tambon Pa Sak, Amphoe Mueang Lamphun (stored in a casket and remains (large monument))
- Wat Ban Pang, Tambon Si Wichai, Li district (consists of many parts, including relics, caskets and remains)
- Phra That Moli Si Wichai Monastery, Tambon Na Sai, Li district (relics)
- Phra Chedi Si Wichai Chom Khiri Monastery, Tambon Dong Dam, Li district (relics)
- Wat Ban Hong Luang, Tambon Ban Hong, Ban Hong district(relics)
- Wat Huai Kan, Tambon Ban Hong, Ban Hong district (relics)
- Doi Ngom (Doi Ngom, Doi Ngom), Tambon Huai Yab, Ban Thi district (relics)
- Wat Don Tong, Tambon Mae Rang, Pa Sang district (Relics)

Chiang Mai Province

- Wat Suan Dok Royal Monastery, Suthep Subdistrict, Mueang Chiang Mai District (Relics and Relics)
- Wat Muen San, Hai Ya Subdistrict, Mueang Chiang Mai District (Relics)
- Wat Chiang Man, Si Bhum Subdistrict, Mueang Chiang Mai District (Relics)
- Wat Nong Pa Krang, Nong Pa Krang Subdistrict, Mueang Chiang Mai District (Relics)
- Wat Sri Don Chai, Chang Klan Subdistrict, Mueang Chiang Mai District (Relics)
- Wat Phra That Doi Suthep Ratchaworawihan, Suthep Subdistrict, Mueang Chiang Mai District (Relics)
- Replica Ashoka Pillar Near the monument of Kruba Sriwichai, Suthep Subdistrict, Mueang Chiang Mai District
- Wat Tha Champee, Thung Satok Subdistrict, San Pa Tong District (relics shrine)
- Wat Phra Bat Yang Whee, Makhun Wan Subdistrict, San Pa Tong District (sarup)
- Wat Pa Ngae Walukaram, Talat Khwan Subdistrict, Doi Saket District (relics shrine)
- Wat Phra That Doi Ku, Cheng Doi Subdistrict, Doi Saket District (relics shrine)
- Wat Khao Taen Noi San Sai Luang Subdistrict, San Sai District (Relics)
- Wat Phra Phutthabat Si Roi, Saluang Subdistrict, Mae Rim District (Relics and Relics)
- Wat Phra That Klang Jai Muang (Wat Sri Kham), San Sai Subdistrict, Phrao District (Relics)
- Wat Tham Muang On, Sahakorn Subdistrict, Mae On District (Relics)
- Wat Sri Don Moon, Chomphu Subdistrict, Saraphi District (Relics)
- Wat Phra Non Mae Pu Kha, Ton Pao Subdistrict, San Kamphaeng District (Relics, Relics and Relics)

Lampang Province

- Wat Phra Kaew Don Tao Suchada Ram, Wiang Nuea Subdistrict, Mueang Lampang District (Kept in a Jar, Originally in a Container)
- Wat Phra Bat, Phra Bat Subdistrict, Mueang Lampang District (Container)
- Wat Phra That Doi Noi, Tha Pha Subdistrict, Ko Kha District (Relics Shrine)
- Wat Phra That Doi Sang, Chae Son Subdistrict, Mueang Pan District (Container)

Chiang Rai Province

- Wat Phra Maha Chinthat Chao Doi Tung, Tambon Huai Khrai, Amphoe Mae Sai (kept in a box under the sarapu and sarapu)
- Wat Sala Cheing Doi, Tambon Huai Khrai, Amphoe Mae Sai (sarapu (large monument))
- Wat Charoen Mueang, Tambon Charoen Mueang, Amphoe Phan (cemetery)
- Wat Pa Sak Nuea, Tambon Mae Yen, Amphoe Phan (sarapu)
- Wat Doi Ku, Tambon Pa Sang, Amphoe Wiang Chiang Rung (cemetery)
- Wat Si Chum Pracha, Tambon Pa Daet, Amphoe Pa Daet (sarapu (large monument))
- Wat Pa Bong Luang, Tambon Chan Chawa Tai, Amphoe Mae Chan (sarapu)
- Wat Mae Phrik, Tambon Mae Phrik, Amphoe Mae Suai (cemetery)

Phayao Province

- Wat Sri Komkham (Wat Phra Chao Ton Luang) Tambon Wiang, Mueang Phayao District (Relics Shrine)
- Wat Phra That Chom Thong Tambon Wiang, Mueang Phayao District (Sarup)
- Wat Photharam (Wat Si Thoi) Tambon Si Thoi, Mae Chai District (Relics Shrine)
- Wat Sri Mueang Mun Tambon Pa Sang, Dok Kham Tai District (Sarup)
- Wat Don Tan Tambon Huai Lan, Dok Kham Tai District (Sarup)
- Wat Phra That Saeng Kaew Mongkhon Tambon San Khong, Dok Kham Tai District (Relics Shrine and Relics Shrine)
- Wat Bunyot Tambon Don Si Chum, Dok Kham Tai District (Sarup)
- Phra That Si Rattana Sudaram Monastery, Tambon Huai Khao Kam, Chun District (Relics Shrine)
- Wat Phra That Phu Kwang Tambon Huai Kaew, Phu Kham Yao District (Sarup)

Phrae Province

- Wat Phra That Cho Hae, Cho Hae Subdistrict, Mueang Phrae District (Relics and Relics)

Mae Hong Son Province

- Wat Nam Hu (Nam Ok Ru), Wiang Tai Subdistrict, Pai District (Relics)
- Wat Thung Pong, Thung Yao Subdistrict, Pai District (Relics and Relics in a Casket

Sukhothai Province

- Wat Klang Dong, Klang Dong Subdistrict, Thung Saliam District (Relics)

== Important places related to Khruba Siwichai ==
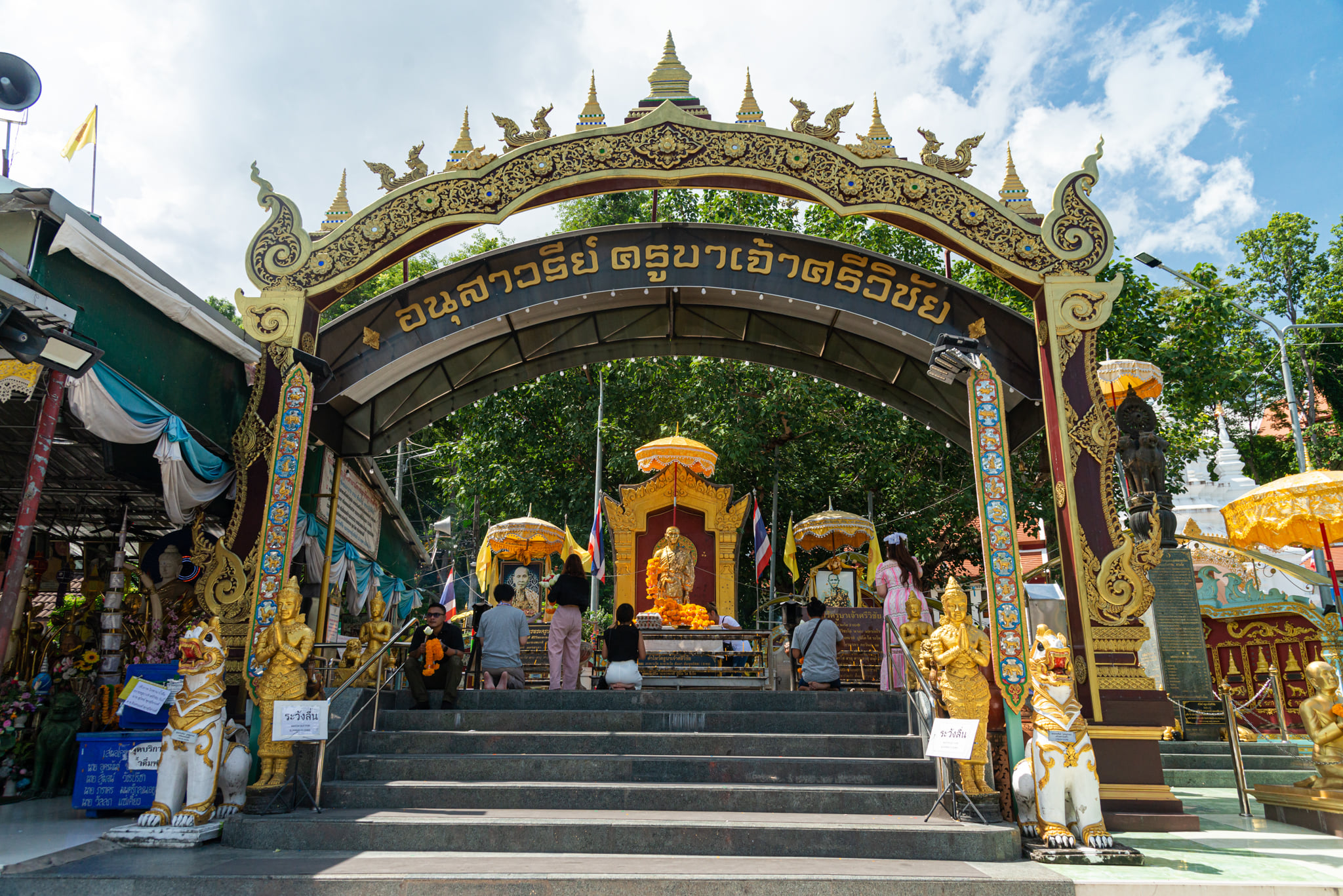
Monument of Khrubasriwichai, on the way up to Doi Suthep

- Monument of Khrubasriwichai, on the way up to Doi Suthep, Mueang Chiang Mai District, Chiang Mai Province
- Monument of Khrubasriwichai, inside Wat Doi Ti, Mueang Lamphun District, Lamphun Province
- Siwichai Road, Mueang Chiang Mai District, Chiang Mai Province
- Monument of Khrubasriwichai, Bodindecha (Sing Singhaseni) School 4
