= Nong Pla Sawai =

Coordinates: 18.337635°N 98.709069°E

Nong Pla Sawai หนองปลาสะวาย
- Subdistrict
- Interactive map of Nong Pla Sawai
- Country: Thailand
- Province: Lamphun
- District: Ban Hong District

Population (2005)
  - Total: 4,081
- Time zone: UTC+7 (ICT)

Nong Pla Sawai (Thai: หนองปลาสะวาย, pronounced [nɔ̌ːŋ plāː sā.wāːj]) is a village and tambon (subdistrict) of Ban Hong District, in Lamphun Province, Thailand. In 2005 it had a population of 4081 people. The tambon contains eight villages.
