= Nong Chang Khuen =

Coordinates: 18.655276°N 99.017931°E

Nong Chang Khuen หนองช้างคืน
- Subdistrict
- Interactive map of Nong Chang Khuen
- Country: Thailand
- Province: Lamphun
- District: Mueang Lamphun

Population (2005)
  - Total: 3,925
- Time zone: UTC+7 (ICT)

Nong Chang Khuen (Thai: หนองช้างคืน, pronounced [nɔ̌ːŋ t͡ɕʰáːŋ kʰɯ̄ːn]) is a village and tambon (sub-district) of Mueang Lamphun District, in Lamphun Province, Thailand. In 2005 it had a population of 3925 people. The tambon contains six villages.
