= Si Tia =

Si Tia ศรีเตี้ย
- Subdistrict
- Country: Thailand
- Province: Lamphun
- District: Ban Hong District

Population (2005)
  - Total: 6,031
- Time zone: UTC+7 (ICT)

Si Tia (Thai: ศรีเตี้ย, pronounced [sǐː tîa̯]) is a village and tambon (subdistrict) of Ban Hong District, in Lamphun Province, Thailand. In 2005 it had a population of 6031 people. The tambon contains nine villages.
