= Ban Paen =

Ban Paen บ้านแป้น
- Subdistrict
- Country: Thailand
- Province: Lamphun
- District: Mueang Lamphun

Population (2005)
  - Total: 6,445
- Time zone: UTC+7 (ICT)

Ban Paen (Thai: บ้านแป้น, pronounced [bâːn pɛ̂ːn]) is a village and tambon (sub-district) of Mueang Lamphun District, in Lamphun Province, Thailand. In 2005, it had a population of 6,445 people. The tambon contains nine villages.
