= Ban Thi subdistrict =

Ban Thi บ้านธิ
- Subdistrict
- Country: Thailand
- Province: Lamphun
- District: Ban Thi

Population (2005)
  - Total: 6,234
- Time zone: UTC+7 (ICT)
- Website: www.banthi.go.th

Ban Thi (Thai: บ้านธิ, pronounced [bâːn tʰíʔ]) is a tambon in Ban Thi District, Lamphun Province, northern Thailand. It lies about 20 km northeast of the town of Lamphun.

== History ==
Ban Thi was settled largely by Tai Lue people who emigrated from Xishuangbanna in Yunnan Province in the early-Rattanakosin era. Tai Lue women are known for their woven fabrics, a staple of the community economy.
