= Makhuea Chae =

Makhuea Chae มะเขือแจ้
- Subdistrict
- Country: Thailand
- Province: Lamphun
- District: Mueang Lamphun

Population (2005)
  - Total: 15,249
- Time zone: UTC+7 (ICT)

Makhuea Chae (Thai: มะเขือแจ้, pronounced [mā.kʰɯ̌a̯ t͡ɕɛ̂ː]) is a village and tambon (sub-district) of Mueang Lamphun District, in Lamphun Province, Thailand. In 2005 it had a population of 15,249. The tambon contains 20 villages.
