= Ban Klang =

Ban Klang may refer to several places in Thailand:

- Ban Klang, San Pa Tong - Chiang Mai Province, Northern Thailand
- Ban Klang, Song - Phrae Province, Northern Thailand
- Ban Klang, Wang Thong - Phitsanulok Province, CentralThailand
- Ban Klang, Mueang Lamphun - Lamphun Province, Northern Thailand
- Ban Klang, Lom Sak - Phetchabun Province, Central Thailand
- Ban Klang, Mueang Pathum Thani - Pathum Thani Province, Central Thailand
- Ban Klang, Mueang Nakhon Phanom - Nakhon Phanom Province, North-Eastern Thailand
- Ban Klang, Ao Luek - Krabi Province, Southern Thailand
- Ban Klang, Panare - Pattani Province, Southern Thailand
