= Nong Nam =

Coordinates: 18.503851°N 98.988484°E

Nong Nam หนองหนาม
- Subdistrict
- Interactive map of Nong Nam
- Country: Thailand
- Province: Lamphun
- District: Mueang Lamphun

Population (2005)
  - Total: 4,876
- Time zone: UTC+7 (ICT)

Nong Nam (Thai: หนองหนาม, pronounced [nɔ̌ːŋ nǎːm]) is a village and tambon (subdistrict) of Mueang Lamphun District, in Lamphun Province, Thailand. In 2005 it had a population of 4,876 people. The tambon contains eight villages.
