= Rim Ping =

Rim Ping ริมปิง
- Subdistrict
- Country: Thailand
- Province: Lamphun
- District: Mueang Lamphun

Population (2005)
  - Total: 7,078
- Time zone: UTC+7 (ICT)

Rim Ping (Thai: ริมปิง, pronounced [rīm pīŋ]) is a village and tambon (sub-district) of Mueang Lamphun District, in Lamphun Province, Thailand. In 2005 it had a total population of 7078 people. The tambon contains 10 villages.
