= Si Bua Ban =

Si Bua Ban ศรีบัวบาน
- Subdistrict
- Country: Thailand
- Province: Lamphun
- District: Mueang Lamphun

Population (2005)
  - Total: 9,010
- Time zone: UTC+7 (ICT)

Si Bua Ban (Thai: ศรีบัวบาน, pronounced [sǐː būa̯ bāːn]) is a village and tambon (sub-district) of Mueang Lamphun District, in Lamphun Province, Thailand. In 2005 it had a population of 9,010 people. The tambon contains 12 villages.
