= Wat Prasat =

Wat Prasat may refer to several Buddhist temples in Thailand:

- Wat Prasat, Mueang Chiang Mai
- Wat Prasat, Nonthaburi
