= Lao Yao =

Coordinates: 18°22′N 98°47′E

Lao Yao เหล่ายาว
- Subdistrict
- Interactive map of Lao Yao
- Country: Thailand
- Province: Lamphun
- District: Ban Hong District

Population (2005)
  - Total: 9,641
- Time zone: UTC+7 (ICT)

Lao Yao (Thai: เหล่ายาว, pronounced [làw jāːw]) is a village and tambon (subdistrict) of Ban Hong District, in Lamphun Province, Thailand. In 2005 it had a population of 9641 people. The tambon contains 12 villages.
