= Mueang Chi =

Mueang Chi เหมืองจี้
- Subdistrict
- Country: Thailand
- Province: Lamphun
- District: Mueang Lamphun

Population (2005)
  - Total: 9,298
- Time zone: UTC+7 (ICT)

Mueang Chi (Thai: เหมืองจี้, pronounced [mɯ̌a̯ŋ t͡ɕîː]) is a village and tambon (subdistrict) of Mueang Lamphun District, in Lamphun Province, Thailand. In 2005 it had a population of 9298 people. The tambon contains 14 villages.
