= Ban Klang, Lamphun =

Ban Klang บ้านกลาง
- Subdistrict
- Interactive map of Ban Klang
- Coordinates: 18.579082°N 99.068678°E
- Country: Thailand
- Province: Lamphun
- District: Mueang Lamphun

Population (2005)
  - Total: 8,195
- Time zone: UTC+7 (ICT)

Ban Klang (Thai: บ้านกลาง, pronounced [bâːn klāːŋ]) is a village and tambon (sub-district) of Mueang Lamphun District, in Lamphun Province, Thailand. In 2005, it had a population of 8,195 people. The tambon contains 12 villages.
