= Mueang Nga =

- Subdistrict
- Location within Thailand
- Coordinates: 18°35′59″N 99°1′5″E
- Country: Thailand
- Province: Lamphun
- District: Mueang Lamphun

Population (2005)
  - Total: 14,067
- Time zone: UTC+7 (ICT)

Mueang Nga (Thai: เหมืองง่า, pronounced [mɯ̌a̯ŋ ŋâː]) is a village and tambon (sub-district) of Mueang Lamphun District, in Lamphun Province, Thailand. In 2005 it had a population of 14,067 people. The tambon contains 10 villages.
