= Huai Yap =

Huai Yap ห้วยยาบ
- Subdistrict
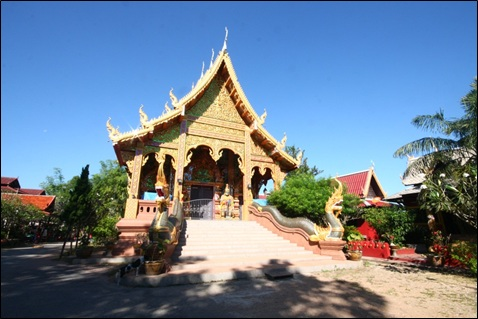
- Wat Payang
- Country: Thailand
- Province: Lamphun
- District: Ban Thi District

Population (2005)
  - Total: 8,111
- Time zone: UTC+7 (ICT)

Huai Yap (Thai: ห้วยยาบ, pronounced [hûa̯j jâːp]) is a village and tambon (subdistrict) of Ban Thi District, in Lamphun Province, Thailand. In 2005, it had a population of 8,111 people. The tambon contains 15 villages.
