= Ban Hong subdistrict =

Ban Hong บ้านโฮ่ง
- Subdistrict
- Interactive map of Ban Hong
- Coordinates: 18.331105°N 98.819056°E
- Country: Thailand
- Province: Lamphun
- District: Ban Hong District

Population (2005)
  - Total: 15,186
- Time zone: UTC+7 (ICT)

Ban Hong (Thai: บ้านโฮ่ง, pronounced [bâːn hôːŋ]) is a village and tambon (subdistrict) of Ban Hong District, in Lamphun Province, Thailand. In 2005, it had a population of 15186 people. The tambon contains 18 villages.
