= Wiang Yong =

Wiang Yong เวียงยอง
- Subdistrict
- Interactive map of Wiang Yong
- Country: Thailand
- Province: Lamphun
- District: Mueang Lamphun

Population (2005)
  - Total: 6,096
- Time zone: UTC+7 (ICT)

Wiang Yong (Thai: เวียงยอง, pronounced [wīa̯ŋ jɔ̄ːŋ]) is a village and tambon (sub-district) of Mueang Lamphun District, in Lamphun Province, Thailand. In 2005 it had a population of 6,096 people. The tambon contains eight villages.
