= Pratu Pa =

Pratu Pa ประตูป่า
- Subdistrict
- Country: Thailand
- Province: Lamphun
- District: Mueang Lamphun

Population (2005)
  - Total: 5,832
- Time zone: UTC+7 (ICT)

Pratu Pa (Thai: ประตูป่า, pronounced [prā.tūː pàː]) is a village and tambon (sub-district) of Mueang Lamphun District, in Lamphun Province, Thailand. In 2005 it had a population of 5832 people. The tambon contains nine villages.
