= Ton Thong =

Ton Thong ต้นธง
- Subdistrict
- Country: Thailand
- Province: Lamphun
- District: Mueang Lamphun

Population (2005)
  - Total: 10,982
- Time zone: UTC+7 (ICT)

Ton Thong (Thai: ต้นธง, pronounced [tôn tʰōŋ]) is a village and tambon (sub-district) of Mueang Lamphun District, in Lamphun Province, Thailand. In 2005 it had a population of 10982 people. The tambon contains 11 villages.
