= Pa Sak, Lamphun =

Pa Sak ป่าสัก
- Tambon
- Interactive map of Pa Sak
- Coordinates: 18°32′53″N 99°02′08″E
- Country: Thailand
- Province: Lamphun
- Amphoe: Mueang Lamphun

Population (2019)
  - Total: 14,385
- Time zone: UTC+7 (TST)
- Postal code: 51000
- TIS 1099: 510110

Pa Sak (Thai: ป่าสัก) is a tambon (subdistrict) of Mueang Lamphun District, in Lamphun Province, Thailand. In 2019 it had a total population of 14,385 people.

== Administration ==
=== Central administration ===
The tambon is subdivided into 18 administrative villages (muban).

No.	Name	Thai
1.	Ban San Khayom	บ้านสันคะยอม
2.	Ban Nong Bua	บ้านหนองบัว
3.	Ban Pa Tueng Ngam	บ้านป่าตึงงาม
4.	Ban Luk	บ้านหลุก
5.	Ban Nong Pla Kho	บ้านหนองปลาขอ
6.	Ban San Pa Sak	บ้านสันป่าสัก
7.	Ban Nam Phu	บ้านน้ำพุ
8.	Ban Huai Ma Kong	บ้านห้วยม้าโก้ง
9.	Ban Ko Pao	บ้านกอเปา
10.	Ban Nong Lum	บ้านหนองหลุม
11.	Ban Nong Tha	บ้านหนองท่า
12.	Ban San Luang	บ้านสันหลวง
13.	Ban Nong Sio	บ้านหนองซิว
14.	Ban Nong Sai	บ้านหนองไซ
15.	Ban Nam Bo Lueang	บ้านน้ำบอเหลือง
16.	Ban Sai Thong	บ้านทรายทอง
17.	Ban Mai Rong Klaep	บ้านใหม่ร่องแกลบ
18.	Ban Mai Chatuchak	บ้านใหม่จตุจักร

=== Local administration ===
The whole area of the subdistrict is covered by the subdistrict municipality (Thesaban Tambon) Pa Sak (เทศบาลตำบลป่าสัก).
