= Pa Phlu =

Coordinates: 18°14′N 98°50′E

Pa Phlu ป่าพลู
- Subdistrict
- Interactive map of Pa Phlu
- Country: Thailand
- Province: Lamphun
- District: Ban Hong District

Population (2005)
  - Total: 7,758
- Time zone: UTC+7 (ICT)

Pa Phlu (Thai: ป่าพลู, pronounced [pàː pʰlūː]) is a village and tambon (subdistrict) of Ban Hong District, in Lamphun Province, Thailand. In 2005 it had a population of 7,758 people. The tambon contains 12 villages.
