= Bai sema =

Boundary stone designating sacred area in Thai Buddhist temple

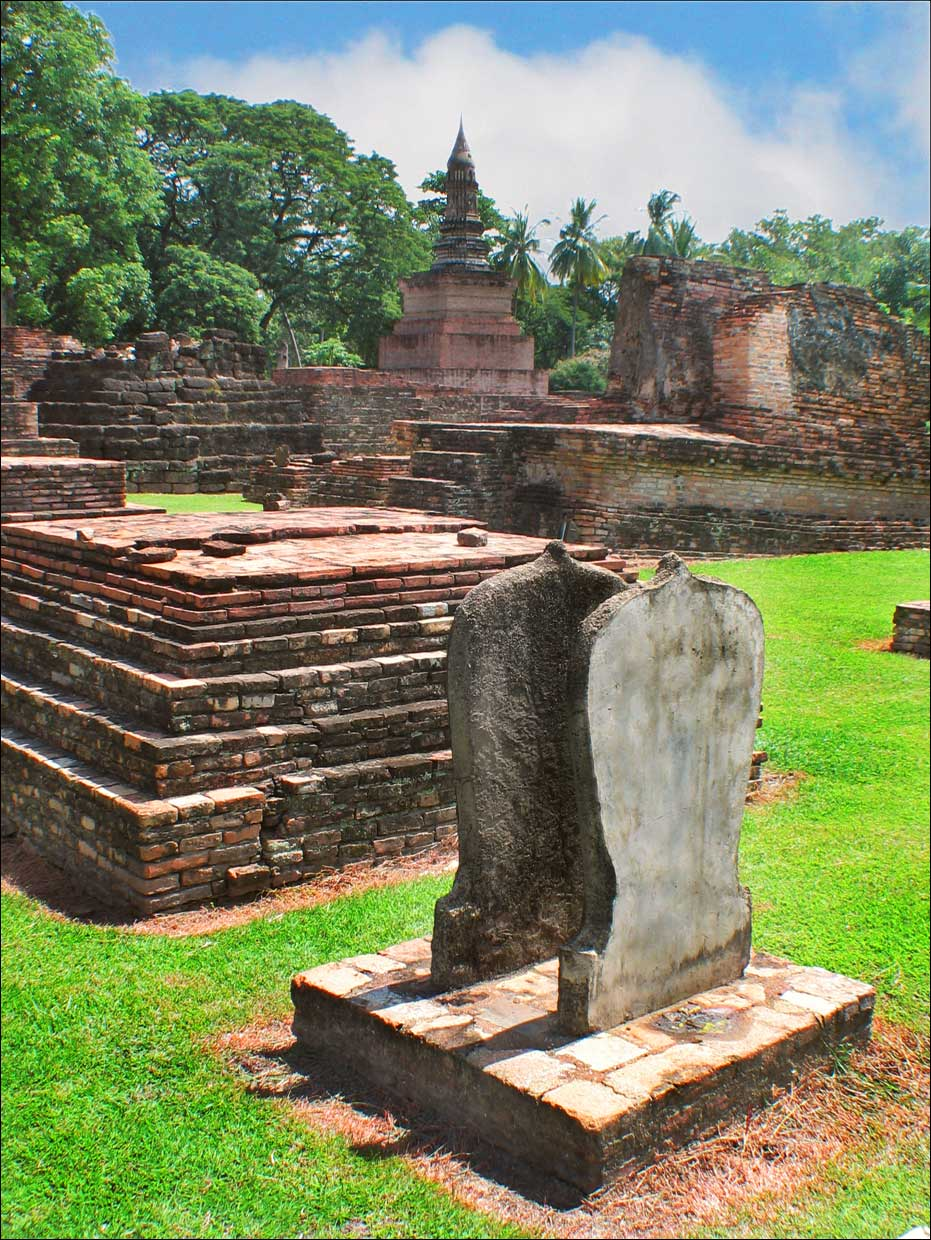
Photo 1: Bai sema at Wat Mahathat, Sukhothai Historical Park

Bai sema (Thai: ใบเสมา, pronounced [bāj sěː.māː]) are boundary stones which designate the sacred area for a phra ubosot (ordination hall) within a Thai Buddhist temple (wat); otherwise called sema hin (เสมาหิน).

== History ==
It is written in the Vinaya Pitaka that the Baddhasima (the area in which the monks perform the Sanghakamma or Buddhist sacred ceremonies) must be able to accommodate 21 seated monks, with a space the length of a forearm between each monk. The area should also not be larger than three yojana which is about 48 kilometres (30 mi). This is probably meant to mean the maximum circumference. In other words, the Baddhasima should not be too small, nor too big.

It is also written that the Baddhasima can be marked by the following Nimitta (border markers): hills, rock formations, forests, trees, ant hills, streets, rivers and other waters such as the sea or a pond. The type of Nimitta that is mainly used in Thailand is a stone. The oldest stone bai sema in Thailand were found in northeast Thailand (Isan) and are from the Dvaravati period (6th - 9th century CE).

== Placing of the bai sema ==
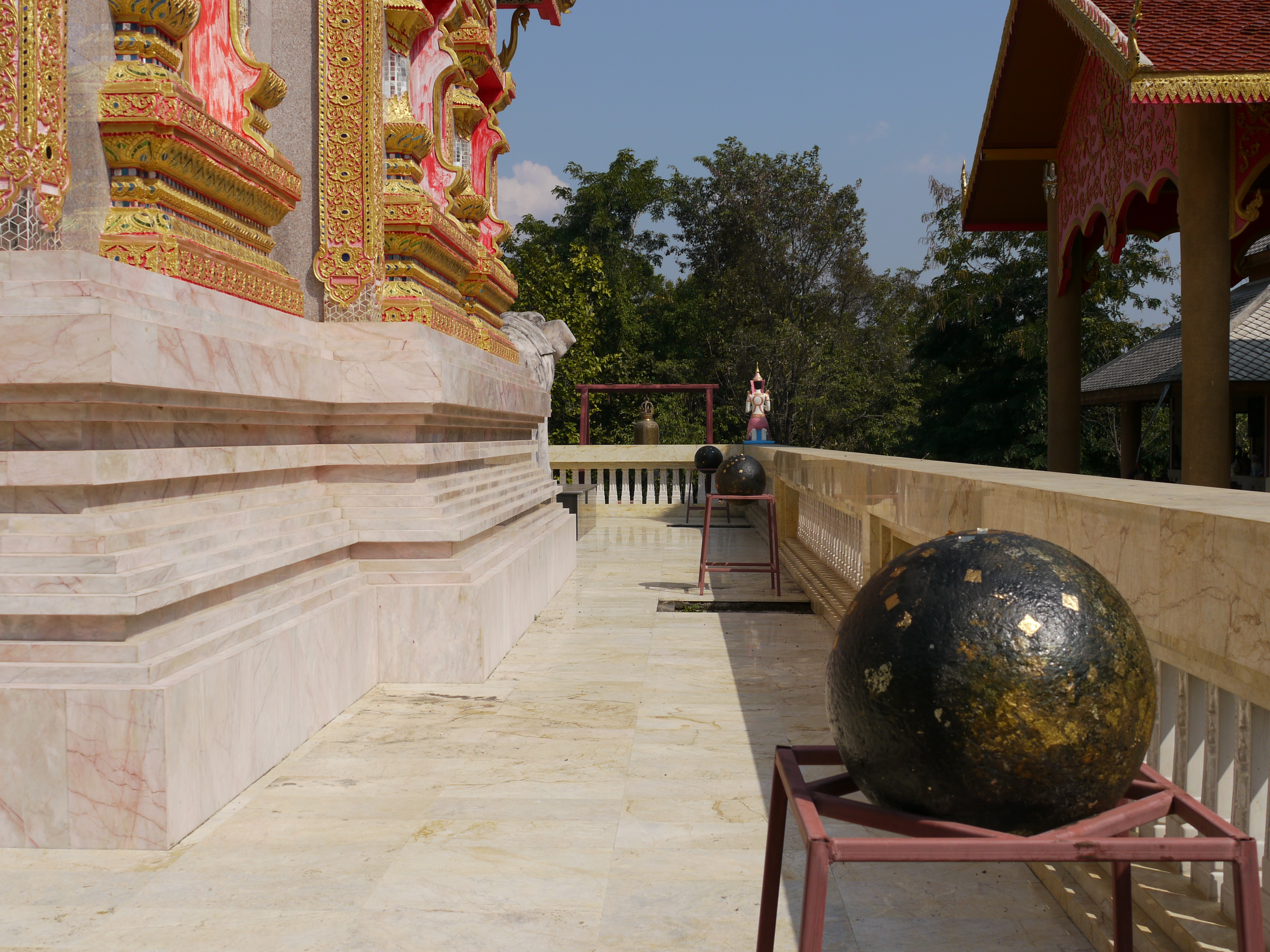
Luk Nimit next to their pits waiting for the burial ceremony.

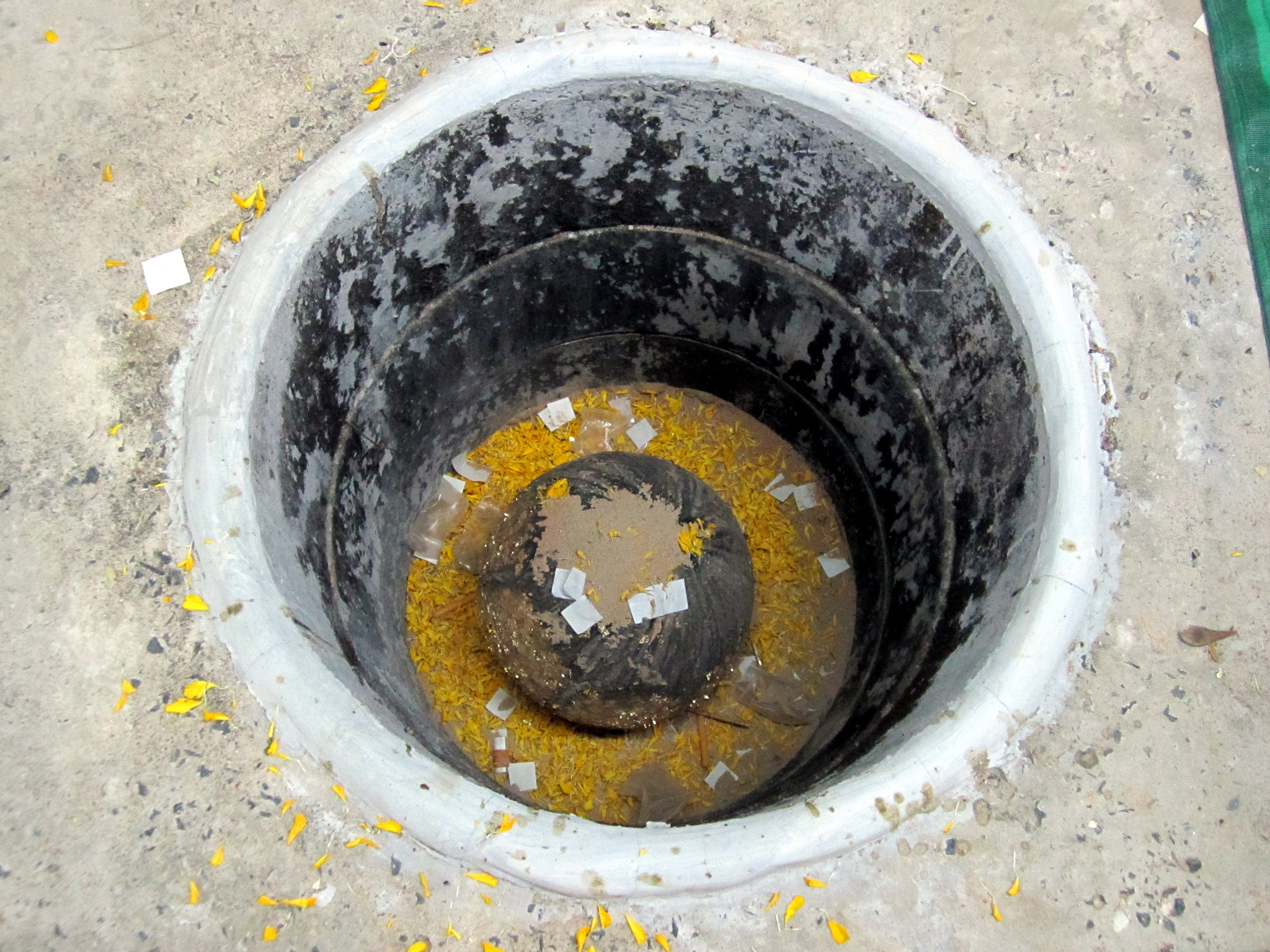
A Luk Nimit in an open, yet uncovered pit.

Before work starts on a new phra ubosot, nine holes are dug: eight at the cardinal points, the ninth beneath where the principal Buddha statue will be placed. Luk nimit (Thai: ลูกนิมิต), round stones the size of a cannonball, are placed in to these holes during a religious ceremony. Eight Sema stones are then placed over those Luk Nimit which are situated at the cardinal points. Double (or even triple) bai sema signify that the phra ubosot has been rebuilt, or consecrated for use by more than one monastic order, or that the temple has a Royal connection (photo 1).

== Description of the bai sema ==
The Thai words bai sema mean "Sema leaves" due to the shape of the flat Sema stones being somewhat akin to the shape of the leaves of the Bodhi tree, the tree under which the Buddha achieved enlightenment (photo 1).

Parts of a bai sema are described in Thailand as being body parts: "neck", "shoulders", "chest", "hips" and "stomach". During the Ayutthaya kingdom and the following Rattanakosin era, bai sema would sometimes be decorated with eyes (photo 2) and princely crowns (photo 3). The Thammayut order, which was founded by Prince Mongkut (the later King Rama IV) in 1833, developed a three-dimensional form of bai sema (photo 4).

== Gallery ==
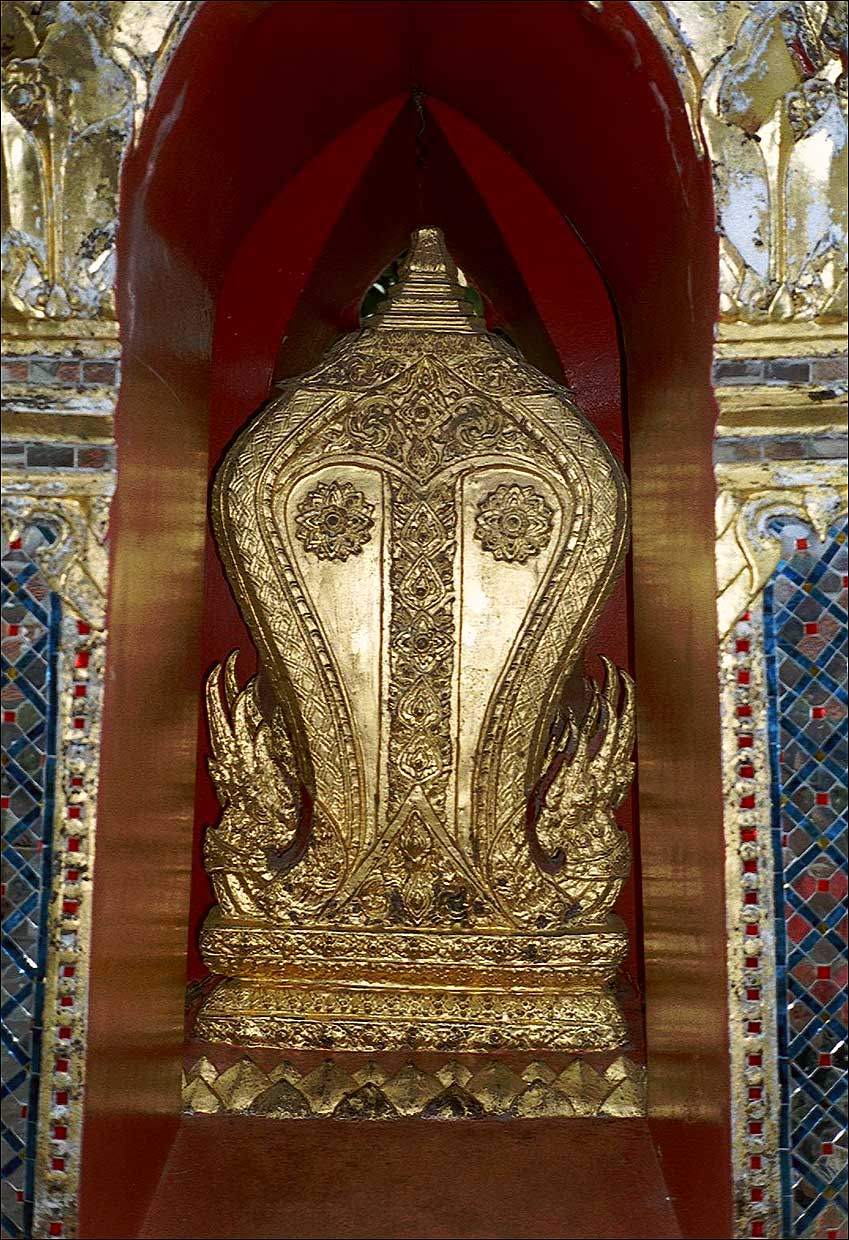
Photo 2: Bai Sema with "eyes", Wat Phra Kaeo, Bangkok

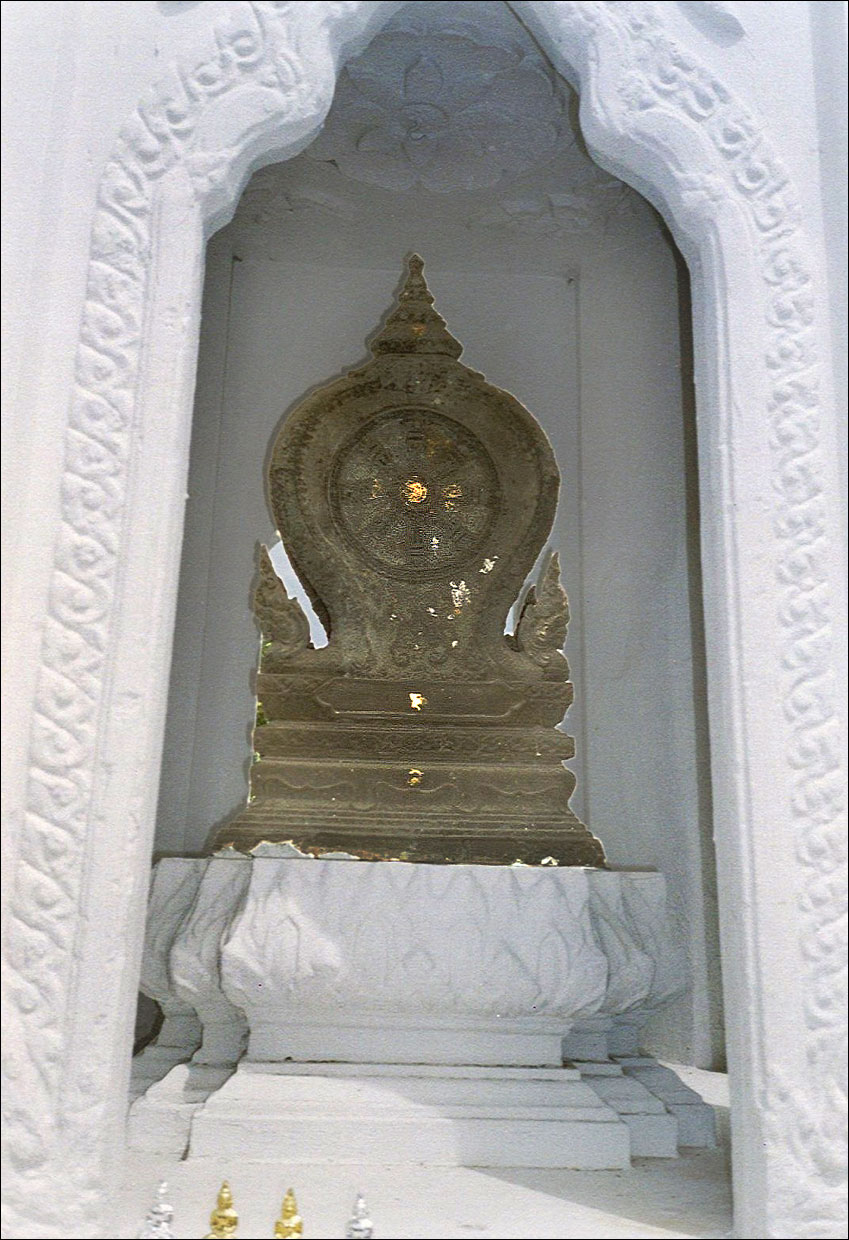
Photo 3: "crowned" Bai Sema, Wat Ratchanadda, Bangkok

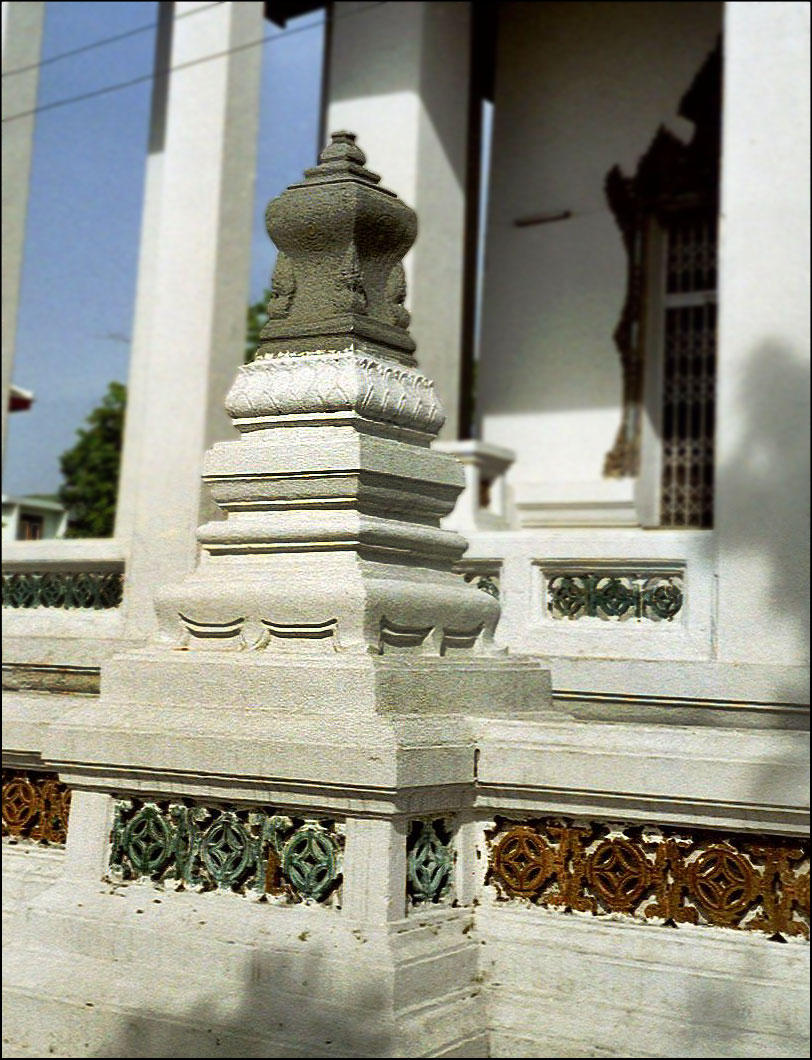
Photo 4: four sided Bai Sema, Wat Mahanaparam, Bangkok

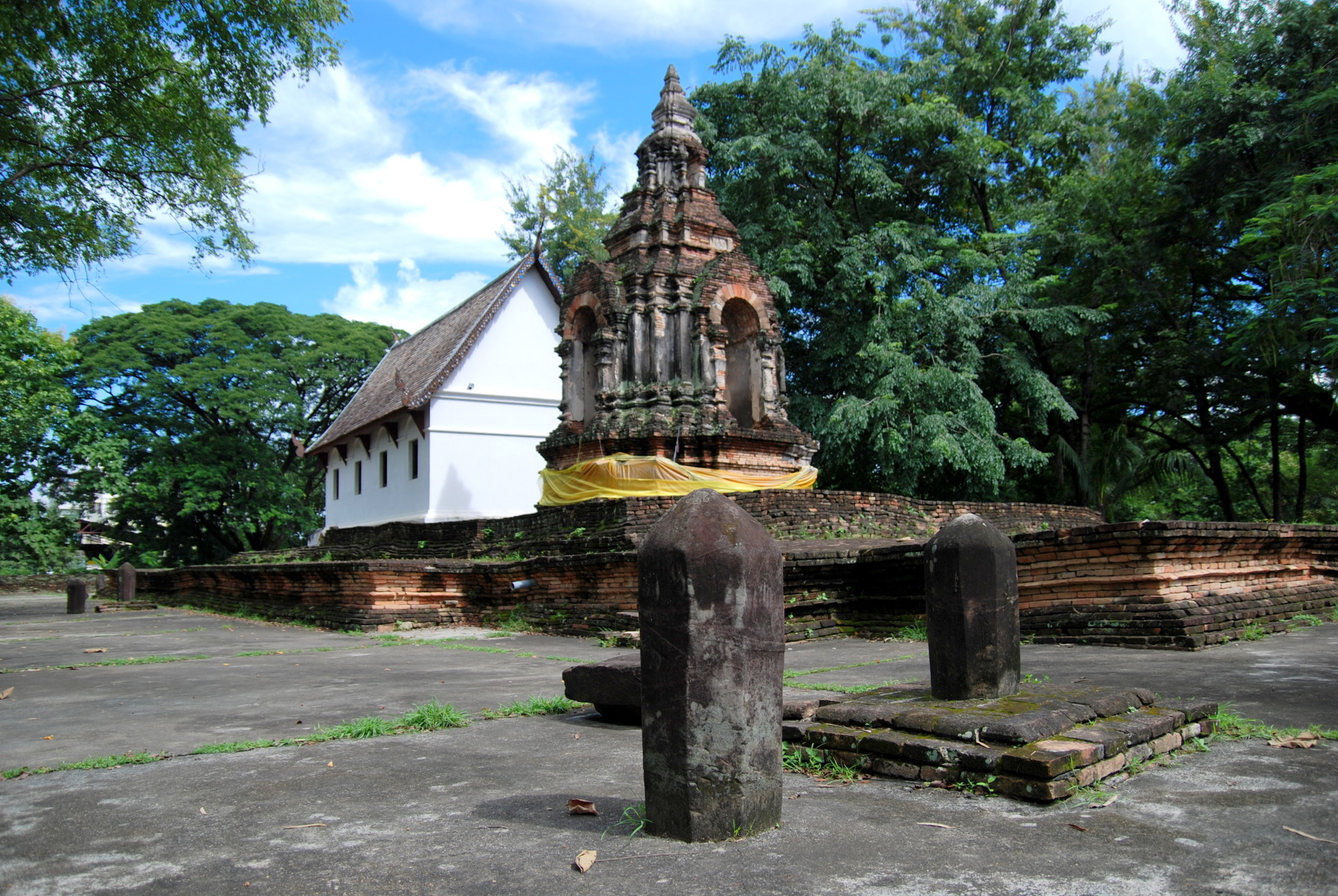
Two sets of Bai Sema surround the ubosot and a chedi at Wat Chet Yot, Chiang Mai

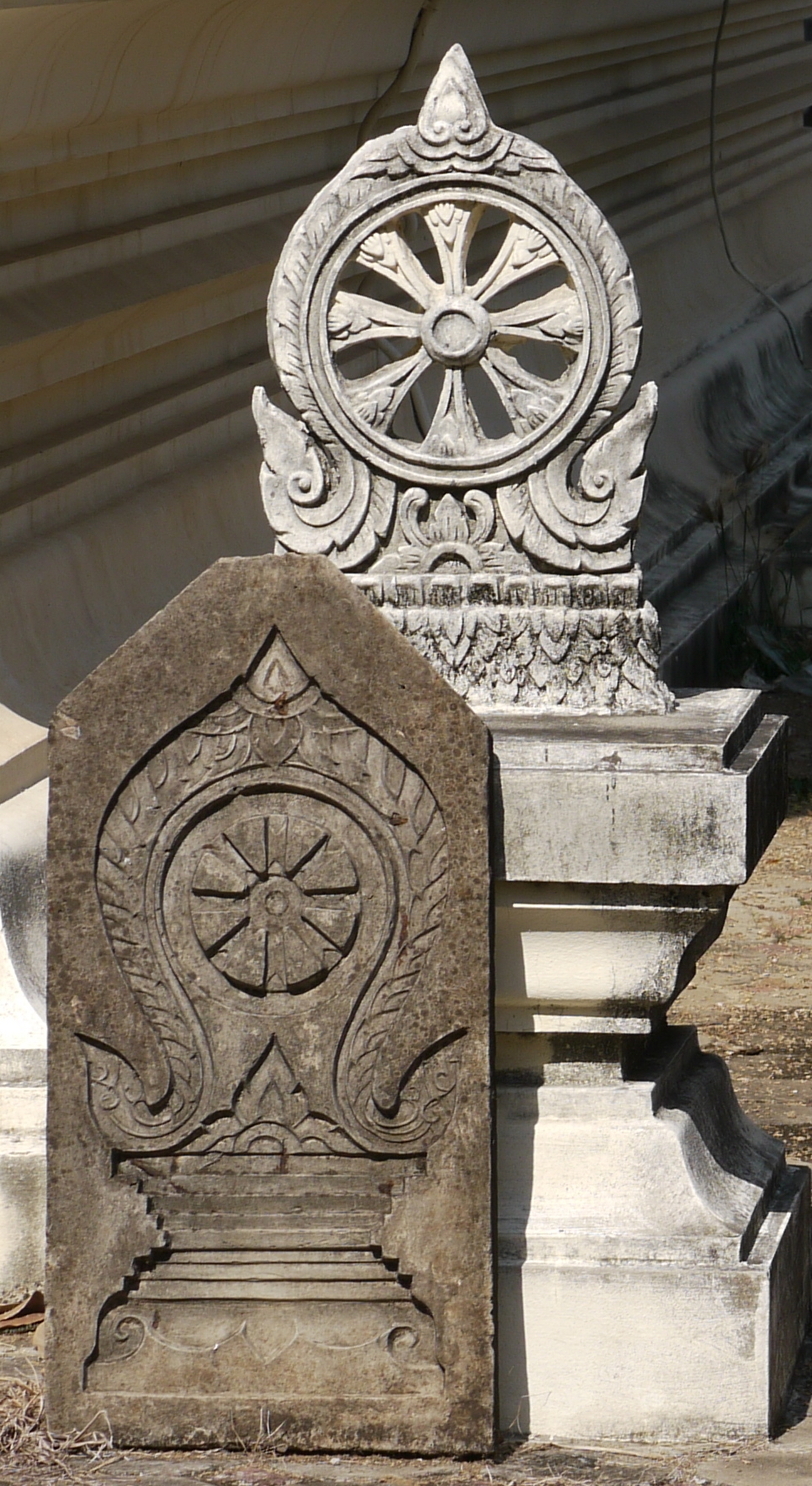
Mold for a Bai Sema, found at Wat Umong in the Umong subdistrict of Lamphun

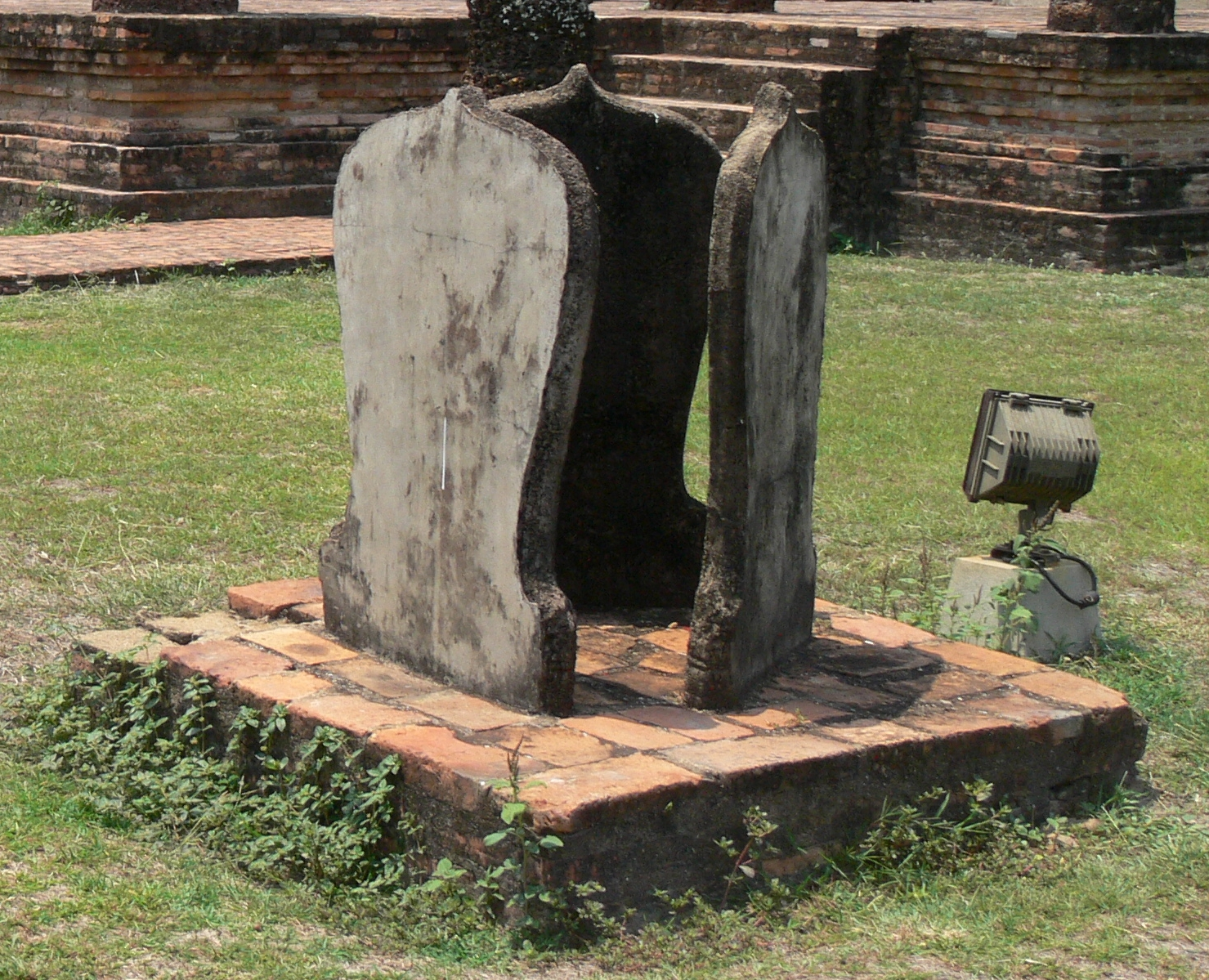
A triple Bai Sema in Sukhothai

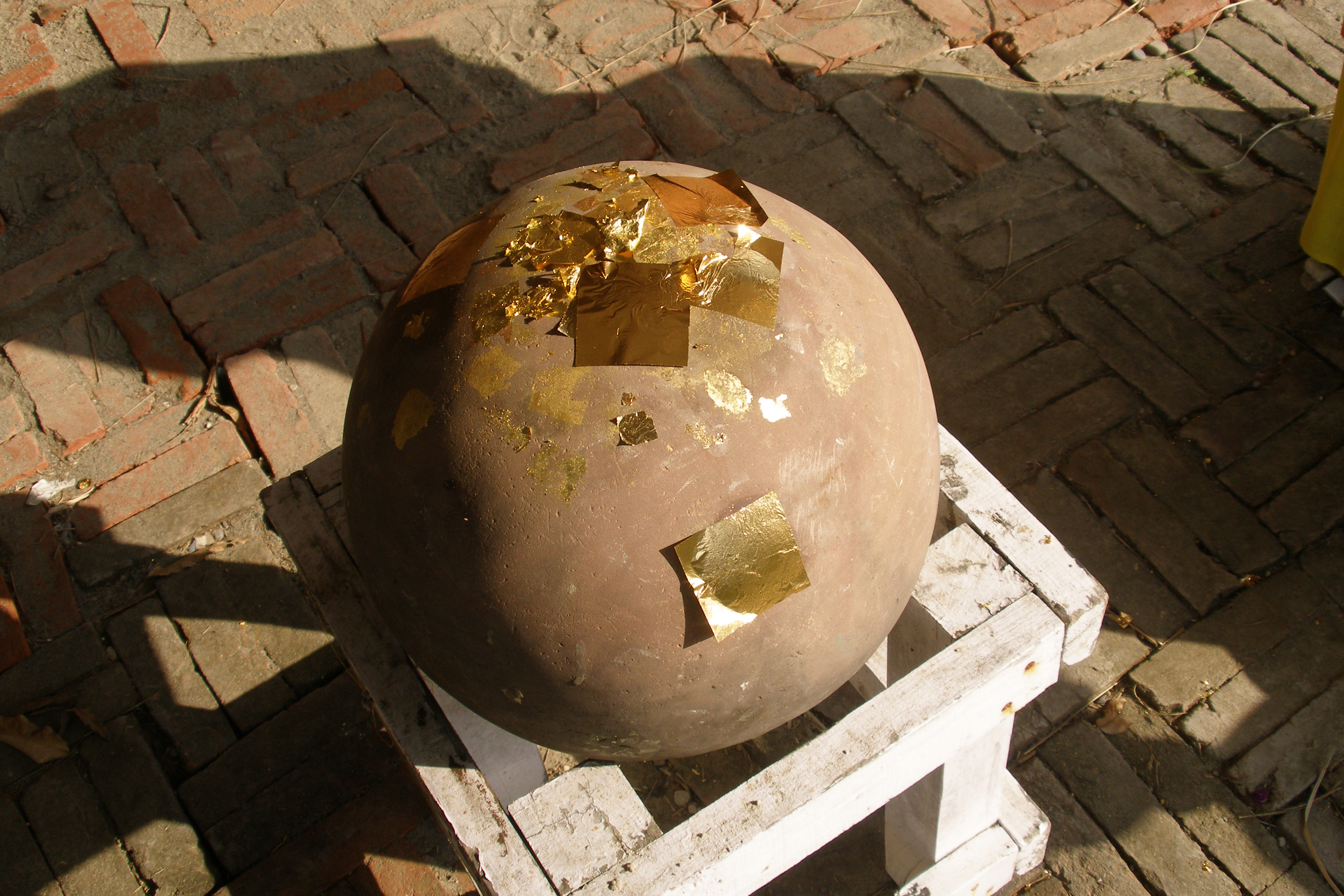
Gilding, Lumbini, Nepal

== See also ==
- Cetiya
- Uposatha
- Patimokkha
- Upasampadā
- Ordination hall
- Vihara
- Visungkhamsima
- Kyaung
- Wat

== Sources ==
- No Na Paknam: The Buddhist Boundary Markers of Thailand. Muang Boran Press, Bangkok 1981 (No ISBN, only to be had from used bookstores)
- No Na Paknam: Sima Gattha, Samut Khoi Wat Suthat Thepwararam ("Manuscript of Sima of Wat Suthat Dhepvararam"). Muang Boran Press, Bangkok 1997, ISBN 974-7367-82-3
