= Wat Phra Chao Mengrai =

Buddhist temple in Chiang Mai, Thailand

Coordinates: 18°47′07″N 98°58′55″E

- วัดพระเจ้าเม็งราย
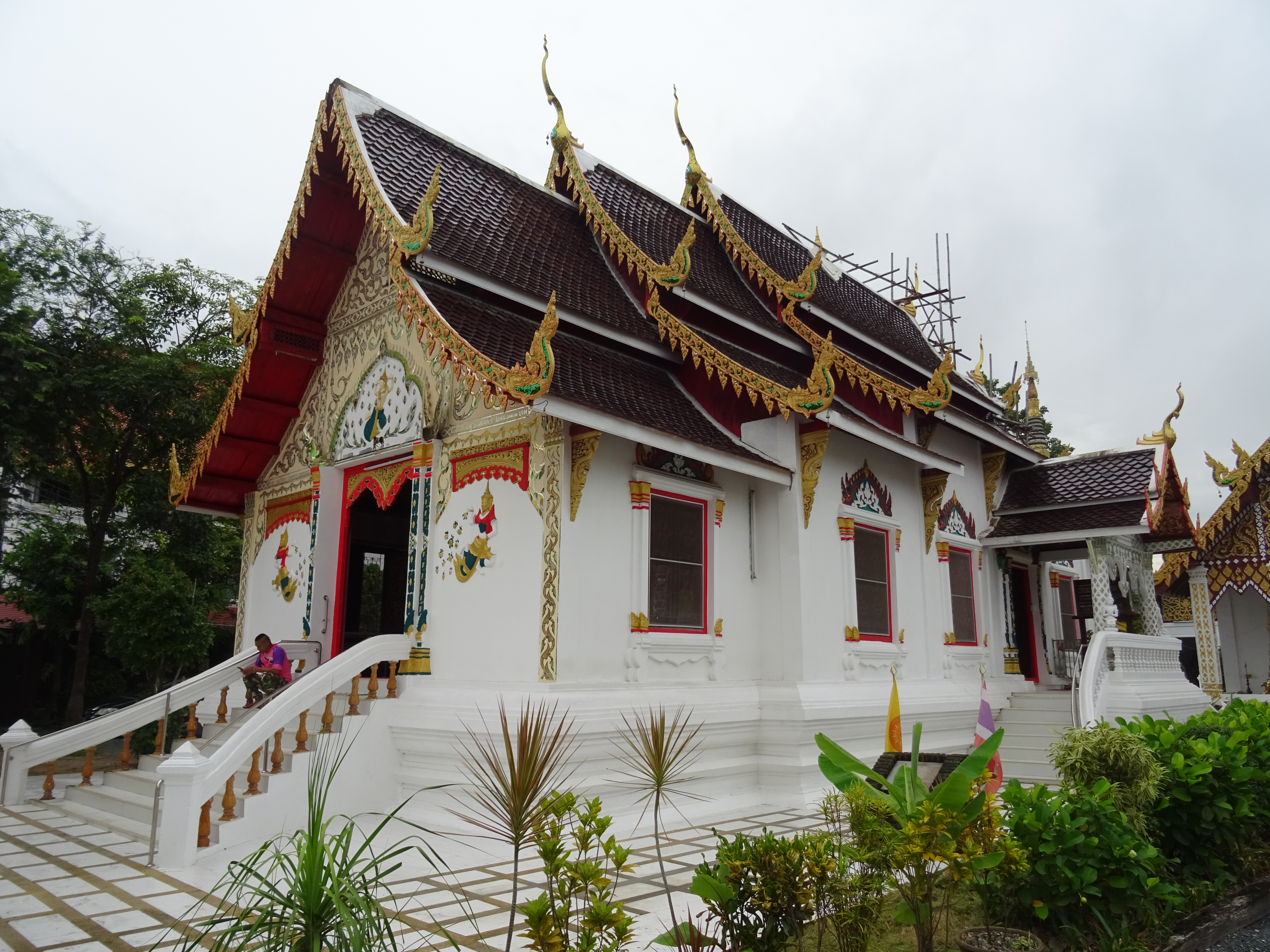

Religion
- Affiliation: Buddhism
- Sect: Therevada Buddhism, Maha Nikaya

Location
- Location: 21 Ban Phra Chao Mengrai, Ratchamanka Road, Phra Singh sub-district, Mueang Chiang Mai district, Chiang Mai
- Country: Thailand
- Interactive map of Wat Phra Chao Mengrai

Architecture
- Founder: King Mangrai
- Established: c. 1300

Wat Phra Chao Mengrai (Thai: วัดพระเจ้าเม็งราย) is a Buddhist temple in Chiang Mai, northern Thailand. Situated in the old city, the temple was established at the beginning of the 14th century by King Mangrai, the first king of Lan Na (1296–1311) and founder of Chiang Mai.

== History ==
Wat Phra Chao Mengrai, constructed during the 1300s by King Mangrai—his third temple—received royal permission for the construction of the Sema stone boundary markers in 1296, according to the National Office of Buddhism. The temple, previously known as Wat Kalakot or Wat Khan Kad changed its name to Wat Phra Chao Mengrai during the 1950s. Its original name is believed to derive from the word for the pole used to carry Buddha images. Mentioned in the Phongsawadan Yonok Chronicle, it is said that King Mangrai founded the temple at its current location after a cart carrying a Buddha image which was being transported to Wat Chiang Man broke down there and the King, regarding the mishap as an omen, decided to leave the Buddha image and to build on the spot a new temple.

== Description ==
Wat Phra Chao Mengrai consists of a ubosot; an old viharn; a new viharn; a Tripitake Hall with a library, a multi-purpose pavilion for offerings, and a square-shaped chedi with niches on each of its four sides to house Buddha images. The temple is known for its "walking" Buddha image which dates from the early 14th century and is believed to have been commissioned by King Mangrai. Cast by Chiang Saen craftsman in bronze in a walking posture, the image has its right hand extended in the abhaya mudra and stands over five metres tall. Placed in its own sala building, it is depicted wearing a stiff robe and a long shawl covering its left arm. The old viharn contains a bronze Buddha image inscribed with the equivalent date of 1470 with unusual staring eyes, and a modern replica of the Phra Buddha Sihing image.
