= Umong =

- Subdistrict
- Country: Thailand
- Province: Lamphun
- District: Mueang Lamphun
- Time zone: UTC+7 (ICT)

Umong (Thai: อุโมงค์, pronounced [ʔū.mōːŋ]) is a village and tambon (sub-district) of Mueang Lamphun District, in Lamphun Province, Thailand. In 2005 it had a population of 13,558 people. The tambon contains 11 villages.
