= Mueang Lamphun district =

Mueang Lamphun เมืองลำพูน
- District
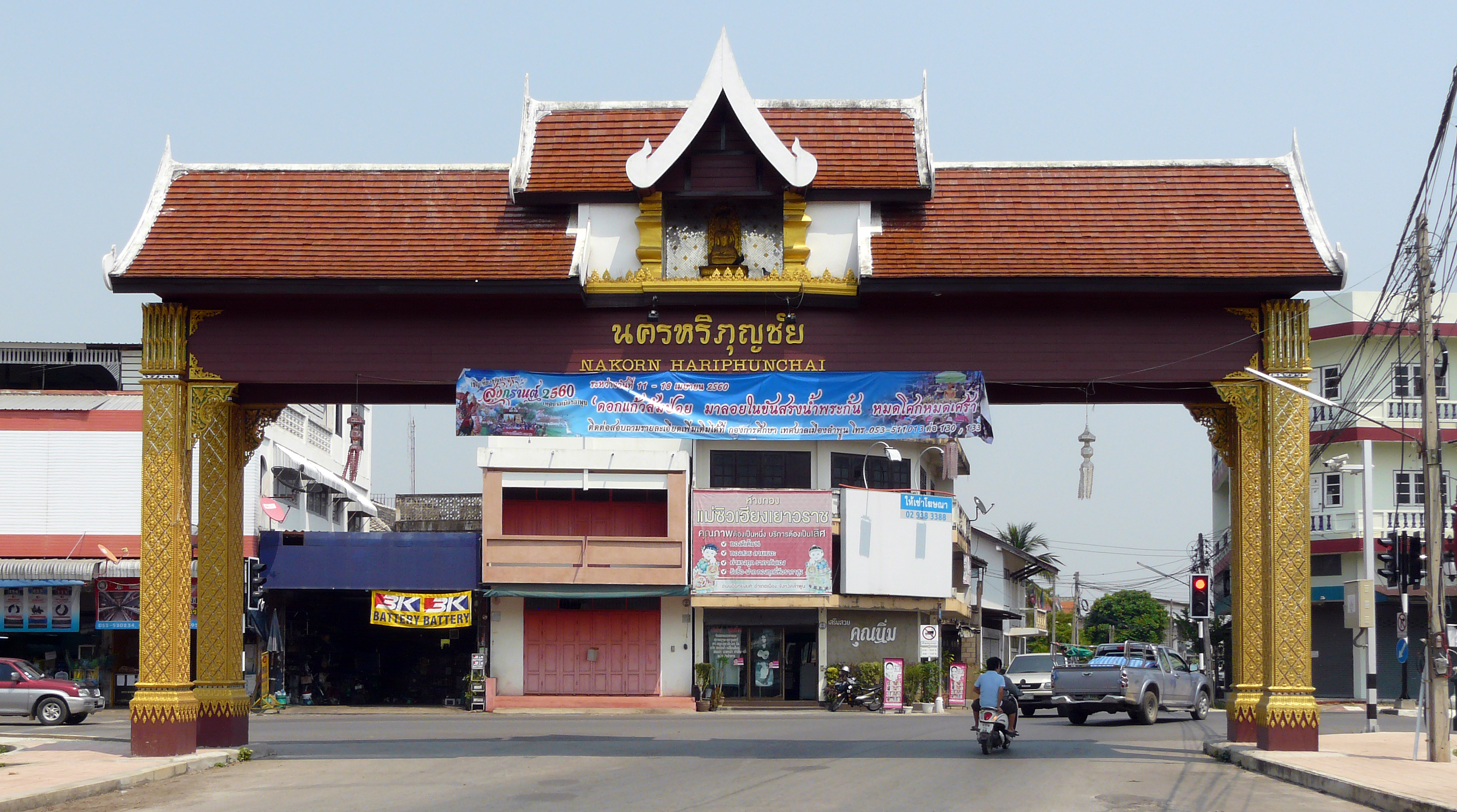
- Lamphun City Gate

- District location in Lamphun province
- Coordinates: 18°34′41″N 99°1′4″E
- Country: Thailand
- Province: Lamphun

Area
  - Total: 479.8 km^{2} (185.3 sq mi)

Population (2005)
  - Total: 140,486
  - Density: 292.8/km^{2} (758/sq mi)
- Time zone: UTC+7 (ICT)
- Postal code: 51000
- Geocode: 5101

Mueang Lamphun (Thai: เมืองลำพูน; IPA: [mɯ̄aŋ lām.pʰūːn]) is the capital district (amphoe mueang) of Lamphun province, northern Thailand.

== Geography ==
Neighboring districts are (from the south clockwise) Mae Tha and Pa Sang of Lamphun Province, San Pa Tong, Hang Dong, Saraphi of Chiang Mai province, Ban Thi of Lamphun and Mae On of Chiang Mai.

The main river of the district is the Ping River.

== Administration ==
The district is divided into 17 sub-districts (tambons), which are further subdivided into 158 villages (mubans). The town (thesaban mueang) Lamphun covers tambon Nai Mueang. There are three more sub-district municipalities (thesaban tambons): Umong and Rim Ping cover the complete same-named tambons, and Ban Paen parts of tambons Ban Paen and Nong Nam. There are a further 12 tambon administrative organizations (TAO).

| No. | Name | Thai name | Villages | Pop. |
|---|---|---|---|---|
| 1. | Nai Mueang | ในเมือง | - | 14,068 |
| 2. | Mueang Nga | เหมืองง่า | 10 | 14,067 |
| 3. | Umong | อุโมงค์ | 11 | 13,558 |
| 4. | Nong Chang Khuen | หนองช้างคืน | 6 | 3,925 |
| 5. | Pratu Pa | ประตูป่า | 9 | 5,832 |
| 6. | Rim Ping | ริมปิง | 10 | 7,088 |
| 7. | Ton Thong | ต้นธง | 11 | 10,982 |
| 8. | Ban Paen | บ้านแป้น | 9 | 6,445 |
| 9. | Mueang Chi | เหมืองจี้ | 14 | 9,298 |
| 10. | Pa Sak | ป่าสัก | 18 | 11,797 |
| 11. | Wiang Yong | เวียงยอง | 8 | 6,096 |
| 12. | Ban Klang | บ้านกลาง | 12 | 8,195 |
| 13. | Makhuea Chae | มะเขือแจ้ | 20 | 15,249 |
| 16. | Si Bua Ban | ศรีบัวบาน | 12 | 9,010 |
| 17. | Nong Nam | หนองหนาม | 8 | 4,876 |
