= Ton Pao =

Ton Pao ต้นเปา
- Tambon
- Country: Thailand
- Province: Chiang Mai
- District: San Kamphaeng

Population (2005)
  - Total: 11,006
- Time zone: UTC+7 (ICT)

Ton Pao (Thai: ต้นเปา) is a tambon (subdistrict) of San Kamphaeng District, in Chiang Mai Province, Thailand. In 2005 it had a population of 11,006 people. The tambon contains 10 villages.
