= Lamphun Airport =

Lamphun Airport สนามบินเครือสหพัฒน์ ลำพูน
- IATA: none; ICAO: VTCO

Summary
- Airport type: Public
- Owner: Sahaphatana Holding Co.
- Operator: Sahaphatana Holding Co.
- Location: Lamphun, Thailand
- Elevation AMSL: 925 ft / 282 m
- Coordinates: 18°32′40″N 99°00′59″E
- Interactive map of Lamphun Airport

Runways
Direction	Length		Surface
Direction	ft	m	Surface
01/19	1,250	700	Laterite

Lamphun Airport (IATA: VTCO) is located inside the area of the Saha Industrial Park. This airfield was designed to meet ICAO recommendations and is approved by the DOA. Lamphun Airfield, operated by the Sahaphatana Holding Co is 20 kilometres (12 mi) south on the extended centreline of runway 36 at Chiang Mai International Airport. Runway 01/19 is level, well-graded laterite surface and usable even during the wet season.

The final approach from both directions is straightforward. There are high voltage electricity pylons less than 1 km south of runway 19 and several aerial masts 1345' AMSL to the 2 km NE of airfield. There are houses and trees close to threshold of runway 01 reducing the available landing distance on this runway.
