= Ban Thi district =

Ban Thi บ้านธิ
- District
- District location in Lamphun province
- Coordinates: 18°39′6″N 99°7′30″E
- Country: Thailand
- Province: Lamphun
- Seat: Ban Thi

Area
  - Total: 129.0 km^{2} (49.8 sq mi)

Population (2005)
  - Total: 17,607
  - Density: 136.5/km^{2} (354/sq mi)
- Time zone: UTC+7 (ICT)
- Postal code: 51180
- Geocode: 5107

Ban Thi (Thai: บ้านธิ, pronounced [bâːn tʰíʔ]) is the northernmost district (amphoe) of Lamphun province, northern Thailand.

== Etymology ==
The district is named after the Thi River, and literally means 'Thi village'.

== History ==
The minor district (king amphoe) Ban Thi was established on 1 April 1990, when two tambons were split off from Mueang Lamphun district. It was upgraded to a full district on 7 September 1995.

== Geography ==
Neighboring districts are Mueang Lamphun of Lamphun Province to the south and San Kamphaeng of Chiang Mai province to the north.

The main river of the district is the Thi River, which originates in the Mae Thai mountain range in the east of the district. The river flows into the Mae Kuang River, a tributary of the Ping.

== Administration ==
The district is divided into two sub-districts (tambons), which are further subdivided into 34 villages (muban). Ban Thi is a township (thesaban tambon) which covers the whole tambon Ban Thi. There is one tambon administrative organizations (TAO). The sub-district of Ban Thi will be the site of the second Chiang Mai Airport.

No.	Name	Thai name	Villages	Pop.
1.	Ban Thi	บ้านธิ	19	9,496
2.	Huai Yap	ห้วยยาบ	15	8,111
