= Wat Saen Fang =

- วัดแสนฝาง
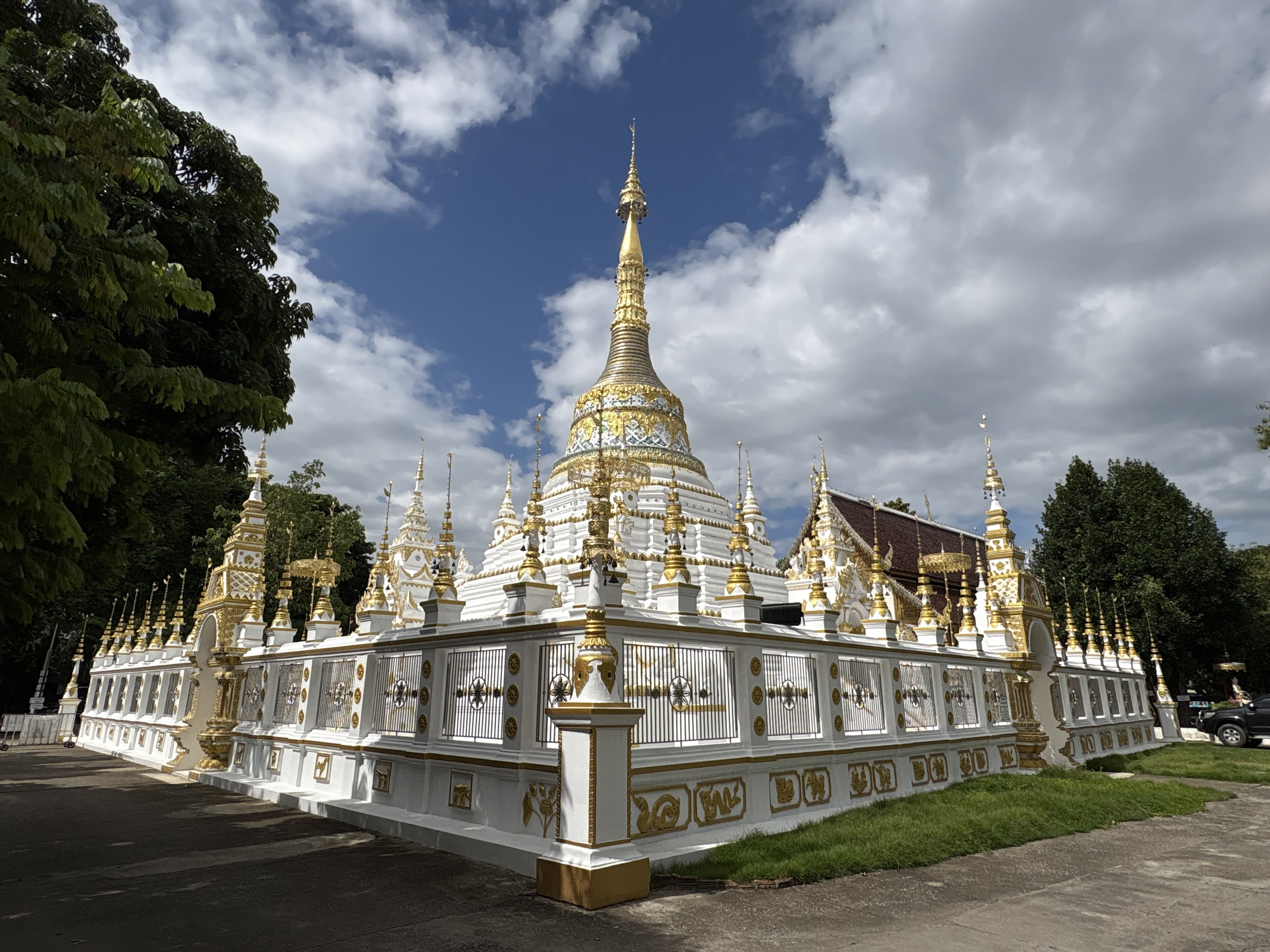
- Chedi of Wat Saen Fang

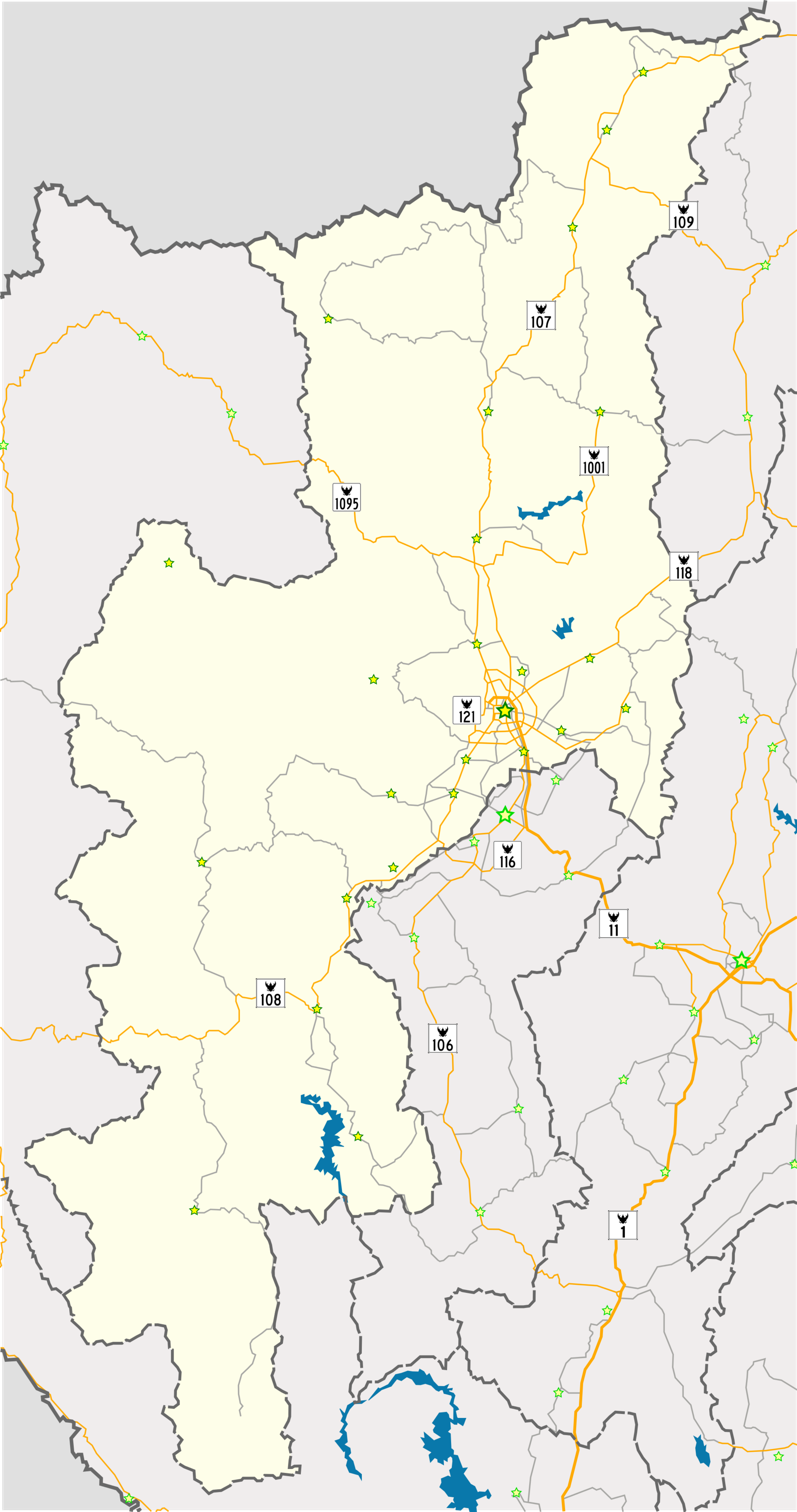
- Location within Chiang Mai Province Location within Thailand

Religion
- Affiliation: Buddhism
- Sect: Theravada Buddhism
- Province: Chiang Mai Province
- Status: Active

Location
- Municipality: Chiang Mai
- Country: Thailand
- Coordinates: 18.7891161°N 98.9986917°E

Architecture
- Established: c. 1500s

Wat Saen Fang (Thai: วัดแสนฝาง) is a Buddhist temple in Chiang Mai, Thailand. The temple was founded in the 1500s, but all extant structures date to the 1800s or later. The viharn of Wat Saen Fang previously served as the royal residence (ho kham) of Kawirolot in the 1860s, and was converted into a viharn by his successor, Inthawichayanon in 1878. The temple is also noted for its Burmese-style chedi, which is gilded with glass mosaic. The ubosot, which is topped with kinnara, is a fusion of Burmese and Lan Na styles.
