= Ban Hong district =

Ban Hong บ้านโฮ่ง
- District
- District location in Lamphun province
- Coordinates: 18°19′52″N 98°49′8″E
- Country: Thailand
- Province: Lamphun

Area
  - Total: 596.9 km^{2} (230.5 sq mi)

Population (2005)
  - Total: 42,697
  - Density: 71.5/km^{2} (185/sq mi)
- Time zone: UTC+7 (ICT)
- Postal code: 51130
- Geocode: 5103

Ban Hong (Thai: บ้านโฮ่ง, pronounced [bâːn hôːŋ]; Northern Thai: ᨷ᩶ᩣ᩠ᨶᩁᩰ᩠᩶ᨦ, pronounced [ba᷇ːn hôːŋ]) is a district (amphoe) of Lamphun province, northern Thailand.

== History ==
The minor district (king amphoe) Ban Hong was established in 1917, when it was split off from Pa Sang district. It was upgraded to a full district on 24 June 1956.

== Geography ==
Neighboring districts are (from the north clockwise): Wiang Nong Long, Pa Sang, Mae Tha, Thung Hua Chang and Li of Lamphun Province, Hot and Chom Thong of Chiang Mai province.

== Administration ==
The district is divided into five sub-districts (tambons), which are further subdivided into 59 villages (mubans). Ban Hong is a township (thesaban tambon) which covers parts of tambon Ban Hong. There are a further five tambon administrative organizations (TAO).

No.	Name	Thai name	Villages	Pop.
1.	Ban Hong	บ้านโฮ่ง	18	15,186
2.	Pa Phlu	ป่าพลู	12	7,758
3.	Lao Yao	เหล่ายาว	12	9,641
4.	Si Tia	ศรีเตี้ย	9	6,031
5.	Nong Pla Sawai	หนองปลาสะวาย	8	4,081
