= Wat Prasat, Mueang Chiang Mai =

Buddhist Temple in Chiang Mai, Thailand

Wat Prasat
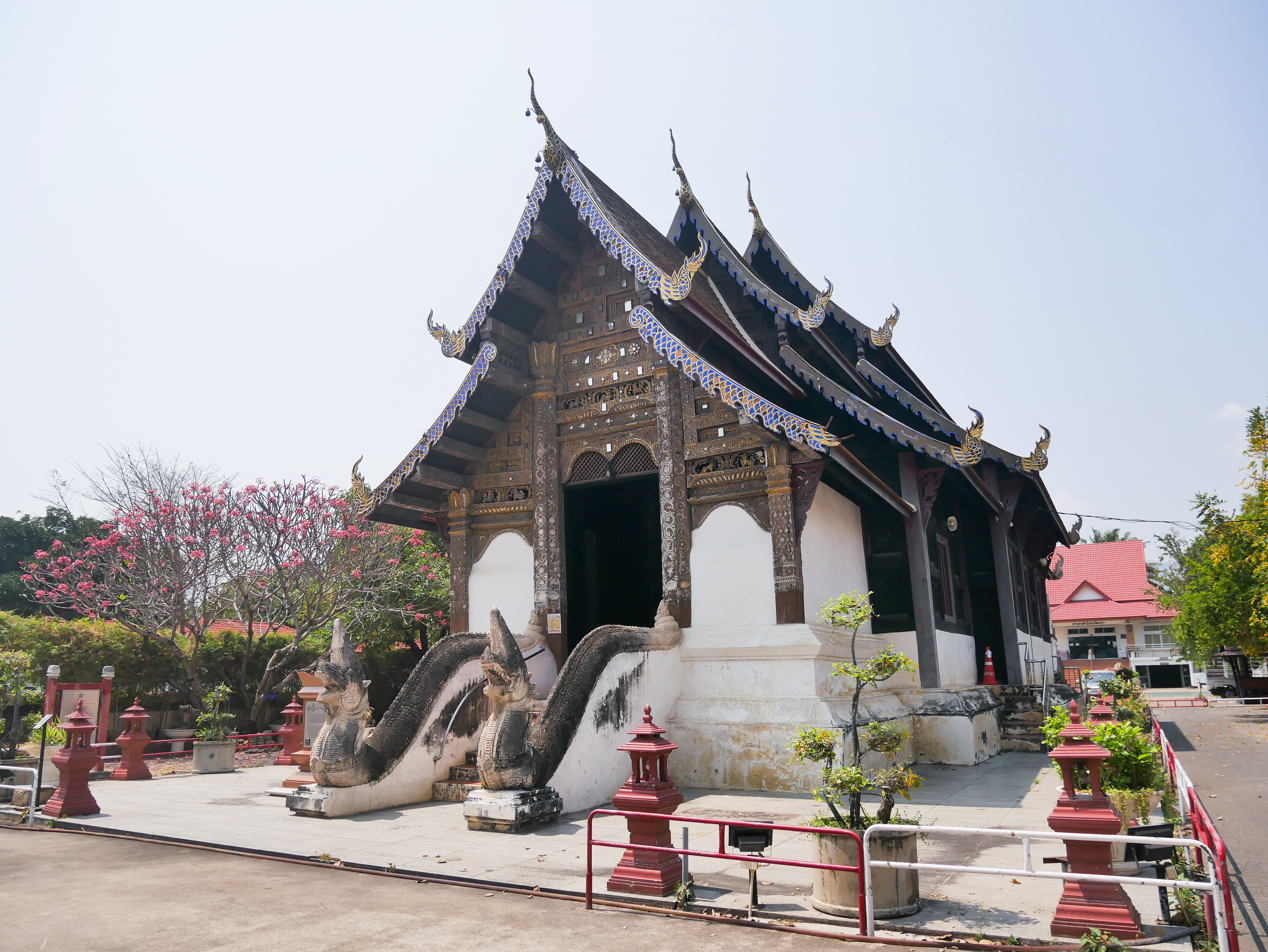
- Assembly hall

Religion
- Affiliation: Buddhism
- Sect: Therevada Buddhism

Location
- Location: Inthawarorot Road, Mueang Chang Mai district, Chiang Mai
- Country: Thailand
- Geographic coordinates: 18°47′20″N 98°58′56″E

Architecture
- Date established: 15th century

Wat Prasat is a Buddhist temple in Chiang Mai, northern Thailand. It is situated on Inthawarorot Road in the old city.

== History ==
Wat Prasat dates back to at least the end of the fifteenth century as evidenced by a stone inscription at Wat Tapotaram referring to its existence when the Lan Na Kingdom prospered during the reign of Yotchiangrai (1487-1495).

== Description ==
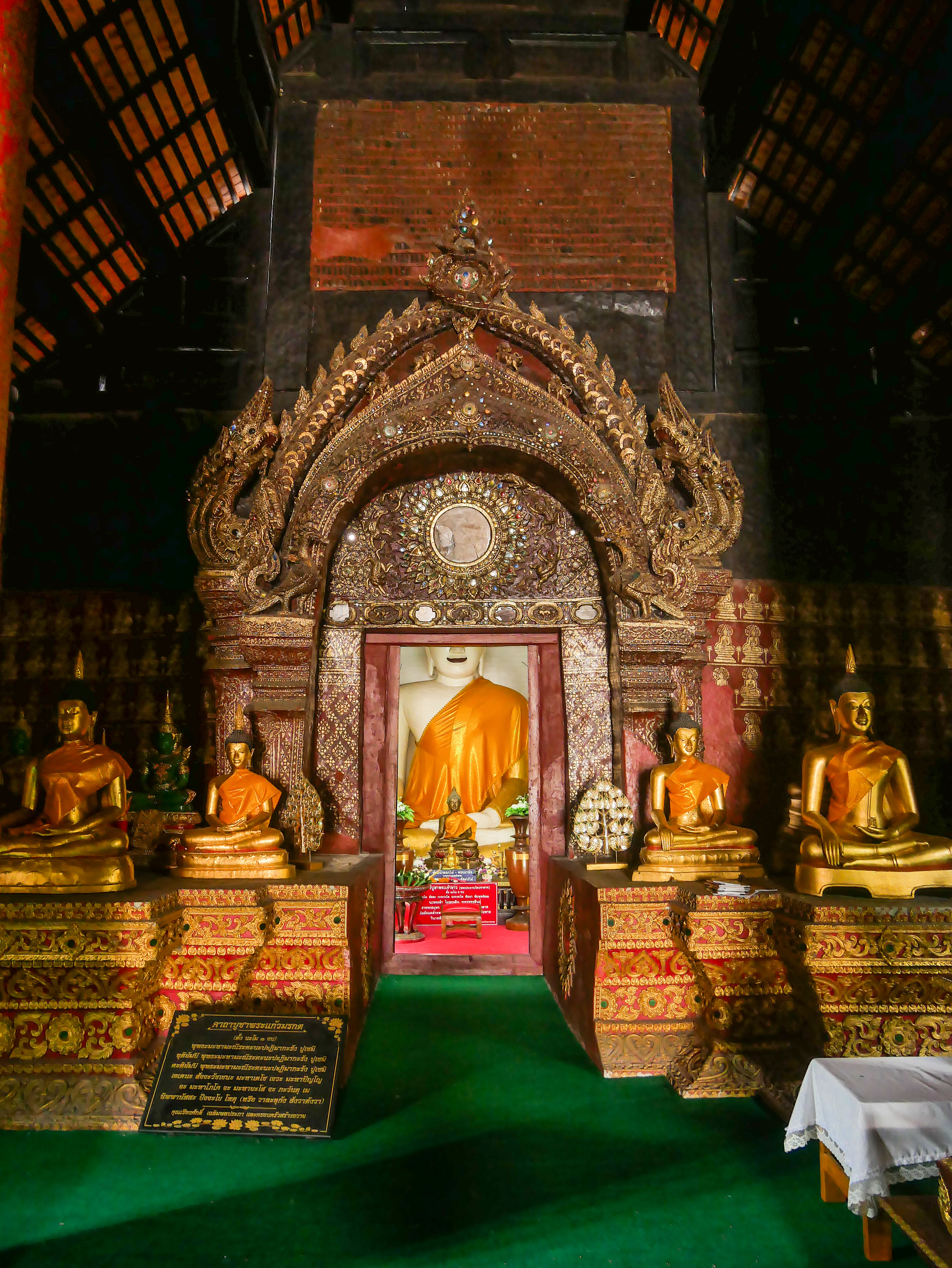
Main altar with alcove

The wooden assembly hall built in 1823 is fine example of the La Na architectural style. The pediment above the main entrance is filled with wooden carvings of various motifs and two nagas are positioned on either side of the steps.

An unusual feature of the interior is its rare configuration with the principal Buddha sitting in a small chamber (Ku Lai), which is joined to a small pagoda situated outside with a square base and niches for Buddha images. Found only in the Chiang Mai school of craftsmen, it was believed that this arrangement allowed the Buddha to practice meditation in peace and solitude. The entrance to the alcove is highly decorated with bas-relief motifs and coloured glass, and on either side are smaller Buddha images of stucco, and one of bronze in the Maravijaya attitude, referred to as Phra Chao Muen Thong, which has inscribed on its base the date of its casting in 1590. Two rows of parallel columns support the roof, and its walls have murals that are thought to date back to the 1820s. The temple also has a second assembly hall and a chedi of recent origin.
