= Lamphun province =

Province of Thailand

Coordinates: 18°34′45″N 99°0′23″E

Lamphun ลำพูน ᩃᨻᩪᩁ
- Province
- จังหวัดลำพูน · ᨧᩢ᩠ᨦᩉ᩠ᩅᩢᩃᨻᩪᩁ
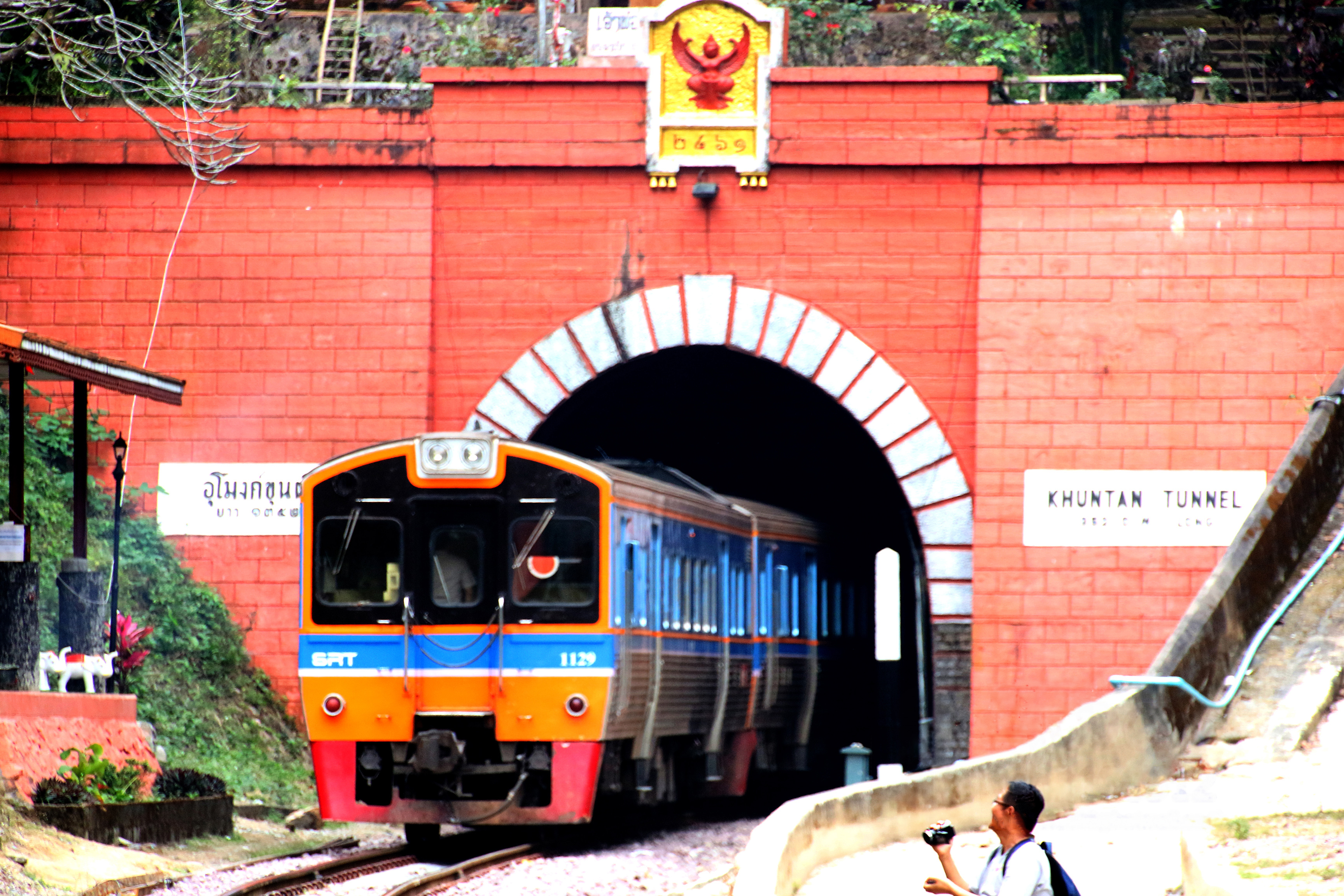
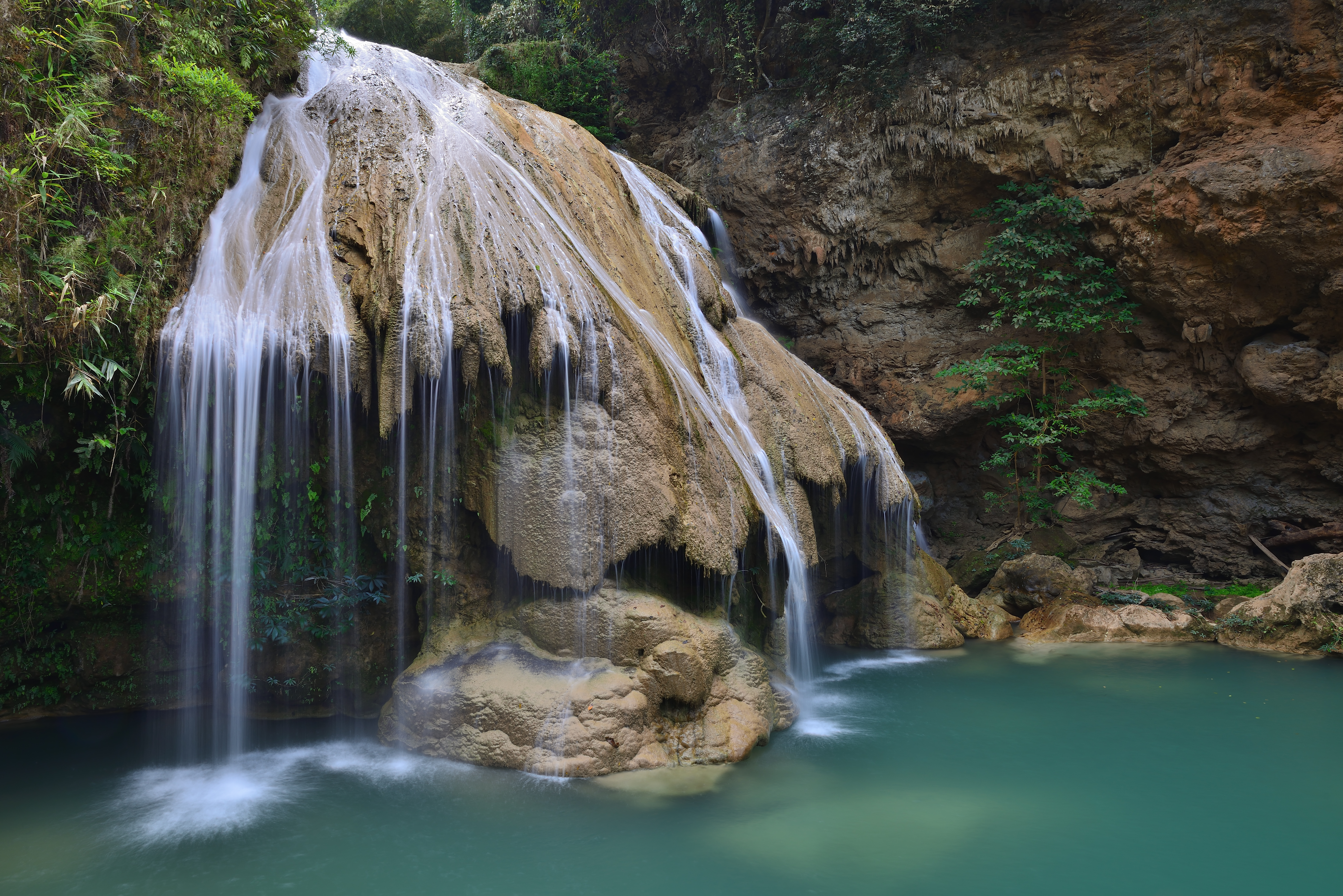
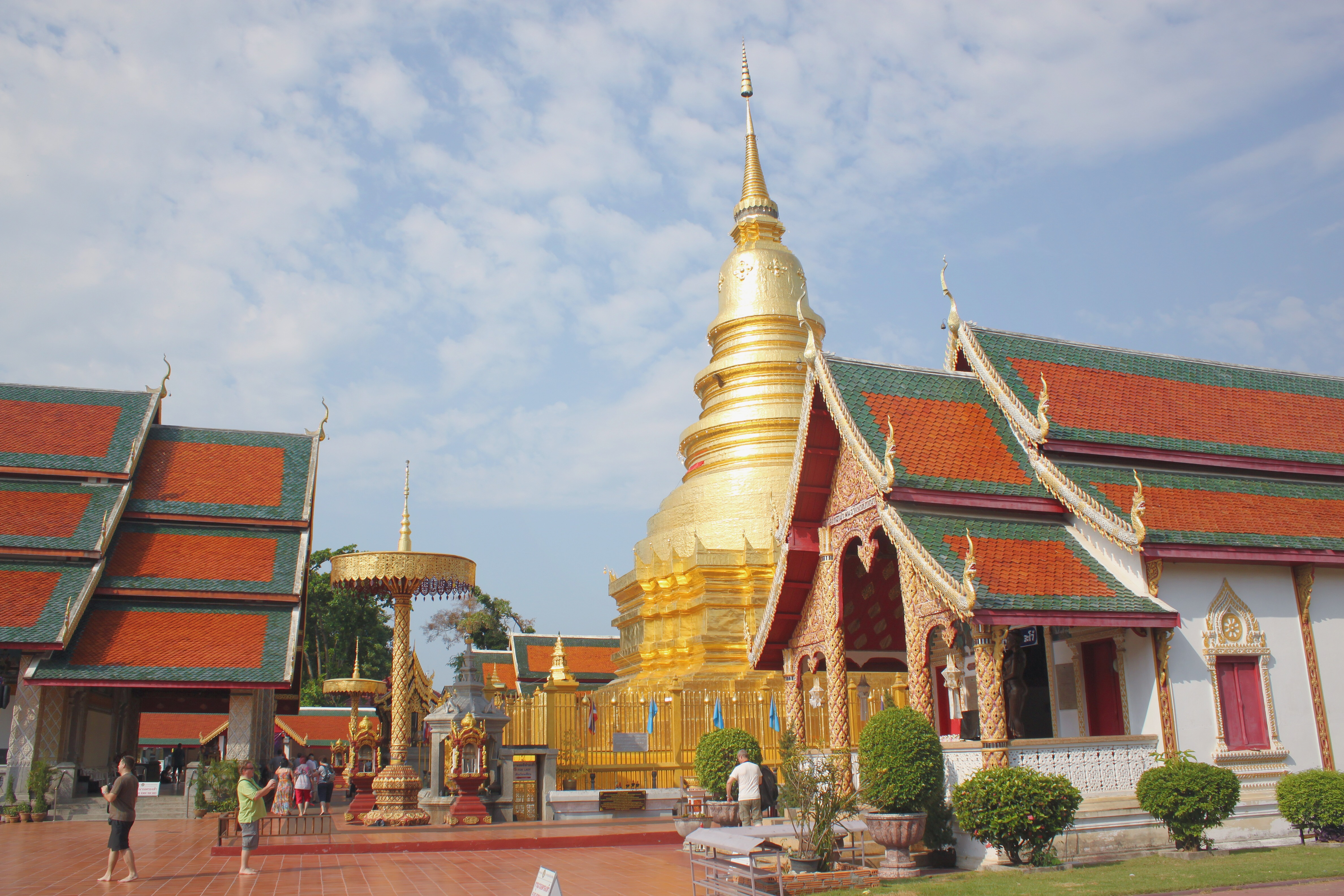
- From top: Khun Tan Tunnel of Khun Tan Railway Station in Mae Tha District, part of Khun Tan Range, Ko Luang Waterfall, Mae Ping National Park, Golden chedi of Wat Phra That Hariphunchai

- Flag Seal
- Nicknames: Haripunchai (Thai: หริภุญไชย); La Pun (Thai: หละปูน)
- Motto: พระธาตุเด่น พระรอดขลัง ลำไยดัง กระเทียมดี ประเพณีงาม จามเทวีศรีหริภุญไชย ("Distinct Phra That. Sacred Phra Rod amulet. Famous longan. Good garlic. Beautiful festivals. Chamdevi, the queen of Haripunchai.")
- Map of Thailand highlighting Lamphun province
- Country: Thailand
- Capital: Lamphun

Government
  - Type: Province and Provincial Administrative Organization
  - Body: Lamphun Province and Lamphun Provincial Administrative Organization
  - Governor: Wiwat Inthaiwong
  - PAO Chief Executive: Weeradej Phupisit

Area
  - Total: 4,478 km^{2} (1,729 sq mi)
  - Rank: 49th

Population (2024)
  - Total: ▼396,753
  - Rank: 64th
  - Density: 89/km^{2} (230/sq mi)
  - Rank: 51st

Human Achievement Index
  - HAI (2022): 0.6416 "average" Ranked 38th

GDP
  - Total: baht 78 billion (US$2.7 billion) (2019)
- Time zone: UTC+7 (ICT)
- Postal code: 51xxx
- Calling code: 052 & 053
- ISO 3166 code: TH-51
- Website: lamphun.go.th

Lamphun province
- "Lamphun" in Thai language (top) and Northern Thai with Tai Tham script (bottom)

Thai name
- Thai: ลำพูน
- RTGS: Lamphun

Northern Thai name
- Northern Thai: ᩃᨻᩪᩁ (La Phu)

Lamphun (Thai: ลำพูน, pronounced [lām.pʰūːn]; Northern Thai: ᩃᨻᩪᩁ, pronounced [lǎʔ pūːn]) is one of Thailand's seventy-six provinces (changwat), and lies in upper northern Thailand. Neighboring provinces are (from north clockwise) Chiang Mai, Lampang, and Tak.

Under its older name of Haripunchai the provincial town was the northernmost city of the Mon kingdoms of the Dvaravati period, and the last of them to fall to the Tai, in 1281. Burial grounds and an iron-working site in the basin are dated between the last centuries BCE and the sixth century CE. The province is known for its longan orchards and for Wat Phra That Hariphunchai.

== Geography ==
Lamphun is in the Ping River valley. It is surrounded by mountain chains, with the Thanon Thong Chai Range in the west and the Khun Tan Range in the east of the province. It is some 670 kilometres north of Bangkok and 26 kilometres south of Chiang Mai. The total forest area is 2,588 km^{2} (999 sq mi) or 57.8 percent of the provincial area. Lamphun is regarded as the smallest province of the northern region of Thailand.

=== National parks ===
The province has three national parks. Two belong to region 16 (Chiang Mai) of Thailand's protected areas. Doi Chong belongs to region 13 (Lampang branch). (Visitors in fiscal year 2024)

Mae Ping National Park	1,004 km^{2} (388 sq mi)	(35,415)
Mae Takhrai National Park	354 km^{2} (137 sq mi)	(24,983)
Doi Chong National Park	336 km^{2} (130 sq mi)	(1,310)

=== Wildlife sanctuaries ===
The only wildlife sanctuary in region 13 (Lampang branch) is in Lamphun province.

Doi Pha Muang Wildlife Sanctuary 687 km^{2} (265 sq mi)

=== Protected areas ===
Overview of protected areas of Lamphun

Lamphun protected areas

	National park
1	Doi Chong
2	Mae Ping
3	Mae Takhrai

	Wildlife sanctuary
10	Doi Pha Muang

== History ==
Occupation of the basin is attested before Haripunchai. Three burial grounds with grave goods have been dated: Yang Thong Tai to 500 BCE–100 CE, San Pa Kha to 138–618 CE and Wang Hai to 478–578 CE. A site producing iron tools at Ban Hong is dated to 554–595 CE. Saiklang Jindasu, who reports them, states that the people who left this material are not definitely identified, and only that they were likely a group holding the lowland before the Dvaravati population arrived from Lavapura.

Under its old name of Haripunchai, Lamphun was the northernmost city of the Mon kingdom of the Dvaravati period, and the last to fall to the Tai. The provincial government's account has it that in the late 12th century the city came under siege from the Khmer but did not fall. A Mon inscription from Vat Don, numbered LPh.01, records that King Sabbādhisiddhi was briefly ordained a monk on Tuesday 28 May 1219. His two sons attended, the teacher had reached the age of 82, and 80 monks and 102 novices resident in the temple, Jetavana, witnessed it. A hall for the rites of the monkhood had been built five years earlier. (Note: The date does not resolve cleanly. The weekday and the thirteenth day of the waxing moon of Jyestha work, but the Citra lunar mansion the inscription names fell three days earlier.) The Lamphun inscriptions are the Mon corpus that H. L. Shorto's dictionary of the Mon inscriptions incorporates. Christian Bauer held that five Old Mon inscriptions recovered in Chiang Mai province, which the dictionary does not carry, antedate all of them.

A king of Hariphunchai was for a time the favoured candidate for the donor of the Dong Mae Nang Mueang inscription of 1167 or 1168, found far to the south. George Cœdès proposed Ādityarāja or his successor Dhammikarāja, arguing from the Pali of its first face and from the bilingual Mon and Pali epigraphy soon to be cut at Lamphun. He withdrew the proposal on evidence that Lopburi had sent its own mission to China in 1155.

Wyatt sets the peopling of the Ping valley apart from that of the Yom and the Nan. Families moving down the Ping from Lampang and Lamphun came from country already Mon in its culture, Theravada in religion and literate; those coming down the other two rivers did not.

In 1281 Mangrai of Lan Na took the city and made it part of his kingdom. After Burmese expansion in the 16th century, Lamphun was under Burmese rule for two centuries. In the 18th century, with the rise of Thonburi and Bangkok against Burmese rule, local leaders from Lampang agreed to be their allies. Burmese rule ended, and Lamphun was ruled by relatives of Lampang's leader as a vassal of Bangkok. The administrative reforms of the late 19th century made Lamphun a province of Siam. Mon-speaking villages have also stood in the area of Lamphun and Lampang. McCormick and Jenny group them with the Thai Mon, communities thought to have originated in Burma in recent centuries.

== Symbols ==
The provincial seal shows the temple Wat Phra That Haripunchai, which was already the main temple of the city Lamphun during Mon times. The gold-covered chedi is said to contain a relic of Buddha.

The provincial flower is the Flame of the Forest (Butea monosperma), and the provincial tree is the Rain Tree (Samanea saman). The provincial aquatic life is the chubby frog (Glyphoglossus molossus).

== Transport ==
- Air: Lamphun is served by Lamphun Airport.
- Rail: Lamphun's main station is Lamphun Railway Station.

== Food ==
- Kaeng khae, a spicy curry consisting mainly of vegetables with chicken, frog, fish or snails.
- Kuaitiao lamyai, stewed pork noodles soup with dried longan, originated in Lamphun.

== Administrative divisions ==
Map of eight districts

=== Provincial government ===
The province is divided into eight districts (amphoes). These are further divided into 51 subdistricts (tambons) and 551 villages (mubans).

1. Mueang Lamphun
2. Mae Tha
3. Ban Hong
4. Li
5. Thung Hua Chang
6. Pa Sang
7. Ban Thi
8. Wiang Nong Long

For national elections the province is divided into three constituencies. Constituency 1 covers the Mueang District except Tambon Makhuea Chae; Constituency 2 the districts Pa Sang, Mae Tha, and Tambon Makhuea Chae of Mueang District; and Constituency 3 the districts Ban Hong, Thung Hua Chang, and Li.

=== Local government ===
As of 26 November 2019 there are: one Lamphun Provincial Administration Organisation (ongkan borihan suan changwat) and 40 municipal (thesaban) areas in the province. Lamphun has town (thesaban mueang) status. Further there are 39 subdistrict municipalities (thesaban tambon). The non-municipal areas are administered by 17 Subdistrict Administrative Organisations - SAO (ongkan borihan suan tambon).

== Human achievement index 2022 ==
Health	Education	Employment	Income
77	32	18	34
Housing	Family	Transport	Participation
55	31	48	1
Province Lamphun, with an HAI 2022 value of 0.6416 is "average", occupies place 38 in the ranking.

Since 2003, United Nations Development Programme (UNDP) in Thailand has tracked progress on human development at sub-national level using the Human achievement index (HAI), a composite index covering all the eight key areas of human development. National Economic and Social Development Board (NESDB) has taken over this task since 2017.

Rank	Classification
1 - 13	"high"
14 - 29	"somewhat high"
30 - 45	"average"
46 - 61	"somewhat low"
62 - 77	"low"

Map with provinces and HAI 2022 rankings

== Gallery ==
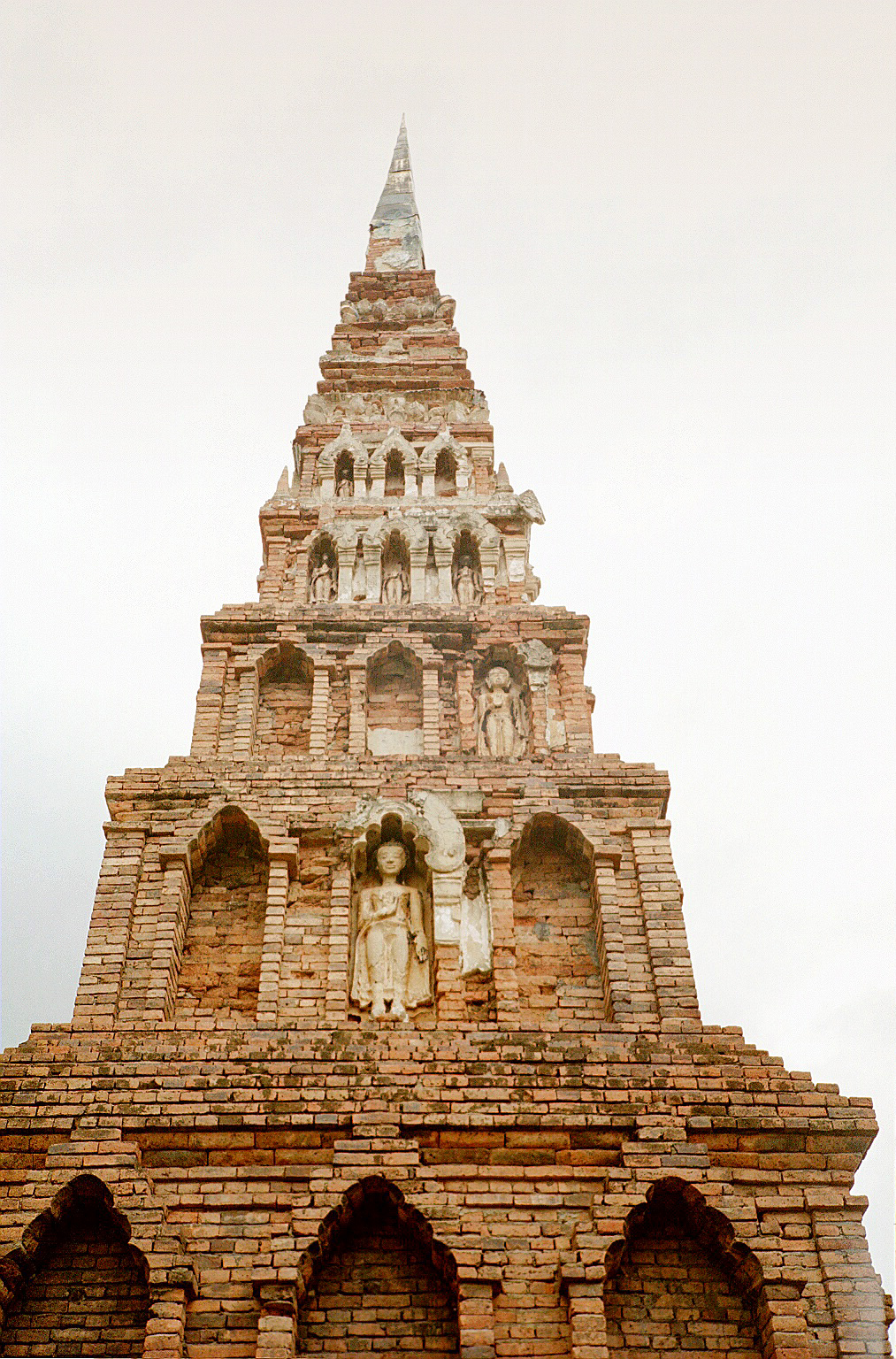
The Dvaravati-style chedi of Wat Phra That Hariphunchai

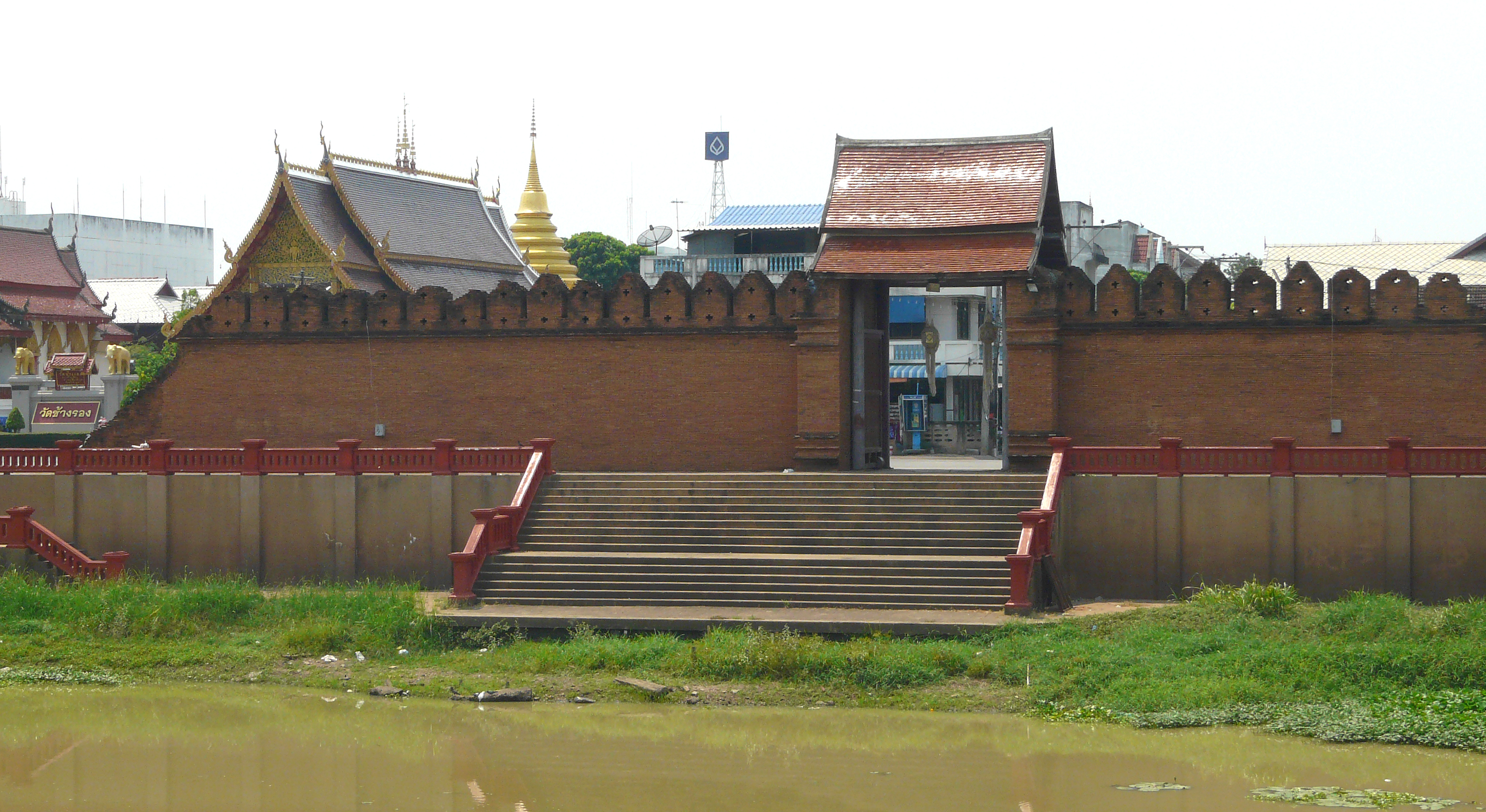
Lamphun Old City Wall
