= National Astronomical Research Institute of Thailand =

Thai government research institute

- สถาบันวิจัยดาราศาสตร์แห่งชาติ NARIT
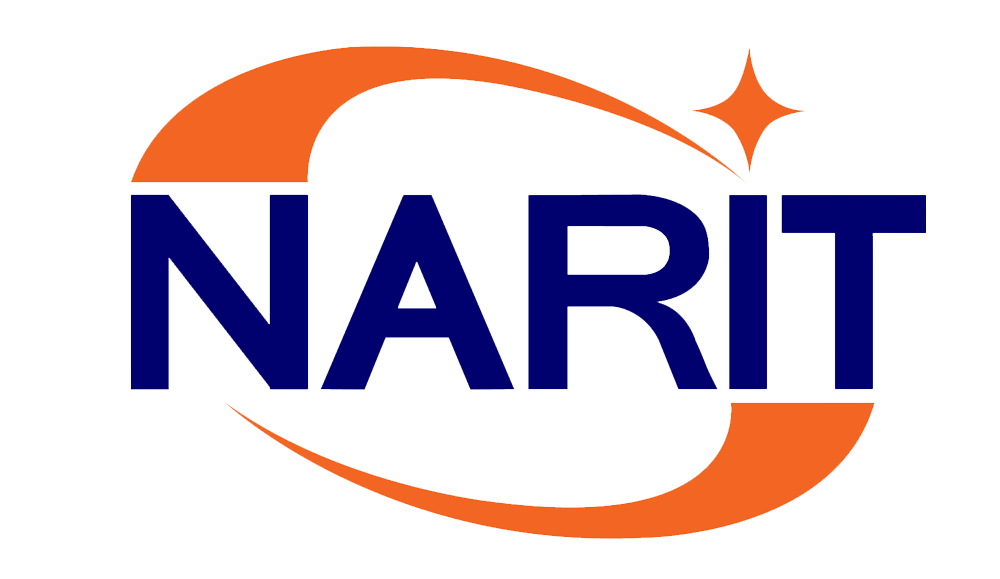

Public Organization overview
- Formed: 2004
- Type: Research institute
- Jurisdiction: Government of Thailand
- Headquarters: Chiang Mai, Thailand; 18.8527°N 98.9584°E
- Public Organization executive: Wiphu Rujopakarn, Director
- Parent department: Ministry of Higher Education, Science, Research and Innovation
- Website: www.narit.or.th

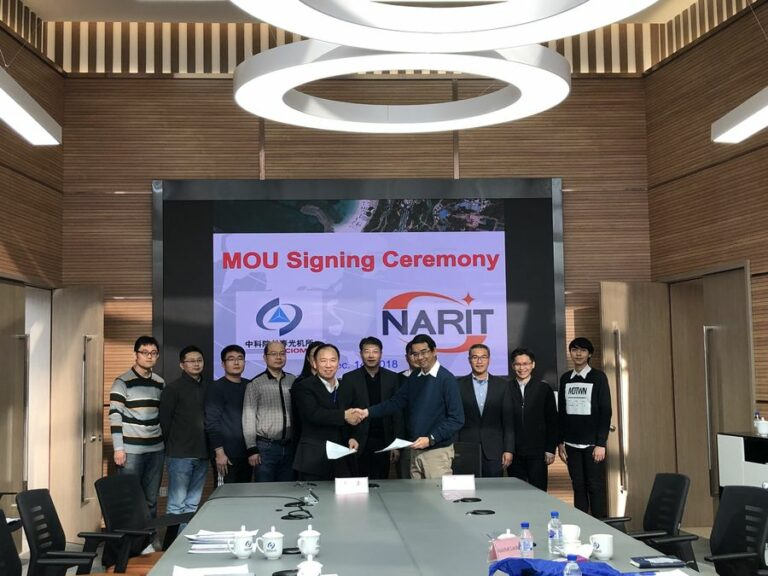
Director Saran of NARIT in the TSC Project MOU with China

The National Astronomical Research Institute of Thailand, or NARIT, is a research institute under the Ministry of Higher Education, Science, Research and Innovation. NARIT's headquarters are in Chiang Mai, Thailand. The main missions of the institute are to carry out, support, and promote the development of astronomy and astrophysics in Thailand through research, public outreach, and educational activities.

NARIT was established in 2004 as NARI (National Astronomical Research Institute), a statutory government institute under the Ministry of Science and Technology, to commemorate Bhumibol Adulyadej's 80th birthday. On 27 December 2008, the status of NARIT was changed to a non-profit public governmental organization.

The Thai National Observatory (TNO) is NARIT's main facility. TNO rests on Thailand's highest mountain, Doi Inthanon, in Doi Inthanon National Park, Chom Thong District, Chiang Mai Province. In 2020, NARIT completed the construction of the Thai National Radio Telescope (TNRO), a 40-meter single-dish short-millimeter telescope at the Huai Hong Khrai Royal Development Study Centre, in the Doi Saket District of the Chiang Mai Province.

== Functions ==
- Conducting research in astronomy and other related fields.
- Building research infrastructure in astronomy.
- Establishing international and national research and academic cooperation networks in astronomy.
- Pursuing knowledge and technology transfer in the field of astronomy.

== Research and development ==
Astronomical research conducted at NARIT ranges from study of the Solar System and galactic astronomy to extragalactic astrophysics and cosmology and is divided into four main strategic focuses:

- Impact of Events in Space on the Earth and Human Civilization.
- Understanding the Physics of the Universe.
- The Study of Exoplanets and the Search for Signs of Extraterrestrial Life in the Universe.
- Understanding the Origin of the Cosmos.

== NARIT's Infrastructure ==
=== The King's 7th Cycle Birthday Anniversary Observatory, or Thai National Observatory (TNO) ===
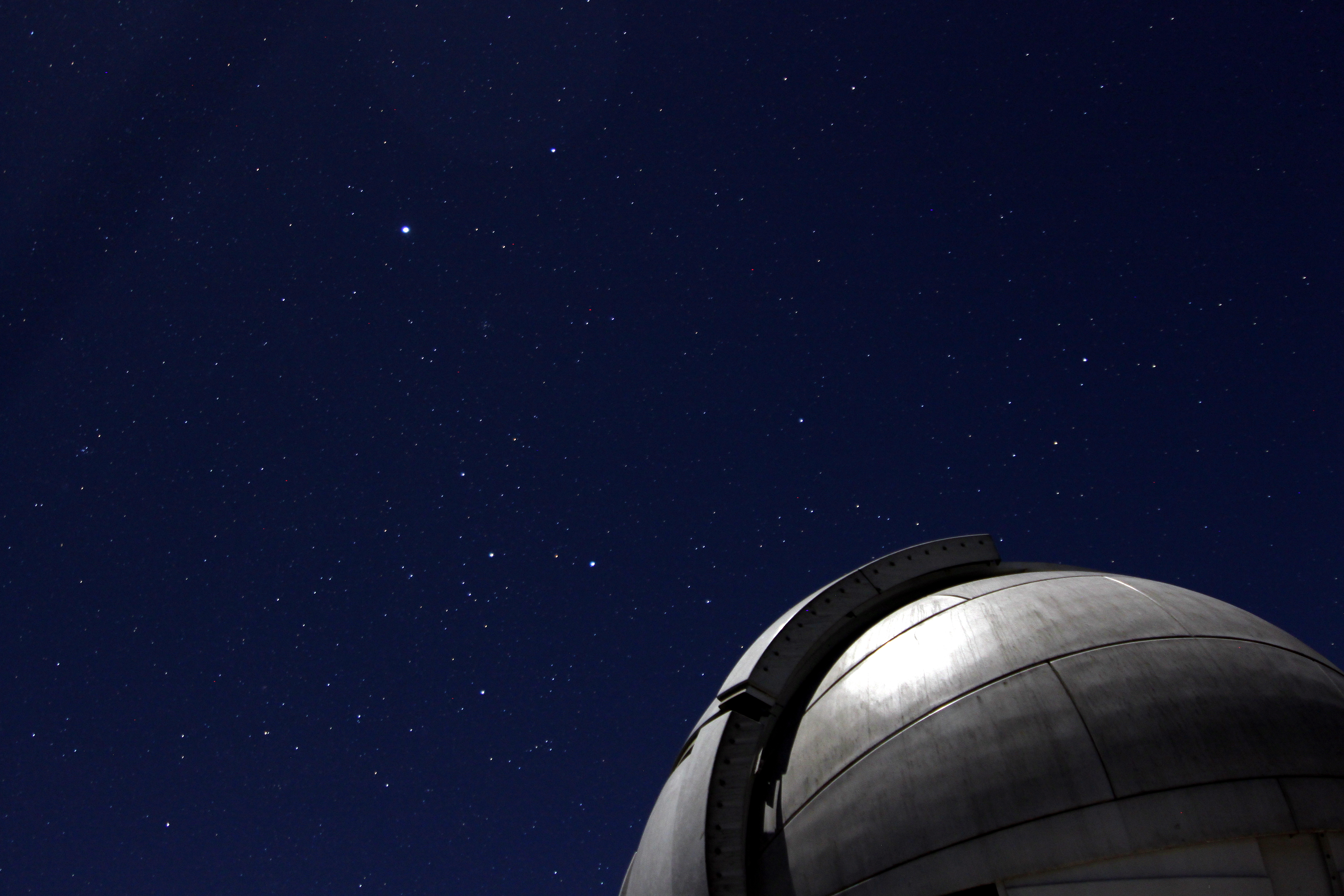
Sirius seen from the Thai National Observatory (TNO)

The Thai National Observatory is located in Doi Inthanon National Park (44th km), Chiang Mai Province. Its elevation is 2,450 meters above sea level.

Construction of the Thai National Observatory began in 2010 and was completed in 2012. The observatory has two operational buildings: the observatory, and the control building. The building's wall is a Ring Wall and the upper part is equipped with a 9-meter-diameter dome. Inside, the dome has a 2.4-meter-diameter reflecting telescope with automatic control systems. The telescope is located on a pier separated from the base of the building to ensure the telescope's stability is not impacted by any movement of the building. It is among the largest and most modern telescopes in Southeast Asia, and is one of only a few observatories in the world located near the equator, which can be used to observe celestial objects situated anywhere from the northern celestial pole to the southern celestial pole, allowing full coverage of the entire sky.

The control building has two storeys. It is NARIT's operation base for astronomers and telescope operators, and also has an exhibition area. The rooftop of the control building is equipped with a 1-meter telescope. In addition to the National Observatory, there is also an observatory in honor of the Late King Maha Bhumipol Adulyadej at the Doi Inthanon Report Station, where NARIT, in collaboration with the Ministry of Digital Economy and Society and the Royal Thai Air Force, monitors for potential threats caused by near-Earth objects and space debris, and studies the impact of the Sun and space on Earth's climate using a 0.7-meter telescope.

=== Princess Sirindhorn AstroPark ===
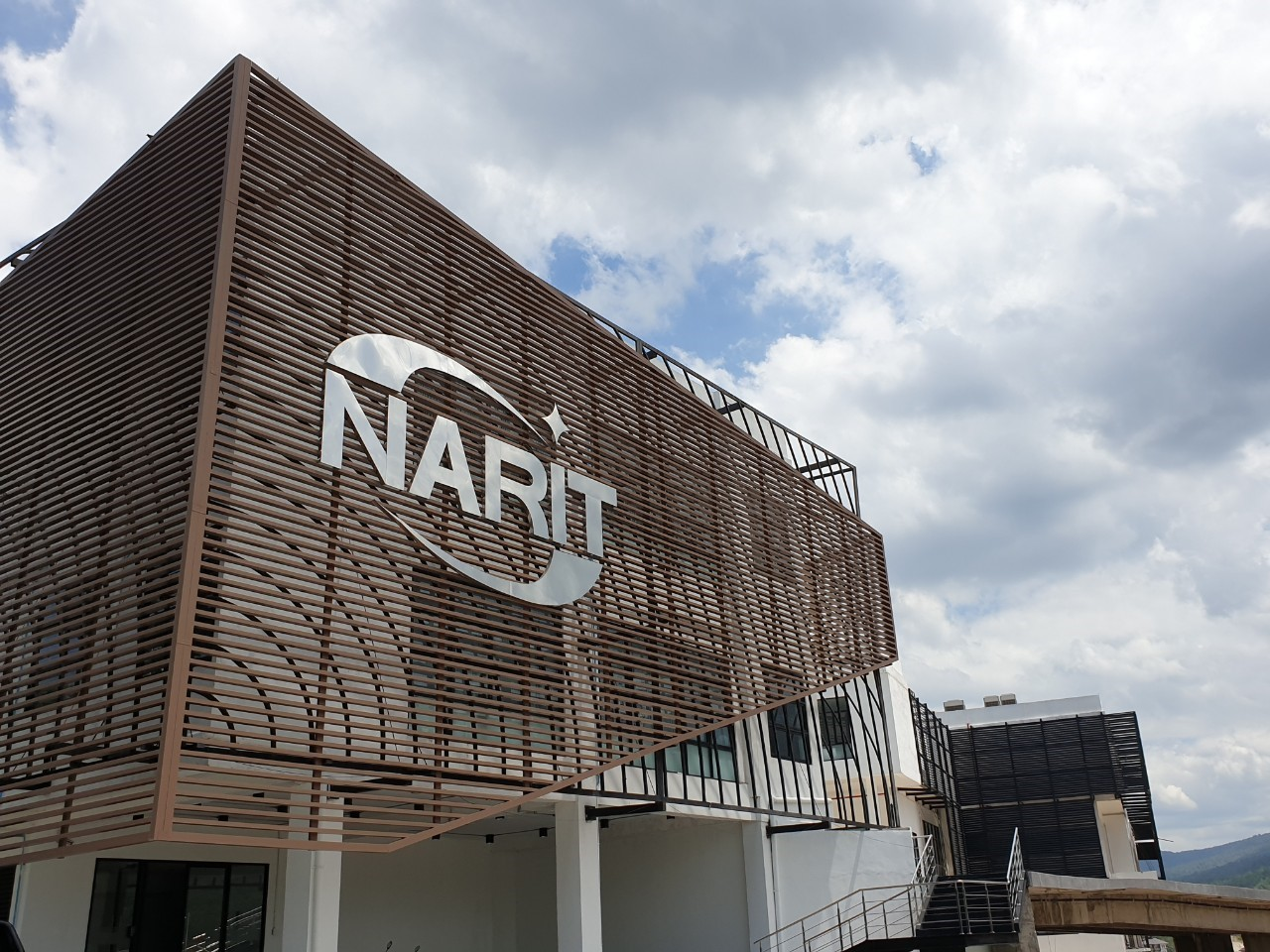
NARIT Headquarters at Princess Sirindhorn AstroPark, Chiang Mai

The Princess Sirindhorn AstroPark has an area of 86,400 square meters. It is located at 260 Moo 4, Don Kaew Sub-District, Mae Rim District, Chiang Mai Province.

Princess Sirindhorn AstroPark is the headquarters of NARIT and supports its main missions, which are research and study of astronomy, development of technology, academic services, and communication. Construction began in 2012 and was completed in 2020. The compound consists of the following:

- The Main Building - functions as the headquarters for Research and Development, Optics Laboratory, Radio Astronomy Center, Center for Astronomy and Communication Services, Information Technology Center, Library and Astronomy Archives Center, International Astronomy Training Center, and Main Mission Support Section.
- The Operation Building - houses the Mechatronic Laboratory and Mechanical Workshop, where high precision machining is conducted, and a mirror coating chamber.
- The Planetarium and Exhibition building - houses a full-dome digital planetarium, which has a maximum resolution of 8K, a diameter of 17 meters, and a capacity of 160 seats, with easy access for people with disabilities. It also has 19 interactive astronomy exhibitions. The Observatory is a building for stargazing equipped with a reflecting telescope 0.7 meters in diameter. On the side of the building is a star terrace with a convertible roof and five sets of small and medium-sized high-powered telescopes for general use.

=== Regional Observatories for the Public ===
On the 24th of March 2009, The Cabinet passed a resolution granting NARIT permission to proceed with plans to construct a Regional Observatory for the Public in each of the following five provinces: Nakhon Ratchasima, Chachoengsao, Songkhla, Khon Kaen, and Phitsanulok. As of 2019, three of these locations have been opened to the public—Nakhon Ratchasima, Chachoengsao, and Songkhla. The other two, Khon Kaen and Phitsanulok, are currently under construction. All five observatories in this project are under the royal patronage of Her Royal Highness Princess Maha Chakri Sirindhorn, who generously bestowed upon each the name "Regional Observatory for the Public in Honor of the King's 7th Cycle Birthday" followed by the name of the province in which it is located. The Main Structures of the Regional Observatory consist of The Observatory, a clamshell fiberglass dome 18 feet in diameter installed with a 0.7-meter reflecting telescope and a 180-degree retractable roof for panoramic observation with an adjacent roll-off roof observatory where smaller telescopes are installed, The Planetarium has a dome equipped with a high-resolution digital star projector that serves as a planetarium service and an astronomy exhibition space and Outdoor Learning Area for planet walk.

- Regional Observatory for the Public, Nakhon Ratchasima - Has an area 40,000 square meters and has a population of 466,098 people as of 2021. Located inside the Suranaree University of Technology, 111 University Street, Suranaree Sub-District, Nakhon Ratchasima Province District, Nakhon Ratchasima, 30000. It opened in November 2014.
- Regional Observatory for the Public, Chachoengsao - Has an area of 57,600 square meters. Located at 999 Moo 3, Wang Yen Sub-District, Plaeng Yao District, Chachoengsao, 24190. It opened in February 2018.
- Regional Observatory for the Public, Songkhla - Has an area of 40,000 square meters. Located at 79/4 Moo 4, Khao Rup Chang Sub-District, Songkhla Province District, Songkhla, 90000. It opened in July 2019.

=== National Radio Astronomy Observatory (TNRO) ===
The Thai National Radio Astronomy Observatory (TNRO) under the Radio and Geodesy Network Development Program installed the Thai National Radio Telescope which, at 40 meters in diameter, is the largest in Southeast Asia and the first radio telescope located on the equator. The National Radio Astronomy Observatory is located in Doi Saket District in Chiang Mai Province. It has the capacity to receive radio signals in the frequency range of 0.3 to 115 GHz and, along with another radio telescope with a diameter of 13 meters, will expand capabilities in astronomical observation, promote the use of astronomy in developing basic knowledge in science, technology, engineering, and mathematics (STEM), leading to the development of human capacity in astronomy and advanced engineering technology, along with increasing potential and human resources in advanced industries such as telecommunications, software engineering, and digital technology, etc.

The National Radio Telescope is a Nasmyth-Cassegrain radio telescope. The reflector plate can be rotated both vertically and horizontally to follow an object with high precision. It can be used to study objects in the universe and related physical phenomena, such as planets and comets in the solar system, the Sun, stars, active galactic nuclei, supernovae, neutron stars, galaxies, and black holes, etc.

The 13-meter-diameter radio telescope is used to conduct geodesy and geological research with a technique called Very-long-baseline interferometry (VLBI), which allows for high-precision measurement of the positions and movements of tectonic plates that may cause disasters such as earthquakes or tsunamis. Once completed, both telescopes at the Thai National Radio Astronomy Observatory will be utilized in collaboration with other observatories around the world within the network of International VLBI Service for Geodesy and Astronomy (IVS).

Only a fraction of electromagnetic radiation is within the 'visible spectrum', the spectrum that contains all the wavelengths visible to the human eye. Objects in the universe emit electromagnetic radiation with wavelengths outside this range, such as radio waves, microwaves, infrared waves, light waves, ultraviolet radiation, X-rays, and gamma rays. Therefore, modern astronomy research and study rely on observations at wavelengths beyond those visible to the naked eye.

=== The Thai Robotic Telescope Network (TRT) ===
Thailand is located at latitudes of 5 to 20 degrees north, allowing for full coverage of the northern celestial hemisphere but only partial coverage for observation of the southern celestial hemisphere. This lack of coverage negatively affects the study of the Galactic Center, since the Galactic Center is visible in the southern hemisphere. Additionally, Thailand's wet season reduces clear skies for half of the year, significantly limiting a telescope's ability to observe space. In response to these limitations, NARIT established the Thai Robotic Telescope Network (TRT) project. This project is focused on installing 0.6 and 0.7-meter telescopes in locations with optimal sky conditions and excellent astronomical visibility. There are currently telescopes installed in four locations: 1. Cerro Tololo Inter-American Observatory (CTIO) the Republic of Chile, under the PROMPT (Panchromatic Robotic Optical Monitoring and Polarimetry Telescopes) project, active since October 2013; 2. Gao Mei Gu Observatory (GAO) in the People's Republic of China, active since October 2015; 3. Sierra Remote Observatories (SRO) in California, the United States, active since December 2015; and 4. Springbrook Observatory (SBO) in New South Wales, Australia, active since July 2017.

NARIT designed and developed the robotic telescope network control system by applying technology from mechatronics engineering, computer science, astronomy, and optics, operating in remote mode and robotic mode through the Internet from anywhere in the world. It has a system for automatically targeting and tracking celestial objects both in the Northern and Southern hemispheres for the benefit of astronomy research and study. This network serves both domestic and international astronomers as well as provides support for research at primary and secondary school levels.
