= Thai National Observatory =

Astrotelescope atop Doi Inthanon, Thailand

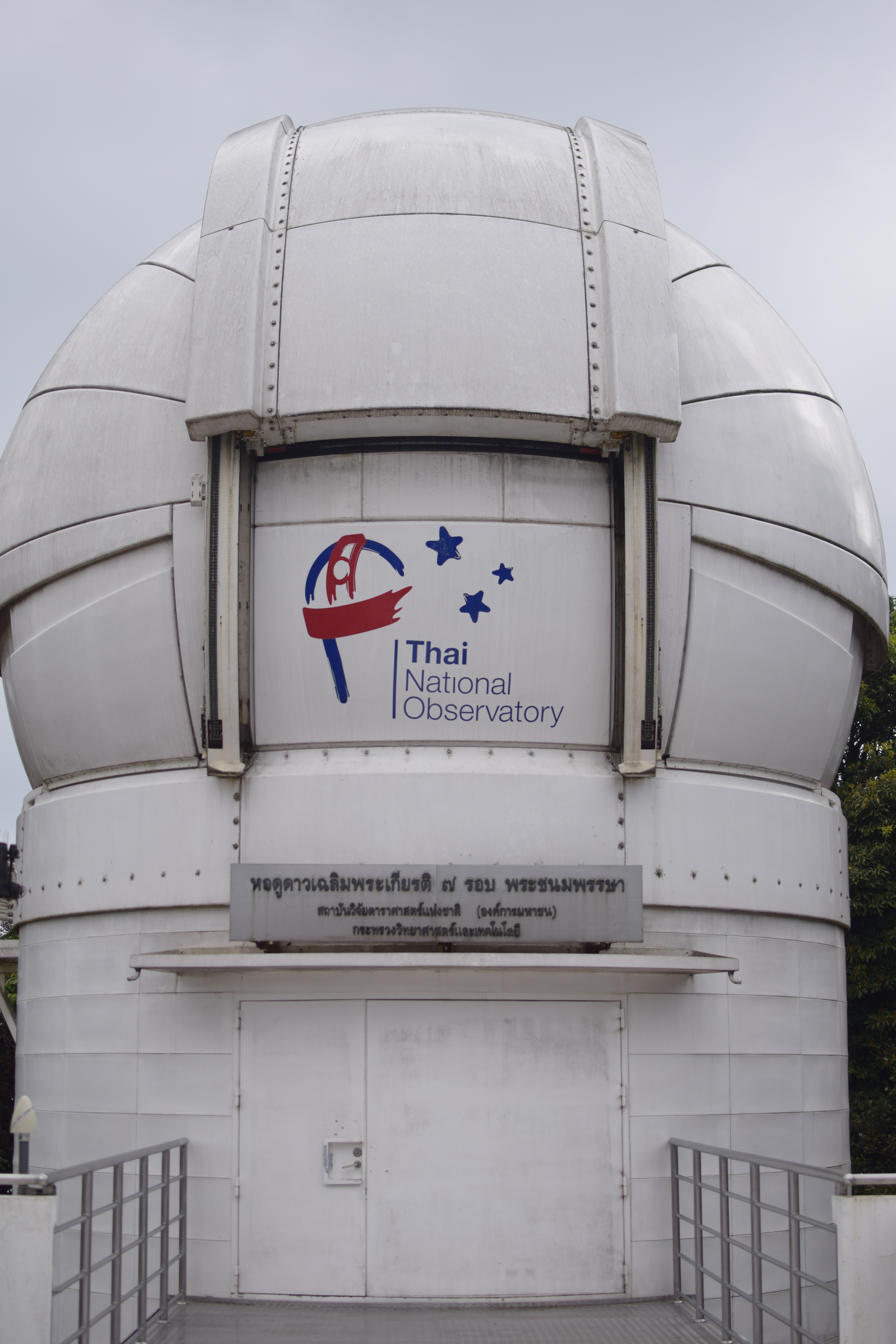
- Dome and entry point of the 2.4-m Thai National Telescope (TNT)
- Organization: National Astronomical Research Institute of Thailand
- Location: Doi Inthanon, Chiang Mai province, Thailand
- Coordinates: 18°35′26″N 98°29′12″E
- Altitude: 2,457 m (8,061 ft)
- Website: www.narit.or.th/index.php/telescope/tno,%20https://www.narit.or.th/index.php/en-observing-facilities/en-tno
- Telescopes: 0.5-meter robotic telescope of the Thai National Observatory; Thai National Telescope
- Related media on Commons

Thai National Observatory (TNO) is in Doi Inthanon National Park, Chom Thong District, Chiang Mai Province, Thailand. Atop Thailand's highest mountain, Doi Inthanon, this observatory is part of the National Astronomical Research Institute of Thailand, and is its main facility.

== Facilities ==
The TNO has of two sections—the main observatory, and an auxiliary station lower on the mountain with offices and lodging for astronomers, facilities for public outreach activities (like school groups), and a small permanent exhibition for the public. Because the observatory is located in a national park, it was built to minimize environmental impact.

== Equipment ==
- 2.4-meter reflecting Ritchey–Chrétien telescope with altazimuth mount, known as the Thai National Telescope (TNT). The telescope control system also controls movement of the dome automatically. The telescope itself was manufactured in Tucson, Arizona at EOS Technologies, Inc. (EOST). The primary mirror was fabricated and polished at the Lytkarino Optical Glass Factory (LZOS) in Russia. It is the largest optical telescope in the region. The TNT is used for research by NARIT astronomers and visiting researchers.
- 1.0-meter CDK1000 Corrected Dall–Kirkham telescope with altazimuth mount made by PlaneWave Instruments.
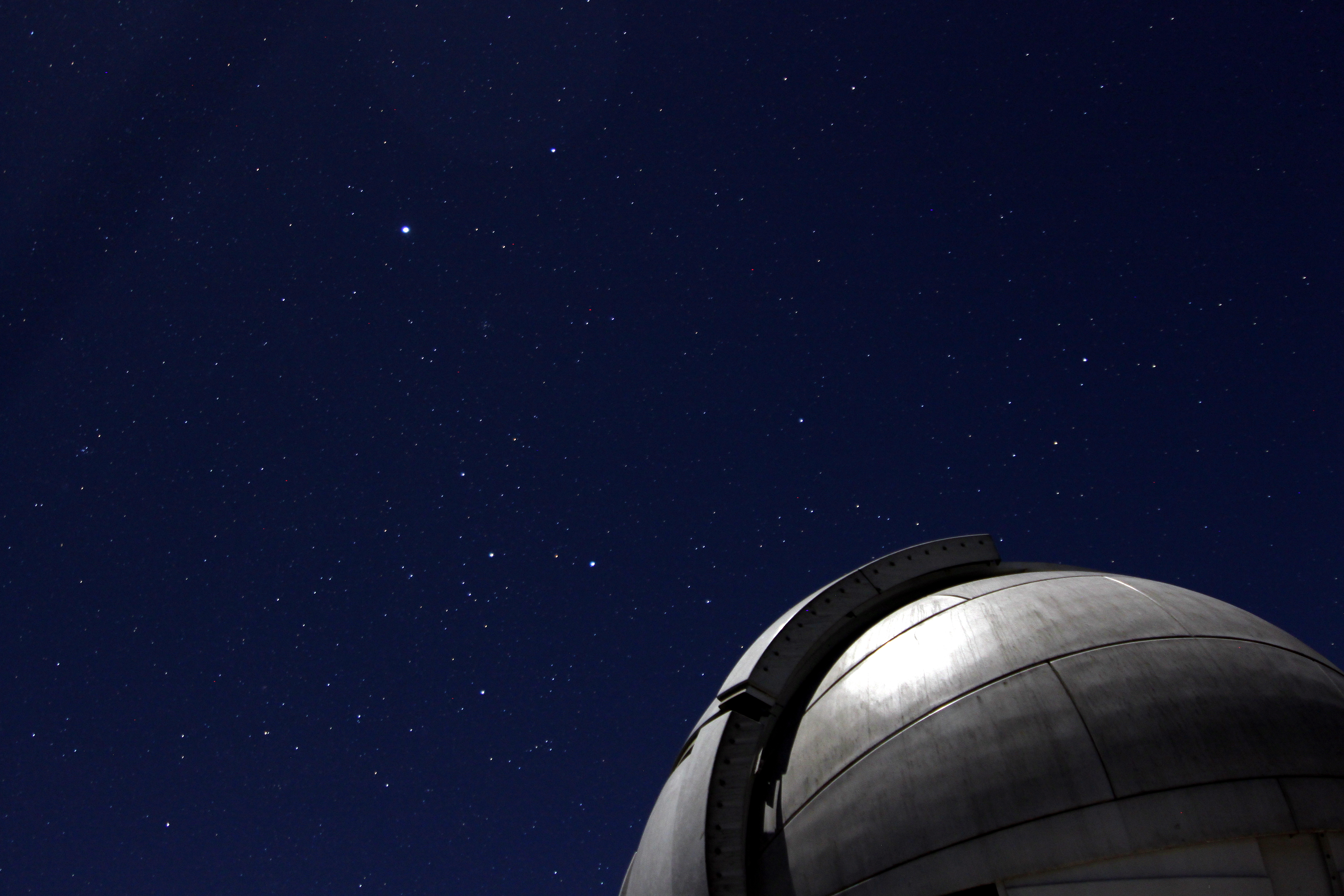
  Sirius seen from the Thai National Observatory
- 0.5-meter Schmidt-Cassegrain robotic telescope. This is similar to the type used at NARIT's regional observatories. It is used for training and education, testing new instrumentation and techniques, supporting the main telescope, and research that does not require the use of the main telescope.
- 2k x 2k CCD photometer with an BVRI filter system
- A research-grade 4k x 4k CCD photometer with an BVRI filter system
- A high-resolution echelle spectrograph (scheduled for use in 2014)
