= Wachirathan Falls =

- น้ำตกวชิรธาร
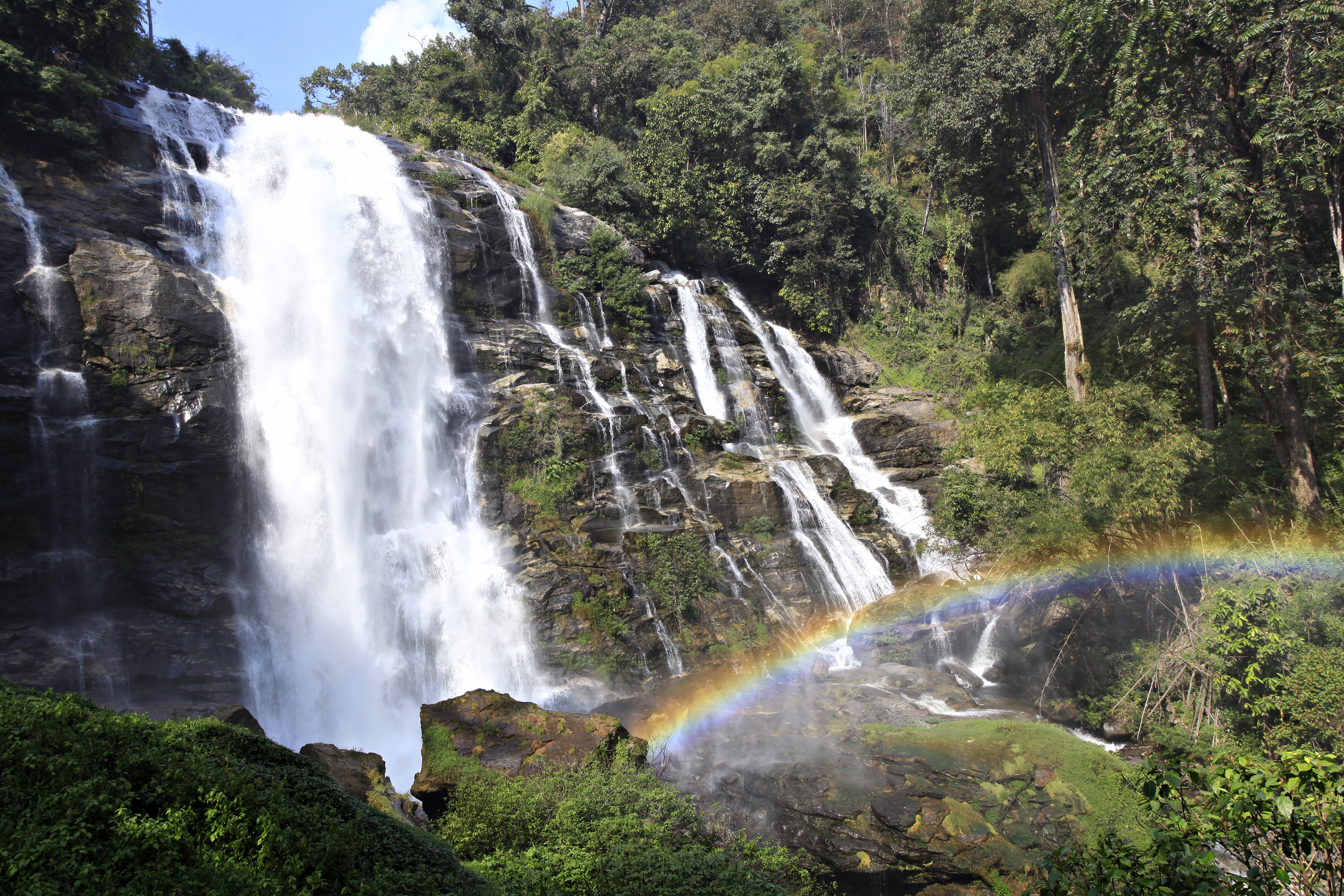
- Wachirathan waterfalls

- Location within Thailand
- Location: Chom Thong, Chiang Mai, Thailand
- Coordinates: 18°32′31″N 98°35′54″E
- Type: Segmented
- Elevation: 80 m (260 ft)
- Watercourse: Mae Klang River

Wachirathan Falls (Thai: น้ำตกวชิรธาร lit. Diamond Creek Falls, also spelled Vachirathan) are waterfalls in the Chom Thong district in the province of Chiang Mai, Thailand.

== Geography ==
Wachirathan (lit. Diamond Creek) flows down a granite escarpment on the way up to the summit of Doi Inthanon, the highest mountain in Thailand. Although segmented, its falls have a cumulative height of 80 m. It is one of several waterfalls in the area.

== See also ==
- List of waterfalls
