= Wat Phra That Si Chom Thong Worawihan =

Buddhist temple in Chiang Mai province, Thailand

- วัดพระธาตุศรีจอมทองวรวิหาร
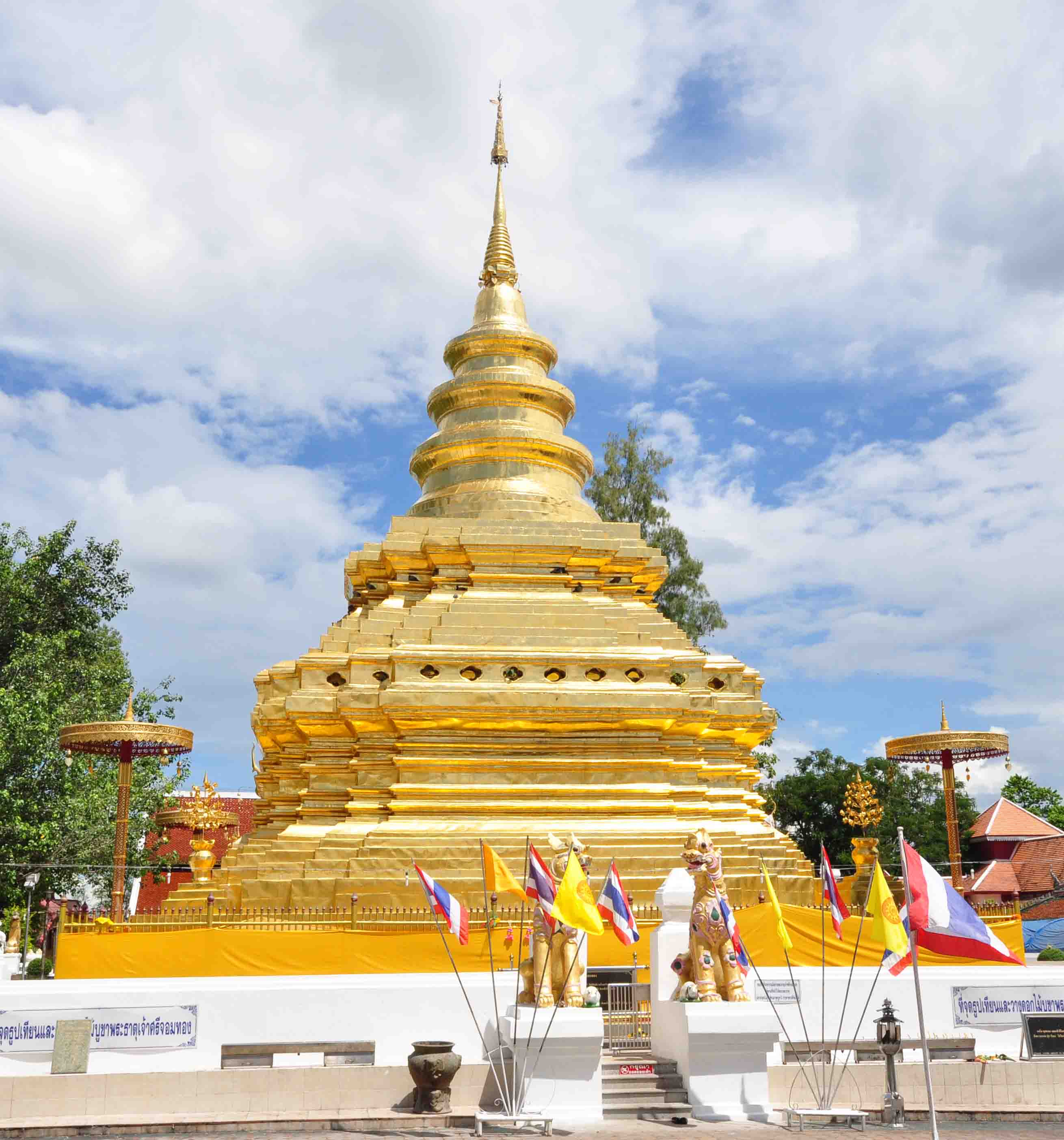
- Chedi of Wat Phra That Si Chom Thong

Religion
- Affiliation: Buddhism
- Sect: Theravada Buddhism
- District: Chom Thong district
- Province: Chiang Mai Province
- Status: Active

Location
- Location: Ban Luang, Chom Thong, Chiang Mai 50160
- Country: Thailand
- Interactive map of Wat Phra That Si Chom Thong Worawihan
- Coordinates: 18°25′12.5″N 98°40′43.5″E

Architecture
- Founder: Por Soi and Mae Meng
- Established: 1452

Website
- watchomtong.com

Wat Phra That Si Chom Thong Worawihan (Thai: วัดพระธาตุศรีจอมทองวรวิหาร), formerly Wat Phra That Chao Si Chom Thong, is a Buddhist temple (wat) in Chom Thong district, Chiang Mai province, Thailand. It is a royal temple of the third class of the Worawihan type, and houses a relic of the Buddha from the right side of his head, the Phra Dakkhina Moli Dhatu, making it one of the most important pilgrimage sites of northern Thailand.

== Location and status ==
The temple stands on a raised mound of earth about ten metres high, traditionally called Doi Chom Thong, on the Chiang Mai–Hod road (Route 108) in the village of Ban Luang, Chom Thong district, about 58 kilometres south of Chiang Mai. The Doi Inthanon range and the Mae Klang river lie to the west. It is a royal temple (phra aram luang) of the third class of the Worawihan type since 1963, and was registered as a national ancient monument in 1935.

=== Buddha relic ===
The temple enshrines the Phra Dakkhina Moli Dhatu, a relic said to come from the right side of the Buddha's head (crown), about the size of a jujube seed, round, smooth and ivory-white in colour. According to the temple chronicle, the Buddha prophesied during a visit to the ancient city of Angkarattha that after his passing the relic of the right side of his head would be enshrined at Doi Chom Thong. The king of Angkarattha built a stupa on the mound, and later the Indian emperor Ashoka excavated a cave beneath it, placed the relic in a new stupa and sealed the cave, vowing that the relic would reappear to the faithful in the future.

In 1499, during the abbacy of Phra Dhammapañño, a dream revealed the presence of the relic beneath the temple's hall; the next day a relic was found in the crown cavity of a Buddha image kept in the vihara. In 1515 a monk brought from Pagan (Burma) the chronicle Tamnan Phra Dakkhina Moli Dhatu, and in 1517 King Mueang Kaeo of the Mangrai dynasty, ruler of Chiang Mai, ordered the construction of the four-fronted hall (vihara caturmukha) with an inner prasat where the relic was enshrined; it is preserved there to this day, in a five-tiered urn.

The relic is the guardian phra that of people born in the Year of the Rat in the Thai tradition of birth-year relics.

== History ==
The temple is traditionally said to have been founded in 1452 by the lay couple Por Soi and Mae Meng, who began a temple on the mound called Wat Si Chom Thong, which remained unfinished at their deaths. In 1466 two men, Sip Ngoen and Sip Thua, restored the temple and built a thatched hall, inviting Phra Sariputtathera to be its first abbot. The chronicle of the temple, Tamnan Phra Borommathat Chom Thong, was published by the temple in 1976.

Most of the present buildings date from the period of the restoration of Chiang Mai after 1800; the current main hall is dated to 1817. The temple received its consecrated boundary in 1927, was registered as a national ancient monument in 1935, was elevated to a royal temple of the third class of the Worawihan type in 1963, and was named a model temple by the Department of Religious Affairs in 1981 and 1995.

== Meditation centre ==
The temple's vipassana meditation centre (samnak vipassana kammathan) is the first official provincial meditation centre of Chiang Mai. It was founded in the early 1990s by the temple's abbot, the Venerable Ajaan Tong Sirimangalo (Phra Phrommongkhon, 1923–2019), a leading teacher of the Mahasi tradition who had trained directly with Mahasi Sayadaw in Burma in 1957. Ajaan Tong was appointed abbot of Wat Phra That Si Chom Thong in 1991 by the Supreme Patriarch, and under his guidance the centre grew to include over a hundred meditation huts (kuti) and an international department, Northern Vipassana, opened in 2000. The centre teaches vipassana meditation to monks, novices and lay people, Thai and foreign, with daily meditation interviews, and has branches abroad, including in Germany. The Canadian monk Yuttadhammo Bhikkhu was ordained at the temple under Ajaan Tong in 2001.

== Grounds and museum ==
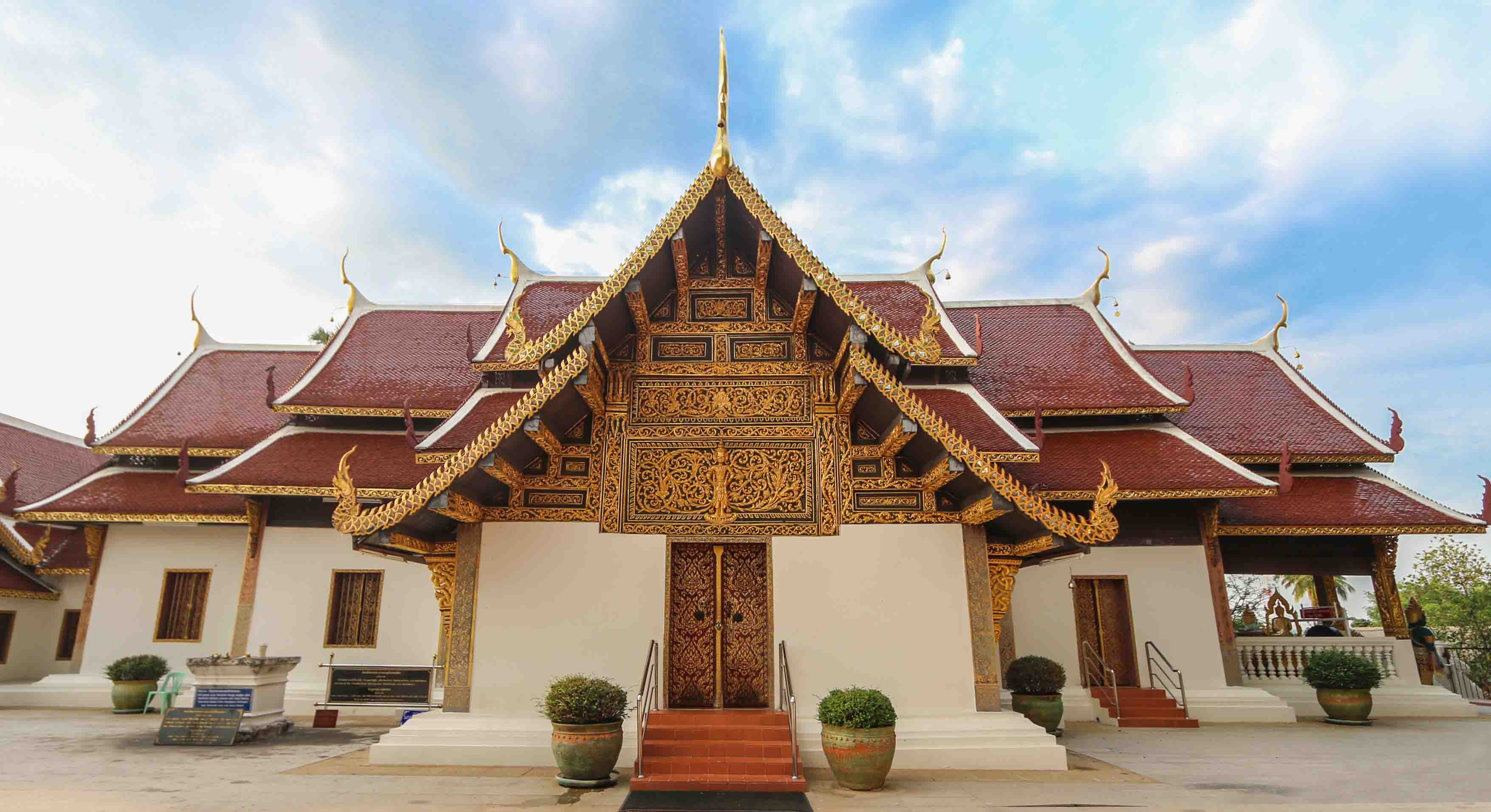
The main hall (vihara) of Wat Phra That Si Chom Thong

The temple grounds include the principal chedi, Phra That Si Chom Thong, a square-based, gold-covered structure in the Lanna style, and a smaller chedi (phra that noi) of about three hundred years, traditionally attributed to the Burmese during their rule of Chiang Mai. A museum building on the grounds displays the history of the temple by period along with ancient objects, including items donated by Princess Dara Rasmi of Chiang Mai, consort of King Chulalongkorn (Rama V).

== Festivals ==
During the Songkran festival, on 15 April, the relic is brought out for the traditional ritual bathing (song nam phra that), accompanied by a procession in which each village carries mai kham pho, poles supporting miniature Bodhi trees, to the temple.

== See also ==
- Ajahn Tong Sirimangalo
- Mahasi Sayadaw
- Doi Inthanon
