= Sop Tia =

Coordinates: 18.3895°N 98.6780°E

Sop Tia สบเตี๊ยะ
- Tambon
- Interactive map of Sop Tia
- Country: Thailand
- Province: Chiang Mai
- District: Chom Thong

Population (2005)
  - Total: 12,739
- Time zone: UTC+7 (ICT)

Sop Tia (Thai: สบเตี๊ยะ) is a tambon (subdistrict) of Chom Thong District, in Chiang Mai Province, Thailand. In 2005 it had a population of 12,739 people. The tambon contains 20 villages.
