= Thai National Radio Telescope =

Radio telescope in Thailand

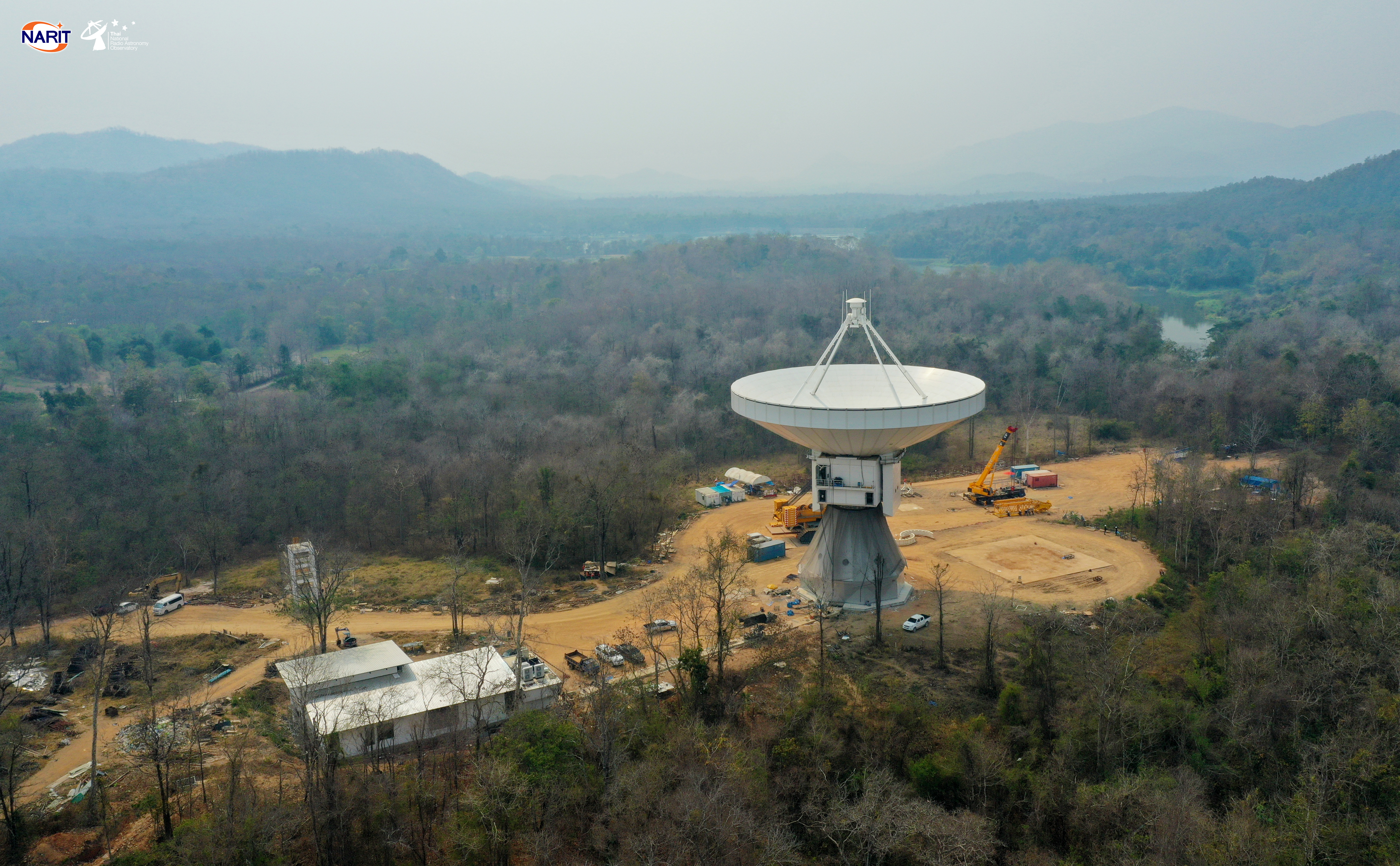

- Location(s): Doi Saket district, Chiang Mai province, Thailand
- Coordinates: 18°51′52″N 99°13′01″E
- Organization: National Astronomical Research Institute of Thailand
- Diameter: 40 m (131 ft 3 in)
- Website: www.narit.or.th/en/observatory/thai-national-radio-telescope
- Location of Thai National Radio Telescope
- Related media on Commons

The Thai National Radio Telescope is a 40 m single-dish short-millimetre telescope located in Huai Hong Khrai Royal Development Study Centre at Doi Saket District in Chiang Mai Province, and operated by the National Astronomical Research Institute of Thailand (NARIT). The radio observatory operates in the frequency range of 300 MHz – 115 GHz. The contract for the construction of the telescope was awarded March 2017 to the Germany company MT Mechatronics, a subsidiary of OHB SE.
