= Khuang Pao =

Khuang Pao ข่วงเปา
- Tambon
- Country: Thailand
- Province: Chiang Mai
- District: Chom Thong

Population (2005)
  - Total: 10,912
- Time zone: UTC+7 (ICT)

Khuang Pao (Thai: ข่วงเปา) is a tambon (subdistrict) of Chom Thong District, in Chiang Mai Province, Thailand. In 2005 it had a population of 10,912 people. The tambon contains 12 villages.
