= Cassegrain Nasmyth =

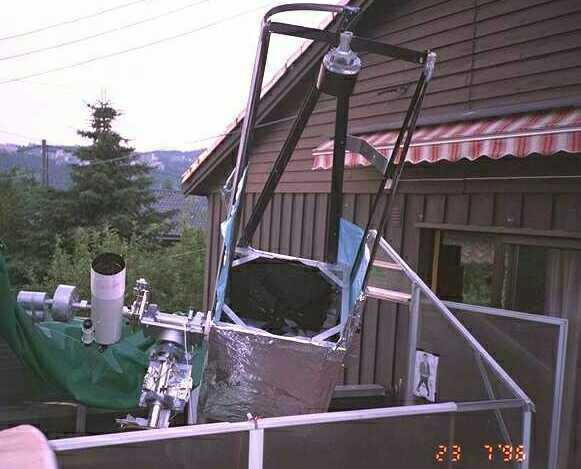
This telescope was built for visual work, but is also used with different CCD detectors. Optical design 0.61m f/15 Cassegrain Nasmyth... Observatory code 238. Oslo Norway

The Cassegrain Nasmyth telescope has the same optical design as the classical Cassegrain telescope except for a small tertiary mirror which sends out the light on the side of the telescope tube instead of through a hole in the primary mirror. This design is common in large telescopes, e.g., the W. M. Keck Observatory.

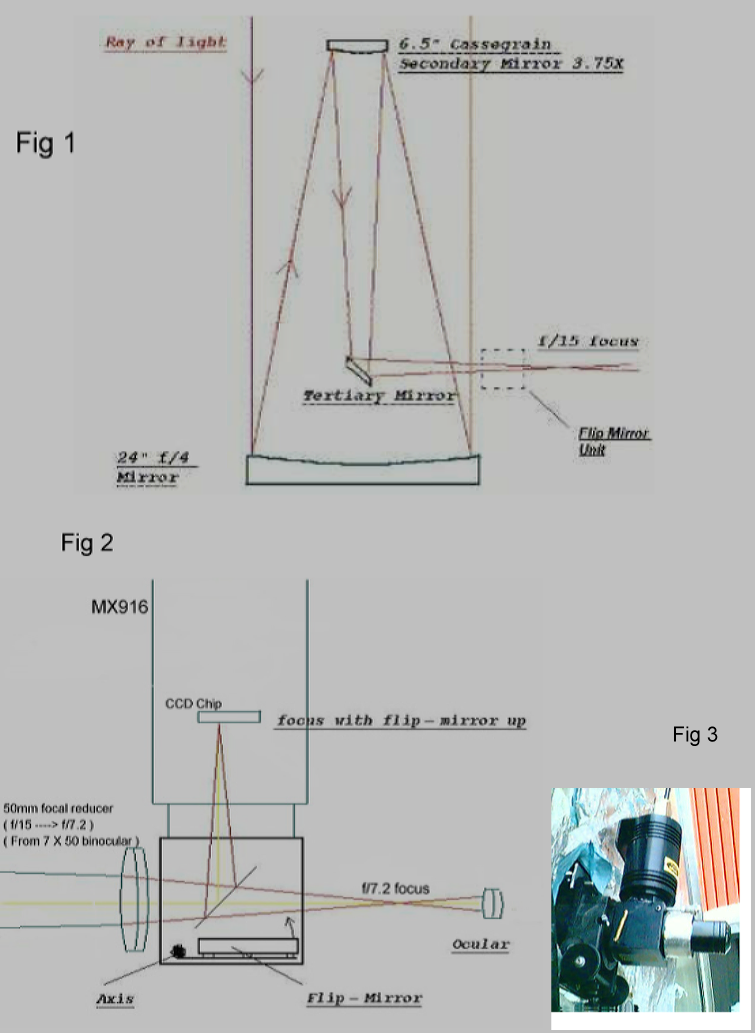

Figure 1 shows the light-path from a star based on the 0.61m telescope in Oslo. Figures 2 and 3 show the use of a focal reducer, flip mirror unit, ocular and CCD camera. See also: Nasmyth telescope.
