= Mae Soi =

Mae Soi แม่สอย
- Tambon
- Country: Thailand
- Province: Chiang Mai
- District: Chom Thong

Population (2005)
  - Total: 8,715
- Time zone: UTC+7 (ICT)

Mae Soi (Thai: แม่สอย) is a tambon (subdistrict) of Chom Thong District, in Chiang Mai Province, Thailand. In 2005 it had a population of 8,715 people. The tambon contains 14 villages.
