= Ban Pae =

Coordinates: 18.2108°N 98.6164°E

Ban Pae บ้านแปะ
- Tambon
- Interactive map of Ban Pae
- Country: Thailand
- Province: Chiang Mai
- District: Chom Thong

Population (2022)
  - Total: 12,050
- Time zone: UTC+7 (ICT)

Ban Pae (Thai: บ้านแปะ) is a tambon (subdistrict) of Chom Thong District, in Chiang Mai Province, Thailand. In 2005, it had a population of 12,050 people. The tambon contains 18 villages.
