= Doi Kaeo =

Coordinates: 18.4014°N 98.6541°E

Doi Kaeo ดอยแก้ว
- Tambon
- Interactive map of Doi Kaeo
- Country: Thailand
- Province: Chiang Mai
- District: Chom Thong

Population (2005)
  - Total: 5,128
- Time zone: UTC+7 (ICT)

Doi Kaeo (Thai: ดอยแก้ว) is a tambon (subdistrict) of Chom Thong District, in Chiang Mai Province, Thailand. In 2005, it had a population of 5,128 people. The tambon contains nine villages.
