= Ajahn Tong Sirimangalo =

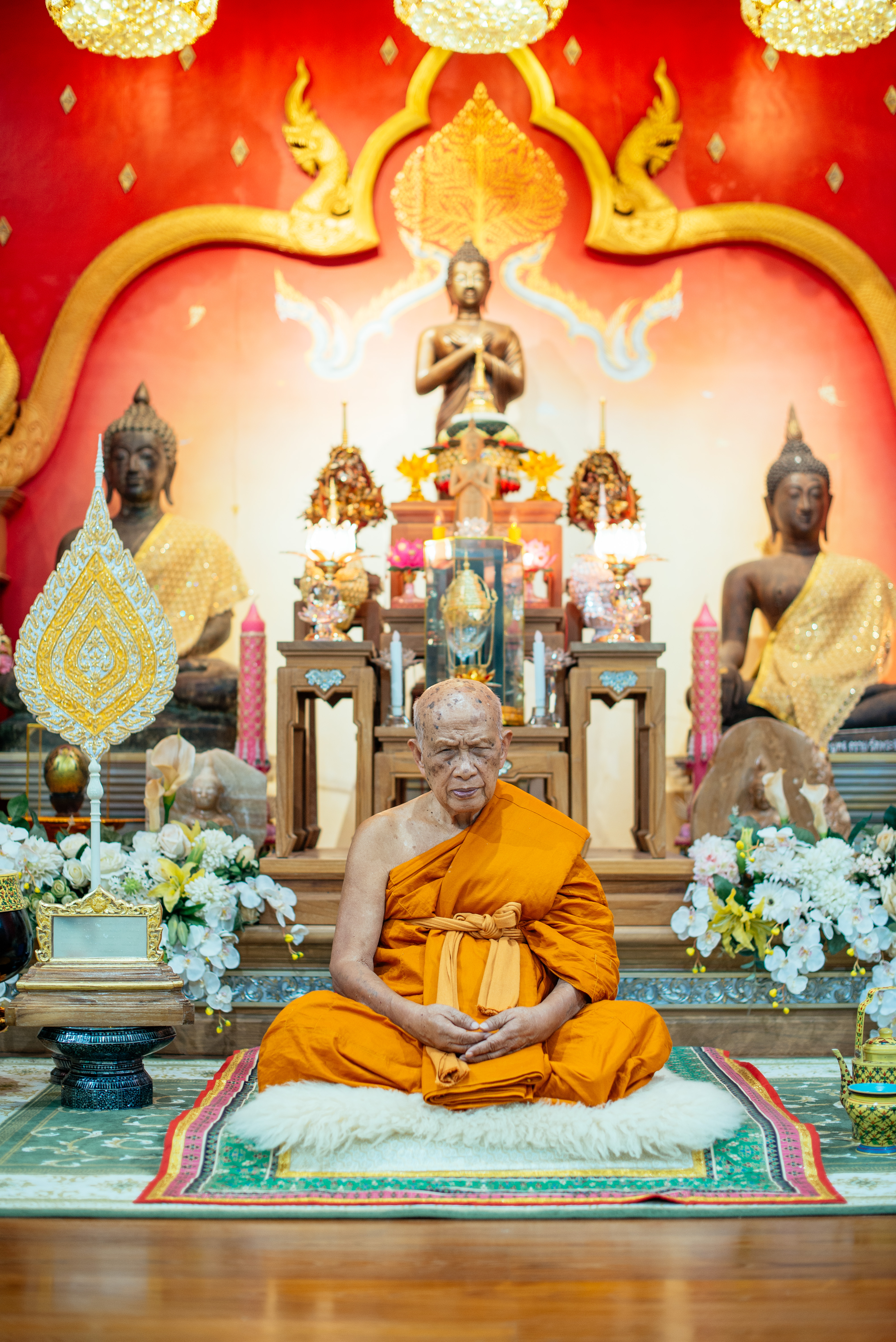
- Ajahn Tong Sirimangalo
- Title: Phra Phrom Mongkhon

Personal life
- Born: Thong Phromsaen; 21 September 1923 Ban Na Kaeng, Hot District, Chiang Mai Province, Siam
- Died: 13 December 2019 (aged 96) Chiang Mai, Thailand
- Occupation: Bhikkhu (monk)

Religious life
- Religion: Buddhism
- School: Theravada
- Dharma name: Sirimaṅgalo

Senior posting
- Teacher: Mahasi Sayadaw
- Based in: Wat Phra That Si Chom Thong Worawihan

Ajahn Tong Sirimangalo (born Thong Phromsaen, Thai: ทอง พรหมเสน; 21 September 1923 – 13 December 2019) was a Thai Theravada Buddhist monk and vipassanā meditation teacher. From 2016 he held the ecclesiastical title Phra Phrom Mongkhon (Thai: พระพรหมมงคล; RTGS: phra phrom mongkhon), the rank of chao khana rong and the second-highest grade of the Thai monastic hierarchy below that of somdet; in Thailand he is commonly cited by that title. He was abbot of Wat Phra That Si Chom Thong Worawihan in Chiang Mai Province from 1991 until his death, and is credited with establishing one of the most widely disseminated lineages of Mahāsī-style satipaṭṭhāna practice outside Myanmar, with affiliated centres in Europe, Israel and the Americas.

In 2016 he received the ecclesiastical title Phra Phrom Mongkhon, corresponding to the grade of phra racha khana chao khana rong in the vipassanā-dhura (meditation) division of the Maha Nikaya. This is the second-highest grade in the Thai monastic hierarchy, below only that of somdet, the tier from which the country's Supreme Patriarch is chosen. Ajahn Tong was also the first monk raised to that grade to be granted the special ceremonial fan reserved for senior monks of the meditation division.

== Early life and ordination ==
Thong Phromsaen was born on Friday 21 September 1923 in the village of Ban Na Kaeng, Hot District, Chiang Mai Province, in what was then Siam. His parents were Tha and Taem Phromsaen, and he was the fifth of six children. His family descended from local nobility: his great-grandfather was the nobleman Phraya Bibidhasena.

He was ordained as a novice (sāmaṇera) on 19 January 1934 at Wat Na Kaeng, with Phra Khruba Chaiwong (Khruba Kaeo Chayawangso), abbot of that temple, as his preceptor. Ten years later, on 7 February 1944, he received higher ordination (upasampadā) at Ban Aen, with Phra Khru Khamphirathamma (Khruba Inta Phrommapanyo), abbot of Wat Chai Phrakiat, as preceptor. He was given the monastic name Sirimaṅgalo.

He completed the three levels of the Thai monastic curriculum in Pali studies (nak tham), attaining the highest grade, nak tham ek, in 1944.

== Meditation training ==
Between 1934 and 1943 Ajahn Tong trained in samatha practice under several northern Thai teachers, among them Phra Sutthammayanathera (Intha Inthachakko), Phra Suphrommayanathera (Phromma Phrommachakko) and Khruba Aphichai (Khao Pi). His own tradition also counts Khruba Siwichai, the most venerated Lanna monk of the twentieth century, among his early teachers.

In 1953 he took up vipassanā in the fourfold satipaṭṭhāna method at Wat Mahathat Yuwaratrangsarit in Bangkok under Phra Thammathirarachamahamuni (Chodok Ñāṇasiddhi), the monk chiefly responsible for introducing the Burmese Mahāsī method into Thailand. From 1954 to 1957 he studied and practised the method in Burma on the basis of the Tipiṭaka and its commentaries, and in 1957 he practised directly under Mahasi Sayadaw at the Sāsana Yeiktha meditation centre in Rangoon. His stay in Burma lasted two years and seven months, after which he returned to Chiang Mai to teach vipassanā.

== Monastic offices ==
In 1954 he established the first vipassanā centre in Chiang Mai at Wat Mueang Mang. He served as abbot of that monastery from 1948 to 1988, and as ecclesiastical head (chao khana amphoe) of Hot District from 1967 to 2007. He was appointed a preceptor (upajjhāya) in 1968. From 1988 to 1991 he was abbot of Wat Tapotaram, also known as Wat Ram Poeng, and in 1991 he became abbot of Wat Phra That Si Chom Thong Worawihan, a royal monastery in Chom Thong District, a position he held until his death.

Wat Phra That Si Chom Thong is a Thai royal temple regarded as national heritage, and houses a relic attributed to the Buddha. In 2003 he was appointed head of the first provincial dhamma practice centre of Chiang Mai Province. He served as adviser to the ecclesiastical governor of Chiang Mai Province from 2007 to 2014 and as adviser to the ecclesiastical governor of Region 7 from 2014. In 2011 he became an adviser to the office supervising Thai Buddhist missionaries abroad, and in 2016 he was made chairman for the northern region of the national "villages observing the five precepts" programme.

== International dissemination ==
Ajahn Tong played a central part in the international spread of Theravada vipassanā meditation. He taught for more than fifty years, came to oversee teaching at over fifty monasteries and meditation centres in northern Thailand, and served as spiritual guide to centres in more than eleven countries. From the beginning of the 1980s he led courses in Europe and the United States, and in 1993 a meditation centre was established within Wat Phra That Si Chom Thong.

In 2000 an international department for foreign meditators, known as Northern Vipassana, opened at the monastery. It was founded by Thanat and Kathryn Chindaporn under Ajahn Tong's guidance; both had been his disciples since the mid-1980s and went on to train many vipassanā teachers in other countries. The centre draws teachers from Canada, the United States, Germany and South Africa, and Ajahn Tong authorised several teachers trained under him to teach the method abroad.

Centres teaching his interpretation of the fourfold satipaṭṭhāna method were subsequently founded in a number of countries, including Germany, Switzerland, France and Israel. The lineage also took root in Latin America, where groups practising in the Chom Thong tradition operate in Mexico, Colombia and Argentina.

=== Disciples ===
Western monks ordained under his guidance include Yuttadhammo Bhikkhu, born Noah Greenspoon in Ontario, Canada, who ordained at Wat Phra That Si Chom Thong in 2001. He has taught intensive meditation since 2003 in Thailand, Sri Lanka, the United States and Canada, and founded Sirimangalo International, a registered charity in Ontario dedicated to supporting practice and teaching in Ajahn Tong's tradition. His manual How to Meditate: A Beginner's Guide to Peace has been translated into close to twenty languages.

== Ecclesiastical ranks ==
In the Thai monastic hierarchy, ecclesiastical ranks (samanasak) are titles conferred by the king on the recommendation of the Sangha Supreme Council, traditionally granted on 5 December. Each title is awarded within one of two branches: that of the texts (gantha-dhura, the scholarly path) or that of meditation (vipassanā-dhura), the latter marked by the abbreviation wi. (วิ.) appended to the title. All of Ajahn Tong's appointments fell within the meditation branch.

Above the entry grade of phra khru sanyabat, the phra racha khana scale ascends through the grades saman (ordinary), rat, thep and tham to chao khana rong, immediately below somdet, the highest rank under the Supreme Patriarch. At the chao khana rong grade the title is inscribed on a hiraññapaṭṭa, a silver plaque; the somdet grade uses a gold one instead.

His successive appointments, as recorded by the Thai Sangha administrative registry and by the IdRef authority file, which lists the sequence of his titles, were:

- 1968 – phra khru sanyabat, with the title Phra Khru Phiphat Khanaphiban. The first tier of royally conferred titles, tied to district-level administrative duties.
- 1983 – phra khru sanyabat of special class. A promotion within the same tier.
- 1990 – phra racha khana of saman (ordinary) grade, with the title Phra Suphrommayanathera. Entry into the senior dignitary ranks of the Sangha.
- 1999 – rat grade, with the title Phra Ratcha Phrommachan. The second grade of the scale.
- 2005 – thep grade, with the title Phra Thep Sitthachan. The third grade.
- 2009 – tham grade, with the title Phra Thammamangkhalachan. The fourth grade, the highest below the dignity of chao khana rong.
- 2016 – chao khana rong, with the title Phra Phrom Mongkhon inscribed on a hiraññapaṭṭa. The second-highest dignity in the Thai Sangha, below only somdet.

All of the appointments were conferred on 5 December of the year in question.

He also received honorary titles from abroad: in 1990 from the Rāmañña Mahā Nikāya council of Sri Lanka, and in 2011 the Burmese title Aggamahākammaṭṭhānācariya.

== Honours ==
Ajahn Tong received honorary doctorates from Mahachulalongkornrajavidyalaya University in Buddhist studies (1993), North-Chiang Mai University in development administration (2011), Chiang Mai Rajabhat University in philosophy (2012) and Mahamakut Buddhist University in religious studies (2013).

In 1994 he received a plaque and honorary badge for outstanding conservation of Thai heritage in language and literature from Princess Maha Chakri Sirindhorn, and in 1995 a ceremonial fan of rank for outstanding development work from the Supreme Patriarch Somdet Phra Nyanasamvara. In 2010 he was awarded the Phutthakhunupakan prize by the House of Representatives.

== Death ==
Ajahn Tong died on 13 December 2019 at Wat Phra That Si Chom Thong Worawihan at the age of 96, having completed 76 vassa.

== Works ==
His teachings were published mainly in Thai, with some translated into English. Titles catalogued under his name in the United States Library of Congress and in the French union catalogue Sudoc include:

- Khūmư̄ kānpatibat wipatsanā kammathān nai nǣo satipatthān 4 (คู่มือการปฏิบัติวิปัสสนากรรมฐานในแนวสติปัฏฐาน ๔), a manual of vipassanā practice in the fourfold satipaṭṭhāna method
- Thāng sāi ēk (ทางสายเอก), also published in English as The Only Way: The Vipassana Meditation Teachings and as Path to Nibbana
- Pœ̄t pratū nipphān (เปิดประตูนิพพาน), "Opening the door to nibbāna"
- Kān dœ̄nthāng ʿǭk čhāk khwām khœ̄ichin (การเดินทางออกจากความเคยชิน), "The journey out of habit"
- Thamma čhāk Lūang Pū (ธรรมะจากหลวงปู่), "Dhamma from Luang Pu"
- Ngān phœ̄iphrǣ phraphutthasāsanā nai tāng prathēt (งานเผยแพร่พระพุทธศาสนาในต่างประเทศ), on the propagation of Buddhism abroad

Commemorative volumes were also published to mark his anniversaries and promotions, among them one issued in 1998 for his 75th birthday and another in 2005 for his elevation to the thep grade.

== See also ==
- Mahasi Sayadaw
- Vipassana movement
- Buddhism in Thailand
