= Ban Luang, Chom Thong =

Coordinates: 18.4901°N 98.6747°E

Ban Luang บ้านหลวง
- Tambon
- Interactive map of Ban Luang
- Country: Thailand
- Province: Chiang Mai
- District: Chom Thong

Population (2005)
  - Total: 15,618
- Time zone: UTC+7 (ICT)

Ban Luang (Thai: บ้านหลวง) is a tambon (subdistrict) of Chom Thong District, in Chiang Mai Province, Thailand. Ban Mae Klang Luang can be divided into 4 villages: Ban Mae Klang Luang, Ban Pha Hmon, Ban Nong Lom, and Ban Ang Ka Noi. In 2005, it had a population of 15,618 people. The tambon contains 23 villages.
