= Yuttadhammo Bhikkhu =

Canadian Theravada Buddhist monk

- Title: President of Sirimangalo International

Personal life
- Born: Noah Greenspoon
- Occupation: Buddhist monk, meditation teacher
- Website: sirimangalo.org

Religious life
- Religion: Buddhism
- School: Theravada, Maha Nikaya
- Lineage: Mahasi Sayadaw tradition
- Dharma name: Yuttadhammo

Senior posting
- Teacher: Ven. Ajahn Tong Sirimangalo
- Based in: Ratnapura, Sri Lanka

Yuttadhammo Bhikkhu (born Noah Greenspoon) is a Canadian Theravada Buddhist monk of the Mahasi Sayadaw tradition, ordained in 2001 under the guidance of the Venerable Ajahn Tong Sirimangalo. He is known for his online vipassana meditation teachings, for the Digital Pali Reader, a reading tool for the Pali Canon used by students and translators, and for the podcasts Ask a Monk and Sutta Talks.

== Biography ==
Born in Ice Lake, Ontario, Greenspoon studied Pali, Sanskrit and Indian religion at McMaster University and the University of Toronto. He began intensive meditation practice in January 2000 and was ordained as a monk (bhikkhu) in 2001 in Chiang Mai, Thailand, under the guidance of the Venerable Ajaan Tong Sirimangalo, following the meditation tradition of the Mahasi Sayadaw. He completed formal studies of the Dhamma, Abhidhamma and Pali at Wat Phra That Si Chom Thong, in the Thai province of Chiang Mai. With more than twenty years since his higher ordination, he holds the rank of mahathera ("great elder"), the honorific used in Theravada Buddhism for monks who have completed at least twenty years in the monastic life.

Since 2003 he has taught intensive meditation in Thailand, Sri Lanka, the United States and Canada, giving teachings in both English and Thai. In Canada he first lived in Manitoba (2013), where he taught and led meditation events in Winnipeg. In 2015 he launched the Buddhism Association at McMaster University and a monastery in Hamilton, Ontario. He founded Sirimangalo International, a charity registered in Ontario, Canada, of which he is president. Its monastery and meditation centre is in Ratnapura, Sri Lanka, where he lives and teaches.

== Online teachings and outreach ==
Yuttadhammo spreads his teachings mainly through the internet. His YouTube channel, active since 2007, and his podcasts Ask a Monk and Sutta Talks have gathered hundreds of episodes on meditation, the Pali Canon and Buddhist practice; the American magazine Tricycle: The Buddhist Review noted in 2011 that Ask a Monk had surpassed one million views. He also maintains an online meditation site with video courses.

His outreach has reached beyond Buddhism: in 2014 he was invited by the community of Assumption College to lead a two-day meditation workshop, and in 2022 he took part in the interfaith programme "Mission: Joy" of the ecumenical chaplaincy at Brock University (St. Catharines), together with the Reverend Krista Hilton.

== Digital Pali Reader ==
Yuttadhammo is the creator of the Digital Pali Reader, an application that allows reading the Pali Canon with integrated dictionaries (PED, CPED and others) and word lookup, available for desktop, Android and web browser. Its launch was announced in January 2006. The tool is recommended in Pali resource lists of Buddhist educational institutions; the Open Buddhist University catalogues it as "essential for anyone working on translating the Pāli Canon" and its texts have been reused in technical projects for Pali language processing.

== Works ==
- How to Meditate: A Beginner's Guide to Peace (2010), originally written for a programme at the Los Angeles federal prison and translated into more than twenty languages.
- Lessons in Practical Buddhism.
- Enlightenment (a series from Ask a Monk, 2020), in English and Spanish.

== Reception ==
In a chapter on digital tools for Buddhist studies, Marcus Bingenheimer described the Digital Pali Reader as "the best way to use" the Vipassana Research Institute corpus of Pali texts. His writings on monastic discipline have also been discussed in academic literature: in Buddhist-Christian Studies (2013), Carol S. Anderson cites his blog post on monks and money in a discussion of Buddhist ethics of wealth.

His work has also been discussed in other academic contexts. Richardson and Mueller analyse his explanations of enlightenment in Language and Cognition (Cambridge University Press), and a 2025 article in the journal of the Faculty of Buddhism of Komazawa University describes the Digital Pali Reader as a project of Sirimangalo International, the organisation he founded in Ontario.

== See also ==
- Ajahn Tong Sirimangalo
- Mahasi Sayadaw
- Samatha-vipassanā
- Thero
