= Flip mirror =

Mirror used in optical instrumentation

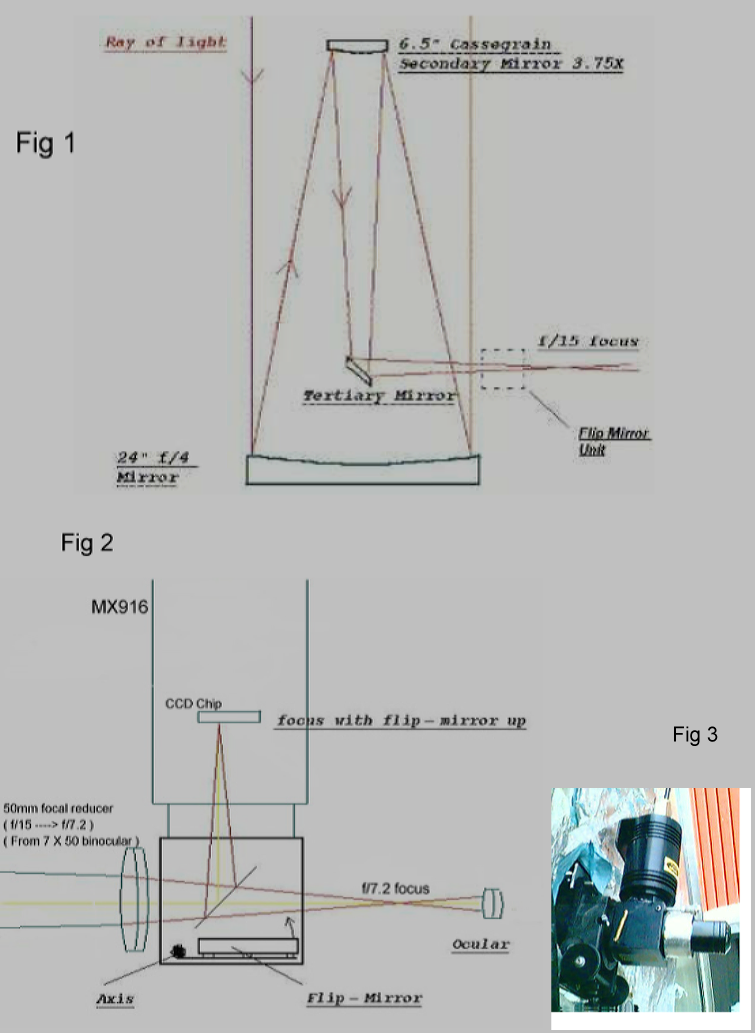
Fig 1,2 and 3

A flip mirror unit is used on astronomical telescopes and other optical instruments in order to send the light from an object in a new direction using a small mirror which can be moved into the lightbeam. It is a mirror-diagonal that can hold both a camera and an eyepiece and allows the view to be switched between them by moving a mirror in or out of the light path. It can be used to center the object image in the camera and assist in focusing it. It can also be used in 35-mm photography if it is large enough to allow the entire field of view to reach the camera.

In the case of a CCD camera, the flip mirror system works to let the viewer see exactly what the camera will see. In this setup, the flip mirror is used as an accessory that helps to aim and focus. The device is inserted into the telescope drawtube just before the CCD camera. Operated through a small lever, the mirror can direct the light at right angles into a viewing piece when actuated "up" or free the light from the telescope to pass into the CCD camera when it is flipped "down".

There are instances when a flip prism as an alternative to the flip mirror.
