= Doi Inthanon =

Highest mountain in Thailand

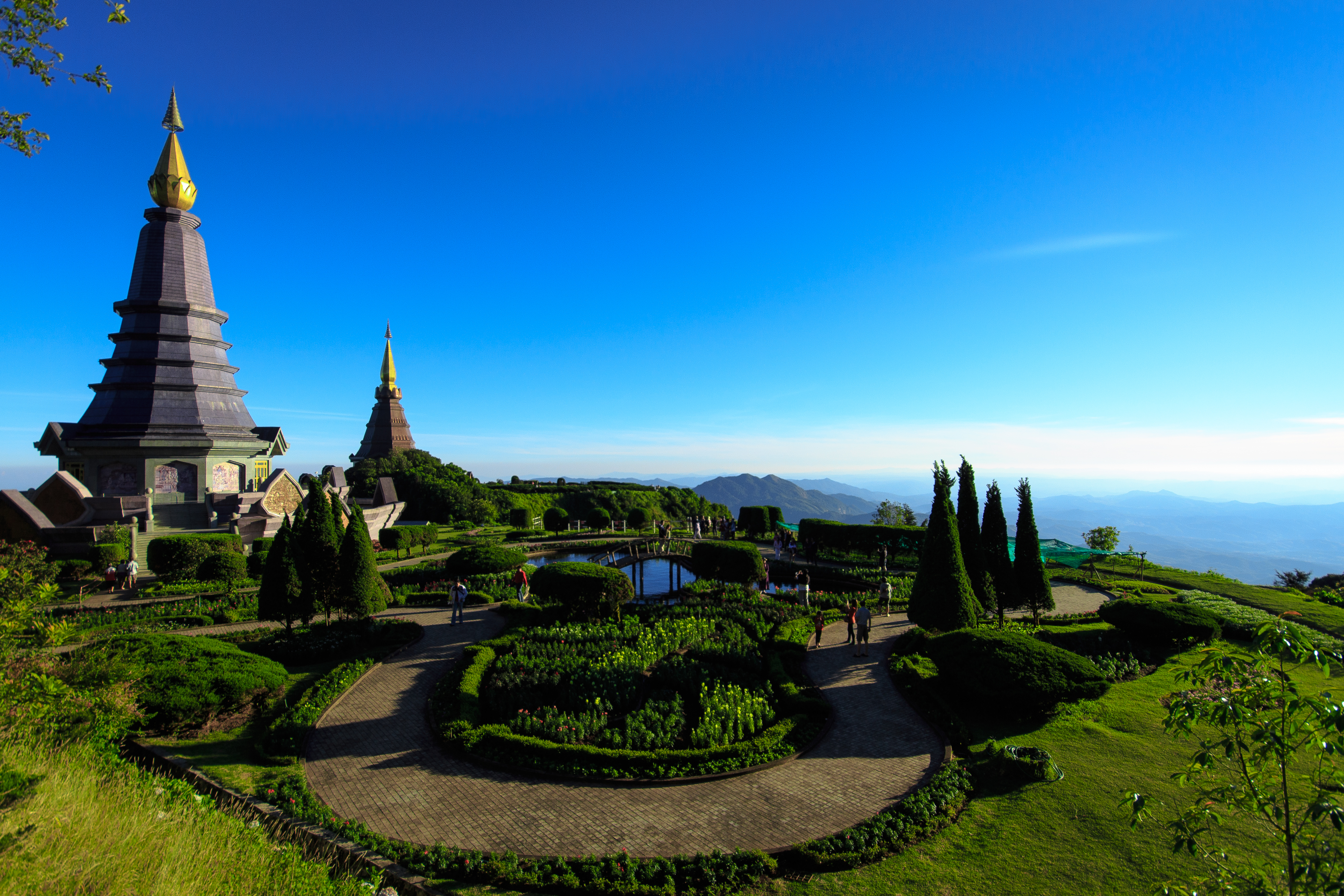
- Naphamethinidon and Naphaphonphumisiri, two chedis near the summit of Doi Inthanon

Highest point
- Elevation: 2,565 m (8,415 ft)
- Prominence: 1,835 m (6,020 ft)
- Listing: Country high point List of Ultras of Southeast Asia; Ribu
- Coordinates: 18°35′15″N 98°29′12″E

Geography
- Location within Thailand
- Location: Chiang Mai, Thailand
- Parent range: Shan Hills

Geology
- Mountain type: granite batholith

Climbing
- Easiest route: drive

Doi Inthanon (Thai: ดอยอินทนนท์, pronounced [dɔ̄ːj ʔīn.tʰā.nōn]) is the highest mountain in Thailand. It is in Chom Thong District, Chiang Mai Province. This mountain is an ultra prominent peak, known in the past as Doi Luang Ang Ga (Grand Mount Ang Ga) or meaning the 'crow's pond top'. Near the mountain's base was a pond where many crows gathered. The name Doi Inthanon was given in honour of Inthawichayanon, Grand Prince of Chiang Mai, who was concerned about the forests in the north and tried to preserve them. After his death, his remains were interred at Doi Luang, which was then renamed in his honour.

Today, the summit of Doi Inthanon is a popular tourist destination for both foreign and Thai tourists, with a peak of 12,000 visitors visiting the summit on New Year's Day. In addition to a range of tourist facilities on the summit, there is a weather station operated by the Royal Thai Air Force, with the Thai National Observatory also based there.

== Geography ==
Doi Inthanon is the highest peak of the Inthanon Range (Thai: ทิวเขาอินทนนท์) of the Thanon Thong Chai Range, a subrange of the Shan Hills in the Thai highlands stretching southwards from the Daen Lao Range. This range, the southwesternmost of the Shan Highland system, separates the Salween watershed from the Mekong watershed. Other high peaks of the Daen Lao Range are Doi Luang Chiang Dao (2,175 metres (7,136 ft)), Doi Pui (1,685 metres (5,528 ft)), and Doi Suthep (1,601 metres (5,253 ft)).

In 1954, the forests around Doi Inthanon were conserved, creating Doi Inthanon National Park, as one of the original 14 national parks of Thailand. This park now covers 482.4 km^{2} and spreads from the lowlands at 800 metres (2,625 ft) elevation up to the peak at 2,565 metres (8,415 ft). Given the varied climatic and ecological areas regions, the park supports a range of animal species, including around 500 bird species.

On the lower slopes of Doi Inthanon, near the Karen hill tribe village, Ban Sop Had, are the Wachirathan waterfalls (Thai: น้ำตกวชิรธาร), where the Wachirathan (lit. "Diamond Creek") tumbles over a granite escarpment. (18.541790°N 98.599247°E)

== Climate ==
The climate is typically tropical and fairly cool on the summit of Doi Inthanon. In the winter, the average temperature is 6 °C (43 °F) in January and temperatures can sometimes drop below 0 °C (32 °F). On 21 December 2017, an all-time low temperature of −5 °C (23 °F) was recorded at 06:30 at km 44.4. From March to June, temperatures are pleasant, especially at higher altitudes. The rainy season runs from April to November when it sometimes rains for more than two hours daily.

== Geology ==
Geologically the mountain is a granite batholith in a north–south oriented mountain range. The second-highest peak of this range is Doi Hua Mot Luang at 2,340 metres (7,677 ft).

== Environmental issues ==
In 2014, visitors to the mountain left behind 36 tonnes (35 long tons; 40 short tons) of rubbish.

== Places ==
- On the summit of Doi Inthanon stands a stupa that contains Inthawichayanon's ashes.
- On the main road to the summit of Doi Inthanon stand two adjacent chedis, one called Naphamethinidon (นภเมทินีดล), meaning 'by the strength of the land and air', and the other, Naphaphonphumisiri (นภพลภูมิสิริ), meaning 'being the strength of the air and the grace of the land'. These temples were built to honor the 60th birth anniversary of King Bhumibol Adulyadej in 1987, and the 60th birth anniversary of Queen Sirikit in 1992, respectively.
- Kio Mae Pan Nature Trail
- The Inthanon Royal Project Research Station: The agricultural station was a King Bhumibol Adulyadej project to help eliminate opium cultivation. It contains a rhododendron garden, and greenhouses for growing ferns, flowering plants, and vegetables.

== Gallery ==
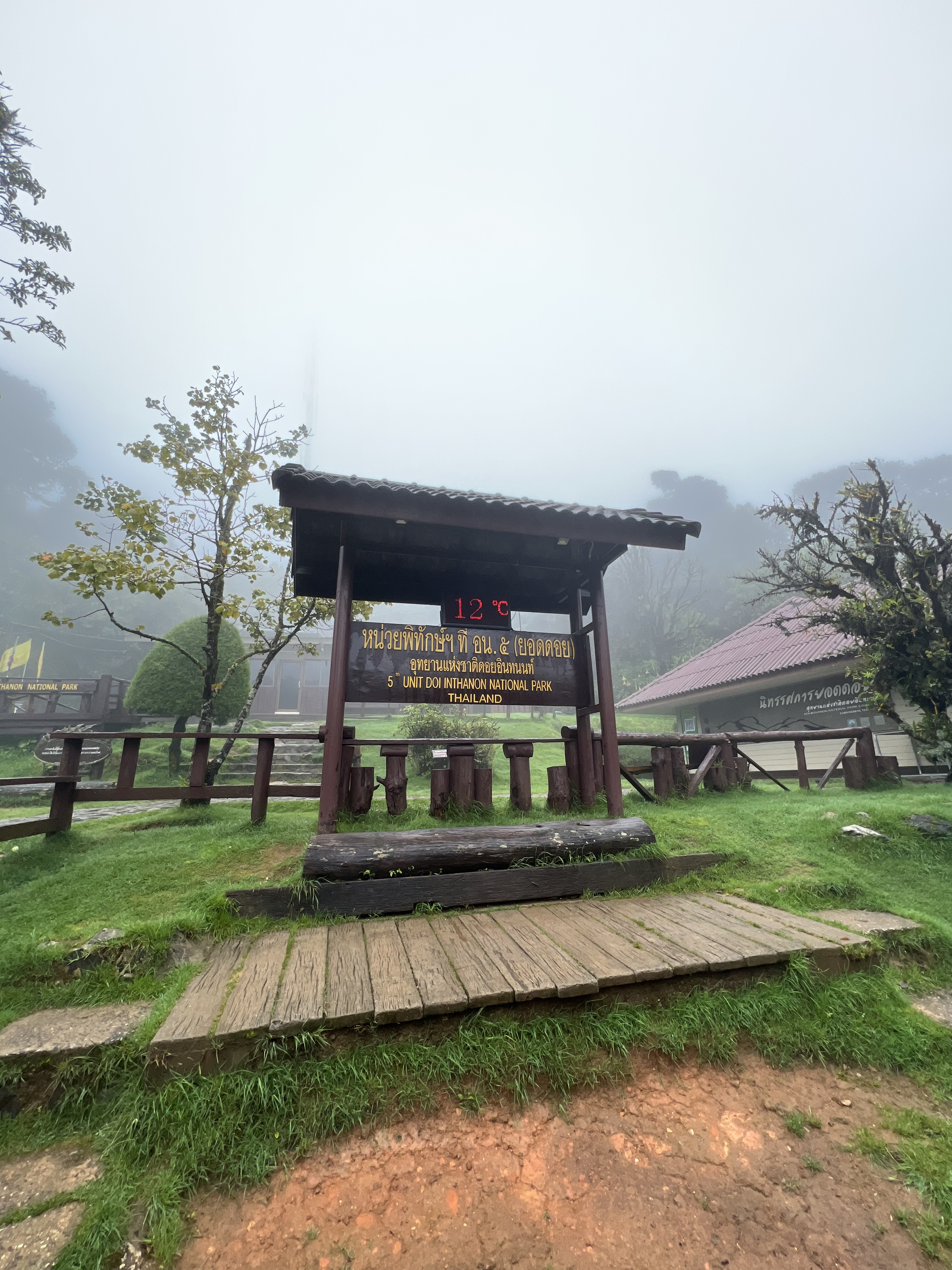
5th Unit Doi Inthanon National Park

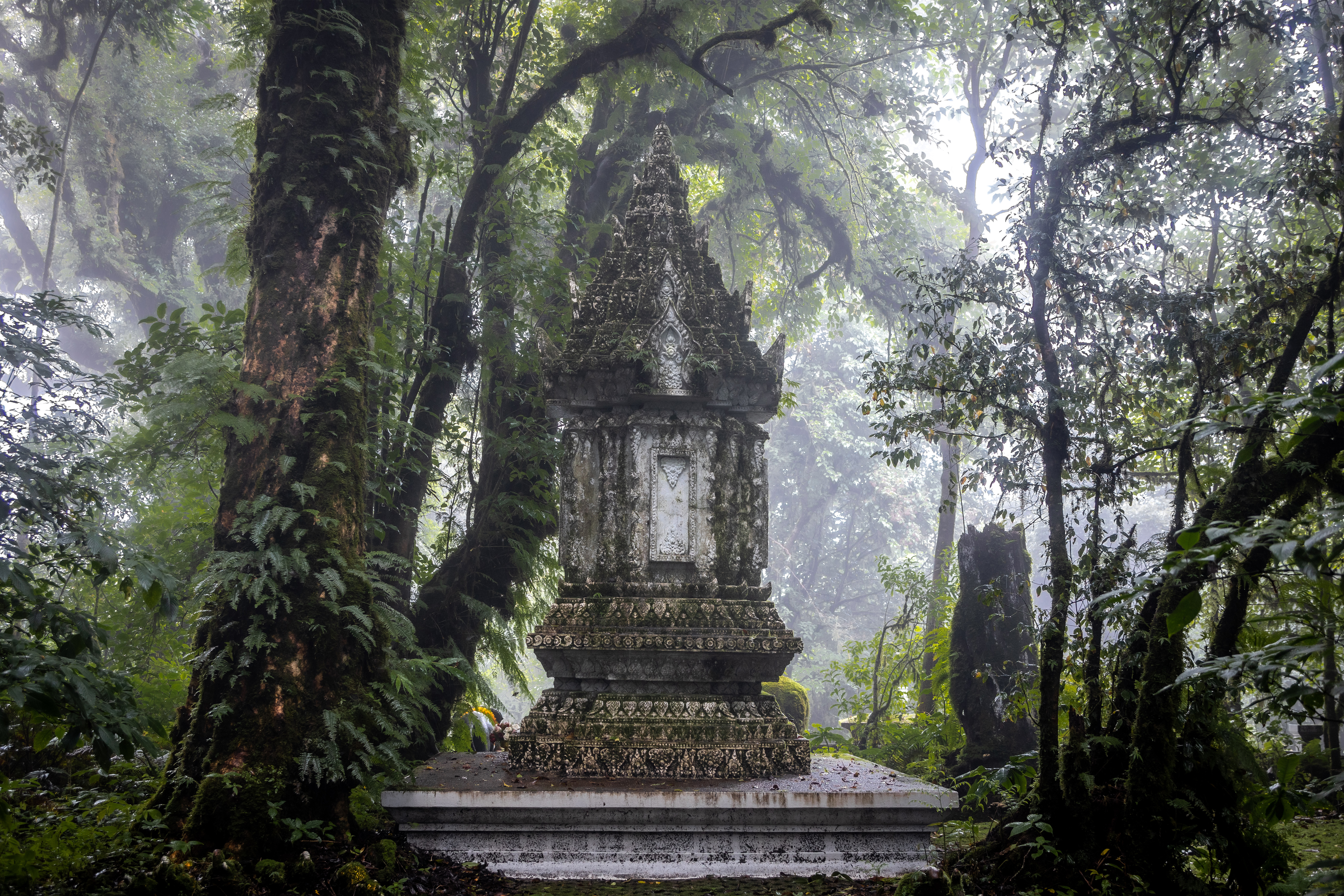
Stupa of Inthawichayanon

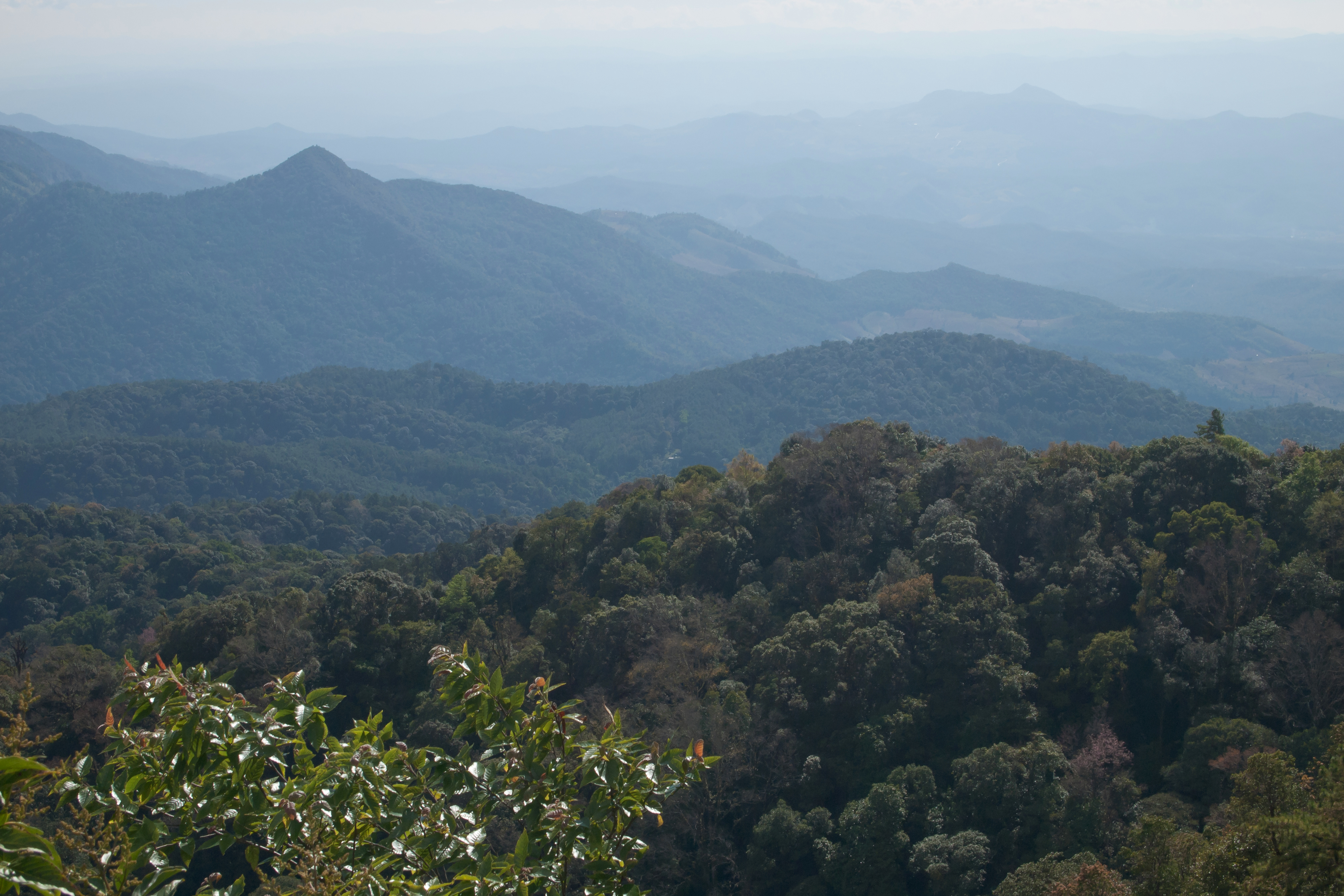
View west from Doi Inthanon

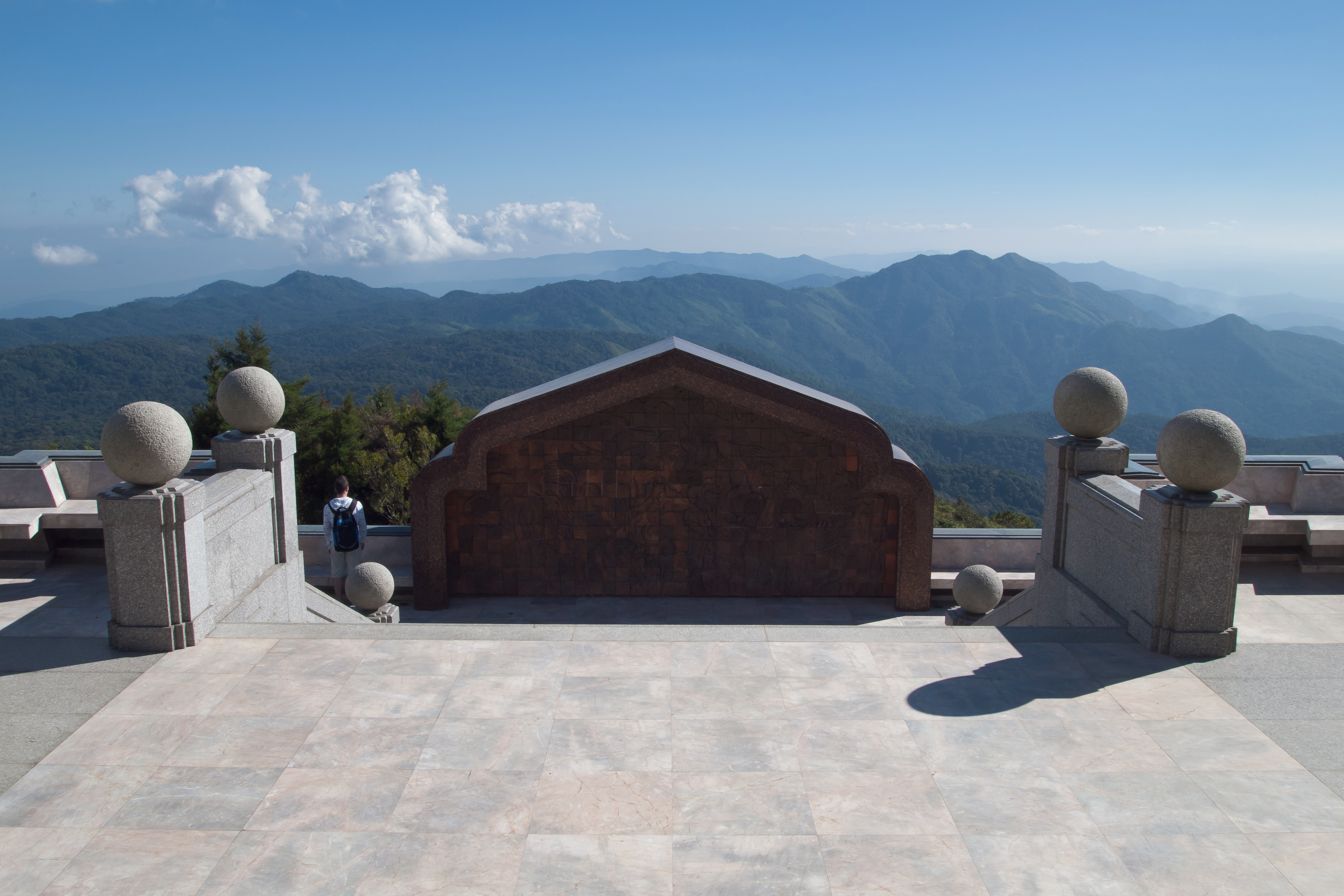
View from the Royal Pagoda

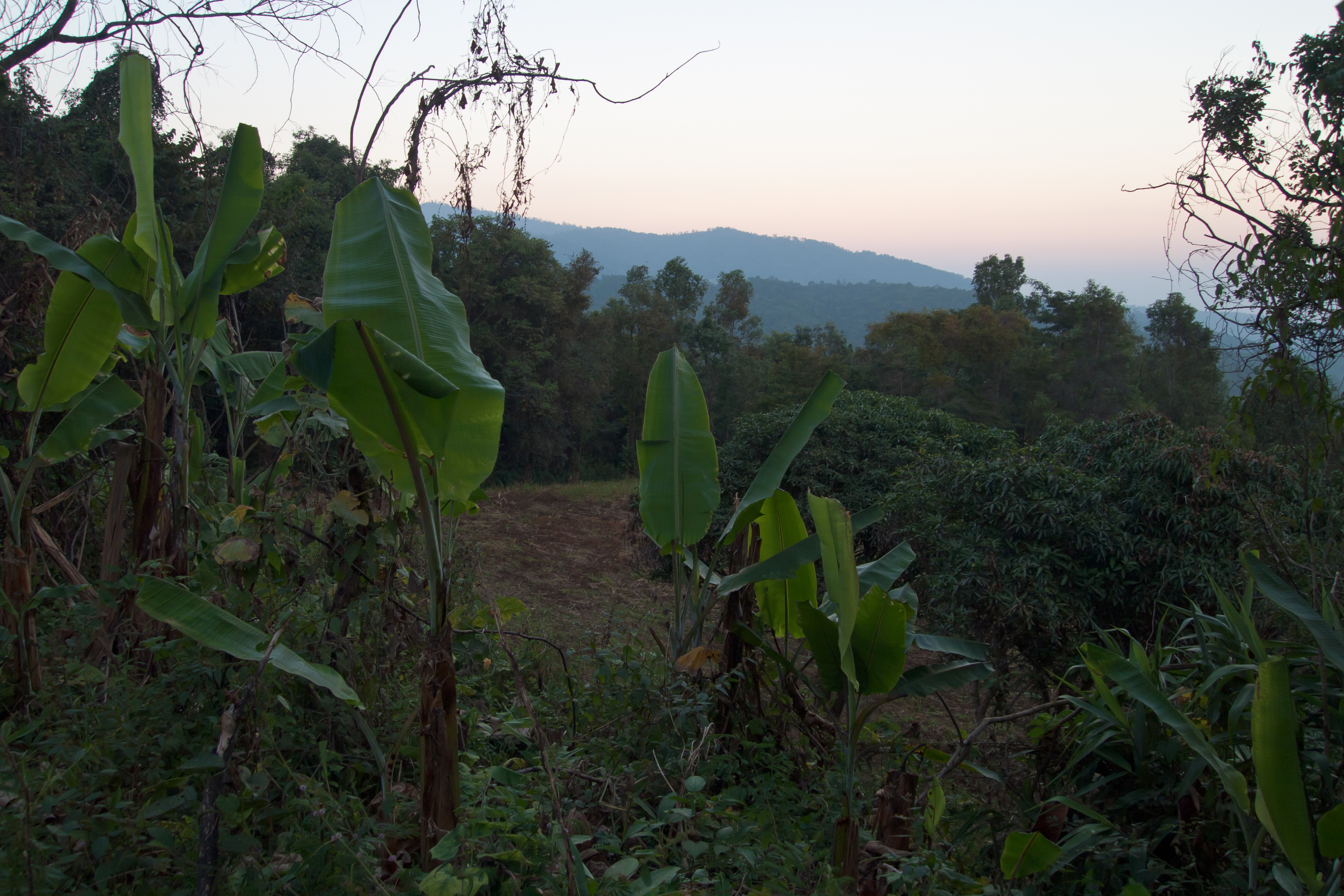
Vegetation on the slopes of Doi Inthanon

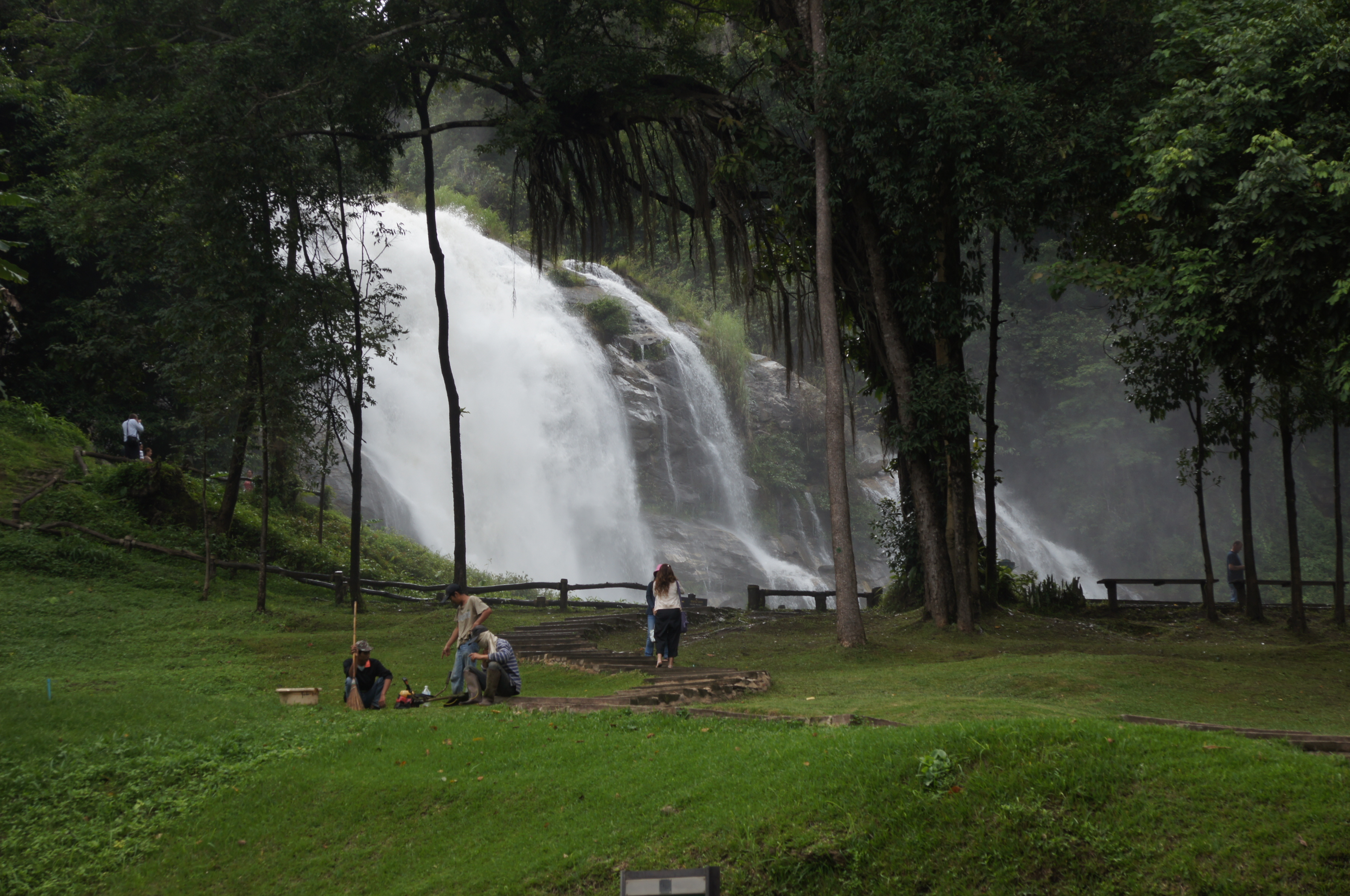
Wachirathan Waterfall

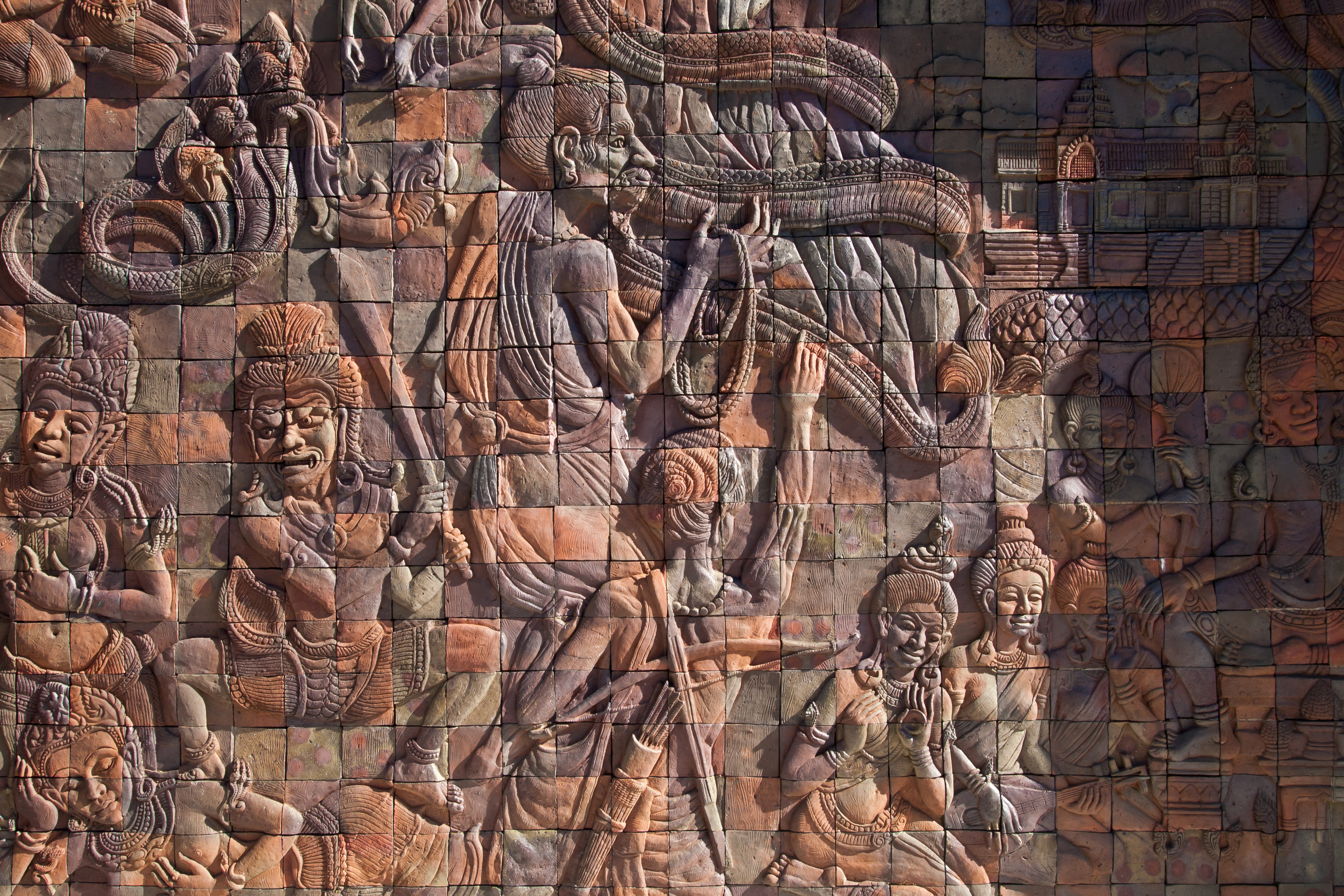
Mural carvings on King's Pagoda

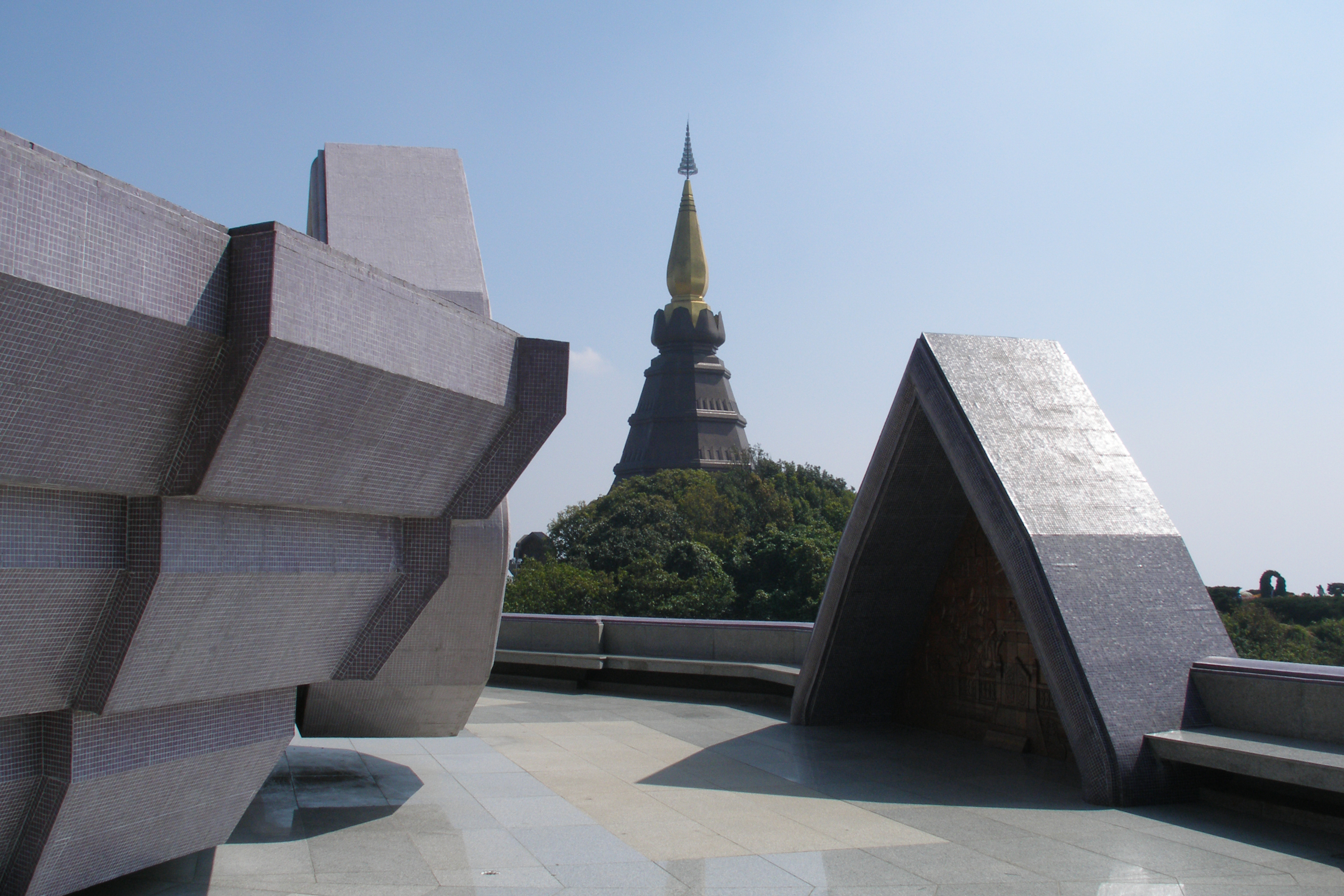
Royal Chedi

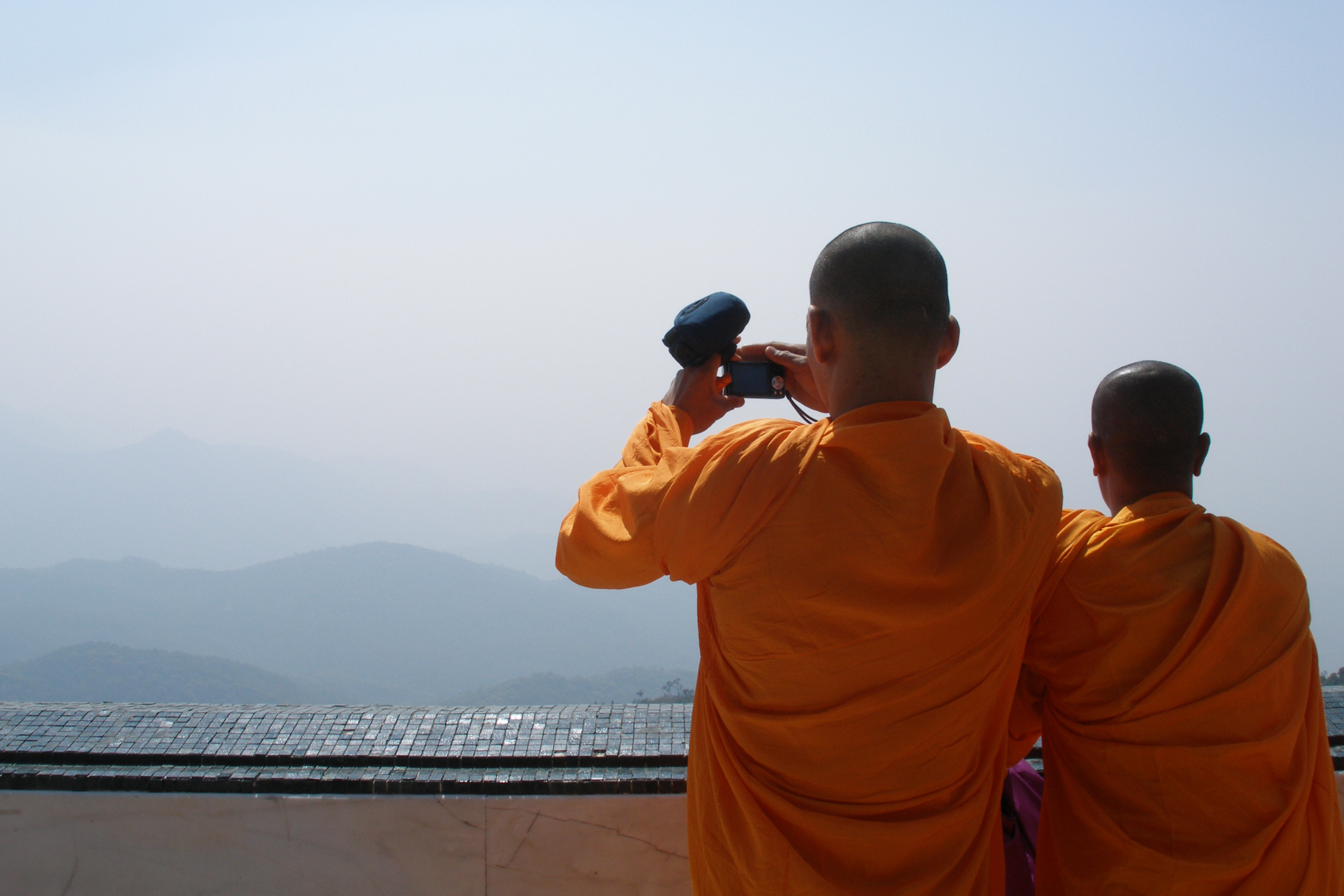
View from the top

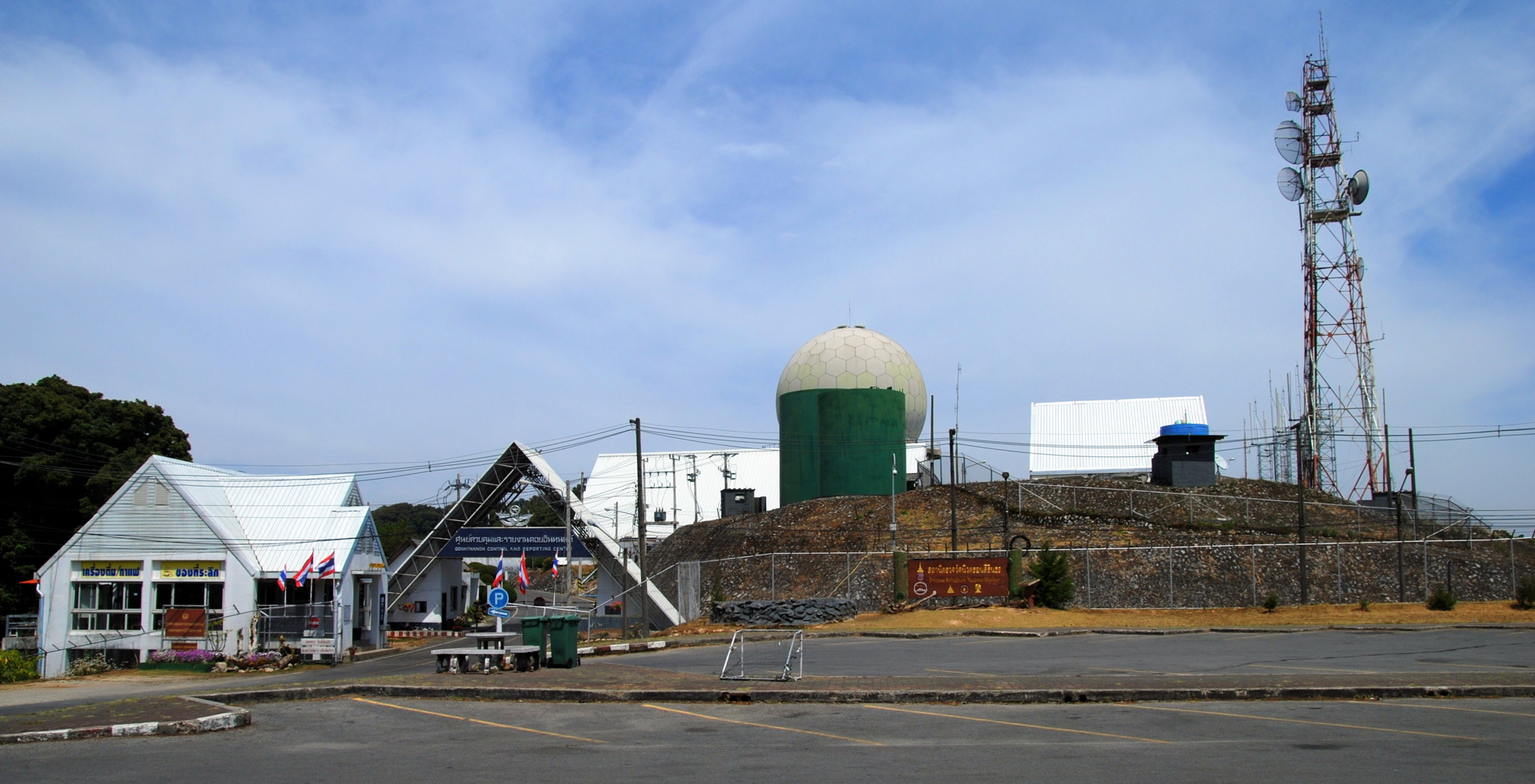
Doi Inthanon control and reporting center on the summit

== See also ==
- List of mountains in Thailand
- List of Southeast Asian mountains
- List of ultras of Southeast Asia
- Doi Inthanon rock frog
- List of elevation extremes by country
