= Chom Thong district, Chiang Mai =

Chom Thong จอมทอง
- District
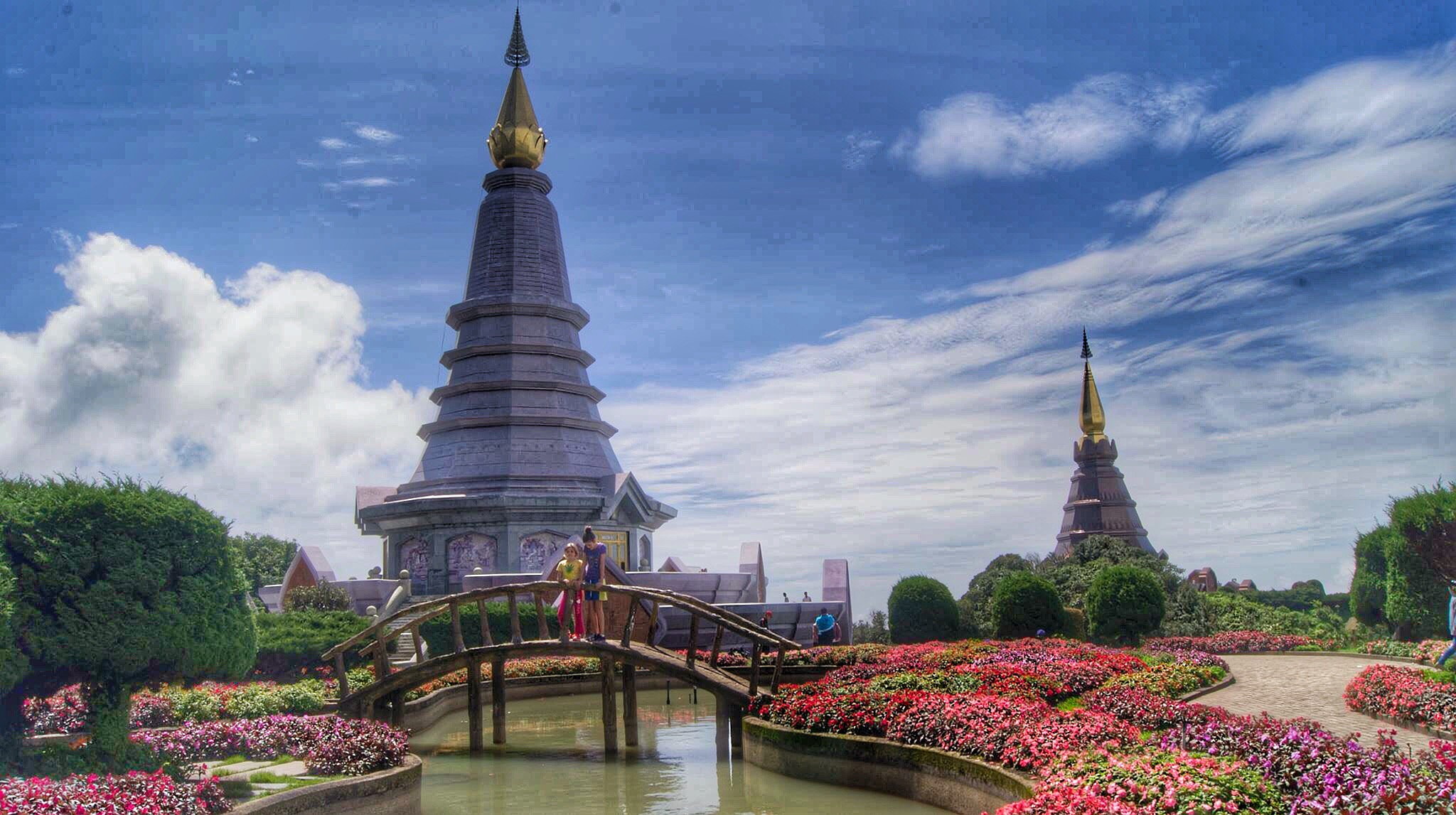
- Royal Twin Pagodas on the summit of Doi Inthanon

- District location in Chiang Mai province
- Coordinates: 18°25′2″N 98°40′33″E
- Country: Thailand
- Province: Chiang Mai

Area
  - Total: 712.297 km^{2} (275.019 sq mi)

Population (2013)
  - Total: 66,353
  - Density: 107.2/km^{2} (278/sq mi)
- Time zone: UTC+7 (ICT)
- Postal code: 50160
- Geocode: 5002

Chom Thong (Thai: จอมทอง, pronounced [tɕɔ̄ːm tʰɔ̄ːŋ]; Northern Thai: ᨧᩬᨾᨴᩬᨦ, pronounced [tɕɔ̌ːm tɔ̄ːŋ]) is a district (amphoe) in the southern part of Chiang Mai province in northern Thailand.

== History ==
According to the legend of Wat Phra That Si Chom Thong Worawihan, the temple is on a small hill which looks similar to a termite hill (chom pluak in Thai). The hill is covered by thong kwao or Bastard teak (Butea monosperma) and Thong Lang or coral tree (Erythrina variegata) forest. Thus the people called the hill Chom Thong.

After Buddha entered parinirvana, King Asoka the Great visited the hill to place Buddha's relics there. The temple was built on the hill and named Wat Phra That Chom Thong in 1451. Later the temple was upgraded to be royal temple and at the same time renamed Wat Phra That Si Chom Thong Worawihan.

The government created a district in the area in 1900 and named the new district Chom Thong following the legend. The district office was originally in Ban Tha Sala, Tambon Khuang Pao. In 1933 the office was moved to the southwest of Wat Phra That Chom Thong.

== Geography ==
Neighbouring districts are (from the south clockwise): Hot, Mae Chaem, Mae Wang, Doi Lo of Chiang Mai Province; Wiang Nong Long, and Ban Hong of Lamphun province.

The important watercourse is the Ping River.

Doi Inthanon National Park is in this district.

== Administration ==
=== Central administration ===
Chom Thong is divided into six sub-districts (tambons), which are further subdivided into 103 administrative villages (mubans).

| No. | Name | Thai | Villages | Pop. |
|---|---|---|---|---|
| 3. | Ban Luang | บ้านหลวง | 23 | 16,550 |
| 4. | Khuang Pao | ข่วงเปา | 15 | 10,833 |
| 5. | Sop Tia | สบเตี๊ยะ | 21 | 12,407 |
| 6. | Ban Pae | บ้านแปะ | 20 | 12,042 |
| 7. | Doi Kaeo | ดอยแก้ว | 9 | 5,459 |
| 9. | Mae Soi | แม่สอย | 15 | 9,062 |

Missing numbers are tambons which now form Doi Lo District.

=== Local administration ===
There are six sub-district municipalities (thesaban tambon) in the district:

- Ban Luang (Thai: เทศบาลตำบลบ้านหลวง) consisting of parts of sub-district Ban Luang.
- Sop Tia (Thai: เทศบาลตำบลสบเตี๊ยะ) consisting of sub-district Sop Tia.
- Ban Pae (Thai: เทศบาลตำบลบ้านแปะ) consisting of sub-district Ban Pae.
- Doi Kaeo (Thai: เทศบาลตำบลดอยแก้ว) consisting of parts of sub-district Doi Kaeo.
- Mae Soi (Thai: เทศบาลตำบลแม่สอย) consisting of sub-district Mae Soi.
- Chom Thong (Thai: เทศบาลตำบลจอมทอง) consisting of parts of sub-districts Ban Luang, Khuang Pao, and Doi Kaeo.

There is one sub-district administrative organization (SAO) in the district:

- Khuang Pao (Thai: องค์การบริหารส่วนตำบลข่วงเปา) consisting of parts of sub-district Khuang Pao.
