= The Amazing Race Asia 3 =

Season of television series

- Season 3
- The Amazing Race Asia logo for season 3
- Presented by: Allan Wu
- No. of teams: 10
- Winners: Vince Chung & Sam Wu
- No. of legs: 11
- Distance traveled: 21,600 km (13,400 mi)
- No. of episodes: 11 (13 including racers revealed and recap)

Release
- Original network: AXN Asia
- Original release: September 11 – November 20, 2008

Additional information
- Filming dates: May 20 – June 8, 2008

Series chronology
- ← Previous; Season 2 Next → Season 4

The Amazing Race Asia 3 (also known as The Amazing Race Asia: Toughest Race Ever) is the third season of The Amazing Race Asia, an Asian reality competition show based on the American series The Amazing Race. It featured ten teams of two with a pre-existing relationship, in a race around Asia to win US$100,000. This season visited the entirety of Asia and six countries and travelled over 21,600 kilometres (13,400 mi) during eleven legs. Starting in Bangkok, teams travelled through Thailand, Vietnam, Taiwan, Hong Kong, Macau, India, and Oman, before finishing in Phuket. The season premiered on AXN Asia on September 11, 2008 and consisted of 11 episodes, two episodes fewer than the first and second seasons. The season finale aired on November 20, 2008.

Friends Vince Chung and Sam Wu, representing Hong Kong, were the winners of this season. Vince also became the first non-Asian by nationality to win The Amazing Race Asia, while Philippine dating couple Geoff Rodriguez and Tisha Silang finished in second place and Malaysian actress and heiress Ida Nerina and Tania Khan finished in third place.

== Production ==
=== Development and filming ===
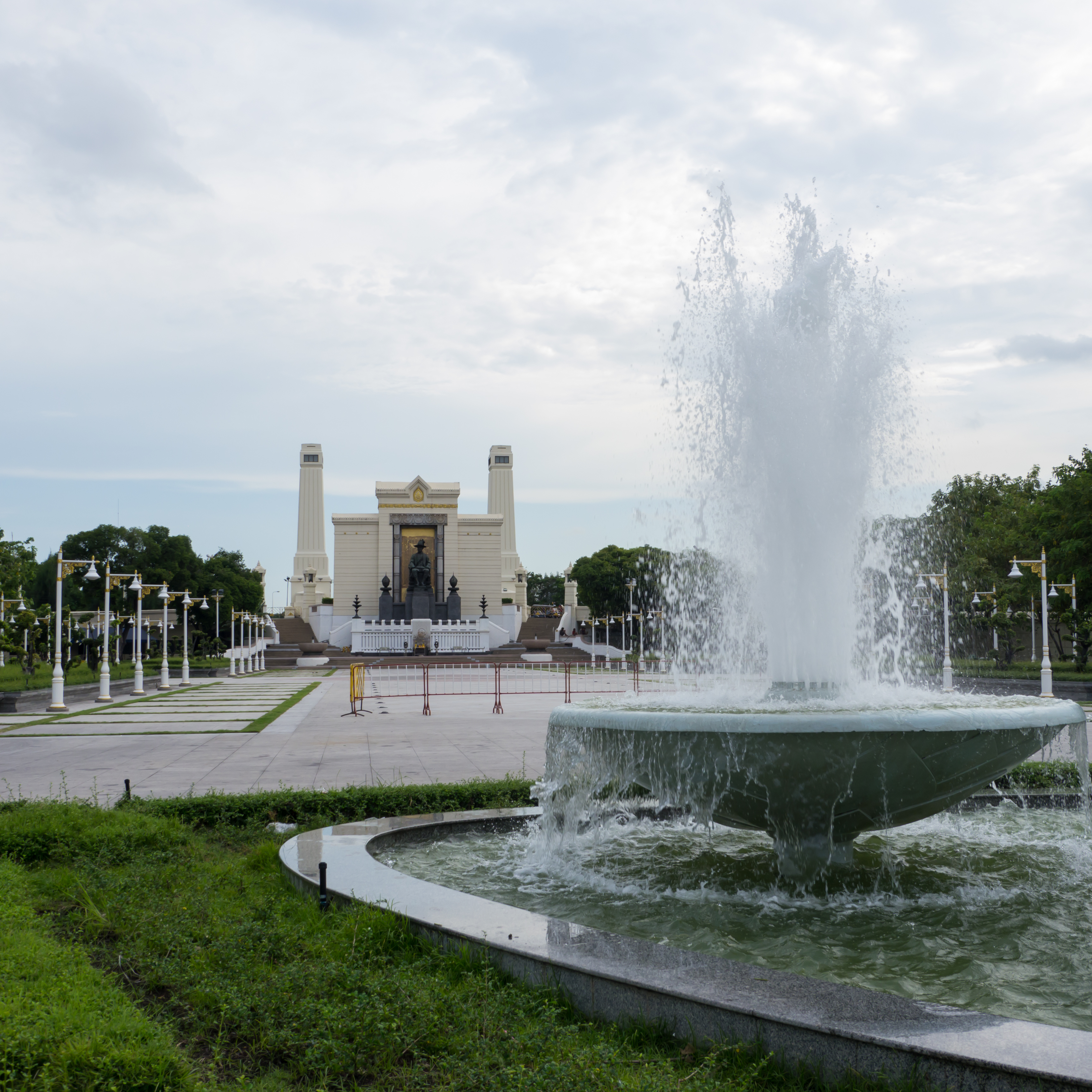
The park within the King Rama I Monument in downtown Bangkok served as the Starting Line for the third installment of The Amazing Race Asia.

The third season of The Amazing Race Asia covered 21,600 kilometres in six countries. Route markers were coloured yellow and white in Vietnam to avoid confusion with the former flag of South Vietnam. This season introduced the U-Turn marker, while the Intersection was not included. This season, like the American version's Family Edition and the Brazilian version, was the first time The Amazing Race Asia traveled across one continent, Asia (previous seasons covered at least two continents). Unlike past seasons, this was the first season to not have the first leg as a non-elimination leg. This season also had the number of episodes decreased from 13 to 11.

According to AXN, this season was dubbed as "the toughest Race ever" compared to previous seasons as both contestants and crew personnel experienced high fatigue during this season due to the faster pace and shorter break times. During filming, one production crew member was even hospitalized.

This was the only season of The Amazing Race Asia did not visit the country of Singapore.

Footage from the start of the season was shown on the ninth episode of The Amazing Race 16.

=== Casting ===
Applications for the third season were due on March 3, 2008 (extended from the original deadline on February 25, 2008). Interviews for semi-finalists and finalists were held sometime around March or April 2008. Filming was expected to have taken place around the middle of 2008.

Kynt Cothron and Vyxsin Fiala's audition video was shown on the "Racers Revealed" episode. Michael McKay, the executive producer of the show, confirmed that Kynt & Vyxsin of season 12 of the original American version of The Amazing Race did really submit an audition tape but did not make it because according to McKay "we felt it would be unfair to have a team that had already raced (and raced very well I might add) and also we take teams from Asia. But if we do an All Star version down the track you never know."

== Release ==
=== Marketing ===
The third season of The Amazing Race Asia had six official sponsors: Caltex, MASkargo, Nokia, Singha, Sony and Standard Chartered Bank.

=== Broadcasting ===
A special episode known as "Racers Revealed" aired one week before the actual premiere, on September 4, 2008, and a special "Memories" episode aired after the season finale on November 27, 2008, similar to the second season.

== Cast ==
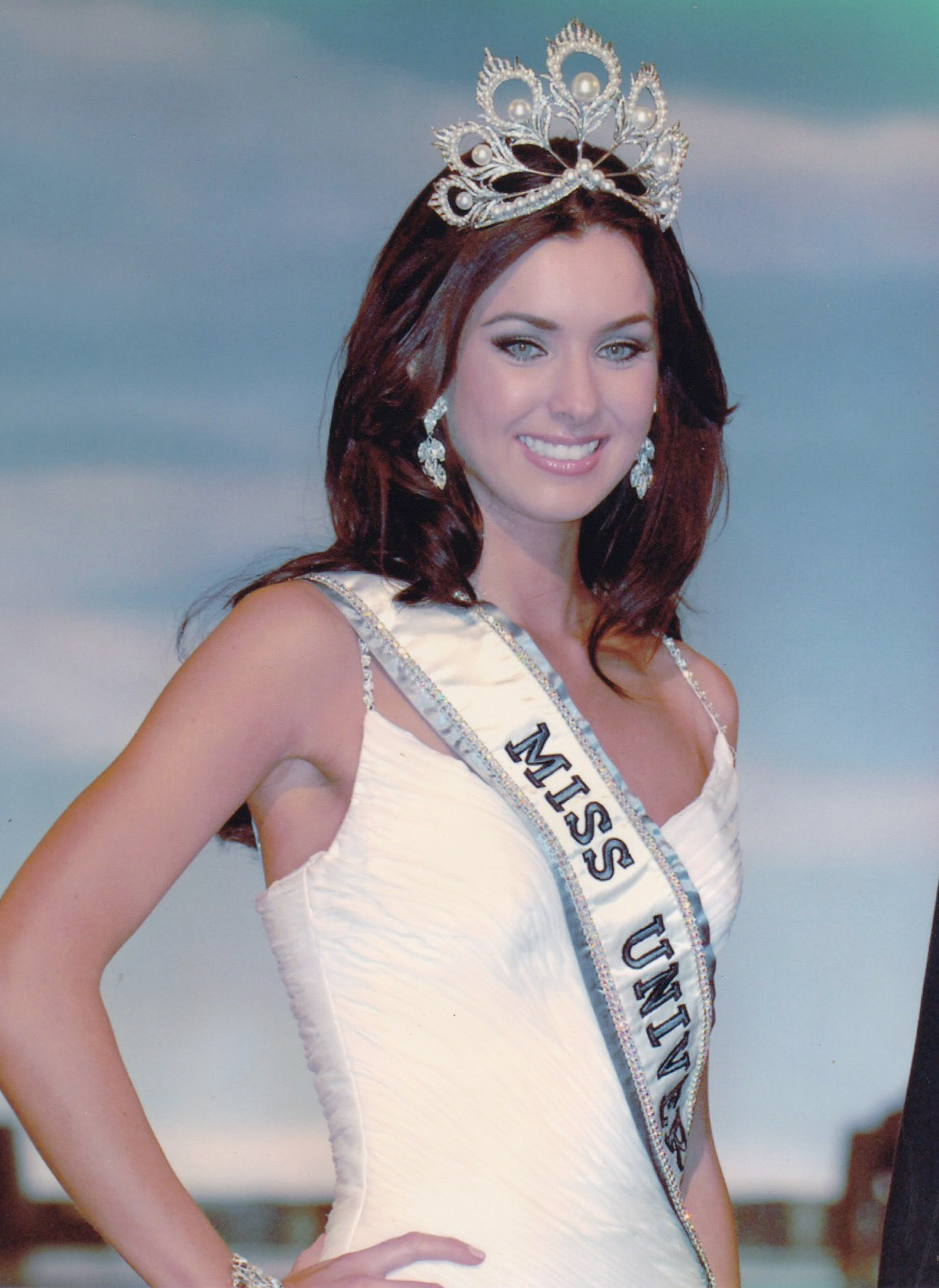
Natalie Glebova

This season's cast include cousins, and a father & son team. Like Season 2, this season featured a large number of local media personalities or their relatives. Natalie Glebova is the winner of Miss Universe 2005 and also the wife of Thai tennis player Paradorn Srichaphan. Her teammate, Pailin, is the runner-up in 2006 Miss Thailand Universe and also contested in Miss Earth 2006. Tisha Silang is the ex-girlfriend of Survivor Philippines's host, Paolo Bediones and was once Miss Philippines but had to forgo her crown due to her Canadian citizenship, while Ida, Niroo and Mai are famous actors in their respective homelands and Bernie is the host of Project Runway Malaysia. Isaac & William are sports commentators and football agents for professional players in the Korean K-League. Vince Matthew Chung is a leading stand-up comedian in Hong Kong, often performing and hosting at The TakeOut Comedy Club Hong Kong, and was a finalist in Hong Kong's first nationwide stand-up comedy competition.

This season consists of three non-Asians. Natalie and Vince are Canadians (though Natalie was born in Russia; Vince has a Chinese ethnicity), and Geoff is from New Zealand. Additionally, Sam, who was originally from Singapore, is representing Hong Kong. Tisha is of Canadian nationality but of Filipino ethnicity; Henry and Bernie are of Australian nationality but of Chinese ethnicity, however they are representing Malaysia.

Tania Khan died in late 2020 at the age of 48.

Contestants	Age	Relationship	Hometown	Status
Neena Rai	24	Cousins	Delhi, India	Eliminated 1st (in Mae Hia, Thailand)
Amit Rai	27	Cousins	Delhi, India	Eliminated 1st (in Mae Hia, Thailand)
Isaac Hong	29	Brothers	Seoul, South Korea	Eliminated 2nd (in Ho Chi Minh City, Vietnam)
William Hong	26	Brothers	Seoul, South Korea	Eliminated 2nd (in Ho Chi Minh City, Vietnam)
Pailin Rungratanasunthorn	25	Beauty Queens	Bangkok, Thailand	Eliminated 3rd (in Huế, Vietnam)
Natalie Glebova	26	Beauty Queens	Bangkok, Thailand	Eliminated 3rd (in Huế, Vietnam)
Niroo Asrani	53	Father & Son	Mumbai, India	Eliminated 4th (in Taipei, Taiwan)
Kapil Asrani	25	Father & Son	Mumbai, India	Eliminated 4th (in Taipei, Taiwan)
Visa "Mai" Sarasas	24	Friends	Bangkok, Thailand	Eliminated 5th (in Taipei, Taiwan)
Oliver Faivre	25	Friends	Bangkok, Thailand	Eliminated 5th (in Taipei, Taiwan)
Henry Chan	43	Brother & Sister	Kuala Lumpur, Malaysia	Eliminated 6th (in Kochi, India)
Bernie Chan	39	Brother & Sister	Kuala Lumpur, Malaysia	Eliminated 6th (in Kochi, India)
Adeline "A.D." Chan	34	Friends 15 Years	Singapore	Eliminated 7th (in Tanuf, Oman)
Faeza "Fuzzie" Sirajudin	34	Friends 15 Years	Singapore	Eliminated 7th (in Tanuf, Oman)
Ida Nerina	44	Actress & Heiress	Kuala Lumpur, Malaysia	Third Place
Tania Khan	36	Actress & Heiress	Kuala Lumpur, Malaysia	Third Place
Geoff Rodriguez	26	Dating	Batangas, Philippines	Second Place
Tisha Silang	32	Dating	Batangas, Philippines	Second Place
Vince Chung	32	Best Buddies	Hong Kong	Winners
Sam Wu	32	Best Buddies	Hong Kong	Winners

== Results ==
The following teams participated in the season, with their relationships at the time of filming. Placements are listed in finishing order:

- A red placement with a dagger (†) indicates that the team was eliminated.
- A blue placement with a double-dagger (‡) indicates that the team was the last to arrive at a Pit Stop in a non-elimination leg.
  - An underlined blue placement indicates that the team was marked for elimination; if the team did not place 1st in the next leg, they would receive a 30-minute penalty.
  - An italicised blue placement indicates that the team had to relinquish all of their money and were not allotted money for the next leg.
- A green ƒ indicates that the team won a Fast Forward.
- A brown > indicates that the team chose to use the Yield, and a brown < indicates the team who received it.
- A brown ⊃ means the team chose to use a U-Turn, and a ⊂ indicates the team who received it.

Team placement (by leg)
Team	1	2	3	4	5	6	7	8	9	10	11
Vince & Sam	7th (Note: Vince & Sam initially arrived 5th, but they did not pay the taxi driver. They were asked to pay the taxi first before they could be checked in. Ida & Tania and Isaac & William checked in while they went back, dropping them to 7th.)	3rd	2nd	2nd	1stƒ (Note: This team won the Fast Forward in this particular leg.)	1st	2nd	4th	1st	3rd (Note: Vince & Sam and A.D. & Fuzzie were issued 4-hour penalties after Sam and Fuzzie, respectively, had failed to complete the Roadblock. A.D. & Fuzzie were further issued another 30-minute penalty for being "marked for elimination" and not arriving 1st. At that time they were the only two teams left to check in at that point, and since A.D. & Fuzzie's penalty time was longer, Vince & Sam were allowed to check-in with their penalty time to be assessed at the start of the next leg, while A.D. & Fuzzie were eliminated without the 4-hour 30-minute penalty being issued.)	1st
Geoff & Tisha	2nd	5th	5th	6th	4th	3rd	1st> (Note: Geoff & Tisha used the Yield against Henry & Bernie)	1st	3rd⊃ (Note: Geoff & Tisha used the U-Turn against A.D. & Fuzzie)	2nd	2nd
Ida & Tania	5th	6th	3rd	1st	5th	5th‡	5th‡	3rd (Note: Ida & Tania initially arrived 2nd, but were issued a 30-minute penalty for being "marked for elimination" and not arriving 1st. A.D. & Fuzzie checked during their penalty time, dropping Ida & Tania to 3rd.)	2nd	1st	3rd
A.D. & Fuzzie	8th	2nd	4th	5th	3rd	4th	3rd	2nd	4th‡⊂	4th†	
Henry & Bernie	3rd	1st	1st	4th	2nd	2nd	4th<	5th†			
Mai & Oliver	1st	8th	6th	3rd	6th† (Note: Mai & Oliver failed to complete the leg after having fallen too far behind the other teams during the leg's first task. Hours after all the teams had checked in, Mai & Oliver still had not completed neither the Roadblock nor the Detour. Allan came over to the area where they had spent the night to inform of their elimination.)						
Niroo & Kapil	9th	4th	7th	7th† (Note: Pailin & Natalie (Leg 3) and Niroo & Kapil (Leg 4) were issued 4-hour penalties at their respective elimination legs after Natalie and Kapil had each failed to complete their respective Roadblocks; however, since both teams arrived last on each leg, each team was eliminated without being assessed the 4-hour penalty.)							
Pailin & Natalie	4th	7th	8th†								
Isaac & William	6th	9th†									
Neena & Amit	10th†										

== Race summary ==
Complete Route Map

Destinations	Air travel Rail travel Water travel Bus travel Helicopter travel Bicycle travel Gondola travel
Route Markers	Detour Roadblock Fast Forward Yield U-Turn Pit Stop

=== Leg 1 (Thailand) ===
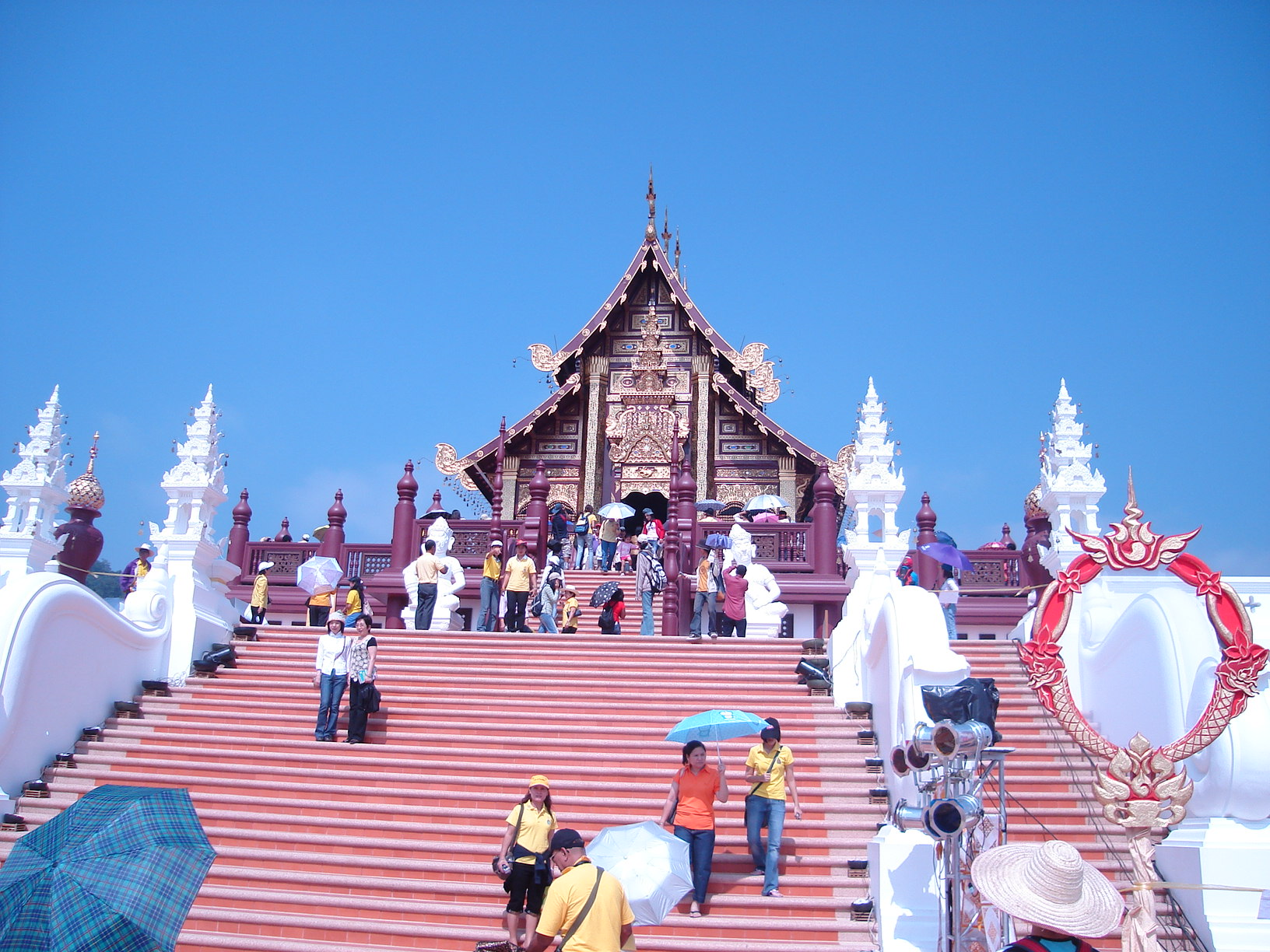
Teams ended the first leg in Chiang Mai Province at the Ho Kham Royal Pavilion, in the center of Royal Ratchaphruek Garden.

- Episode 1: “The Toughest Race Ever” (11 September 2008)
- Prize: US$2,500 for each team member, courtesy of Standard Chartered Bank (awarded to Mai & Oliver)
- Eliminated: Neena & Amit

Locations

- Bangkok, Thailand (King Rama I Monument) (Starting Line)
- Bangkok (Khaosan Road)
- Pathum Thani (Amphoe Khlong Luang – Caltex Service Station) → Suphan Buri (Wat Phai Rong Wua (in Thai))
- Suphan Buri (Wat Phai Rong Wua) → Chiang Mai (Chiang Mai Arcade Bus Station)
- Mae Raem (Chiang Mai X-Centre or Rice Field)
- Mae Hia (Ratchaphruek Garden – Ho Kham Royal Pavilion)

Episode summary

- Teams set off from King Rama I Monument in Bangkok and were instructed to travel to Khaosan Road. There, both team members had to consume one large bowl of Thai street food, consisting of assorted fried bugs, frogs and scorpions, to receive their next clue.
- The clue instructed teams to head to Caltex Service Station in Pathum Thani and completely clean a 22-seat passenger bus to the supervisor's satisfaction before receiving their next clue.
- The clue instructed teams had to sign-up for one of three newly washed buses to Suphan Buri, the first and second carried three teams while the last bus would carried four teams. After travelling to Wat Phai Rong Wua, teams had search the temple grounds for their next clue hidden amongst hundreds of Buddha statues. The first two buses, however, would depart 20 minutes after they arrived at the temple. After finding a clue, teams had to board the next available bus to go to Chiang Mai. Upon arrival at the Arcade Bus Station, teams found their next clue.
- This season's first Detour was a choice between Race or Rice. In Race, teams had to proceed to the Chiang Mai X-Centre and drive an off-road buggy over an eight-kilometre (5.0 mi) track to receive their next clue. In Rice, teams had to work together to pound rice into paste and make two rice balls before receiving their next clue.
- After the Detour, teams had to check in at the Pit Stop: Ratchaphruek Garden.

Additional note

- Paula Taylor from the previous season was the greeter on this leg.

=== Leg 2 (Thailand → Vietnam) ===
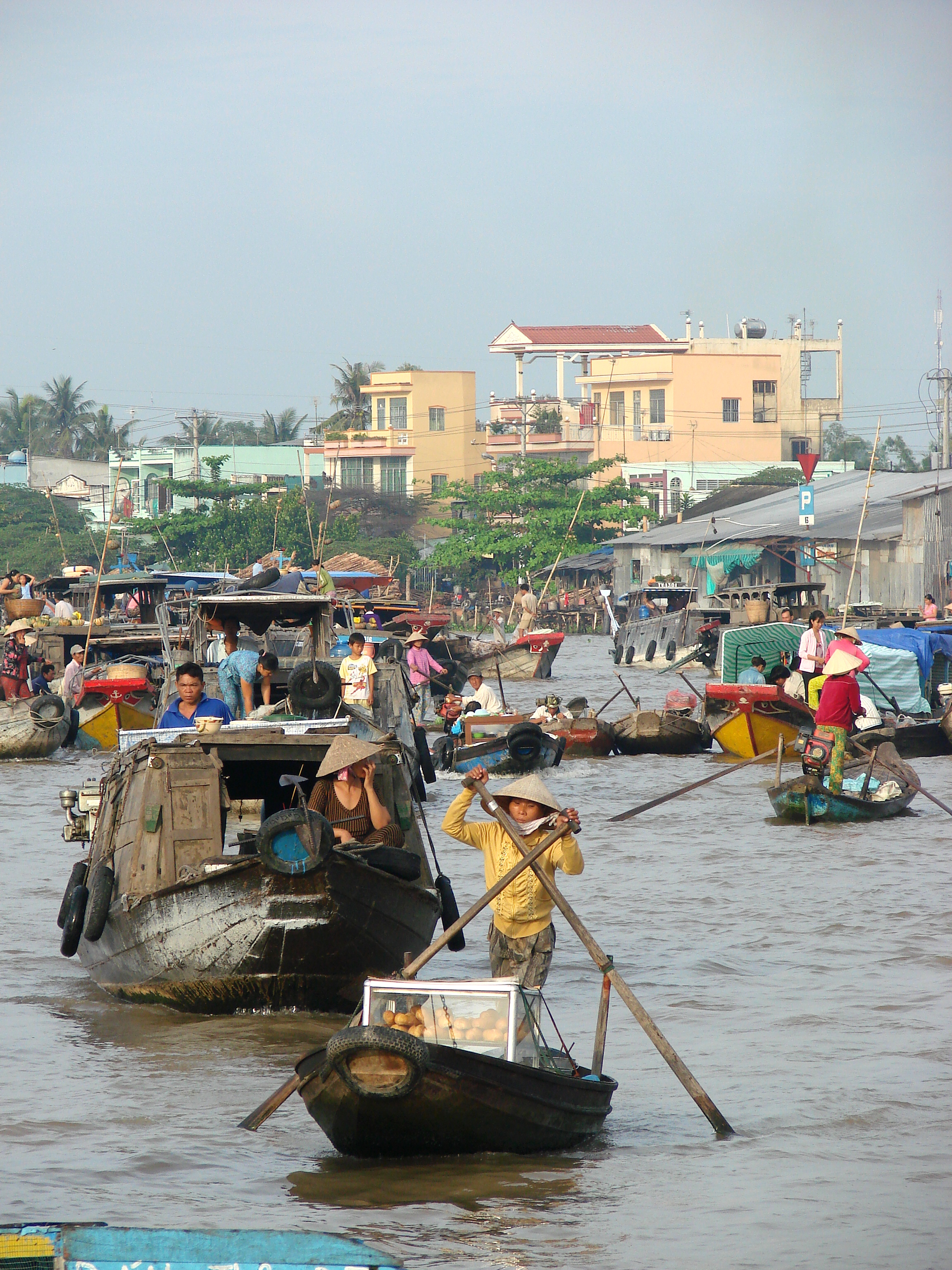
One of the Detour choices in Cái Bè required teams to row a sampan through the town's famous floating market.

- Episode 2: “I Wanna Be a Man” (18 September 2008)
- Prize: Free Caltex fuel with techron for a year (awarded to Henry & Bernie)
- Eliminated: Isaac & William

Locations

- Chiang Mai (Ratchaphruek Garden – Ho Kham Royal Pavilion)
- Mae Kham Pong (Flight of the Gibbon) (Overnight Rest)
- Chiang Mai (Sathit Buarawong Banana Plantation)
- Chiang Mai (Chiang Mai International Airport) → Ho Chi Minh City, Vietnam (Tan Son Nhat International Airport)
- Ho Chi Minh City (Saigon Opera House)
- Ho Chi Minh City (Saigon Phố Cafe)
- Ho Chi Minh City (Bến Thành Market)
- Ho Chi Minh City (Ben Thanh Bus Station) → Cái Bè (Cái Bè Bus Station)
- Cái Bè (Cao Dai Temple)
- Cái Bè (Chánh Trần Fruit Depot and Cái Bè Floating Market or Bằng Chicken Farm and Cái Bè Land Market)
- Cái Bè (Cái Bè Bus Station) → Ho Chi Minh City (Thánh Nữ Jeanne D'Arc Church (in Vietnamese))
- Ho Chi Minh City (Saigon Central Post Office)
- Ho Chi Minh City (Museum of Vietnamese History)

Episode summary

- At the start of the leg, teams had to travel to Flight of the Gibbon where they had to go through a jungle heights course consisting of zip-lines and a parallel drop before getting their next clue, instructing them to Sathit Buarawong Banana Plantation to search for their next clue.
- In this season's first Roadblock, one team member had to cross a plantation and retrieve their next clue from a hanging backpack without being hit by snipers brandishing paintball guns, who would fire paintballs at the team member. If the team member was shot, they had to return to the starting point and perform the task again.
- After the Roadblock, teams were instructed to fly to Ho Chi Minh City, Vietnam. Once there, teams made their way to Saigon Opera House to grab their next clue, directing them to Saigon Phố Cafe, where each team member had to play a Nokia N-Gage game, known as System Rush: Evolution, on a Nokia N82 handphone and complete three laps around a track within a time limit to receive their next clue, that would lead to direct them Bến Thành Market, where they find a specific flower stall to the lady that would hand them their next clue, instructed them to travel by bus to Cái Bè. Once there, they made their way to Cao Dai Temple to get their next clue.
- This leg's Detour was a choice between Sampan and Some Walk. In Sampan, teams would have had to load a sampan with fruit and then row it across the river to a trader, who would give teams their next clue. In Some Walk, teams had to gather twenty live chickens and then deliver then using a đòn gánh to a vendor in the land market to receive their next clue. Some teams attempted Sampan, before switched and completed Some Walk.
- After the Detour, teams made their way back to Ho Chi Minh City and travelled to Thánh Nữ Jeanne D'Arc Church, teams had to choose a Red Cross aid expert, each representing one of the nine available charity organisations, and use US$500 from Singha to purchase supplies as needed by the organisation. Once complete, team would find their next clue outside the Saigon Central Post Office, instructed them to the Pit Stop: Museum of Vietnamese History.

Additional note

- All route markers in Vietnam were colored yellow and white rather than red and yellow, so as to avoid confusion with the flag of the former independent state of South Vietnam.

=== Leg 3 (Vietnam) ===
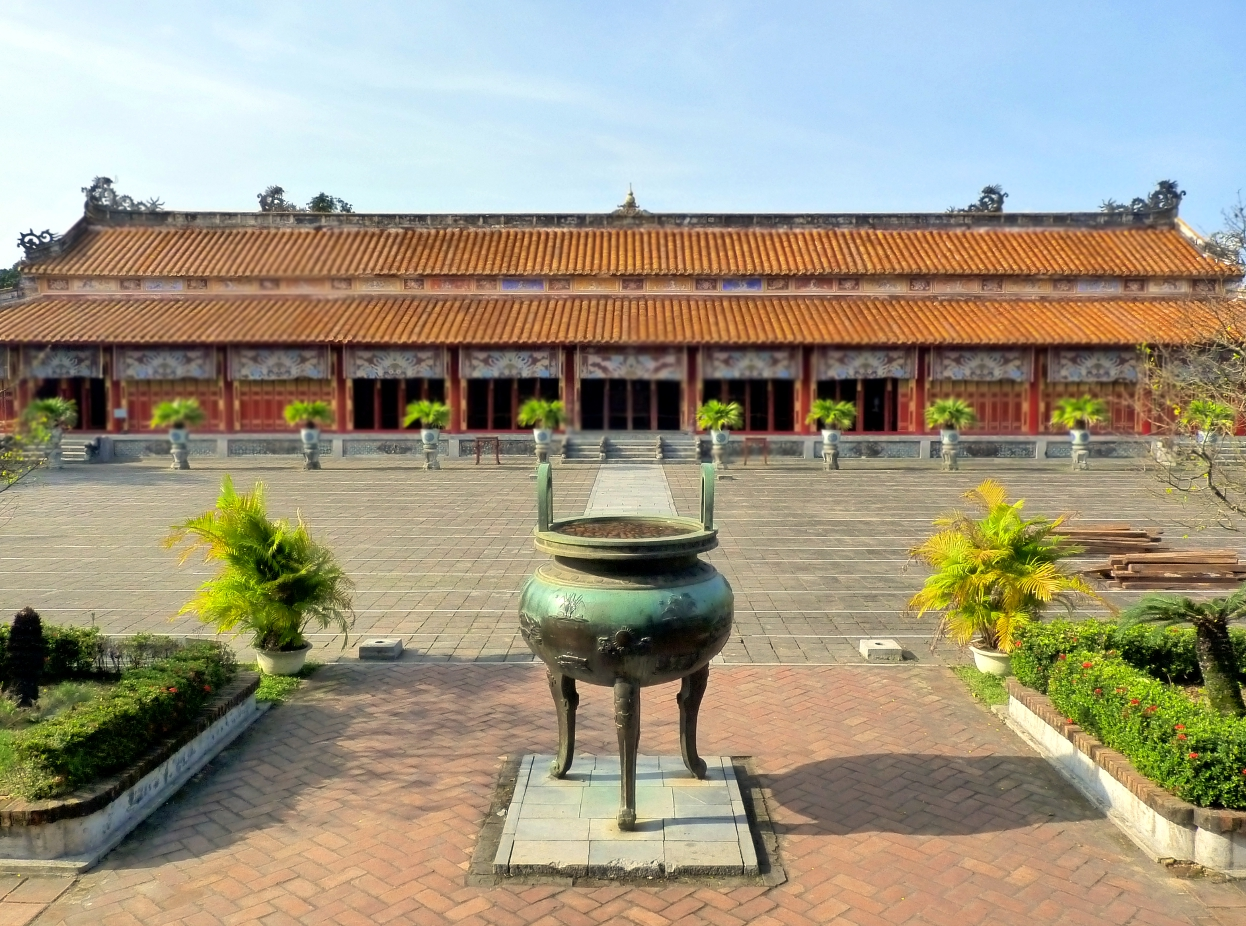
Teams finished this leg in Huế, Vietnam's ancient capital, at Thế Miếu Temple inside its old citadel.

- Episode 3: “You Are Running Away, Nobody's Helping Me” (25 September 2008)
- Prize: A Sony Handycam for each team member (awarded to Henry & Bernie)
- Eliminated: Pailin & Natalie

Locations

- Ho Chi Minh City (Saigon Zoo and Botanical Gardens)
- Ho Chi Minh City (Mien Dong Coach Station) → Huế (Bến Xe Phía Bắc)
- Huế (Trần Thanh Mại – Caltex Service Facility)
- Hương Thủy (Khải Định Tomb)
- Hương Trà (Minh Mạng Tomb) and Hương Thủy (Khải Định Tomb)
- Hương Thủy (Dạ Lê Thượng Shrine or Rice Paddy Field)
- Huế (Quốc Học Park → Huế Citadel – Thế Miếu Temple)

Episode summary

- At the start of the leg, teams were instructed to travel by bus to Huế. Once there, they had to travel to the Caltex Service Facility in Trần Thanh Mại, where they had to change the rear tires and engine oil of a marked jeep, their transportation for the rest of the leg, to receive their next clue, directing them to Khải Định Tomb and search for their next clue.
- In this leg's Roadblock, one team member had to retrieve seven coins representing the seven emperors of the Nguyễn dynasty at Minh Mạng Tomb then bring them back to Khải Định Tomb, where they would find out that they had to place the coins in the correct order of the reign of the emperors to receive their next clue. Each table that had a coin at Minh Mạng Tomb also contained information about the reigns of the corresponding emperor, and racers could return to the tomb to obtain this information.
- This leg's Detour was a choice between Sticks and Stalks. In Sticks, teams had watch a silent demonstration and then make ten incense sticks to receive their next clue. In Stalks, teams had to thresh rice stalks into a farming machine and fill two baskets to receive their next clue from a farmer.
- After the Detour, teams instructed to travel to Quốc Học Park, where they had to search for a marked cyclo with their next clue and use it to travel to the location of the next Pit Stop: Huế Citadel.

Additional note

- Natalie was unable to compete the Roadblock and elected to take the 4-hour penalty.

=== Leg 4 (Vietnam → Taiwan) ===
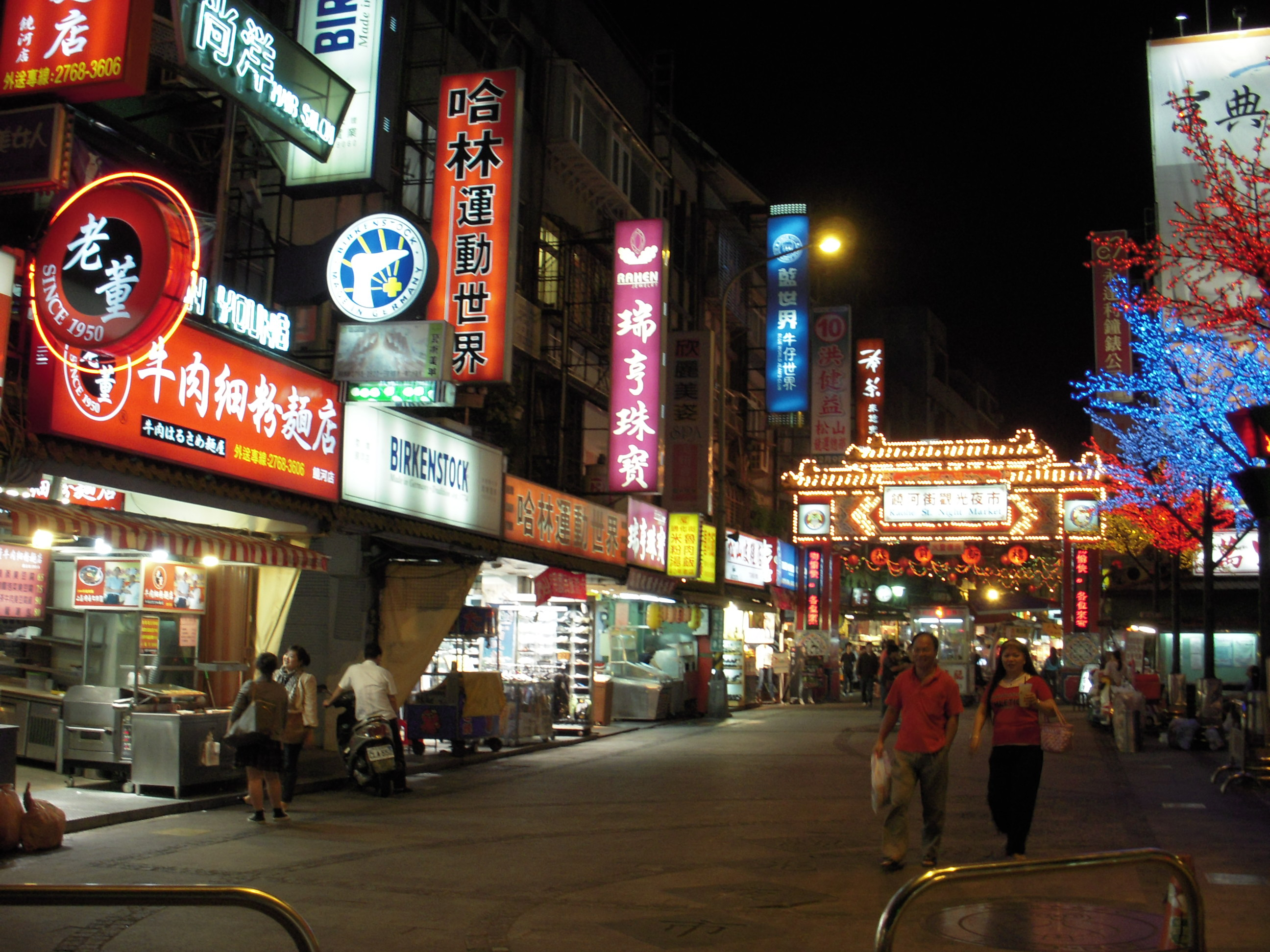
In Taipei, one Detour option was set at the famous Taiwanese night market in Songshan.

- Episode 4: “Where’s Our Car?” (2 October 2008)
- Prize: A Nokia N96 handphone for each team member (awarded to Ida & Tania)
- Eliminated: Niroo & Kapil

Locations

- Huế (Huế Citadel – Thế Miếu Temple)
- Huế (Phu Bai International Airport) → Taipei, Taiwan (Taiwan Taoyuan International Airport)
- Taipei (Ximending – Red Playhouse)
- Taipei (Miniatures Museum of Taiwan or Raohe Street Night Market)
- Xinzhuang (Institute for the Blind of Taiwan)
- Shenkeng (Old Street)
- Taipei (City Hall Square)

Episode summary

- At the start of the leg, teams were instructed to fly to Taipei, Taiwan. Once there, they had to drive themselves to Red Playhouse for their next clue.
- This leg's Detour was a choice between Shoot It or Shape It. In Shoot It, teams had to drive themselves to the Miniatures Museum of Taiwan and pick a Sony Cyber-shot camera to photograph a miniature model of an Amazing Race envelope hidden inside one of the dioramas. After the photo was printed, teams' next clue could be found behind their new photo. In Shape It, teams had to drive themselves to Raohe Street Night Market, where they had to recreate four shapes using a large tangram set to receive their next clue.
- After the Detour, teams had to drive themselves to Institute for the Blind of Taiwan, where one team member would be blindfolded and then, using their hands only to feel a braille message, describe each letter to their partner, who could not see their teammate's board, to decipher the correct phrase "Go to Shenkeng" and receive their next clue. One team would find a check worth NT$612,000 (US$20,000) courtesy of Standard Chartered inside their next clue and would donate it to the institute before proceeding.
- In this leg's Roadblock, one team member had to eat an entire bowl of stinky tofu, a delicacy common in Taiwanese cuisine, to receive their next clue from a waiter, directing them to drive to the Pit Stop: Taipei City Hall.

Additional note

- Kapil was unable to compete the Roadblock and elected to take the 4-hour penalty.

=== Leg 5 (Taiwan) ===
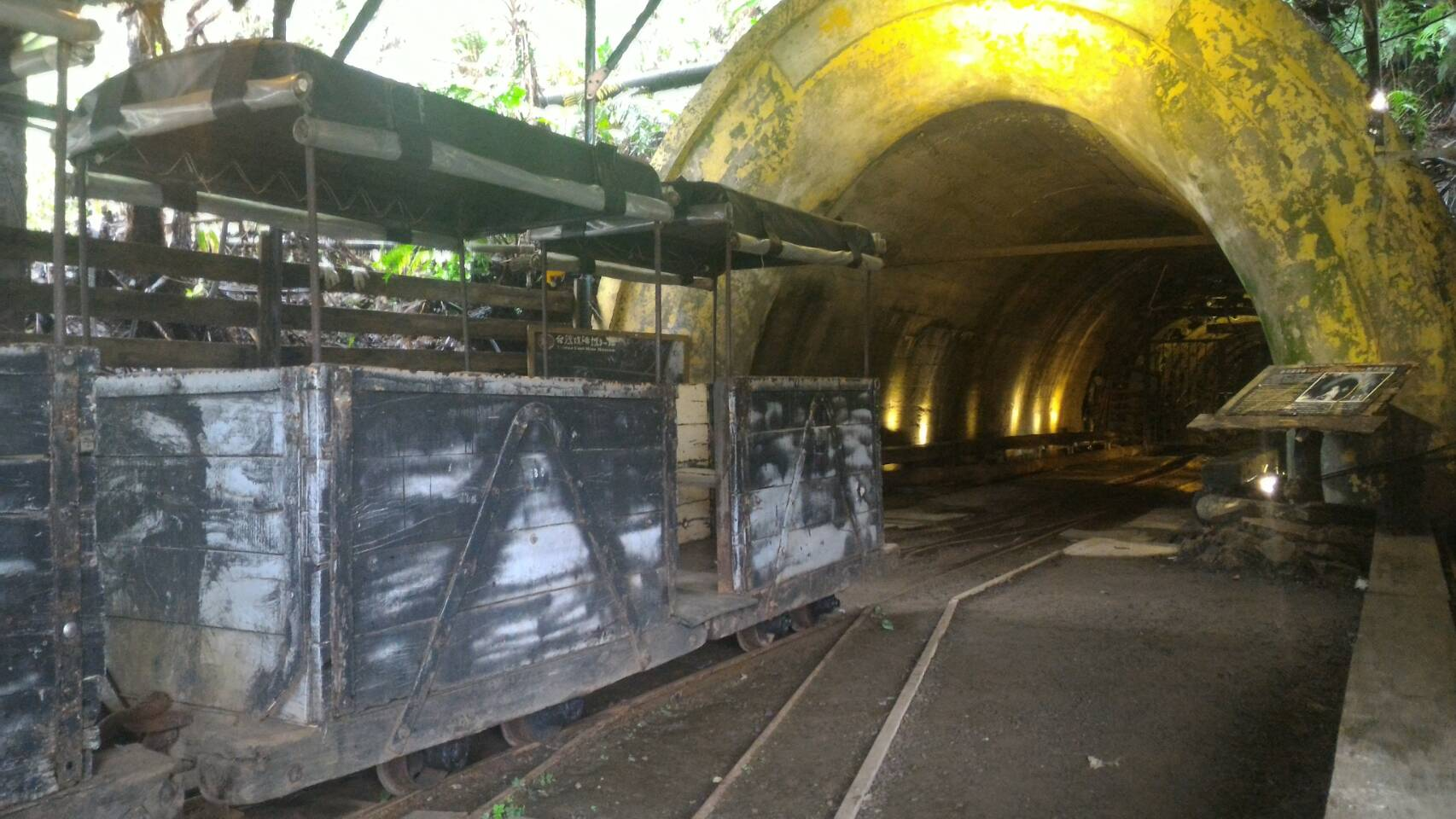
The Roadblock in Pinghsi had racers involved in its famous coal mining history.

- Episode 5: “You See How They're Not Fighting All the Time” (9 October 2008)
- Prize: A three-day, two-night holiday in Ko Samui, Thailand, courtesy of Singha Beer (awarded to Vince & Sam)
- Eliminated: Mai & Oliver

Locations

- Taipei (City Hall Square)
- Taipei (New Sogo Department Store – Sony Style Store)
  - Taipei (Ximending – Intersection of Xining South Road & Wuchang Street and Kevin's Tattoo)
- Shifen (New Pinghsi Coal Mine)
- Taipei (Ximending – Wan Nian Building (in Chinese)) or Zhonghe (Yuantong Temple)
- Taipei (Taipei Astronomical Museum)

Episode summary

- At the start of the leg, teams had to drive to Sony Style Store, where they had to find a Blu-ray disc out of a thousand in the racks and placed it on a Blu-ray player upon showing their message on BRAVIA high definition television, "Correct! You may receive your next clue", while the others would display "Sorry. Try again". If they found it right, they would have their next clue.
- In this season's only Fast Forward, one team had to drive to an intersection of Xining South Road & Wuchang Street, where there would find a clue box, that would instruct each team member to get a permanent tattoo at Kevin's Tattoo to win the Fast Forward award. Vince & Sam won the Fast Forward.
- Teams who did not attempt the Fast Forward had to drive themselves to New Pinghsi Coal Mine for their next clue.
- In this leg’s Roadblock, one team member had to find a souvenir, a small silver token that had the AXN logo on one side and The Amazing Race Asia logo on the other side, hidden in a mine cart full of coal and exchange it for their next clue.
- This leg's Detour was a choice between Pick or Pail. In Pick, teams had to drive themselves to Wan Nian Building and retrieve three stuffed toys from inside from a claw machine to receive their next clue. In Pail, teams had to go to the Yuantong Temple, fill a bucket full of water, and carry it to the top of the mountain, where a monk would check to see if they had enough water. If they had enough, teams would receive their next clue.
- After the Detour, teams had to drive themselves to the Pit Stop: the Taipei Astronomical Museum.

Additional note

- Mai & Oliver had fallen so far behind the other teams after failed to complete the first task due to closing time. While on their route to New Pinghsi Coal Mine, neither they performed the Roadblock nor the Detour. Allan came over to the area where they had spent the night to inform of their elimination.

=== Leg 6 (Taiwan → Hong Kong) ===
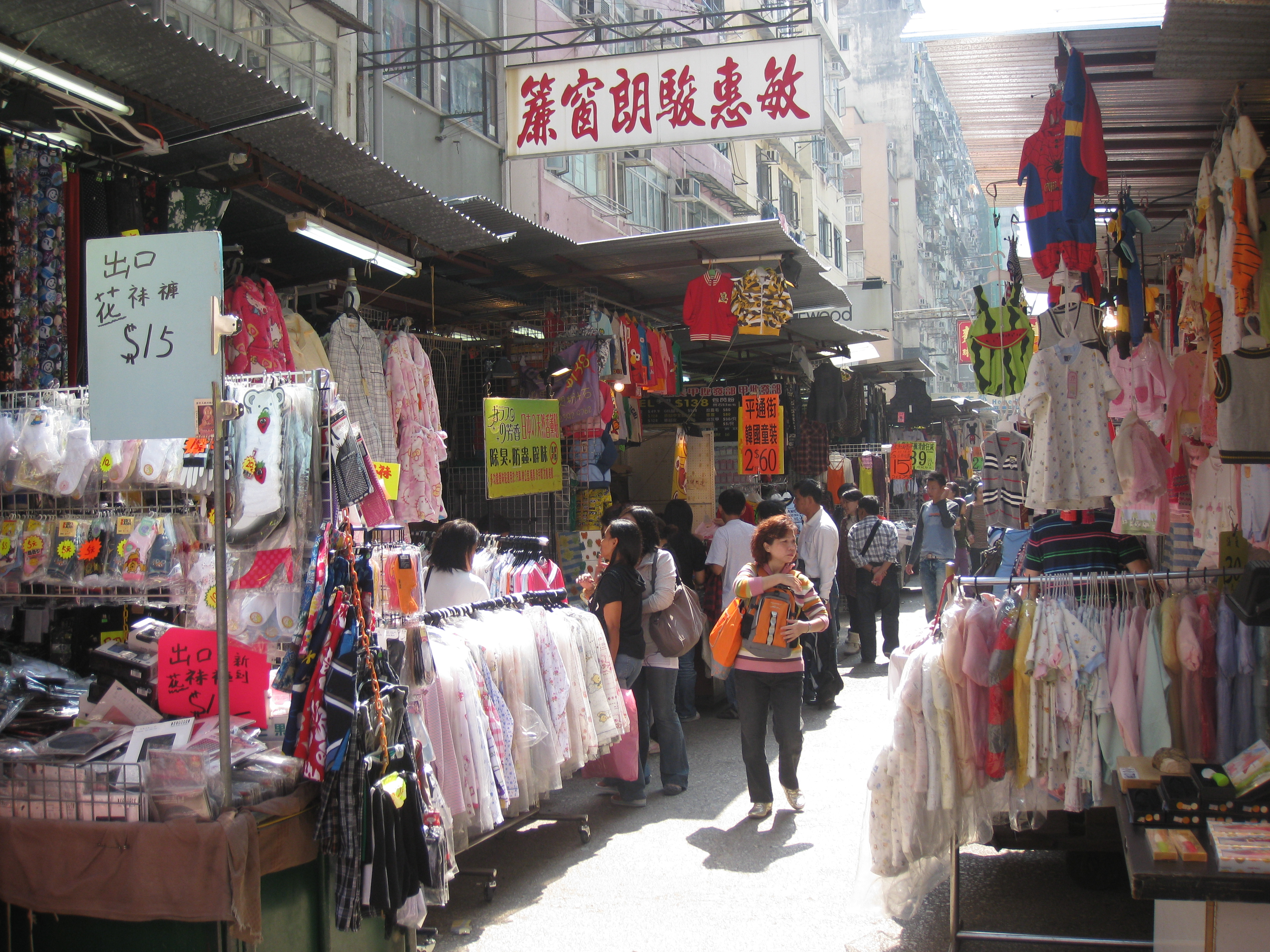
The Roadblock in Hong Kong required racers to search through the busy Ladies' Market for a woman wearing a matching handbag.

- Episode 6: “I Think I’m Cuter” (16 October 2008)
- Prize: A three-day, two-night holiday in Ko Samui, Thailand, courtesy of Singha Beer (awarded to Vince & Sam)

Locations

- Taipei (Taipei Astronomical Museum)
- Taipei (Taiwan Taoyuan International Airport) → Hong Kong (Hong Kong International Airport)
- Hong Kong (Ho Man Tin – King's Park Sports Ground)
- Hong Kong (Intersection of Hollywood Road & Peel Street)
- Hong Kong (Graham Street or Mee Lun Street)
- Hong Kong (Central Piers → Tsim Sha Tsui Ferry Terminal)
- Hong Kong (Ladies' Market)
- Hong Kong (Blake Pier)

Episode summary

- At the start of the leg, teams were instructed to fly to Hong Kong. Once there, they made their way to King’s Park Sports Ground where they had to get through the rugby field to the clue box at the opposite end of the field while the Standard Chartered national rugby union players attempted to block their path, directing them to the intersection of Hollywood Road & Peel Street to find their next clue.
- This leg's Detour was a choice between Get Fishy or Get Lucky. In Get Fishy, teams had to find a seafood store on Graham Street and clean, gut and scale 15 fish to the satisfaction of a fishmonger to receive their next clue. In Get Lucky, teams had to find a marked table on Mee Lun Street and bite open 300 fortune cookies in a jar until they found the one cookie containing a fortune that stated they could get their next clue.
- After the Detour, teams must head to Central Piers and took a Star Ferry to Tsim Sha Tsui Ferry Terminal where they then took a taxi to Ladies' Market in Mong Kok to find their next clue.
- In this leg's Roadblock, one team member had to choose one of the provided handbags and search through the crowded market for the woman carrying the same handbag, who would give them their next clue.
- After the Roadblock, teams had to check in at the Pit Stop: Blake Pier in Stanley.

Additional note

- This was a non-elimination leg.

=== Leg 7 (Hong Kong → Macau) ===
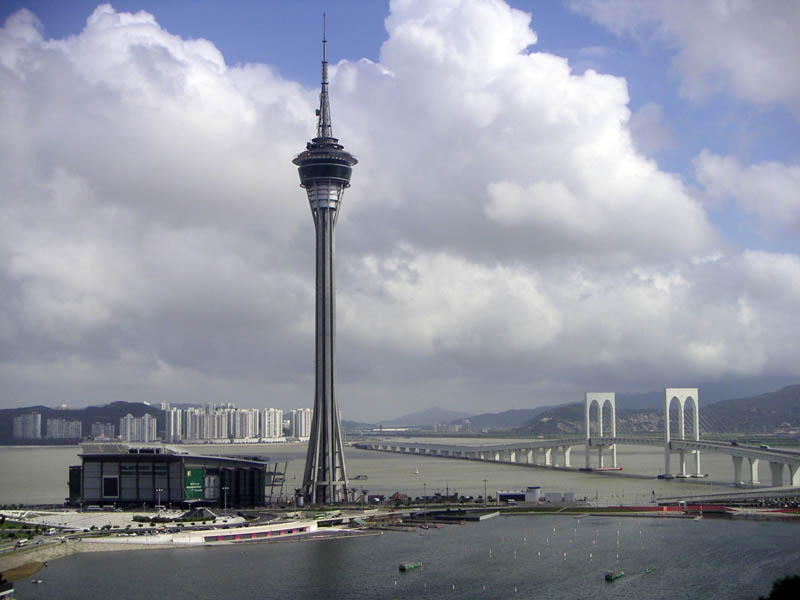
The Macau Tower in Macau was the location for the Roadblocks of Legs 7 and 8.

- Episode 7: “What the Fish?” (23 October 2008)
- Prize: A Sony BRAVIA and Sony PlayStation 3 for each team member (awarded to Geoff & Tisha)

Locations

- Hong Kong (Blake Pier)
- Hong Kong (Mong Kok – Boundary Street)
- Hong Kong (Bonham Strand)
- Hong Kong (Hong Kong–Macau Ferry Terminal) → Macau (Outer Harbour Ferry Terminal)
- Macau (Senado Square)
- Macau (Macau Tower)
- Macau (Sai Van Lake – Dragon Boat Pier)
- Macau (Maritime Museum or Hotel Royal Macau)
- Macau (A-Ma Cultural Village)

Episode summary

- At the start of the leg, teams had to travel to the Goldfish Market at Boundary Street in Mong Kok where they had to pick up four goldfish and bring them to a designated pet shop at Bonham Strand to exchange for their next clue, instructed them to travel by ferry to Macau. Once there, teams had to travel by pedicab to the fountain at Senado Square to find their next clue.
- In this leg's Roadblock, one team member had to climb to the top of the mast of the Macau Tower to obtain their next clue and go down back to their partner before reading their next clue. However, due to lightning, not all of the racers who chose to perform the Roadblock were allowed to climb the exterior spire as a precaution and were given their clue.
- After the Roadblock, teams made their way to travel to Sai Van Lake, where they had to paddle a dragon boat around a floating Caltex buoy and return to the pier to get their next clue.
- This leg's Detour was a choice between Dance or Chance. In Dance, teams had to correctly perform a lion dance routine to the satisfaction of the dance troupe to receive their next clue. In Chance, teams had to don formal attire and play a game of blackjack in the casino of Hotel Royal Macau. Teams had to beat the dealer nine times (as denoted each letter given after a win that would form the word COMPLETED) until they would receive their next clue.
- After the Detour, teams had to travel to A-Ma Cultural Village, where they must arrange lanterns bearing the animals of the Chinese zodiac into the correct order before being allowed to enter into the Pit Stop.

Additional notes

- Geoff & Tisha chose to Yield Henry & Bernie.
- This was a non-elimination leg.

=== Leg 8 (Macau → Hong Kong → India) ===
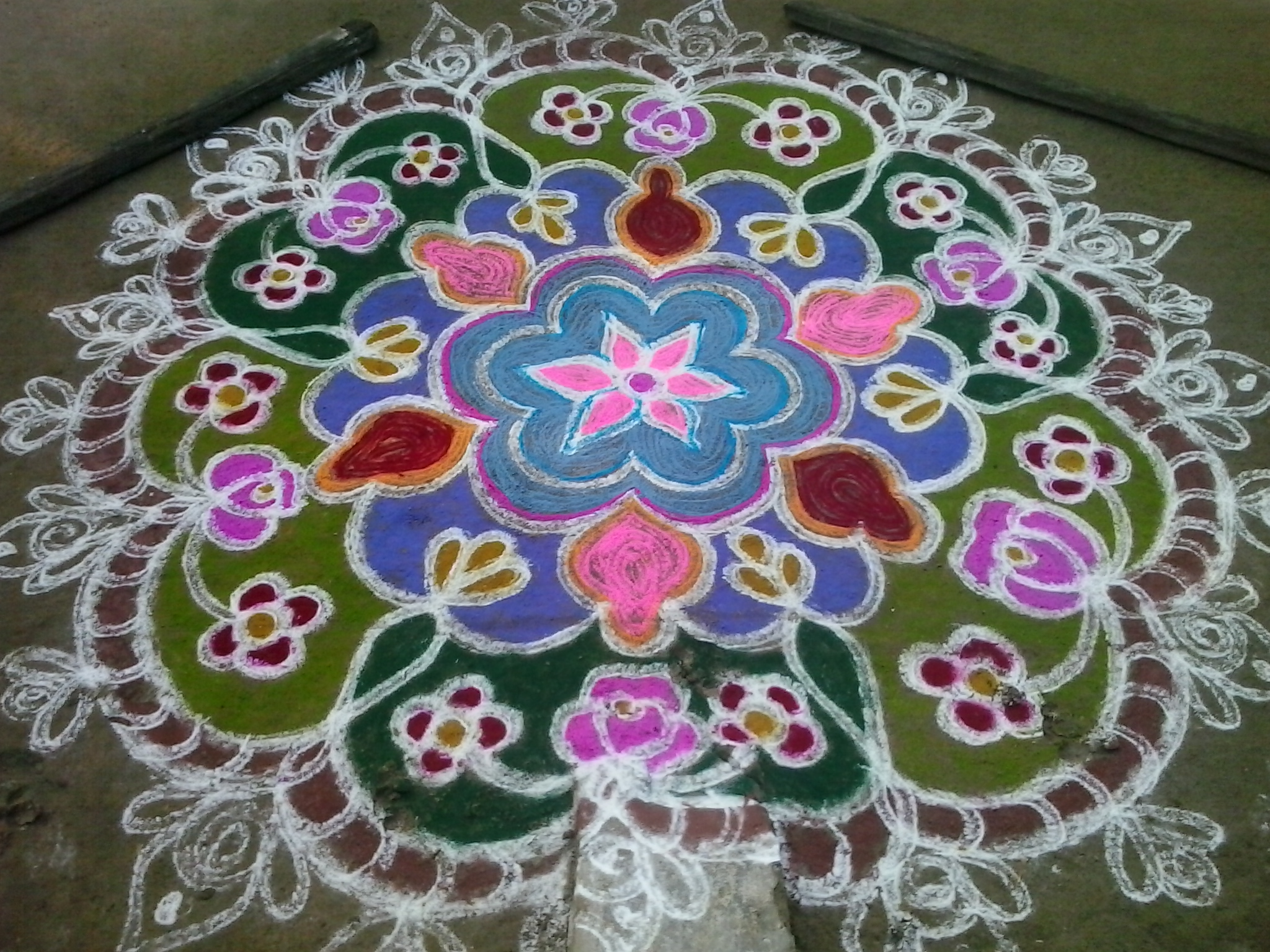
One side of the Detour in Kochi required teams to make an intricate colored rice pattern used for Hindu festivals, locally known as Rangoli.

- Episode 8: “The Gloves Are Coming Off, the War Paint Is Coming On” (30 October 2008)
- Prize: A holiday in Hong Kong, courtesy of Caltex (awarded to Geoff & Tisha)
- Eliminated: Henry & Bernie

Locations

- Macau (A-Ma Cultural Village)
- Macau (Ruins of Saint Paul's)
- Macau (Macau Tower)
- Macau (Outer Harbour Ferry Terminal) → Hong Kong (Hong Kong–Macau Ferry Terminal)
  - Macau (Macau Heliport) → Hong Kong (Shun Tak Heliport)
- Hong Kong (Hong Kong International Airport – MASkargo Warehouse)
- Hong Kong (Hong Kong International Airport) → Kochi, India (Cochin International Airport)
- Kochi (Neelam Kulangara Devi Temple)
- Kochi (Kumbalam – Elephant Wash Grounds near SPS Temple)
- Kochi (Fort Kochi – Chinese Fishing Nets and Marina the Sea Face Restaurant or Mattancherry Palace)
- Kochi (Bolgatty Palace)

Episode summary

- At the start of the leg, teams had to travel to the famous Ruins of Saint Paul's for their next clue, instructed them to Macau Tower where they would get their next clue.
- In this leg's Roadblock, one team member had to perform the world's highest bungee jump from the top of the Macau Tower and fall 233 metres (764 ft) to the ground to receive their next clue.
- After the Roadblock, teams were instructed to take a ferry to Hong Kong, once there, they had to travel to the MASkargo warehouse, where they had to search for a box addressed to them containing letters from their loved ones before receiving their next clue, instructing them to fly to Kochi, India. Once there, teams had to travel to Neelam Kulangara Devi Temple where they had to get a good luck blessing from the Hindu priest before receiving their next clue, directed them to the Elephant Wash Grounds near SPS Temple, where they had to wash an elephant using traditional methods by having coconut husks as abrasives to receive their next clue.
- This leg's Detour was a choice between Fish or Fill. In Fish, team members had to carry six 20-kilogram (44 lb) marlins to a nearby restaurant to receive their next clue. In Fill, teams had to recreate an intricate floor pattern using coloured rice, known as Rangoli, to receive their next clue.
- After the Detour, teams had to travel to the Pit Stop: Bolgatty Palace.

Additional note

- For completing the Roadblock first, Geoff & Tisha travelled by helicopter to Hong Kong.

=== Leg 9 (India) ===
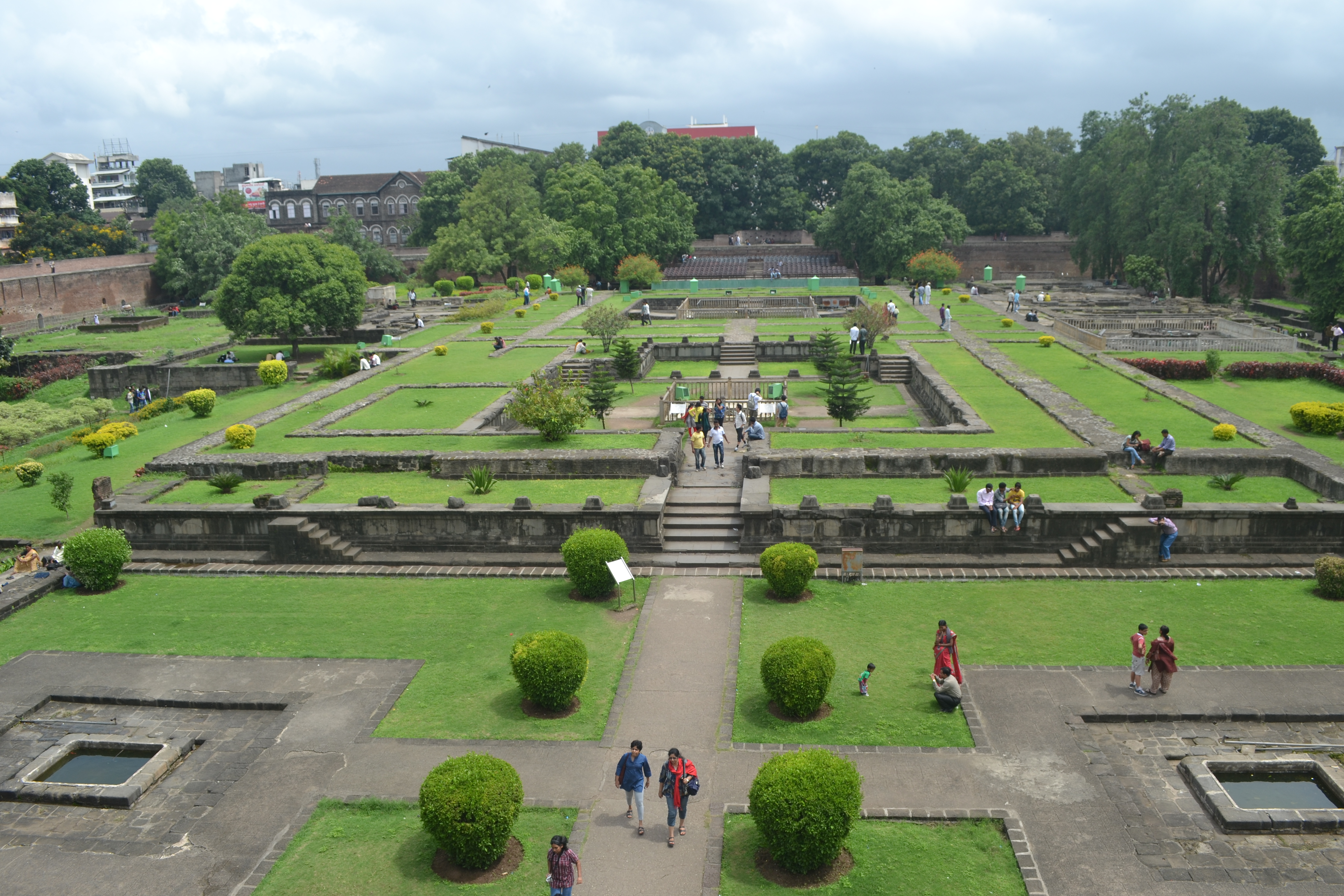
The Roadblock in Pune had teams scoured the gardens of Shaniwar Wada for mens wearing correct pheta.

- Episode 9: “Are People Here Funny?” (6 November 2008)
- Prize: A Nokia N96 handphone for each team member (awarded to Vince & Sam)

Locations

- Kochi (Bolgatty Palace)
- Kochi (Cochin International Airport) → Mumbai (Chhatrapati Shivaji Maharaj International Airport)
- Pune (Jawaharlal Nehru Stadium)
- Pune (Shaniwar Wada)
- Pune (Aundh – Equity Tower (Sony World Showroom))
- Pune (Shukrawar Peth – (Datta Shinde Pottery Shop and Mahatma Phule Market – Rajkumar Provision Stores or Agarwal Sweets))
- Pune (Shukrawar Peth – Desai Bandhu Ambewale)
- Pune (Gokhale Institute)

Episode summary

- At the start of the leg, teams were instructed to fly to Mumbai, and then travel to Jawaharlal Nehru Stadium in Pune where one team member had to hit a cricket ball onto an Amazing Race-coloured boundary to receive their next clue. If teams did not manage to do so after 36 bowls, they would incur a ten-minute penalty before receiving their next clue, they instructed to use a map application on the Nokia 6210 Navigator to direct their auto rickshaw driver to their next destination, the Shaniwar Wada.
- In this leg's Roadblock, one team member had to find a pheta with the word "Correct" inside it amongst ones worn by 50 men walking around the fort's gardens to receive their next clue.
- After the Roadblock, teams had to travel to the Sony World Showroom in Aundh, where they had to persuade the locals to tell them a joke while one team member recorded them on a Sony Handycam, then teams have to come back and replay the video to the staff. If the staff thought the joke was funny enough, they would give teams their next clue.
- This leg's Detour was a choice between Push and Crush. In Push, teams had to go to Datta Shinde Pottery Shop, where they had to load a cart with 75 pots and push it one kilometre to Rajkumar Provision Stores in Mahatma Phule Market with at least 70 intact pots remaining to receive next clue. In Crush, teams had to go to Agarwal Sweets, where they had to crush sugarcane sticks to make 40 glasses of sugarcane juice and sell them to earn at least ₹200 to receive their next clue.
- After the Detour, teams had to travel to the Pit Stop: the Gokhale Institute.

Additional notes

- Geoff & Tisha chose to use the U-Turn on A.D. & Fuzzie.
- This was a non-elimination leg.

=== Leg 10 (India → Oman) ===
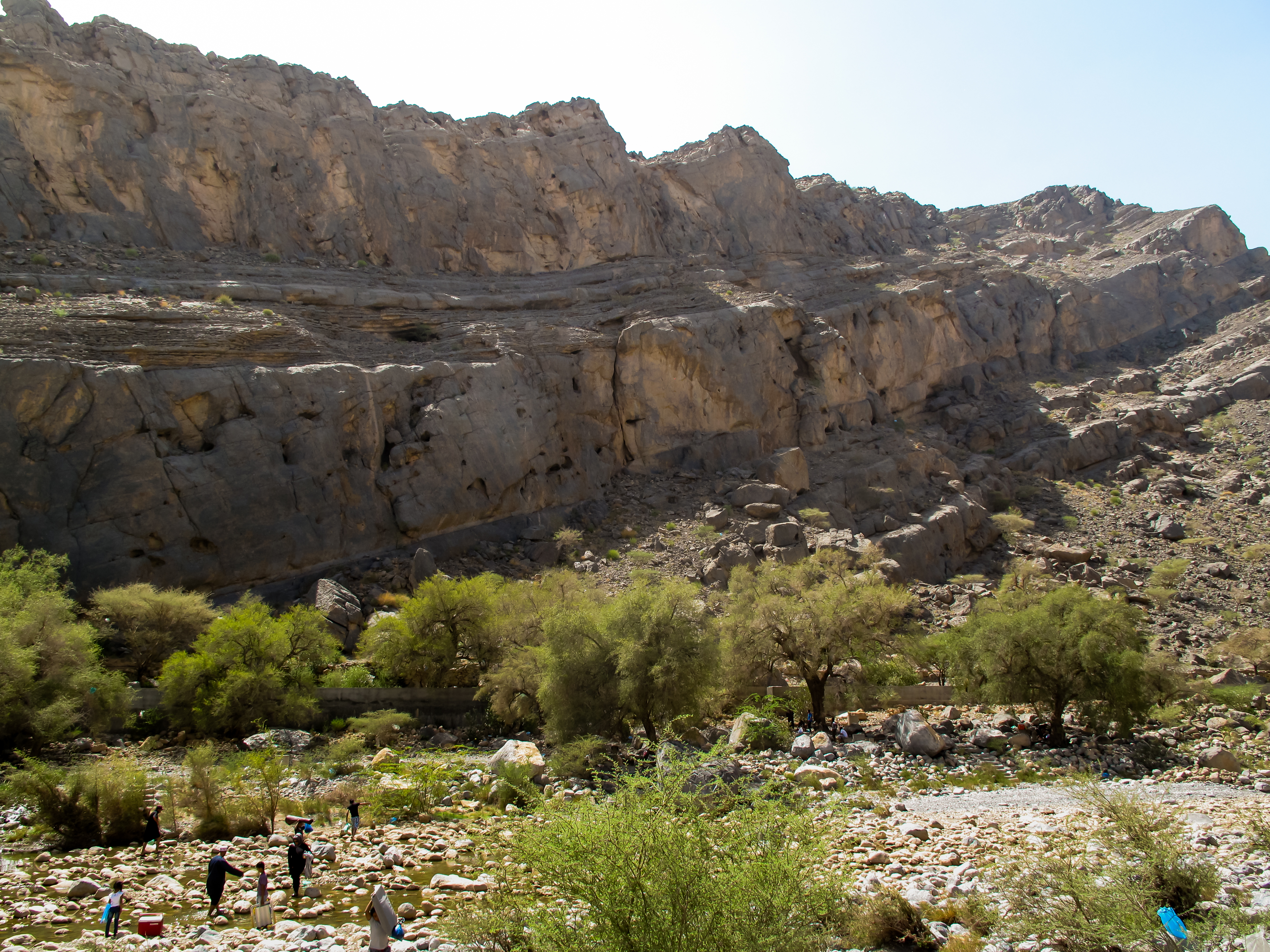
Teams ended this leg in Oman's Wadi Tanuf, located at the outskirt of Nizwa.

- Episode 10: “I'm Telling You Right Now There's No Giving Up” (13 November 2008)
- Prize: US$2,500 for each team member, courtesy of Standard Chartered Bank (awarded to Ida & Tania)
- Eliminated: A.D. & Fuzzie

Locations

- Pune (Gokhale Institute)
- Bhaje (Bhaja Caves)
- Malavli (Malavli Railway Station) → Pune (Pune Central Railway Station)
- Pune (Pune Central Railway Station – Mahatma Gandhi Statue)
- Pune (Jangali Maharaj Road – Standard Chartered Bank)
- Pune (Pune Airport) → Muscat, Oman (Muscat International Airport)
- Muscat (Al Alam Palace)
- Nizwa (Nizwa Fort)
- Muttrah (Muttrah Souq)
- Al Jabal Al Akhdar (Wadi Tanuf)

Episode summary

- At the start of the leg, teams had to travel to Bhaja Caves to search the area for their next clue, directing them to travel by train back to Pune, where they must search the grounds nearby for a statue of "one of India's most revered leader" outside the railway station, later known as Mahatma Gandhi. There, teams must take a particular note from the name plate before heading to their next destination.
- The clue instructed teams to take them at Jangali Maharaj Road to find Standard Chartered Bank where they had to insert an ATM card and punch in Gandhi's birth year: (1869 → 1-8-6-9) as the PIN to receive their next clue printed on the receipt. If a team made three unsuccessful attempts, they would incur a ten-minute time penalty before receiving their next clue.
- The clue teams were instructed to fly to Muscat, Oman. Once there, teams had to search the airport’s parking to locate a marked vehicle with their next clue at the top of it, directing them to Al Alam Palace to find their next clue, direct them to drive to Nizwa Fort, where they had to search for the correct clue box containing their next clue from among the other clue boxes scattered around the fort.
- This leg's Detour was a choice between Carpet and Count It. In Carpet, teams would have had to walk to a carpet shop and find two matching carpets, using the images in a Sony Cyber-shot as a reference, to receive their next clue from the shopkeeper. In Count It, teams had to walk to a shop and count the dried limes. Once each team gave their correct individual amount (1601, 1595, 1598, or 1577), the shop owner would hand them their next clue, directing them to drive to Wadi Tanuf. All teams chose Count It.
- In this leg's Roadblock, one team member had to tyrolean traverse across Wadi Tanuf to retrieve their next clue on the other side before pulling themselves back across to reunite with their partner and directly them to the Pit Stop.

Additional note

- Sam & Fuzzie elected to quit the Roadblock and take the 4-hour penalty. Vince & Sam were issued their 4-hour penalty that were applied at the start of the next leg, while A.D. & Fuzzie were eliminated without being issued their penalty.

=== Leg 11 (Oman → Thailand) ===
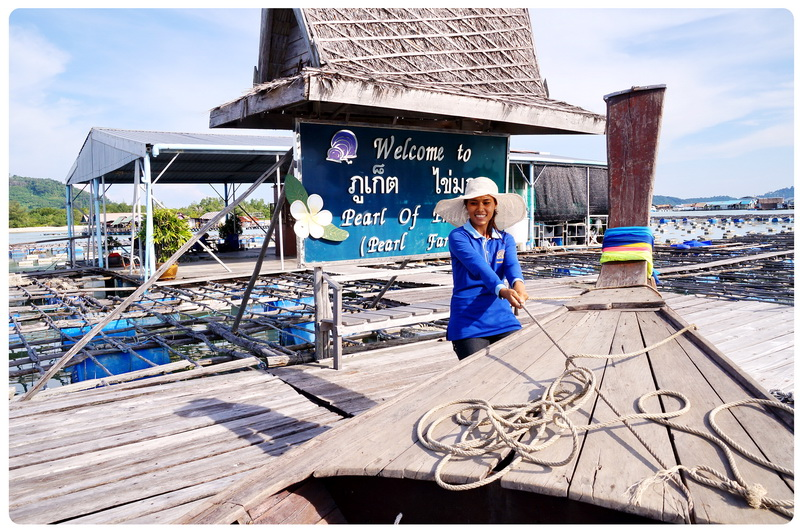
The final Detour of the race in Phuket Province paid tribute to the pearl cultivation of Thailand.

- Episode 11: “The Moment You've Been Racing for and The Moment We've Been Waiting For” (20 November 2008)
- Prize: US$100,000
- Winners: Vince & Sam
- Runners-up: Geoff & Tisha
- Third place: Ida & Tania

Locations

- Al Jabal Al Akhdar (Wadi Tanuf)
- Muscat (Governorate of Muscat Offices)
- Al Batinah (Al Abyadh – Said's Camel Farm)
- Al Batinah (Hubra Sands)
- Muscat (Muscat International Airport) → Phuket, Thailand (Phuket International Airport)
- Mueang Phuket (Sam Kong Temple)
- Mueang Phuket (Sirey Island – Thai Trade Food Ice Factory)
- Mueang Phuket (Laem Hin Pier) → Ao Phang Nga National Park (Boat between Cape Yamu and Rang Noi Island)
- Ao Phang Nga National Park (Rang Yai Island – Rang Yai Pearl Farm or Andaman Sea)
- Ao Phang Nga National Park (Rang Yai Island – Rang Yai Beach)
- Ao Phang Nga National Park (Rang Yai Island – Coconut Plantation)

Episode summary

- At the start of the leg, teams had to drive themselves to Governorate of Muscat Offices in Muscat, where they would find their next clue, directing them to Said’s Camel Farm, where they had to move ten camels into the holding pens before receiving their next clue.
- In this season's final Roadblock, one team member had to find one of seven keys out of seventy buried in the sand, using a metal detector, that would unlock a clue box to pick up their clue.
- After the Roadblock, teams were instructed to fly to Phuket, Thailand. Once there, teams made their way to Sam Kong Temple where they would have to find their next clue, directing them to Thai Trade Food Ice Factory where they had to find a small clear cube buried in a barrel of ice shavings to get their next clue, instructed them to travel to Laem Hin Pier, where they had to ride a traditional Thai fishing boat, known as the long-tail boat, and look for a fisherman in a marked boat located between Cape Yamu and Rang Noi Island to receive their next clue.
- This season's final Detour was a choice between Pull or Plunge. In Pull, teams had to kayak to Rang Yai pearl farm and find a marked shell by pulling from among 900 oyster lines. Then teams had to bring the marked shell back to the beach to exchange it for their next clue. In Plunge, teams had to snorkel and search for a giant clam shell containing a pearl, which they could exchange their next clue.
- After the Detour, teams had to dig up a treasure chest within a marked area and carry it to the Finish Line at the nearby coconut plantation.

== Reception ==
=== Awards ===
In 2009, the series was nominated for an International Emmy Award for Best Non-Scripted Entertainment, losing to the Dutch reality series The Phone.
