= Mae Tha =

Mae Tha may refer to:

- Mae Tha District, Lampang
- Mae Tha District, Lamphun
- Mae Tha Subdistrict, Chiang Mai
