= Wat Khantha Phueksa =

Thai Buddhist temple

- วัดคันธาพฤกษา
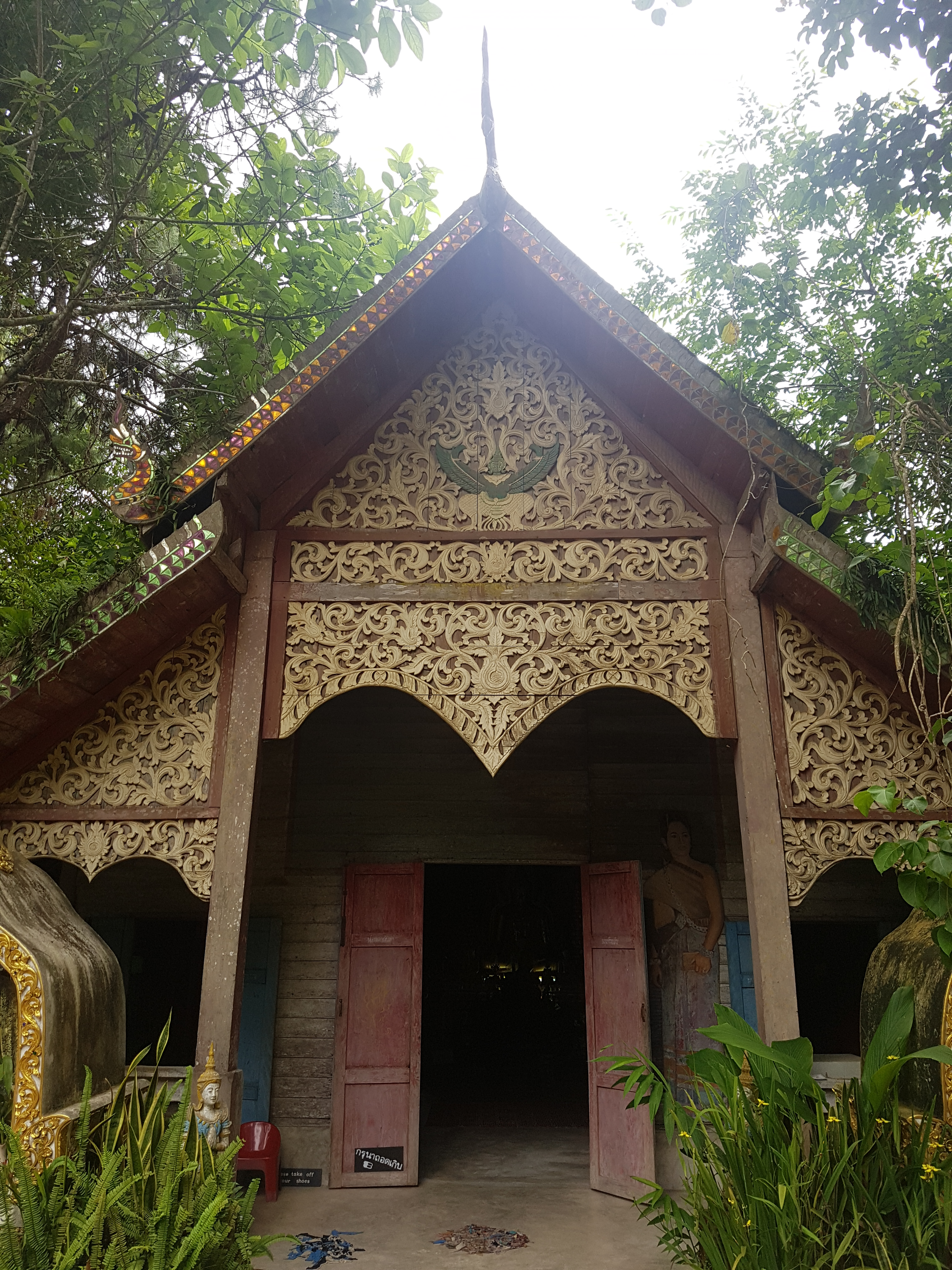
- Wat Khantha Phrueska

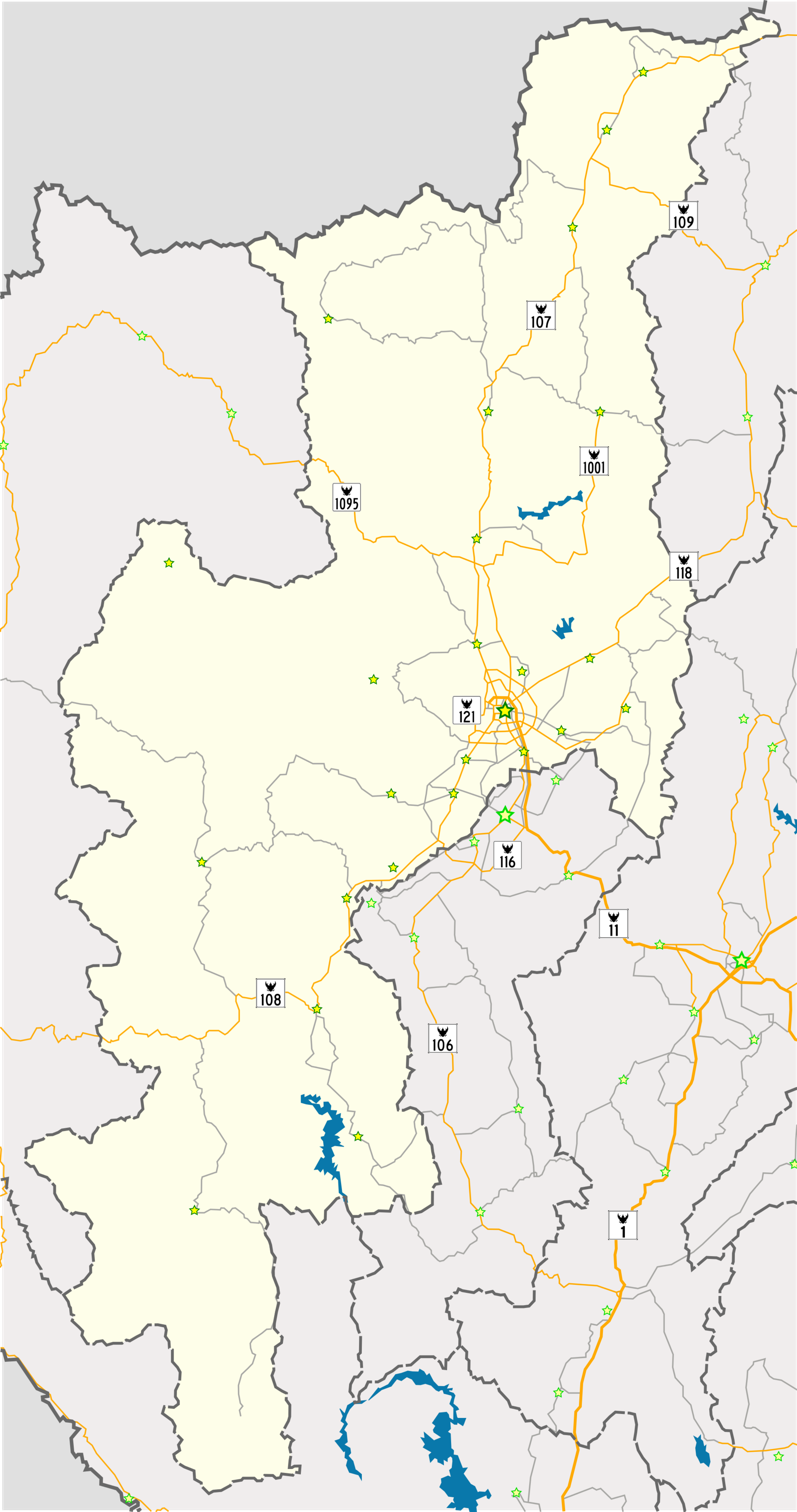
- Location within Chiang Mai Province Location within Thailand

Religion
- Affiliation: Buddhism
- District: Mae On district
- Province: Chiang Mai Province
- Region: Northern Thailand
- Status: Active

Location
- Municipality: Chiang Mai
- Country: Thailand

Architecture
- Style: Lanna
- Established: circa 1925
- Completed: 1930

Wat Khantha Phueksa (วัดคันธาพฤกษา), also known as Wat Mae Kampong (วัดแม่กำปอง), is a Buddhist temple nestled in the idyllic village of Mae Kampong, Mae On district, about 50 kilometers east of Chiang Mai, Thailand.

== History ==
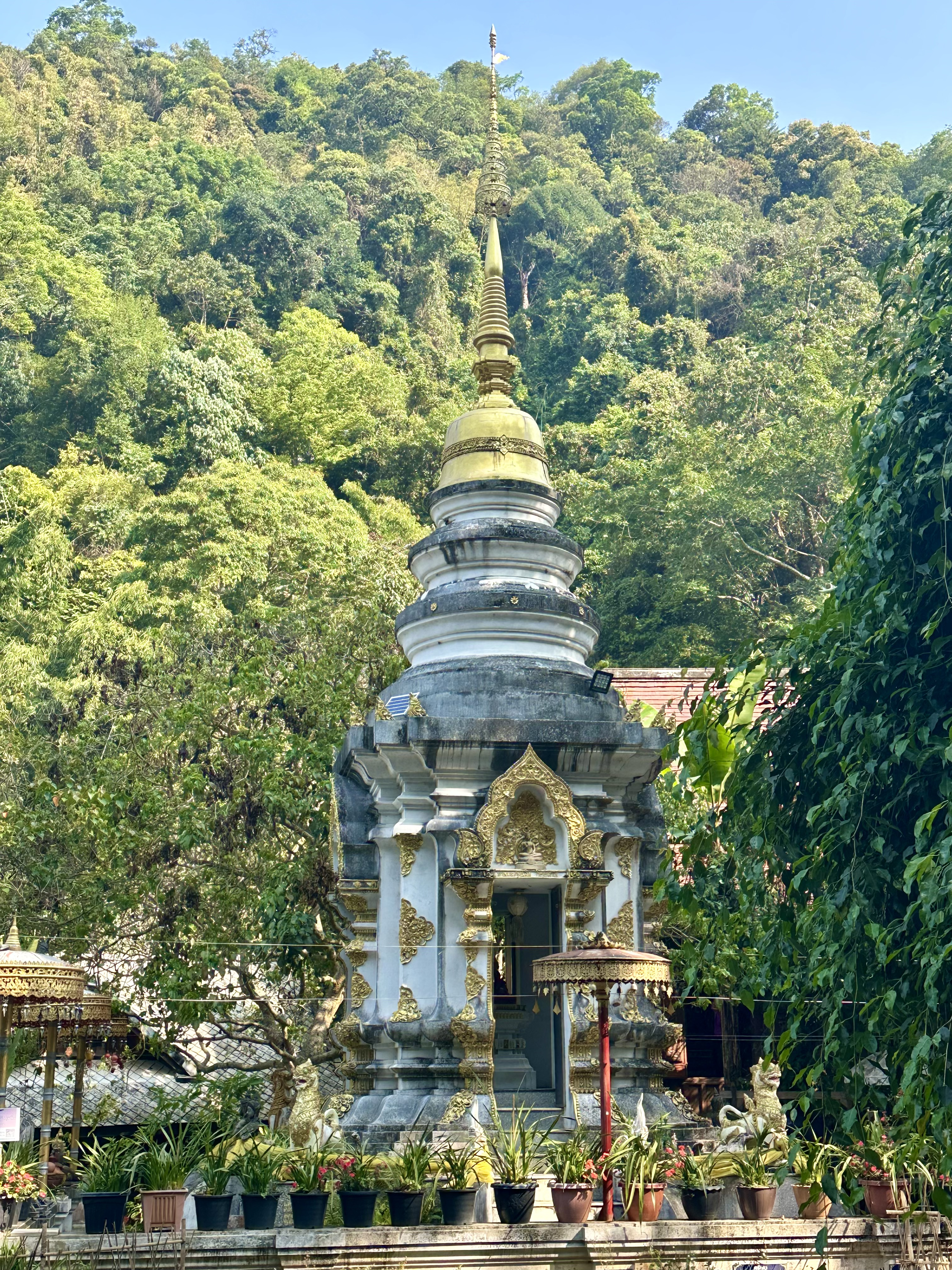
The white chedi of Wat Khantha Phueksa

The exact origins of Wat Khantha Phueksa remain unknown. Initially, around 1925, it existed as a hermitage at the foot of a hill, approximately 300 meters from the village. Subsequently, it was relocated to the heart of the village. Historically, the road passed only along the northern side of the temple. However, with the village's growth, a new road was constructed, now cutting through the southern side. The hermitage was renovated into a temple in 1930.

The temple's name, "Wat Khantha Phueksa", is derived from the nickname of Kruba Insom Khanthornso, a monk who spearheaded its construction on his sister's land. The name "Khantha Phrueska" is a reference to the lush forest of Khao Lam Nao Phrai that surrounds the temple.

The important buildings and structures include the Ubosot (ordination hall) in the middle of the water (Ukkhasema), of which only two remain in the northern region. The other one is at Wat Si Sutthawat Enmeku (Wat Phutthaen), in Mae Chaem District, Chiang Mai Province. There is also a Vihara (hall) made of carved teakwood in Lanna style, as well as a Stupa (pagoda) painted white. The construction of these structures was funded by the annual Poi Luang festival, a major religious event in the northern region. The ritual of washing the Buddha's relics is held every year during the eighth lunar month, or June.
