= Huai Kaeo =

Huai Kaeo may refer to:

- Huai Kaeo, Chiang Mai, a subdistrict (tambon) in Mae On District, Chiang Mai, Thailand
- Huai Kaeo Subdistrict in Phu Kamyao District, Phayao, Thailand
- Huai Kaeo Subdistrict in Bueng Na Rang District, Phichit, Thailand
- Huai Kaeo, a former name of Ban Mi District, Lop Buri, Thailand
  - Huai Kaeo railway station, which serves the district
