= On Nuea =

On Nuea ออนเหนือ
- Tambon
- Interactive map of On Nuea
- Coordinates: 18°47′20″N 99°15′11″E
- Country: Thailand
- Province: Chiang Mai
- Amphoe: Mae On

Population (2018)
  - Total: 3,297
- Time zone: UTC+7 (TST)
- Postal code: 50130
- TIS 1099: 502301

On Nuea (Thai: ออนเหนือ) is a tambon (subdistrict) of Mae On District, in Chiang Mai Province, Thailand. In 2018 it had a total population of 3,297 people.

== Administration ==
=== Central administration ===
The tambon is subdivided into 10 administrative villages (muban).

No.	Name	Thai
1.	Ban Mae Ruam	บ้านแม่รวม
2.	Ban Nong Hoi	บ้านหนองหอย
3.	Ban Khun On	บ้านขุนออน
4.	Ban Mae Wong	บ้านแม่วอง
5.	Ban Hua Fai	บ้านหัวฝาย
6.	Ban On Lai	บ้านออนหลวย
7.	Ban On Lai	บ้านออนหลวย
8.	Ban Don Sai	บ้านดอนทราย
9.	Ban Khun Tha	บ้านขุนทา
10.	Ban Mae Pa Khang	บ้านแม่ป่าขาง

=== Local administration ===
The whole area of the subdistrict is covered by the subdistrict administrative organization (SAO) On Nuea (องค์การบริหารส่วนตำบลออนเหนือ).
