= Ban Sahakon =

Ban Sahakon บ้านสหกรณ์
- Tambon
- Country: Thailand
- Province: Chiang Mai
- Amphoe: Mae On

Population (2018)
  - Total: 3,365
- Time zone: UTC+7 (TST)
- Postal code: 50130
- TIS 1099: 502303

Ban Sahakon (Thai: บ้านสหกรณ์) is a tambon (subdistrict) of Mae On District, in Chiang Mai Province, Thailand. In 2018, it had a total population of 3,365 people.

== History ==
The subdistrict was created effective May 1, 1978 by splitting off 7 administrative villages from Rong Wua Daeng, On Nuea, Huai Kaeo.

== Administration ==
=== Central administration ===
The tambon is subdivided into 8 administrative villages (muban).

No.	Name	Thai
1.	Ban Sahakon 1	บ้านสหกรณ์ 1
2.	Ban Sahakon 2	บ้านสหกรณ์ 2
3.	Ban Sahakon 3	บ้านสหกรณ์ 3
4.	Ban Sahakon 4	บ้านสหกรณ์ 4
5.	Ban Sahakon 5	บ้านสหกรณ์ 5
6.	Ban Sahakon 6	บ้านสหกรณ์ 6
7.	Ban Sahakon 7	บ้านสหกรณ์ 7
8.	Ban Sahakon 8	บ้านสหกรณ์ 8

=== Local administration ===
The whole area of the subdistrict is covered by the subdistrict administrative organization (SAO) Ban Sahakon (องค์การบริหารส่วนตำบลบ้านสหกรณ์).

== Economy ==
The tambon is home to Mae On Weavers, a group of 100 weavers who make hand-knitted products sold under the banner of Thailand's "One Tambon One Product" (OTOP) program.
