= Tha Nuea =

Tha Nuea ทาเหนือ
- Tambon
- Country: Thailand
- Province: Chiang Mai
- Amphoe: Mae On

Population (2018)
  - Total: 2,445
- Time zone: UTC+7 (TST)
- Postal code: 50130
- TIS 1099: 502306

Tha Nuea (Thai: ทาเหนือ) is a tambon (subdistrict) of Mae On District, in Chiang Mai Province, Thailand. In 2018 it had a total population of 2,445 people.

== Administration ==
=== Central administration ===
The tambon is subdivided into 5 administrative villages (muban).

No.	Name	Thai
1.	Ban Mae Takhrai	บ้านแม่ตะไคร้
2.	Ban Mai Don Kaeo	บ้านใหม่ดอนแก้ว
3.	Ban Huai Bong	บ้านห้วยบง
4.	Ban Pa Ngio	บ้านป่างิ้ว
5.	Ban Huai Yap	บ้านห้วยยาบ

=== Local administration ===
The whole area of the subdistrict is covered by the subdistrict administrative organization (SAO) Tha Nuea (องค์การบริหารส่วนตำบลทาเหนือ).
