= On Klang =

On Klang ออนกลาง
- Tambon
- Country: Thailand
- Province: Chiang Mai
- Amphoe: Mae On

Population (2018)
  - Total: 4,875
- Time zone: UTC+7 (TST)
- Postal code: 50130
- TIS 1099: 502302

On Klang (Thai: ออนกลาง) is a tambon (subdistrict) of Mae On District, in Chiang Mai Province, Thailand. In 2018 it had a total population of 4,875 people.

== Administration ==
=== Central administration ===
The tambon is subdivided into 11 administrative villages (muban).

| No. | Name | Thai |
|---|---|---|
| 1. | Ban Thung Lao | บ้านทุ่งเหล่า |
| 2. | Ban Mae Lem | บ้านแม่เลน |
| 3. | Ban Pao Sam Kha | บ้านเปาสามขา |
| 4. | Ban Wak | บ้านวาก |
| 5. | Ban Pa Tan | บ้านป่าตัน |
| 6. | Ban Pa Tan | บ้านป่าตัน |
| 7. | Ban On Klang | บ้านออนกลาง |
| 8. | Ban On Klang | บ้านออนกลาง |
| 9. | Ban On Klang | บ้านออนกลาง |
| 10. | Ban Pa Mai | บ้านป่าไม้ |
| 11. | Ban On Klang Nuea | บ้านออนกลางเหนือ |

=== Local administration ===
The whole area of the subdistrict is covered by the subdistrict administrative organization (SAO) On Klang (องค์การบริหารส่วนตำบลออนกลาง).
