= Mae Kampong =

Village in northern Thailand

Coordinates: 18.8655°N 99.3510°E

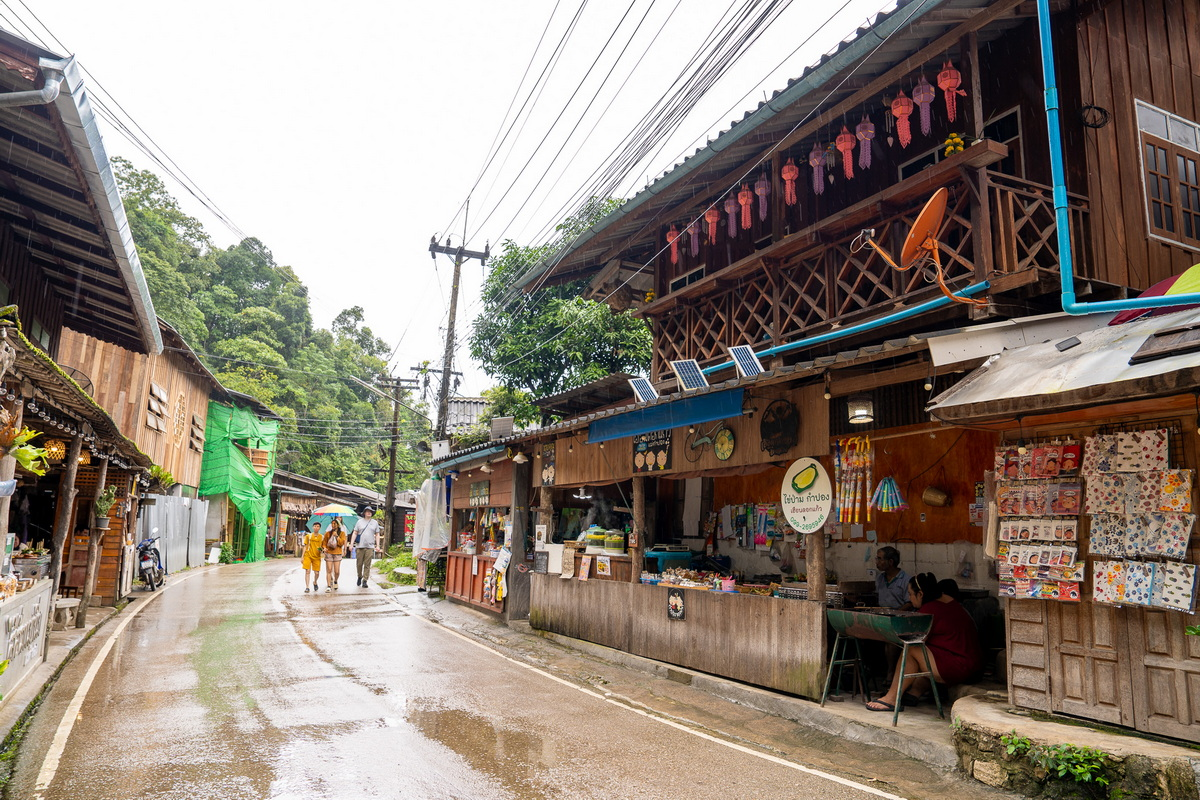
Mae Kampong

Mae Kampong (Thai: แม่กำปอง) is a small village in the Huai Kaeo subdistrict of the Mae On District, Chiang Mai Province, 50 km east of the city of Chiang Mai, in northern Thailand. Its population is about 370. Largely traditional agriculture, teas, coffees, rice. It is also a site of a Thai Royal Projects where high value plants are grown for market.

It is a home-stay village and tourists are welcome to stay with a family as a guest and to partake in daily life such as growing crops, looking after animals, cutting bamboo etc. It has a small hydro-electric power station of capacity 40 kW which also exports to the national grid. The project began in 1983.

Access to the village is by steep winding narrow road suitable only for small vehicles.

== Geography ==
Mae Kampong village is in Mae On District, about 50 kilometers northeast of Chiang Mai province, in northern of Thailand. Mae Kampong Village has 120 families, with about 500 population. The total area of the village is about 6.22 square kilometers. The terrain is generally highland and up to 1,300 meters above sea level.

== Weather ==
The village is mostly cold and humid throughout the year.

== History ==
Mae Kampong is a small village located near the creek surrounded by yellow flowers called Kampong flower. Hence, the name of the village. It is the name of the flowers combined with the word 'Mae' from the river that pass through the village. Mae Kampong Village is about 100 years old. Although the village of Baan Mae Kampong was not officially founded until the early 1900s, it is thought that the first farmers moved to the area from nearby Doi Saket more than 200 years ago so most of the population migrated from Doi Saket for agriculture. Then the settlers came here to do agriculture which were to make a local delicacy known as Mieng from fermented tea leaves. Over the years, the demand for Mieng dropped and the villagers started to look for other sources of income.

- In the 1980s, the people of Mae Kampong began growing coffee under the Royal Project. The villagers also used the stream running through the village to produce hydro-electric power.
- In the 1990s, Thai government encouraged each sub-district or Tambon to produce a product, service or activity that could be associated to what is called OTOP (Thaizer, 2018). The idea of OTOP was initially a concern for the village headman until he decided to propose Mae Kampong as an eco-tourism village to take advantage of the natural surroundings. Mae Kampong accommodation program has proven to be a big success benefiting visitors and villagers alike. The village acts as a co-operative with the revenue brought into the village used to help local projects to support the community. Afterwards, the village won awards of accommodation and various eco-tourism initiatives.

== Traditions and culture ==
- A traditional northern Thai dinner is laid out on a circular tray known as a khan-toke, filled with delicious Lanna food.
- New Year's Day or the Songkran Festival in April. There will be a Lanna style of the North, such as building a sand dune in village's temple.
- Sibsongpeng or the twelfth Day of twelfth celebrated on the 15th day of the lunar month, which usually corresponds to September. This is a dedication to charity for the ancestors who died. Together, villagers build sand pagodas or the sand pile inside the temple.

== Landmarks ==
=== Wat Khantha Phueksa (Wat Mae Kampong) ===
Wat Khantha Phueksa is situated in the heart of the village and serves as its main temple. The village and the temple are built together with the community settlement. The chapel is in the middle of the pond; the old temple made from hardwood and crafted teak wood in Lanna design.

=== Flight of the Gibbon ===
Eco-tourism at Mae Kampong was supported by the ziplining company, Flight of the Gibbon. The adventure activity brings tourists to the area who might have not ever visited the place and experienced the local way of life and traditional Lanna hospitality which is found in Mae Kampong.

=== Mae Kampong Waterfall ===
Mae Kampong Waterfall is the origin of the creek that runs through the village. Some seven stories in height, it is situated at the far end of the village, and offers clear cold water and banks covered in ferns and moss.

== Other resources ==
- Website information
