= Huai Kaeo, Chiang Mai =

Coordinates: 18.8655°N 99.3510°E

Huai Kaeo ห้วยแก้ว
- Tambon
- Interactive map of Huai Kaeo
- Country: Thailand
- Province: Chiang Mai
- Amphoe: Mae On

Population (2018)
  - Total: 2,819
- Time zone: UTC+7 (TST)
- Postal code: 50130
- TIS 1099: 502304

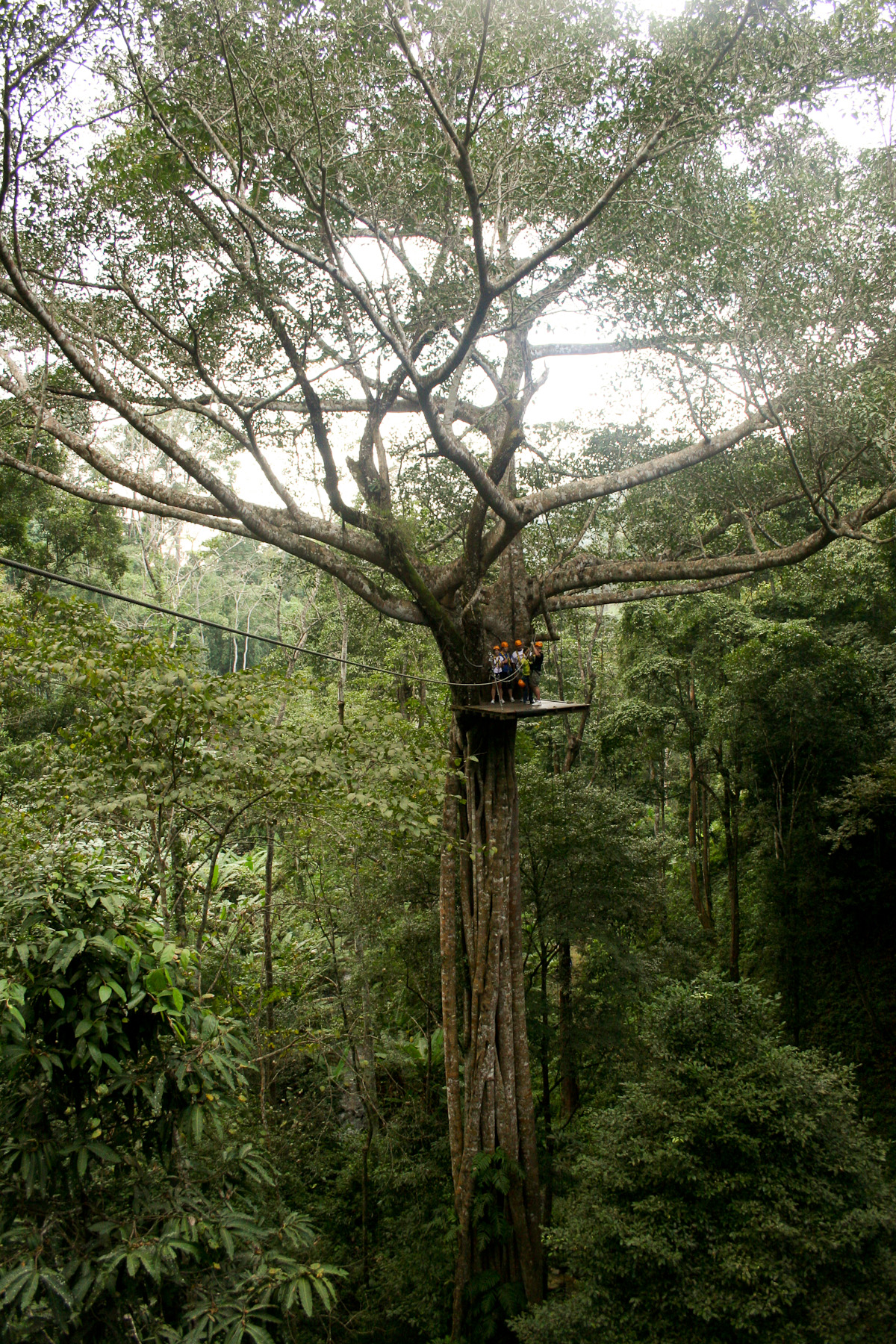

Huai Kaeo (Thai: ห้วยแก้ว) is a tambon (subdistrict) of Mae On District, in Chiang Mai Province, Thailand. In 2018, it had a total population of 2,819 people.

== Administration ==
=== Central administration ===
The tambon is subdivided into 8 administrative villages (muban).

No.	Name	Thai
1.	Ban Pok	บ้านป๊อก
2.	Ban Mae Lai	บ้านแม่ลาย
3.	Ban Mae Kampong	บ้านแม่กำปอง
4.	Ban Mae Tao Din	บ้านแม่เตาดิน
5.	Ban Huai Kaeo	บ้านห้วยแก้ว
6.	Ban Pang Kong	บ้านปางกอง
7.	Ban Pang Champi	บ้านปางจำปี
8.	Ban Than Thong	บ้านธารทอง

=== Local administration ===
The whole area of the subdistrict is covered by the subdistrict administrative organization (SAO) Huai Kaeo (องค์การบริหารส่วนตำบลห้วยแก้ว).
