= Flight of the Gibbon =

Zipline tour operator in Thailand

Flight of the Gibbon is the first zipline tour operator in Thailand, located in Mae Kham Pong (near Chiang Mai) and Chonburi (near Bangkok and Pattaya). The company is particularly known for its original 33 platform course through the Thai jungle that includes Asia's longest single flight. As of 2019, there has been several injuries and a death on the zipline attraction. Flight of the Gibbon in Chiang Mai is reported as definitively closed as of may 2025.
