= Mae Tha, Chiang Mai =

Mae Tha แม่ทา
- Tambon
- Country: Thailand
- Province: Chiang Mai
- Amphoe: Mae On

Population (2018)
  - Total: 4,514
- Time zone: UTC+7 (TST)
- Postal code: 50130
- TIS 1099: 502305

Mae Tha (Thai: แม่ทา) is a tambon (subdistrict) of Mae On District, in Chiang Mai Province, Thailand. In 2018 it had a total population of 4,514 people.

== Administration ==
=== Central administration ===
The tambon is subdivided into 7 administrative villages (muban).

No.	Name	Thai
1.	Ban Tha Mon	บ้านทาม่อน
2.	Ban Tha Kham	บ้านท่าข้าม
3.	Ban Kho Klang	บ้านค้อกลาง
4.	Ban Huai Sai	บ้านห้วยทราย
5.	Ban Pa Not	บ้านป่านอต
6.	Ban Don Chai	บ้านดอนชัย
7.	Ban Mai Don Chai	บ้านใหม่ดอนชัย

=== Local administration ===
The whole area of the subdistrict is covered by the subdistrict administrative organization (SAO) Mae Tha (องค์การบริหารส่วนตำบลแม่ทา).
