= Mae On district =

Mae On แม่ออน
- District
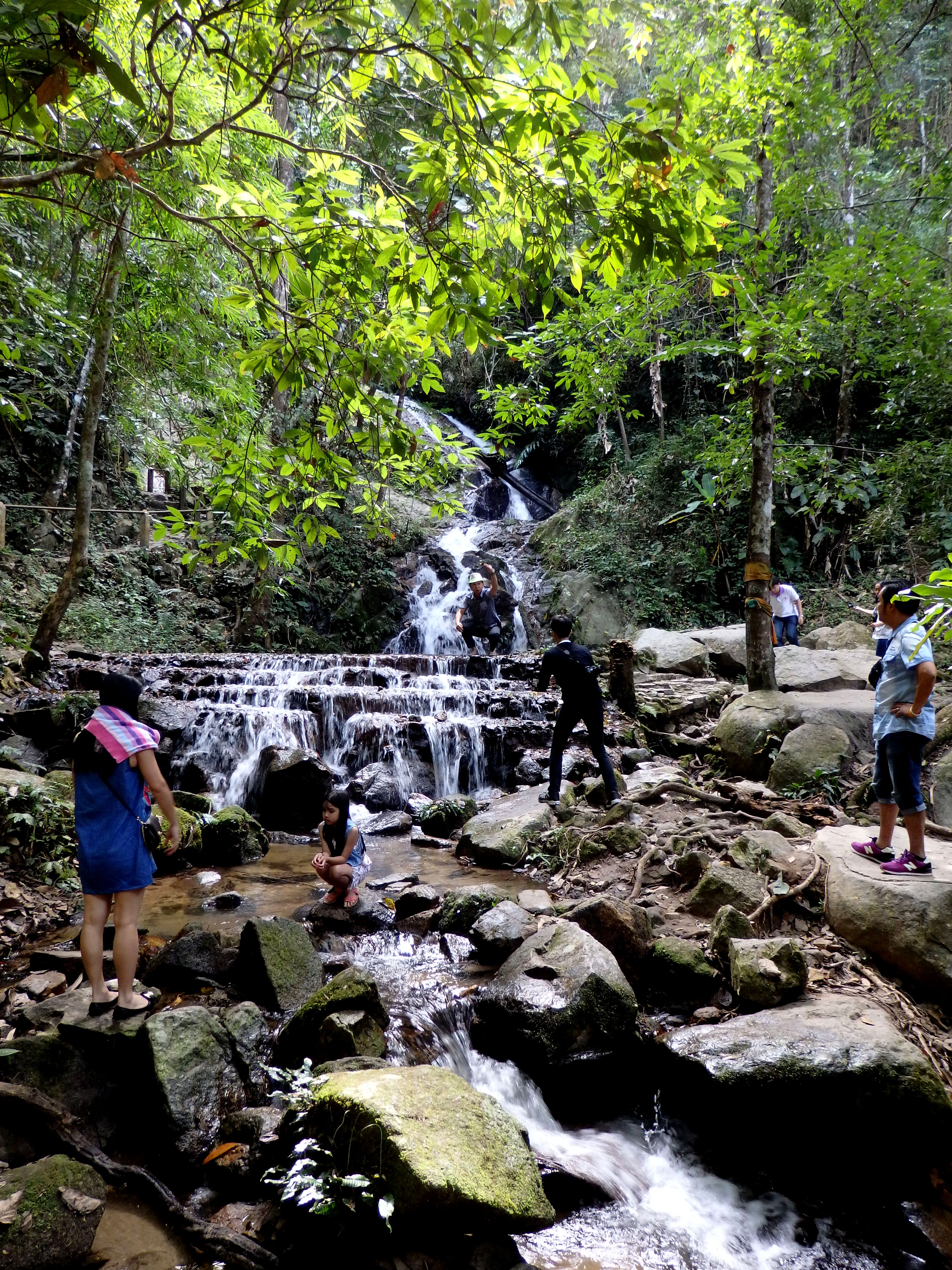
- A waterfall in Huai Kaew

- District location in Chiang Mai province
- Coordinates: 18°46′35″N 99°14′53″E
- Country: Thailand
- Province: Chiang Mai
- Seat: On Klang
- District established: 1994

Area
  - Total: 442.3 km^{2} (170.8 sq mi)

Population (2018)
  - Total: 21,315
  - Density: 49/km^{2} (130/sq mi)
- Time zone: UTC+7 (ICT)
- Postal code: 50130
- Geocode: 5023

Mae On (Thai: แม่ออน, pronounced [mɛ̂ː ʔɔ̄ːn]) is a district (amphoe) of Chiang Mai province in the north of Thailand.

== Geography ==
The district is about 40 km east of the city of Chiang Mai. Neighboring districts are (from the west clockwise) San Kamphaeng and Doi Saket of Chiang Mai Province; Mueang Pan and Mueang Lampang of Lampang province, Ban Thi, Mueang Lamphun and Mae Tha of Lamphun province.

Mae Ta Krai National Park protects the source of the On River (น้ำแม่ออน), a tributary of the Ping River that gives its name to the district.

Mae On is a popular destination for rock climbers who wish to climb the limestone cliffs of "Crazy Horse Buttress" in the Khun Tan Range. Other tourist attractions of the town include natural hot springs and the Mae On cave system.

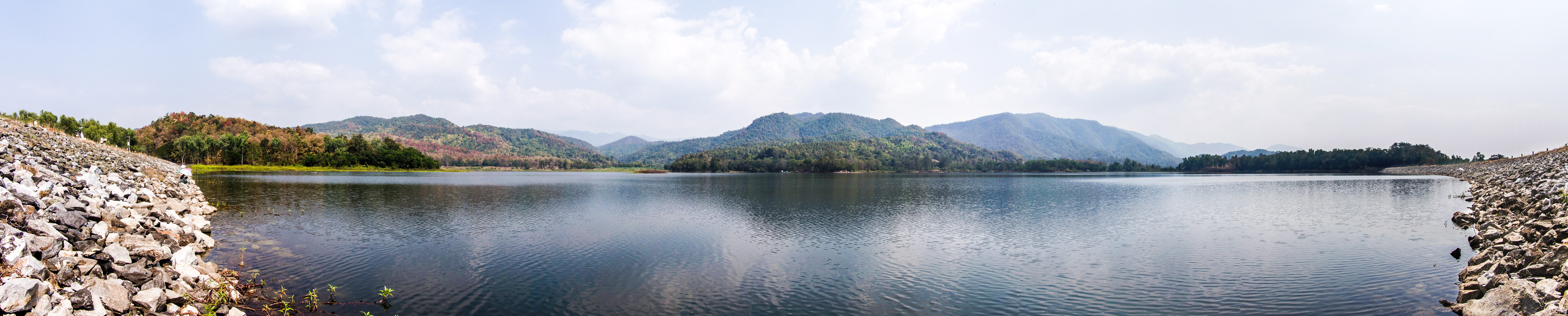
A panoramic view of the Mae On reservoir

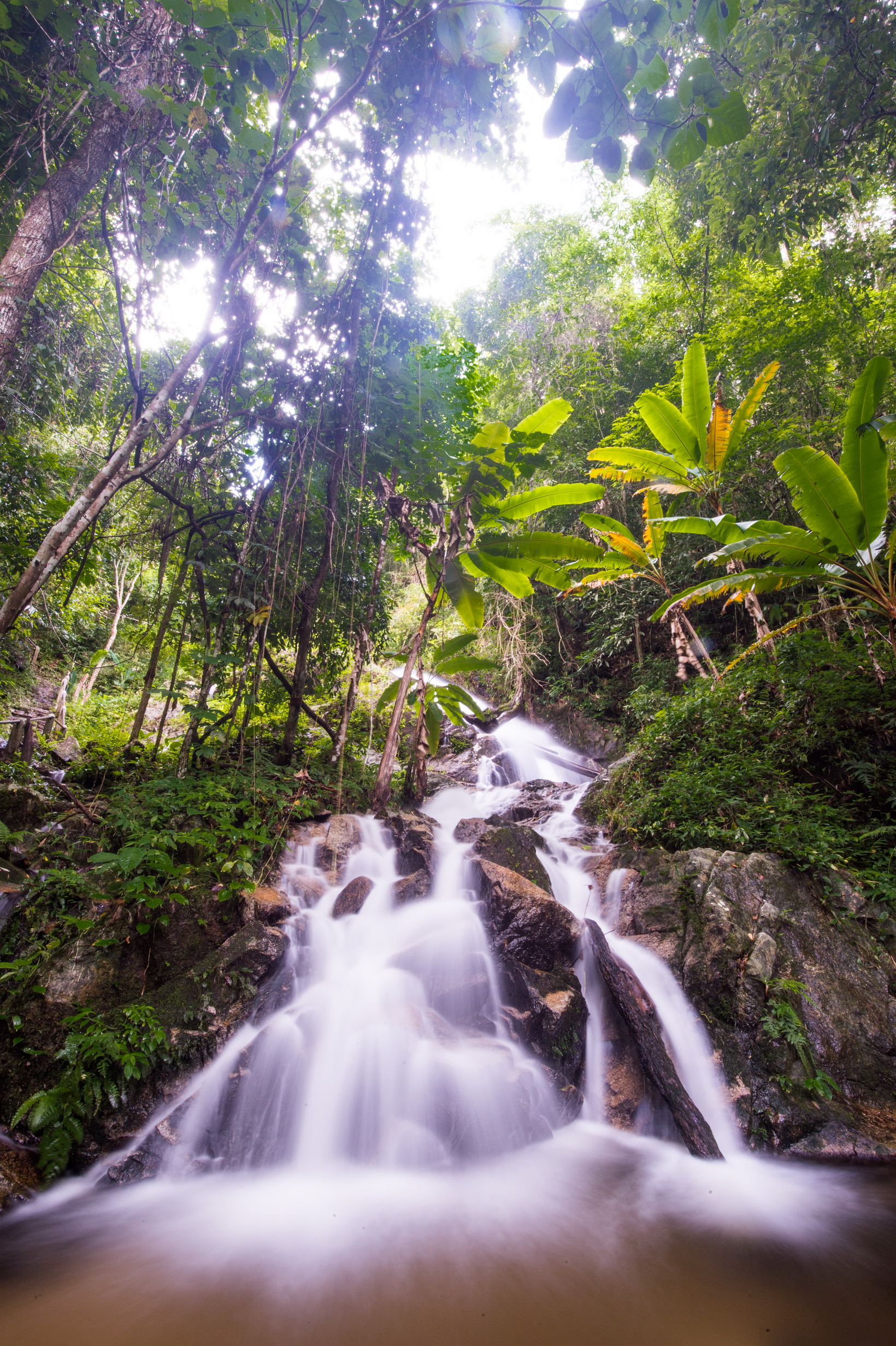
Mae Kampong waterfall

== History ==
The minor district (king amphoe) was created on 30 April 1994, when six tambons were split off from San Kamphaeng district.

On 15 May 2007, all 81 minor districts were upgraded to full districts. On 24 August the upgrade became official.

== Administration ==
=== Central administration ===
The district Mae On is subdivided into 6 subdistricts (Tambon), which are further subdivided into 49 administrative villages (Muban).

No.	Name	Thai	Villages	Pop.
1.	On Nuea	ออนเหนือ	10	3,297
2.	On Klang	ออนกลาง	11	4,875
3.	Ban Sahakon	บ้านสหกรณ์	8	3,365
4.	Huai Kaeo	ห้วยแก้ว	8	2,819
5.	Mae Tha	แม่ทา	7	4,514
6.	Tha Nuea	ทาเหนือ	5	2,445

=== Local administration ===
There are 6 subdistrict administrative organizations (SAO) in the district:

- On Nuea (Thai: องค์การบริหารส่วนตำบลออนเหนือ) consisting of the complete subdistrict On Nuea.
- On Klang (Thai: องค์การบริหารส่วนตำบลออนกลาง) consisting of the complete subdistrict On Klang.
- Ban Sahakon (Thai: องค์การบริหารส่วนตำบลบ้านสหกรณ์) consisting of the complete subdistrict Ban Sahakon.
- Huai Kaeo (Thai: องค์การบริหารส่วนตำบลห้วยแก้ว) consisting of the complete subdistrict Huai Kaeo.
- Mae Tha (Thai: องค์การบริหารส่วนตำบลแม่ทา) consisting of the complete subdistrict Mae Tha.
- Tha Nuea (Thai: องค์การบริหารส่วนตำบลทาเหนือ) consisting of the complete subdistrict Tha Nuea.
