= Pa Phai =

Pa Phai may refer to several places in Thailand:

- Pa Phai, Chiang Mai
- Pa Phai, Lamphun
