= Li district =

Li ลี้
- District
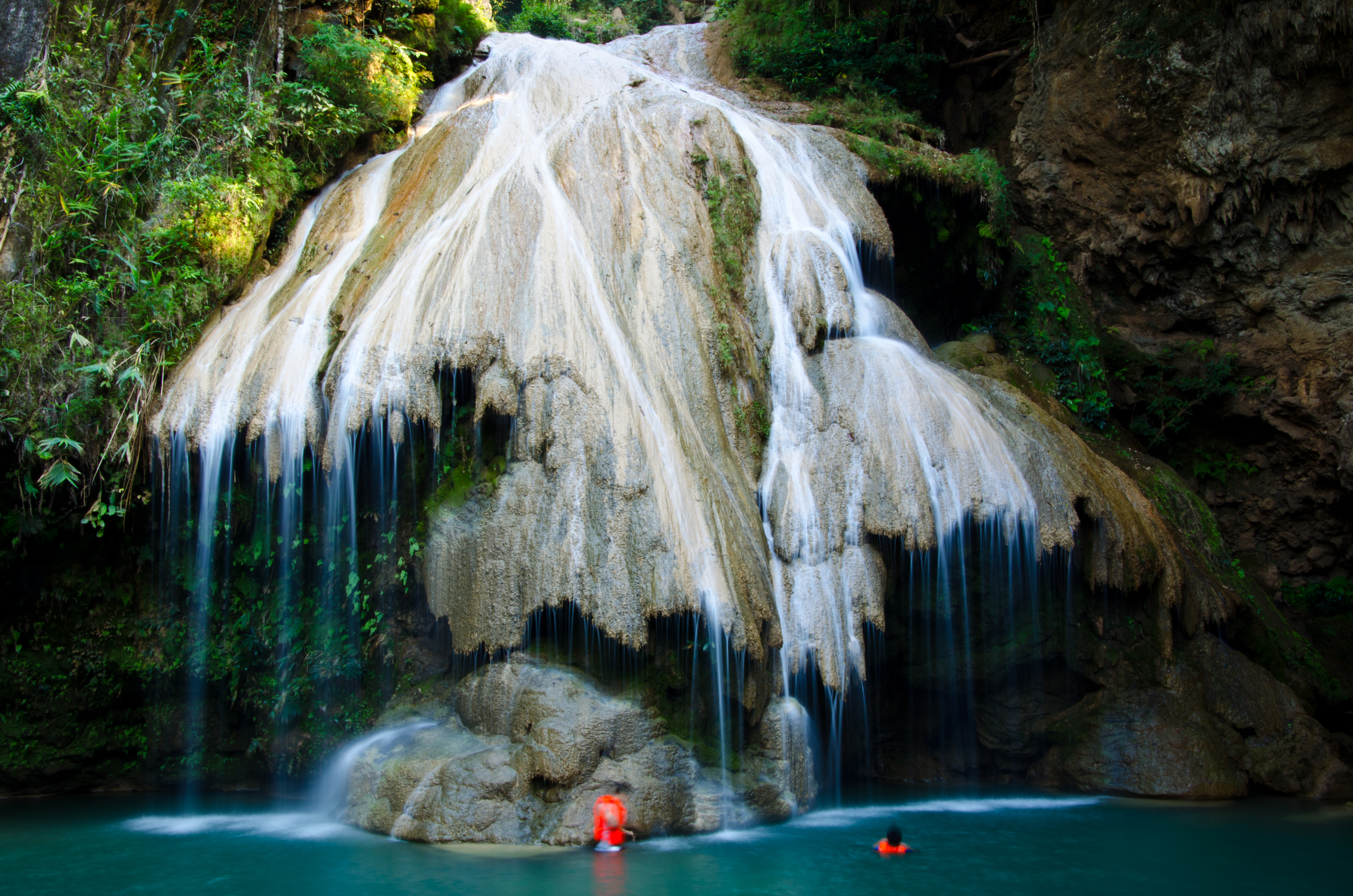
- Ko Luang Waterfall, Ko, Li district

- District location in Lamphun province
- Coordinates: 17°48′12″N 98°57′0″E
- Country: Thailand
- Province: Lamphun
- Seat: Li

Area
  - Total: 1,701.990 km^{2} (657.142 sq mi)

Population (2005)
  - Total: 67,240
  - Density: 39.5/km^{2} (102/sq mi)
- Time zone: UTC+7 (ICT)
- Postal code: 51110
- Geocode: 5104

Li (Thai: ลี้, pronounced [líː]) is the southernmost district (amphoe) of Lamphun province, northern Thailand.

== History ==
Li district was established in 1911. By 1951, Li became the most common name in the early 20th century. Originally named Mueang Li, it was shortened to Li in 1917.

Li district is believed to have been an iron smelting site until the middle years of the Ayutthaya Kingdom (the reign of King Borommatrailokkanat), based on excavated ancient metal furnaces, about 2,000 years old in Mae Lan sub-district. Presumably that in the period 327–361 BC or 4th century Buddhist (before the rise of Hariphunchai Kingdom about 1,000 years ago).

== Geography ==
Neighboring districts are (from the north clockwise): Ban Hong, Thung Hua Chang of Lamphun Province, Soem Ngam, Thoen, Mae Phrik of Lampang province, Sam Ngao of Tak province, Doi Tao, Hot and Chom Thong of Chiang Mai province.

== Economy ==
The Ban Pu Coal Company Limited was established in 1983 to extract coal at the Banpu Mine (BP-1 Mine) in the Li District. The company is now known as Banpu and is the largest coal producer in Thailand.

== Administration ==
The district is divided into eight sub-districts (tambons), which are further subdivided into 99 villages (mubans). There are two townships (thesaban tambons): Wang Din covers parts of tambon Li, and Mae Tuen parts of the same-named tambon. There are a further eight tambon administrative organizations (TAO).

No.	Name	Thai name	Villages	Pop.
1.	Li	ลี้	17	13,463
2.	Mae Tuen	แม่ตืน	17	11,617
3.	Na Sai	นาทราย	23	16,645
4.	Dong Dam	ดงดำ	6	3,128
5.	Ko	ก้อ	4	2,425
6.	Mae Lan	แม่ลาน	7	3,017
8.	Pa Phai	ป่าไผ่	14	9,734
9.	Si Wichai	ศรีวิชัย	13	7,869

The missing number 7 belonged to the now defunct Ban Phai Subdistrict.
