= Wang River =

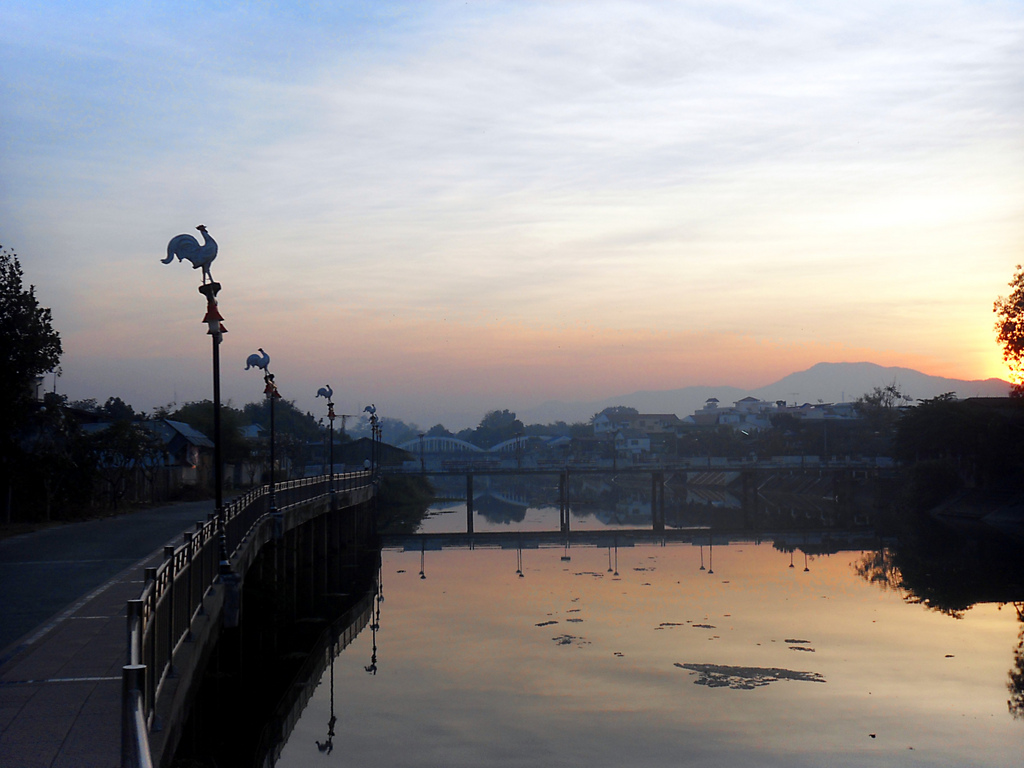
- Wang River in Lampang town
- Native name: แม่น้ำวัง (Thai)

Location
- Country: Thailand
- State: Chiang Rai Province, Lampang Province
- Region: Tak Province
- City: Lampang

Physical characteristics
- Source
  - location: Phi Pan Nam Range, Phan District, Chiang Rai Province
  - coordinates: 19°09′45″N 101°13′45″E
- Mouth: Ping River
  - location: West of Mae Salit, Ban Tak District, Tak Province
  - coordinates: 17°7′23″N 99°3′37″E
  - elevation: 128 m (420 ft)
- Length: 392 km (244 mi)
- Basin size: 10,794 km^{2} (4,168 sq mi)
- Discharge
  - location: Sam Ngao District
  - average: 52 m^{3}/s (1,800 cu ft/s)
  - minimum: 0 m^{3}/s (0 cu ft/s)
  - maximum: 1,100 m^{3}/s (39,000 cu ft/s)

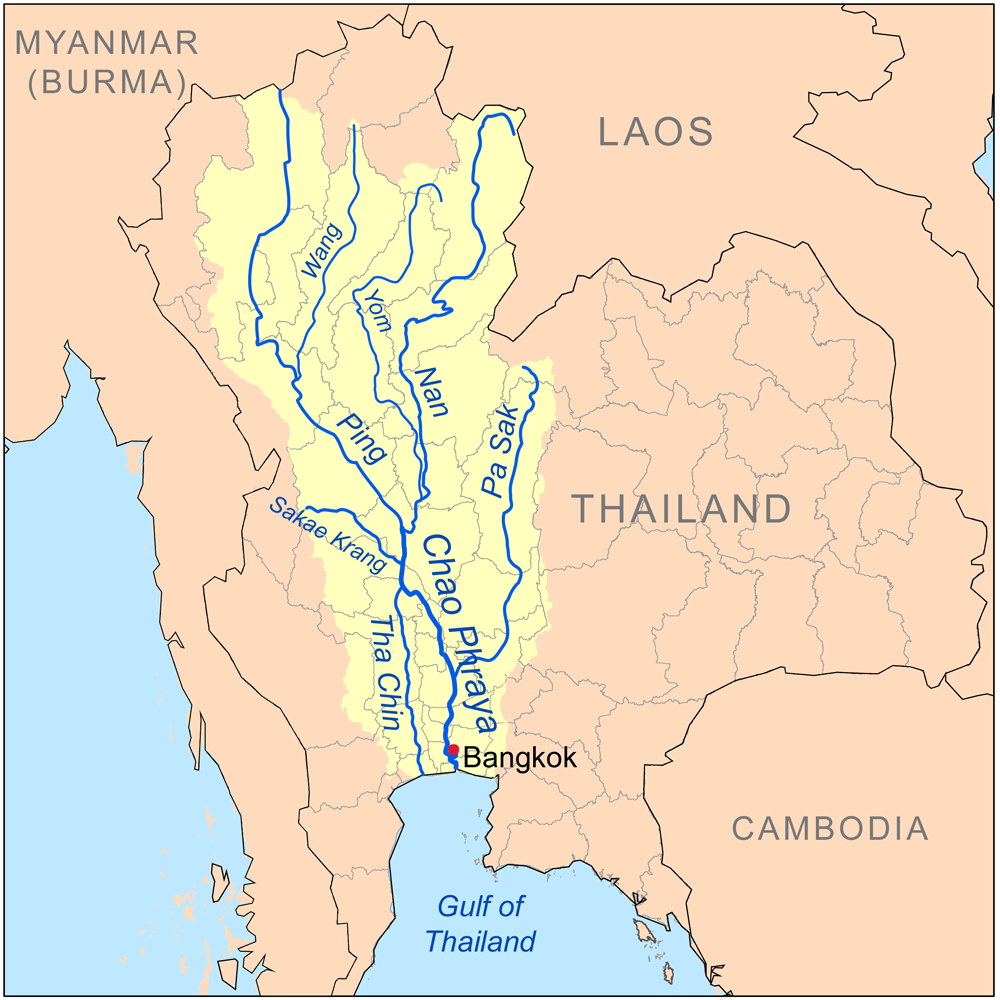
Map of the Chao Phraya River drainage basin showing the Wang River

The Wang River (Thai: แม่น้ำวัง, RTGS: Maenam Wang, pronounced [mɛ̂ː.náːm wāŋ]; Northern Thai: ᨶᩣᩴ᩶ᩯᨾ᩵ᩅᩢ᩠ᨦ, pronounced [náːm mɛ̂ː.wāŋ]) is a river in northern Thailand.

== Geography ==
The Wang River is 335 kilometres (208 mi) long. Its waters flow from north to south. The Wang River has its source in the Phi Pan Nam Range in Wiang Pa Pao District, Chiang Rai Province. One of the principal settlements along the river is Lampang, which is on the north bank of a curve in the river. From Lampang, the river flows southwards passing by Thoen into Tak Province. It joins the Ping River near Mae Salit, Ban Tak District, north of the town of Tak. The Ping River is a tributary of the Chao Phraya River.

== Tributaries ==
Tributaries of the Wang include the Mo, Tui, Chang, and Soi Rivers

== Wang basin ==
The Wang basin is part of the Greater Ping Basin and the Chao Phraya Watershed. The total land area drained by the Wang River and its tributaries is 10,792 square kilometres (4,167 mi^{2}).

Kiu Lom Dam (เขื่อนกิ่วลม) is on the Wang River about 38 kilometres (24 mi) from Lampang town.

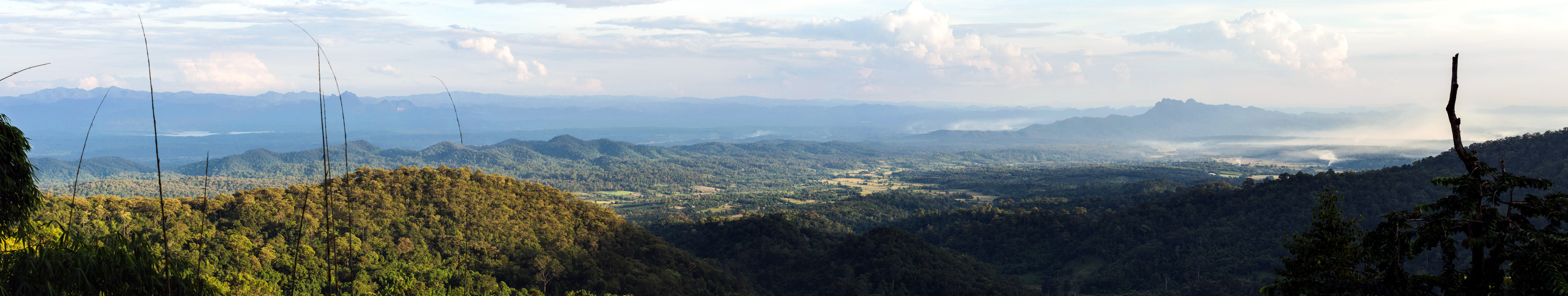
Wang River valley, Chae Hom District, with the mountains of the Phi Pan Nam Range in the distance, as seen from Rte 1252 in the mountains of the Khun Tan Range
