= Si Wichai =

Si Wichai is the Thai pronunciation of the name Srivijaya.

It may also refer to:

- Si Wichai, Lamphun, a subdistrict (tambon) in Lamphun Province, Thailand
- Si Wichai Subdistrict in Phunphin District, Surat Thani Province, Thailand
- Si Wichai Subdistrict in Wanon Niwat District, Sakon Nakhon Province, Thailand
