= Bhumibol Dam Airport =

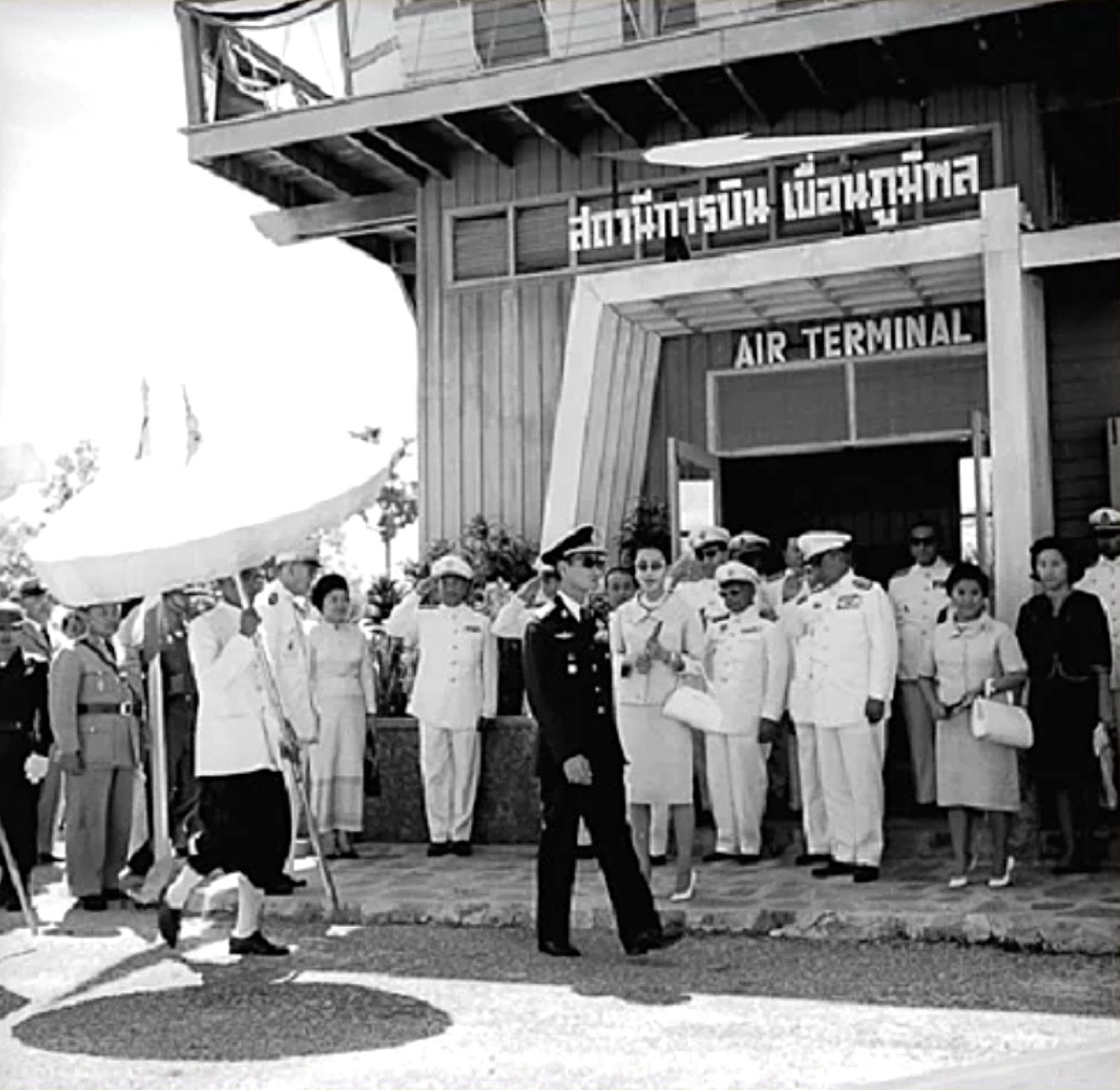
- His Majesty King Bhumibol Adulyadej Borommanatbophit and Her Majesty Queen Sirikit, the Queen Regent in the Ninth Reign, makes a royal visit (for the 4th time) to preside over the opening ceremony of the Bhumibol Dam on May 17, 1964.
- IATA: none; ICAO: VTPY

Summary
- Airport type: Defunct
- Operator: Electricity Generating Authority of Thailand
- Location: Sam Ngao district, Tak province, Thailand
- Elevation AMSL: 150 m (490 ft)
- Coordinates: 17°14′03.16″N 99°03′28.48″E

Map
- Location of the airport in Thailand

Runways
Direction	Length		Surface
Direction	m	ft	Surface
05/23	1,493	4,899	Asphalt

Bhumibol Dam Airport or Khuan Phumiphon Airport (Thai: สนามบินเขื่อนภูมิพล, RTGS: Sanambin Khuean Phumiphon) (ICAO: VTPY) is a defunct airfield located in Sam Ngao district, Tak province, Thailand. It was established in 1959 to support the construction of the Bhumibol Dam, and saw multiple royal visits as a result. After the dam was completed, it was utilised for rainmaking operations to raise the dam's water levels. In 1977, it was officially approved as a license airport, and continued to handle political visits into the 1980s.

== History ==
Prior to the development of an airport specialised for the construction of the Bhumibol Dam and operations of the Royal Irrigation Department, Tak Airport would be utilised for visiting delegations. In 1959, an airport was constructed at Sam Ngao, Amphoe Sam Ngao for transporting personal and light materials. The runway was capable of handling the Douglas DC-3. On 15 October 1959, it was officially designated as a temporary landing ground, named Bhumibol Dam Airport. On 24 June 1961, HM King Bhumibol Adulyadej the Great, along with HM Queen Sirikit departed from Don Mueang Airport and boarded the royal plane to Bhumibol Dam Airport. Afterwards they performed the groundbreaking ceremony and laid the foundation stone of the Bhumibol Dam. On 17 May 1964, King Bhumibol and Queen Sirikit returned to the airport for the official opening ceremony of the Bhumibol Dam.

During rainmaking operations aiming to raise dam water levels on 15-29 November 1972, Bhumibol Dam airport served as the base for the Ministry of Agriculture and Cooperatives' participating aircraft. In November 1973, Royal Rainmaking Unit 2 established the airport as its operating base. On 31 May 1977, Minister of Transport Lursakdi Sampatisiri officially revoked Bhumibol Dam Airport's old designation as a temporary landing ground, approving it as a licensed airport under Volume 94, Part 52 of the Royal Thai Government Gazette. General Prem Tinsulanonda, the then Prime Minister, arrived at Bhumibol Dam Airport on 23 September 1981 with a goal of bolstering morale. The minister met with local people, military personnel, and the Border Patrol Police in the north, and left on 13 October.

As of 2003, the airport currently serves the Bhumibol Dam and is operated by the Electricity Generating Authority of Thailand. By 2023, Bhumibol Dam Airport was listed as being closed for service, with plans to develop it as a flight-training centre.

== Layout ==
Bhumibol Dam Airport is served by a small air terminal equipped with a control tower. The airfield consists of a single asphalt runway designated as 05/23, with a length of 4,899 ft and also a width of 98 ft. Originally runway 05/23, did not have any obstructions, however vegetation growth have appeared over time. Accommodated with the runway is a 951 ft long apron currently used as helipads.

=== Equipment ===
As of 2010, Bhumibol Dam Airport uses aviation gasoline (AVGAS) for refueling purposes. For communications, the frequency of the airport is TWR 122.3 MHz (local control).

== Accidents & incidents ==
- On 12 March 2005, a private TR 28 light aircraft attempted to land at Bhumibol Dam Airport and crashed, killing all three occupants including pilot Apichai Rattanawanich, Assistant Managing Director and secretary of the Civil Aviation Association. Prior to the crash, it had departed from Lamphun Airport and notified the air traffic control tower. The tower accordingly prepared fire truck and rescue personnel. When the aircraft struck the ground, it was reported to have bounced in the air and lost stability, banking to the left and crashing into the scrubland beside the runway. Subsequently, the fuel tank exploded, leaving the aircraft to rest approximately 100 metres from the tower.

== Gallery ==
Historic photos of Bhumibol Dam Airport
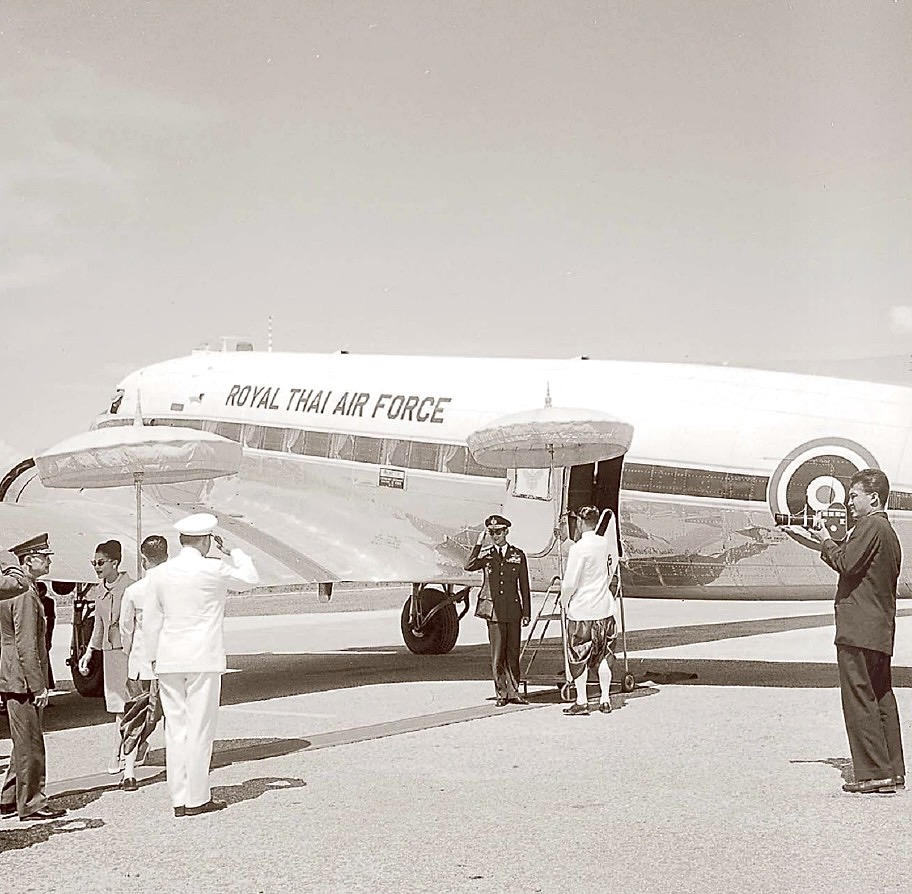

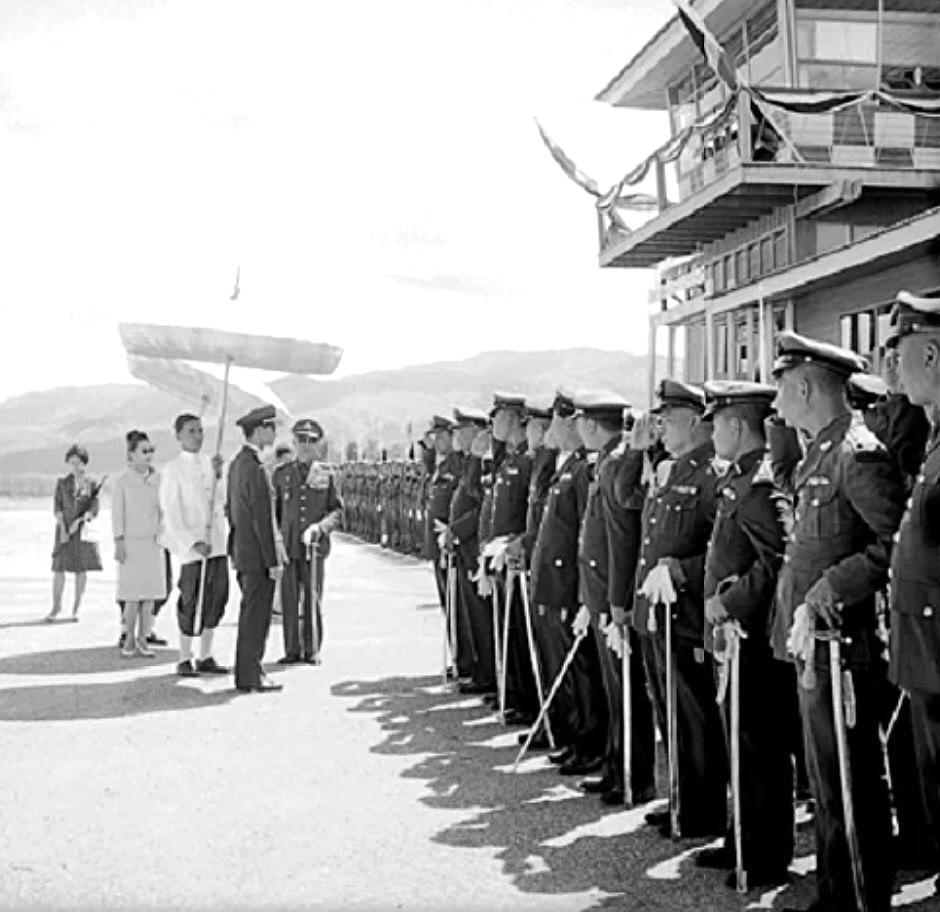
