= Mae Lan =

Mae Lan may refer to:

- Mae Lan District
- Mae Lan, Pattani
- Mae Lan, Lamphun
