= Nong Han =

Nong Han may refer to several places in Thailand:

- Nong Han Lake
- Nong Han Kumphawapi Lake
- Nong Han Luang
- Nong Han, San Sai, Chiang Mai Province
- Amphoe Nong Han, Udon Thani Province
