= Bhumibol Dam =

Dam in Sam Ngao, Tak, Thailand

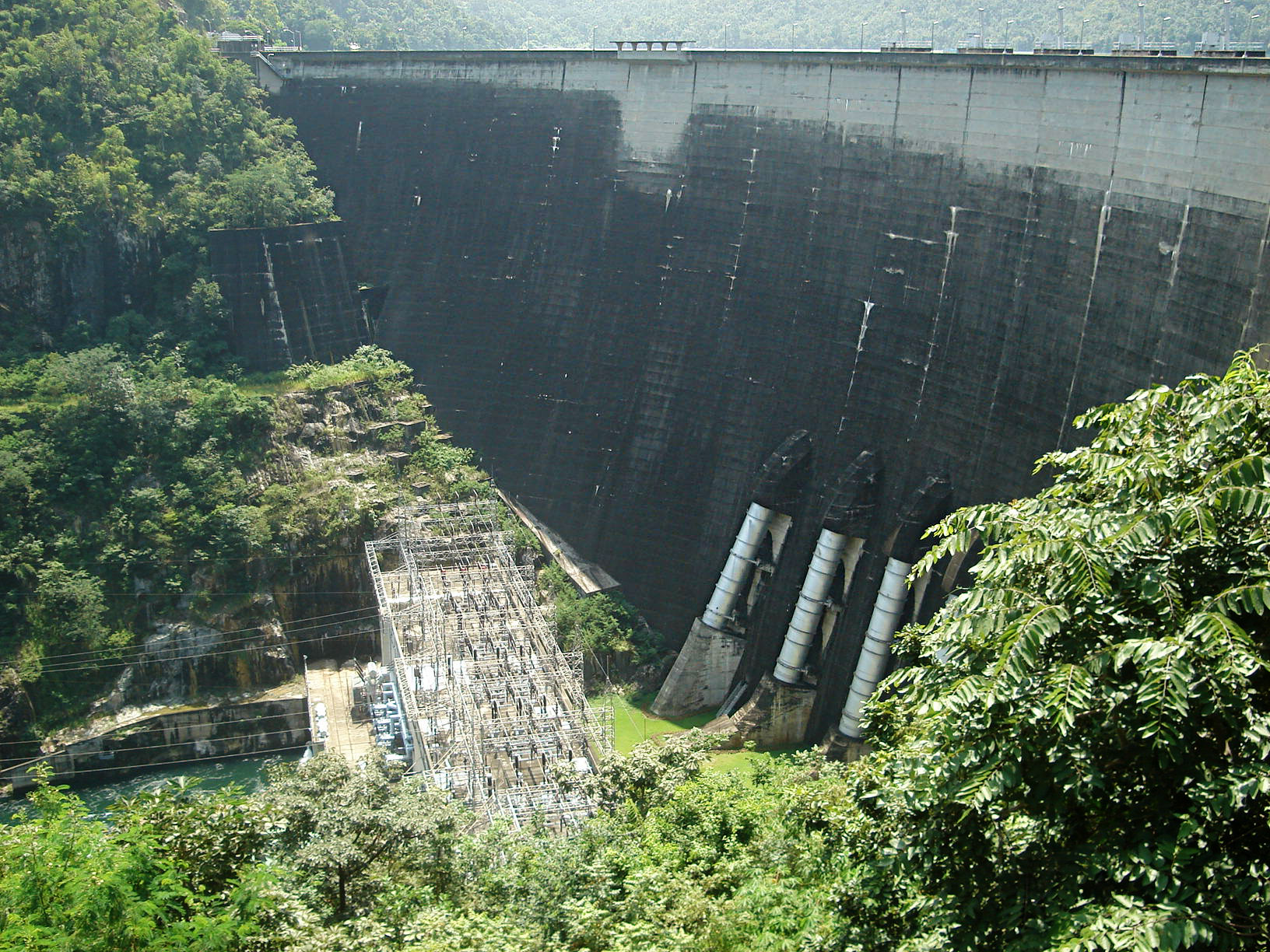

- Location within Thailand
- Country: Thailand
- Location: Sam Ngao, Tak
- Coordinates: 17°14′33″N 98°58′20″E
- Status: In use
- Construction began: 1958
- Opening date: 1964
- Owner: Electricity Generating Authority of Thailand

Dam and spillways
- Impounds: Ping River
- Height: 154 m (505 ft)
- Length: 486 m (1,594 ft)
- Width (crest): 8 m (26 ft)

Reservoir
- Creates: Bhumibol Reservoir
- Total capacity: 13,462,000,000 m^{3} (10,913,821 acre⋅ft)
- Active capacity: 9,762,000,000 m^{3} (7,914,182 acre⋅ft)
- Catchment area: 26,400 km^{2} (10,193 sq mi)
- Surface area: 300 km^{2} (116 sq mi)

Power Station
- Commission date: 1964–1996
- Turbines: 2 x 76.3 MW Francis-type, 1 x 115 MW Pelton-type, 1 x 175 MW Francis pump-turbine
- Installed capacity: 779.2 MW

The Bhumibol Dam (formerly known as the Yanhi Dam) is a concrete arch dam on the Ping River, a tributary of the Chao Phraya River, in Sam Ngao District of Tak Province, Thailand. It is about 480 km (298 mi) north of Bangkok and was built for the purposes of water storage, hydroelectric power production, flood control, fisheries and saltwater intrusion management. The dam was named after King Bhumibol Adulyadej and it was Thailand's first multi-purpose project. It is the highest dam in Thailand at 154 m (505 ft) tall.

== History ==
In the late 1940s to early 1950s, Thailand was struggling to recover from wartime damages and to develop its resources with international financial help. On 17 October 1950, the United States extended military assistance, and the International Bank granted its first loan to Thailand ten days later. Amounting up to USD $25,400,000, the loan was to fund irrigation, railway, and port development projects. In early 1952, a request was made for a secondary loan to fund the construction of hydroelectric projects.

In 1952, M.L. Xujati Kambhu requested the World Bank for financing construction, proposing a survey conducted by the Irrigation Department. Another proposal was submitted in early 1953 with an increased electricity production capacity and larger estimated costs. Following the second proposal, Thai officials requested assistance from the United States Bureau of Reclamation in the Department of the Interior. The agency agreed to send a survey team to the proposed sites, deciding whether they would agree that Thailand had needed such funding.

The dam was originally called Yanhee Dam in 1951 when the government of prime minister Field Marshal Plaek Pibulsongkram initiated the project. It was renamed Bhumibol Dam in 1957. The dam, among others in the Chao Phraya basin, was constructed beginning in the 1950s to exploit the agricultural and hydroelectric potential of the basin. Construction on the dam began in 1958 and was finished in 1964 at a cost of 3.5 billion baht. The reservoir was completely filled in 1970. The first two generators were commissioned in 1964. In 1972, the Sirikit Dam was completed on the Nan River, one of two major tributaries of the Chao Phraya including the Ping. The Bhumibol and Sirikit Dams control 22 percent of the Chao Phraya's annual runoff combined. Both dams also help provide for the irrigation of 1,200,000 ha (4,633 sq mi) in the wet season and 480,000 ha (1,853 sq mi) in the dry season.

In 1991, the Lower Mae Ping Dam (17°14′31″N 99°00′58″E) was constructed 5 km (3 mi) downstream to create a lower reservoir for the one pumped-storage turbine that was installed. When constructed, the Bhumibol Dam contributed 73.66 percent of Thailand's power generation and in 2003 that number was 2 percent.

During the 2011 Thailand floods, rainfall for March 2011 over the area of northern Thailand was an extraordinary 344 percent above normal. Bhumibol Dam in particular got 242.8 millimetres (9.56 in) of rain, 224.7 millimetres (8.85 in) above the mean of 25.2 millimetres (0.99 in) and since 1 January had accumulated 245.9 millimetres (9.68 in), 216 millimetres (8.5 in) or 186 percent above normal.

== Design ==
The dam is an arch-gravity type and is 154 m (505 ft) tall, 486 m (1,594 ft) long and 8 m (26 ft) wide at its crest. It withholds a reservoir of 13,462,000,000 m^{3} (10,913,821 acre⋅ft) of which 9,762,000,000 m^{3} (7,914,182 acre⋅ft) is active or "useful" storage. The dam's catchment area is 26,400 km^{2} (10,193 sq mi) while its surface area is 300 km^{2} (116 sq mi). The Lower Mae Ping Dam is 8 m (26 ft) high, 300 m (984 ft) long and has a storage capacity of 5,000,000 m^{3} (4,054 acre⋅ft). In off-peak hours, the one pump-turbine returns water back into the Bhumibol (upper) reservoir and when demand is high, the pump serves as a generator for power production.

== Power station ==
The power plant contains eight turbines for an installed capacity of 779.2 megawatts (1,044,900 hp). Six are 76.3 megawatts (102,300 hp) Francis-type, one is a 115 megawatts (154,000 hp) Pelton turbine and one is a 175 megawatts (235,000 hp) Francis pump-turbine.

The dam's power house underwent upgrades and renovations in the 1990s.

EGAT plans to add 205 MW of floating solar panels to the dams catchment area to turn the dam in to a hybrid power generation facility with a planned completion date of 2027.

== Climate ==
Climate data for Bhumibol Dam (1991–2020, extremes 1960-present)
Month	Jan	Feb	Mar	Apr	May	Jun	Jul	Aug	Sep	Oct	Nov	Dec	Year
Record high °C (°F)	37.9 (100.2)	40.8 (105.4)	42.3 (108.1)	43.7 (110.7)	43.0 (109.4)	39.5 (103.1)	39.0 (102.2)	38.5 (101.3)	38.0 (100.4)	36.7 (98.1)	37.4 (99.3)	35.7 (96.3)	43.7 (110.7)
Mean daily maximum °C (°F)	31.9 (89.4)	34.8 (94.6)	37.3 (99.1)	38.2 (100.8)	35.7 (96.3)	33.8 (92.8)	33.1 (91.6)	32.9 (91.2)	33.0 (91.4)	32.3 (90.1)	31.8 (89.2)	30.6 (87.1)	33.8 (92.8)
Daily mean °C (°F)	23.8 (74.8)	26.6 (79.9)	29.8 (85.6)	30.9 (87.6)	29.7 (85.5)	28.7 (83.7)	28.4 (83.1)	28.1 (82.6)	27.7 (81.9)	26.6 (79.9)	25.2 (77.4)	23.2 (73.8)	27.4 (81.3)
Mean daily minimum °C (°F)	17.8 (64.0)	19.6 (67.3)	23.1 (73.6)	25.2 (77.4)	25.2 (77.4)	25.0 (77.0)	24.7 (76.5)	24.5 (76.1)	23.9 (75.0)	22.7 (72.9)	20.6 (69.1)	17.9 (64.2)	22.5 (72.5)
Record low °C (°F)	7.0 (44.6)	9.6 (49.3)	12.1 (53.8)	18.0 (64.4)	20.5 (68.9)	20.0 (68.0)	20.4 (68.7)	20.6 (69.1)	20.1 (68.2)	15.8 (60.4)	10.7 (51.3)	6.3 (43.3)	6.3 (43.3)
Average precipitation mm (inches)	8.2 (0.32)	6.3 (0.25)	30.9 (1.22)	64.7 (2.55)	191.2 (7.53)	108.7 (4.28)	69.9 (2.75)	119.6 (4.71)	224.2 (8.83)	186.1 (7.33)	28.0 (1.10)	8.7 (0.34)	1,046.5 (41.20)
Average precipitation days (≥ 1.0 mm)	0.8	0.7	2.1	4.0	10.5	10.4	9.3	10.8	12.9	11.7	2.6	0.9	76.7
Average relative humidity (%)	69.7	58.5	54.1	59.5	70.6	74.0	73.5	75.4	79.7	83.2	79.4	75.4	71.1
Mean monthly sunshine hours	272.8	257.6	294.5	279.0	198.4	117.0	120.9	117.8	108.0	182.9	216.0	272.8	2,437.7
Source 1: NOAA
Source 2: Office of Water Management and Hydrology, Royal Irrigation Department (sun 1981–2010)(extremes)

== See also ==
- List of power stations in Thailand
- King Bhumibol Adulyadej

== Bibliography ==
- Ladd, Culver S. (2012). Thailand Transformed: 1950-2012. Modern History Press. ISBN 978-1-61599-204-1.
