= Mae Ramat district =

Mae Ramat แม่ระมาด
- District
- District location in Tak province
- Coordinates: 16°58′59″N 98°31′1″E
- Country: Thailand
- Province: Tak

Area
  - Total: 1,475.5 km^{2} (569.7 sq mi)

Population (2000)
  - Total: 44,798
  - Density: 30.4/km^{2} (79/sq mi)
- Time zone: UTC+7 (ICT)
- Postal code: 63140
- Geocode: 6304

Mae Ramat (Thai: แม่ระมาด, pronounced [mɛ̂ː rā.mâːt]) is a district (amphoe) in the northwestern part of Tak province, western Thailand.

== History ==
The area of Mae Ramat was occupied by Karen people for 100 years. Many people from northern provinces of Thailand moved to establish a new village there. Later the village grew bigger and became the Tambon Mae Ramat. The government upgraded the tambon to a minor district (king amphoe) in 1897. It was upgraded to a full district in 1951.

== Geography ==
Neighboring districts are (from the northwest clockwise) Tha Song Yang of Tak Province, Omkoi of Chiang Mai province, Sam Ngao, Ban Tak, Mueang Tak and Mae Sot of Tak Province, and Kayin State of Myanmar.

Khun Phra Wo National Park (อุทยานแห่งชาติขุนพระวอ) is in Mae Ramat District.

The important river of the district is the Mae Ramat River.

== Economy ==
The district is the site of the Ler Tor Royal Project. Ler Tor village is in a mountainous area at 500 metres to 1,200 m elevation. In the area there are more than 5,610 Pgakauyau or Karen people in six villages and 14 communities. Before the royal project introduced villagers to other cash crops, the villagers grew opium poppies.

== Administration ==
The district is divided into six sub-districts (tambons), which are further subdivided into 57 villages (mubans). There are two townships (thesaban tambon) in the district, Mae Ramat and Mae Chao Rao, each covering parts of the same-named tambon. There are a further six tambon administrative organizations (TAO).

1.	Mae Ramat	แม่ระมาด
2.	Mae Charao	แม่จะเรา
3.	Khane Chue	ขะเนจื้อ
4.	Mae Tuen	แม่ตื่น
5.	Sam Muen	สามหมื่น
6.	Phra That	พระธาตุ
