= Sam Ngao district =

Sam Ngao สามเงา
- District
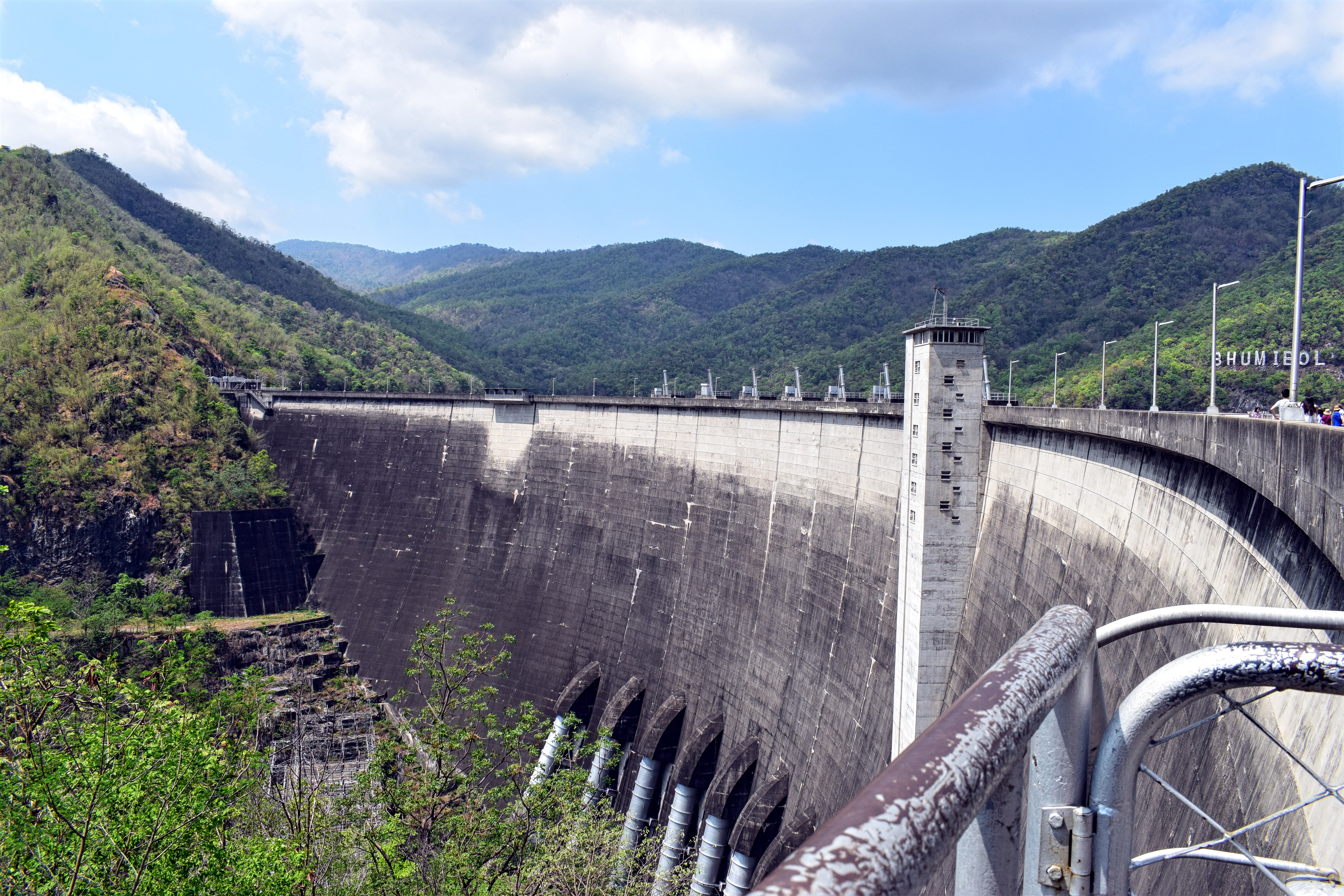
- Bhumibol Dam

- District location in Tak province
- Coordinates: 17°14′36″N 99°1′21″E
- Country: Thailand
- Province: Tak
- Seat: Sam Ngao

Area
  - Total: 2,771.927 km^{2} (1,070.247 sq mi)

Population (2007)
  - Total: 32,483
  - Density: 11.7/km^{2} (30/sq mi)
- Time zone: UTC+7 (ICT)
- Postal code: 63130
- Geocode: 6303

Sam Ngao (Thai: สามเงา, pronounced [sǎːm ŋāw]) with Tha Song Yang district is the northernmost district (amphoe) of Tak province, western Thailand.

== History ==
The minor district (king amphoe) was established in 1930 as a subordinate of Ban Tak district. Originally named Tha Pui (ท่าปุย), it was renamed "Sam Ngao" in 1939. It was upgraded to a full district in 1958.

== Geography ==
Neighboring districts are (south from clockwise): Ban Tak, Mae Ramat of Tak Province, Omkoi, Doi Tao of Chiang Mai province, Thung Hua Chang of Lamphun province, Mae Phrik and Thoen of Lampang province.

The southwest end of the Phi Pan Nam Range reaches the eastern end of the district. The important water resources of the district are the Ping and Wang Rivers. The Bhumibol Dam is an artificial lake of the Ping River for flood control and for generating electricity.

Situated north-east of central Sam Ngao is Bhumibol Dam Airport (also known as Phumiphon Airport) operated by the Electricity Generating Authority of Thailand.

== Administration ==
The district is divided into six sub-districts (tambons), which are further subdivided into 43 villages (mubans). Sam Ngao is a sub-district municipality (thesaban tambon) which covers parts of the tambon Sam Ngao. There are a further six tambon administrative organizations (TAO).

| No. | Name | Thai | Pop. |
|---|---|---|---|
| 1. | Sam Ngao | สามเงา | 9,241 |
| 2. | Wang Man | วังหมัน | 4,522 |
| 3. | Yokkrabat | ยกกระบัตร | 8,200 |
| 4. | Yan Ri | ย่านรี | 3,294 |
| 5. | Ban Na | บ้านนา | 2,161 |
| 6. | Wang Chan | วังจันทร์ | 5,065 |
