= Mae Phrik district =

Mae Phrik แม่พริก
- District
- District location in Lampang province
- Coordinates: 17°26′54″N 99°6′54″E
- Country: Thailand
- Province: Lampang
- Seat: Mae Phrik

Area
  - Total: 538.921 km^{2} (208.079 sq mi)

Population (2008)
  - Total: 17,149
  - Density: 31.8/km^{2} (82/sq mi)
- Time zone: UTC+7 (ICT)
- Postal code: 52180
- Geocode: 5209

Mae Phrik (Thai: แม่พริก, pronounced [mɛ̂ː pʰrík]) is a district (amphoe) in the southern part of Lampang province, northern Thailand.

== Geography ==
Neighboring districts are (from the northeast clockwise): Thoen of Lampang Province, Sam Ngao of Tak province and Li of Lamphun province.

== History ==
Mae Phrik was created in 1904 as a minor district (king amphoe) in Thoen District. It was upgraded to a full district in 1958.

== Administration ==
The district is divided into four subdistricts (tambons), which are further subdivided into 29 villages (mubans). There are two subdistrict municipalities (thesaban tambons): Mae Phrik covers parts of tambons Mae Phrik and tambon Mae Pu. There are a further two tambon administrative organizations (TAO).

No.	Name	Thai	Villages	Pop.
1.	Mae Phrik	แม่พริก	10	7,045
2.	Pha Pang	ผาปัง	5	1,903
3.	Mae Pu	แม่ปุ	6	4,316
4.	Phra Bat Wang Tuang	พระบาทวังตวง	8	3,885

== Economy ==
Tambon Pha Pang's population declined from 1,700 persons in 2004 to roughly 900 persons, half of them elderly, in 2019. To combat economic deterioration, the Foundation for Phapang Community Development was founded in 2014. It has undertaken a number of revitalization projects in the area.
