= Nong Chom =

Coordinates: 18.848708°N 99.022502°E

Nong Chom หนองจ๊อม
- Tambon
- Interactive map of Nong Chom
- Country: Thailand
- Province: Chiang Mai
- District: San Sai

Population (2005)
  - Total: 13,657
- Time zone: UTC+7 (ICT)

Nong Chom (Thai: หนองจ๊อม) is a tambon (subdistrict) of San Sai District, in Chiang Mai Province, Thailand. In 2005 it had a population of 13,657 people. The tambon contains nine villages.
