= Nong Yaeng =

Nong Yaeng หนองแหย่ง
- Tambon
- Country: Thailand
- Province: Chiang Mai
- District: San Sai

Population (2005)
  - Total: 5,117
- Time zone: UTC+7 (ICT)

Nong Yaeng (Thai: หนองแหย่ง) is a tambon (subdistrict) of San Sai District, in Chiang Mai Province, Thailand. In 2005 it had a population of 5,117 people. The tambon contains 11 villages.
