= Dong Dam =

Dong Dam ดงดำ
- Subdistrict
- Interactive map of Dong Dam
- Country: Thailand
- Province: Lamphun
- District: Li District

Population (2005)
  - Total: 3,128
- Time zone: UTC+7 (ICT)

Dong Dam (Thai: ดงดำ, pronounced [dōŋ dām]) is a village and tambon (subdistrict) of Li District, in Lamphun Province, Thailand. In 2005, it had a population of 3,128 people. The tambon contains six villages.
