= Mae Tuen, Lamphun =

Mae Tuen แม่ตืน
- Subdistrict
- Interactive map of Mae Tuen
- Coordinates: 18.010039°N 98.880894°E
- Country: Thailand
- Province: Lamphun
- District: Li District

Population (2005)
  - Total: 11,617
- Time zone: UTC+7 (ICT)

Mae Tuen (Thai: แม่ตืน, pronounced [mɛ̂ː tɯ̄ːn]) is a village and tambon (subdistrict) of Li District, in Lamphun Province, Thailand. In 2005 it had a population of 11,617 people. The tambon contains 17 villages.
