= San Sai district =

San Sai สันทราย
- District
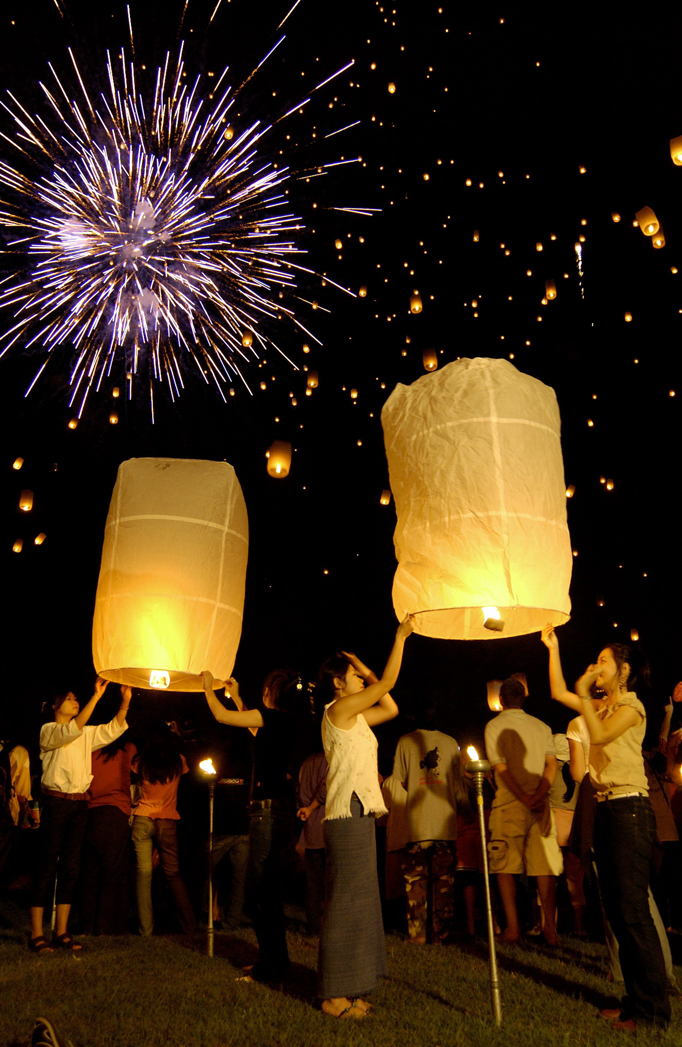
- Yi Peng festival at San Sai, Chiang Mai Province

- District location in Chiang Mai province
- Coordinates: 18°50′55″N 99°2′42″E
- Country: Thailand
- Province: Chiang Mai

Area
  - Total: 285.02 km^{2} (110.05 sq mi)

Population (2005)
  - Total: 105,771
  - Density: 371.1/km^{2} (961/sq mi)
- Time zone: UTC+7 (ICT)
- Postal code: 50210
- Geocode: 5014

San Sai (Thai: สันทราย) is a district (amphoe) in the central part of Chiang Mai province in northern Thailand.

== History ==
During the annual rainy season (monsoons), the Ping and the Khao River carry sediment that accumulates at the confluence of the two rivers, forming large dunes. This area is now the site of the San Sai District office. When the Siamese government of created this district on 20 October 1897, they named it San Sai. San is the Thai word for 'dune', and sai means 'sand'.

== Geography ==
Neighboring districts are (from the north clockwise) Mae Taeng, Doi Saket, San Kamphaeng, Mueang Chiang Mai and Mae Rim and of Chiang Mai Province.

== Administration ==
The district is divided into 12 sub-districts (tambons), which are further subdivided into 116 villages (mubans). There are two townships (thesaban tambons): San Sai Luang covers parts of tambons San Sai Luang, San Sai Noi, San Phranet, and Pa Phai; Mae Cho parts of tambons Nong Chom, Nong Han, and Pa Phai. There are a further 10 tambon administrative organizations (TAO).

No.	Name	Thai name	Villages	Pop.
1.	San Sai Luang	สันทรายหลวง	8	6,397
2.	San Sai Noi	สันทรายน้อย	7	13,950
3.	San Phranet	สันพระเนตร	7	5,965
4.	San Na Meng	สันนาเม็ง	10	8,100
5.	San Pa Pao	สันป่าเปา	6	3,934
6.	Nong Yaeng	หนองแหย่ง	11	5,117
7.	Nong Chom	หนองจ๊อม	9	13,657
8.	Nong Han	หนองหาร	13	16,463
9.	Mae Faek	แม่แฝก	12	9,619
10.	Mae Faek Mai	แม่แฝกใหม่	12	7,575
11.	Mueang Len	เมืองเล็น	5	2,535
12.	Pa Phai	ป่าไผ่	16	12,459
