= San Sai Luang =

Coordinates: 18°51′N 99°03′E

San Sai Luang สันทรายหลวง
- Tambon
- Interactive map of San Sai Luang
- Country: Thailand
- Province: Chiang Mai
- District: San Sai

Population (2005)
  - Total: 6,397
- Time zone: UTC+7 (ICT)

San Sai Luang (Thai: สันทรายหลวง) is a tambon (subdistrict) of San Sai District, in Chiang Mai Province, Thailand. In 2005 it had a population of 6,397 people. The tambon contains eight villages.
