= Mueang Len =

Coordinates: 18.8662°N 99.0677°E

Mueang Len เมืองเล็น
- Tambon
- Interactive map of Mueang Len
- Country: Thailand
- Province: Chiang Mai
- District: San Sai

Population (2005)
  - Total: 2,535
- Time zone: UTC+7 (ICT)

Mueang Len (Thai: เมืองเล็น) is a tambon (subdistrict) of San Sai District, in Chiang Mai Province, Thailand. In 2005, it had a population of 2,535 people. The tambon contains five villages.
