= Thung Hua Chang subdistrict =

Coordinates: 18°00′N 99°02′E

Thung Hua Chang ทุ่งหัวช้าง
- Subdistrict
- Interactive map of Thung Hua Chang
- Country: Thailand
- Province: Lamphun
- District: Thung Hua Chang District

Population (2005)
  - Total: 8,294
- Time zone: UTC+7 (ICT)

Thung Hua Chang (Thai: ทุ่งหัวช้าง, pronounced [tʰûŋ hǔa̯ t͡ɕʰáːŋ]) is a village and tambon (subdistrict) of Thung Hua Chang District, in Lamphun Province, Thailand. In 2005 it had a population of 8294 people. The tambon contains 12 villages.
