= San Pa Pao =

Coordinates: 18.8591°N 99.0865°E

San Pa Pao สันป่าเปา
- Tambon
- Interactive map of San Pa Pao
- Country: Thailand
- Province: Chiang Mai
- District: San Sai

Population (2005)
  - Total: 3,934
- Time zone: UTC+7 (ICT)

San Pa Pao (Thai: สันป่าเปา) is a tambon (subdistrict) of San Sai District, in Chiang Mai Province, Thailand. In 2005 it had a population of 3,934 people. The tambon contains six villages.
