= San Na Meng =

San Na Meng สันนาเม็ง
- Tambon
- Location within Thailand
- Coordinates: 19°6′N 99°4′E
- Country: Thailand
- Province: Chiang Mai
- District: San Sai

Population (2005)
  - Total: 8,100
- Time zone: UTC+7 (ICT)

San Na Meng (Thai: สันนาเม็ง) is a tambon (subdistrict) of San Sai District, in Chiang Mai Province, Thailand. In 2005 it had a population of 8,100 people. The tambon contains 10 villages.
