= Takhian Pom =

Coordinates: 18.0910°N 99.0114°E

Takhian Pom ตะเคียนปม
- Subdistrict
- Interactive map of Takhian Pom
- Country: Thailand
- Province: Lamphun
- District: Thung Hua Chang District

Population (2005)
  - Total: 6,855
- Time zone: UTC+7 (ICT)

Takhian Pom (Thai: ตะเคียนปม, pronounced [tā.kʰīa̯n pōm]) is a village and tambon (subdistrict) of Thung Hua Chang District, in Lamphun Province, Thailand. In 2005 it had a population of 6855 people. The tambon contains 12 villages.
