= Na Sai =

Coordinates: 17°44′00″N 98°57′05″E

Na Sai นาทราย
- Tambon
- Interactive map of Na Sai
- Country: Thailand
- Province: Lamphun
- Amphoe: Li District

Population (2005)
  - Total: 16,645
- Time zone: UTC+7 (ICT)

Na Sai (Thai: นาทราย, pronounced [nāː sāːj]) is a village and tambon (subdistrict) of Li District, in Lamphun Province, Thailand. In 2005 it had a population of 16,645 people. The tambon contains 23 villages.
