= Li subdistrict =

Coordinates: 17°48′N 98°57′E

Li, Lamphun
- Subdistrict
- Interactive map of Li, Lamphun
- Country: Thailand
- Province: Lamphun
- District: Li District

Population (2005)
  - Total: 13,463
- Time zone: UTC+7 (ICT)

Li (Thai: ลี้, pronounced [líː]) is a village and tambon (subdistrict) of Li District, in Lamphun Province, Thailand. In 2005 it had a population of 13,463 persons. The tambon contains 17 villages.
