= Ban Tak district =

Ban Tak บ้านตาก
- District
- District location in Tak province
- Coordinates: 17°2′36″N 99°4′44″E
- Country: Thailand
- Province: Tak

Area
  - Total: 992.495 km^{2} (383.204 sq mi)

Population (2005)
  - Total: 46,492
  - Density: 46.8/km^{2} (121/sq mi)
- Time zone: UTC+7 (ICT)
- Postal code: 63120
- Geocode: 6302

Ban Tak (Thai: บ้านตาก, pronounced [bâːn tàːk]) is a district (amphoe) in the northern part of Tak province, western Thailand.

== History ==
The area of Ban Tak is the old location of Mueang Tak. It was an ancient frontier city, on the west bank of the Ping River in Ban Tha Phra That, Tambon Ko Taphao. King Maha Thammaracha of Ayutthaya moved the center of Mueang Tak to its present site in Tambon Pa Mamuang at the end of the 16th century.

The current district office of Ban Tak is at Ban Tak Ok, Tambon Tak Ok, on the west side of Phahonyothin Highway.

== Geography ==
Neighboring districts are (south from clockwise): Mueang Tak, Mae Ramat, Sam Ngao of Tak Province, Thoen of Lampang province and Ban Dan Lan Hoi of Sukhothai province.

The southwest end of the Phi Pan Nam Range reaches the eastern end of the district.

The important water resources of the district are the Ping and Wang rivers.

The Bantak Petrified Forest Park is in this district.

== Administration ==
The district is divided into seven sub-districts (tambons), which are further subdivided into 67 villages (mubans). There are two townships (thesaban tambon): Ban Tak and Thung Kra Cho. Ban Tak covers parts of tambon Tak Ok and Tak Tok, and Thung Kracho, the whole tambon Thung Kracho, and parts of Thong Fa.

| No. | Name | Thai name | Villages | Pop. |
| 1. | Tak Ok | ตากออก | 12 | 10,443 |
| 2. | Samo Khon | สมอโคน | 9 | 4,347 |
| 3. | Mae Salit | แม่สลิด | 12 | 7,987 |
| 4. | Tak Tok | ตากตก | 10 | 5,811 |
| 5. | Ko Taphao | เกาะตะเภา | 8 | 6,667 |
| 6. | Thung Kracho | ทุ่งกระเชาะ | 9 | 5,771 |
| 7. | Thong Fa | ท้องฟ้า | 7 | 5,466 |
