= Ban Puang =

Coordinates: 17°52′N 99°04′E

Ban Puang บ้านปวง
- Subdistrict
- Interactive map of Ban Puang
- Country: Thailand
- Province: Lamphun
- District: Thung Hua Chang District

Population (2005)
  - Total: 3,918
- Time zone: UTC+7 (ICT)

Ban Puang (Thai: บ้านปวง, pronounced [bâːn pūa̯ŋ]) is a village and tambon (subdistrict) of Thung Hua Chang District, in Lamphun Province, Thailand. In 2005, it had a population of 3,918 people. The tambon contains 11 villages.
