= Mae Faek Mai =

Mae Faek Mai แม่แฝกใหม่
- Tambon
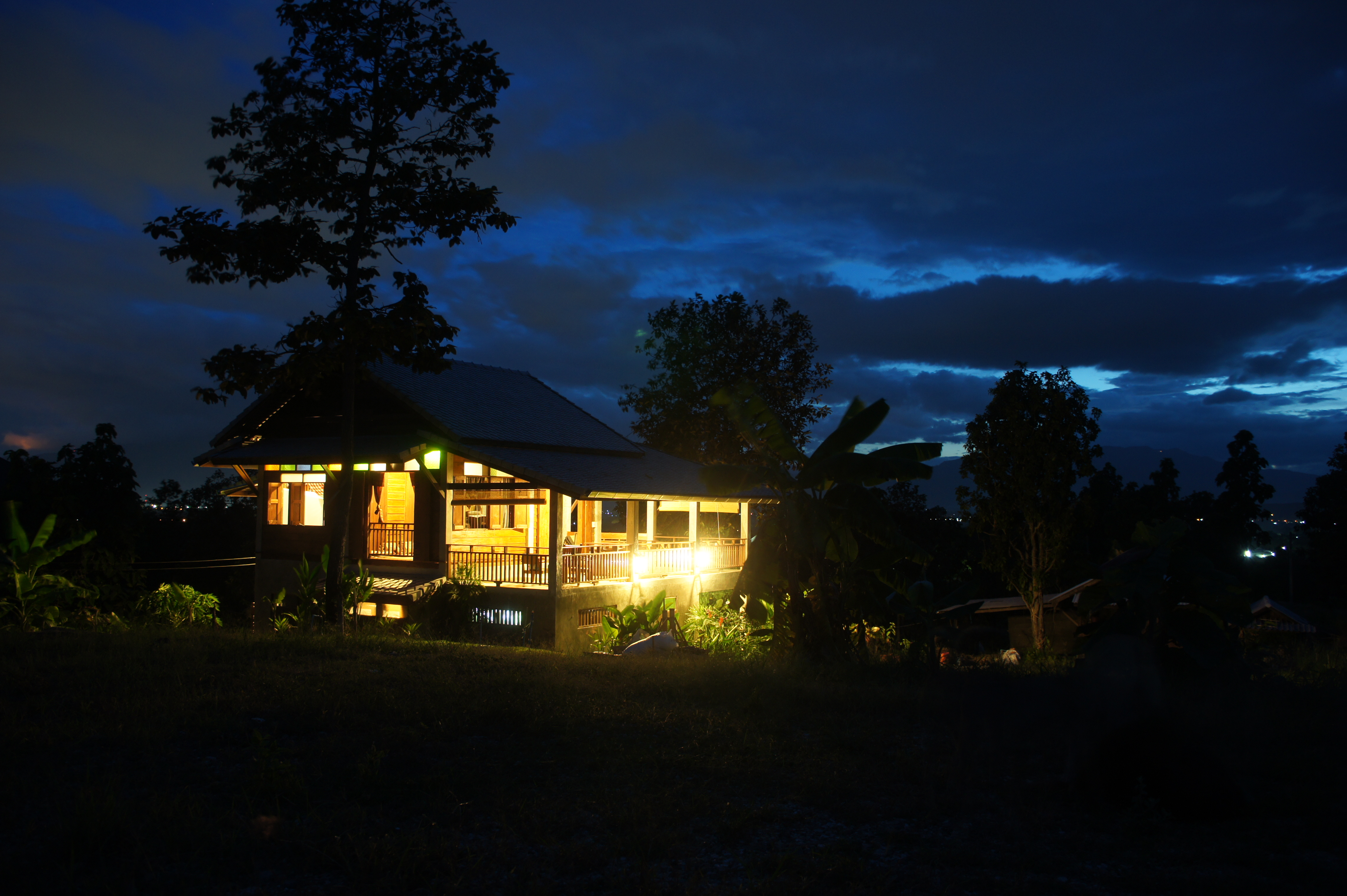
- Country: Thailand
- Province: Chiang Mai
- District: San Sai

Population (2005)
  - Total: 7,575
- Time zone: UTC+7 (ICT)

Mae Faek Mai (Thai: แม่แฝกใหม่) is a tambon (subdistrict) of San Sai District, in Chiang Mai Province, Thailand. In 2005 it had a population of 7,575 people. The tambon contains 12 villages.
