= San Phranet =

San Phranet สันพระเนตร
- Tambon
- Country: Thailand
- Province: Chiang Mai
- District: San Sai

Population (2005)
  - Total: 5,965
- Time zone: UTC+7 (ICT)

San Phranet (Thai: สันพระเนตร) is a tambon (subdistrict) of San Sai District, in Chiang Mai Province, Thailand. In 2005 it had a population of 5,965 people. The tambon contains seven villages.
