= Pa Phai, Lamphun =

Pa Phai
- Subdistrict
- Interactive map of Pa Phai
- Country: Thailand
- Province: Lamphun
- District: Li District

Population (2005)
  - Total: 9,734
- Time zone: UTC+7 (ICT)

Pa Phai (Thai: ป่าไผ่, pronounced [pàː pʰàj]) is a village and tambon (subdistrict) of Li District, in Lamphun Province, Thailand. In 2005 it had a population of 9734 people. The tambon contains 14 villages.
