= Thung Hua Chang district =

Thung Hua Chang ทุ่งหัวช้าง
- District
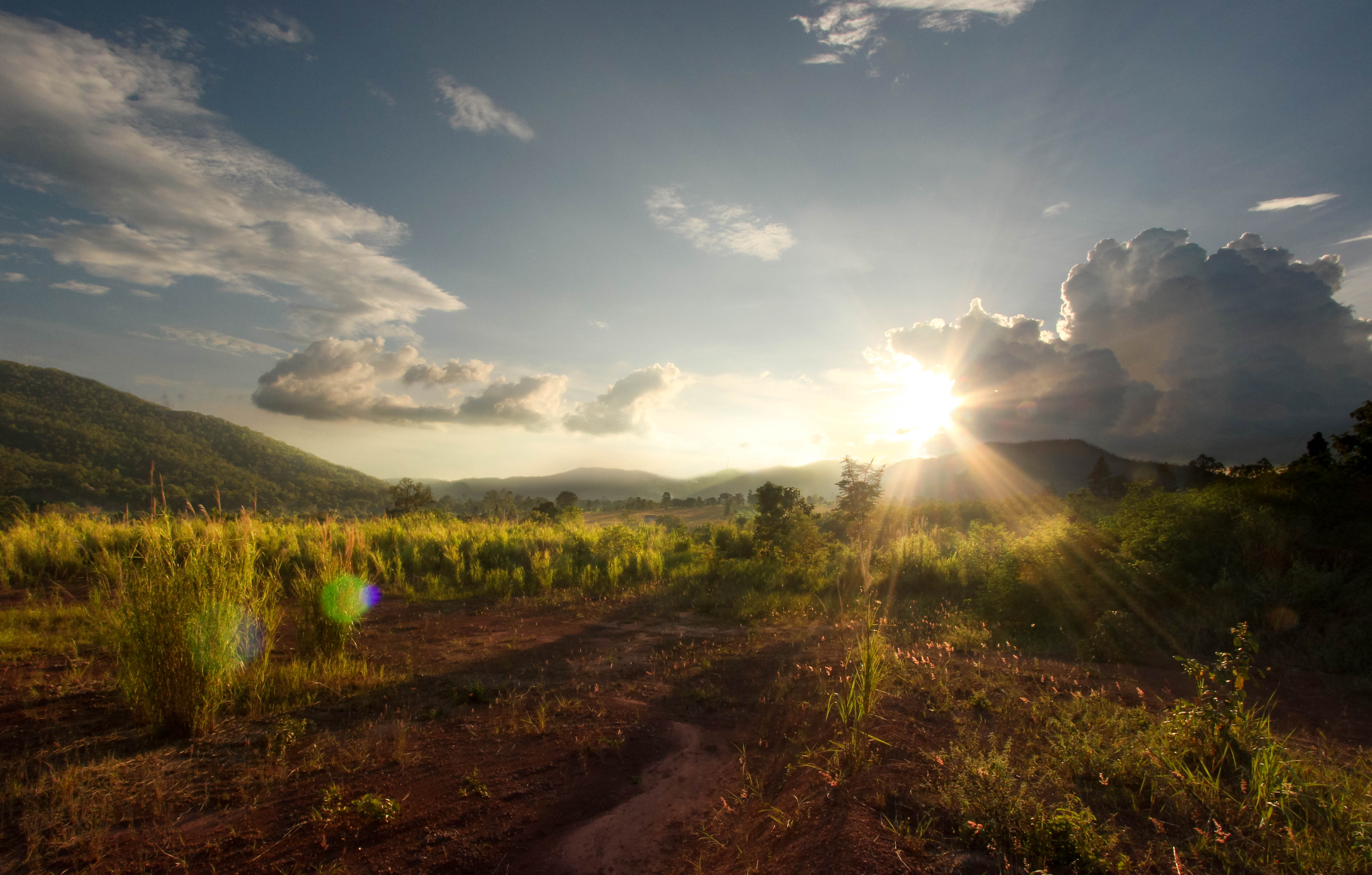
- Landscape of the district

- District location in Lamphun province
- Coordinates: 18°0′11″N 99°1′40″E
- Country: Thailand
- Province: Lamphun
- Seat: Thung Hua Chang

Area
  - Total: 486.1 km^{2} (187.7 sq mi)

Population (2005)
  - Total: 19,067
  - Density: 39.2/km^{2} (102/sq mi)
- Time zone: UTC+7 (ICT)
- Postal code: 51160
- Geocode: 5105

Thung Hua Chang (Thai: ทุ่งหัวช้าง, pronounced [tʰûŋ hǔa tɕʰáːŋ]; Northern Thai: ᨴ᩵ᩩᨦᩉ᩠᩶ᩅ᩠ᨿᨩ᩶ᩣ᩠ᨦ, pronounced [tôːŋ hǔa tɕáːŋ]) is a district (amphoe) of Lamphun province, northern Thailand.

== History ==
The minor district (king amphoe) Thung Hua Chang was created on 1 February 1987, when three tambons were split off from Li district. It was upgraded to a full district on 4 November 1993.

== Geography ==
Neighboring districts are (from the west clockwise): Li, Ban Hong, and Mae Tha of Lamphun Province; Soem Ngam and Thoen of Lampang province.

The Khun Tan Range stretches from north to south along the district.

== Administration ==
The district is divided into three sub-districts (tambons), which are further subdivided into 35 villages (mubans). Thung Hua Chang is a township (thesaban tambon) which covers parts of the same-named tambon. There are a further three tambon administrative organizations (TAO).

No.	Name	Thai name	Villages	Pop.
1.	Thung Hua Chang	ทุ่งหัวช้าง	12	8,294
2.	Ban Puang	บ้านปวง	11	3,918
3.	Takhian Pom	ตะเคียนปม	12	6,855
