= Mae Lan, Lamphun =

Mae Lan, Lamphun แม่ลาน
- Subdistrict
- Interactive map of Mae Lan, Lamphun
- Country: Thailand
- Province: Lamphun
- District: Li District

Population (2005)
  - Total: 3,017
- Time zone: UTC+7 (ICT)

Mae Lan (Thai: แม่ลาน, pronounced [mɛ̂ː lāːn]) is a village and tambon (subdistrict) of Li District, in Lamphun Province, Thailand. In 2005 it had a population of 3017 people. The tambon contains seven villages.
