= Thoen district =

Thoen เถิน
- District
- District location in Lampang province
- Coordinates: 17°36′42″N 99°12′57″E
- Country: Thailand
- Province: Lampang
- Seat: Lom Rat

Area
  - Total: 1,634.8 km^{2} (631.2 sq mi)

Population (2008)
  - Total: 61,694
  - Density: 38.4/km^{2} (99/sq mi)
- Time zone: UTC+7 (ICT)
- Postal code: 52160
- Geocode: 5208

Thoen (Thai: เถิน, pronounced [tʰɤ̌n]) is a district (amphoe) in the southern part of Lampang province, northern Thailand.

== Geography ==
Neighboring districts are (from the north clockwise): Soem Ngam, Sop Prap of Lampang Province, Wang Chin of Phrae province, Si Satchanalai, Thung Saliam, Ban Dan Lan Hoi of Sukhothai province, Ban Tak, Sam Ngao of Tak province, Mae Phrik of Lampang Province again, Li and Thung Hua Chang of Lamphun province.

Mae Wa National Park is in the western part of the district at the southern end of the Khun Tan Range. The Phi Pan Nam Mountains dominate the landscape of the eastern side of the district.

== History ==
The high ground along the district's boundary with Ban Dan Lan Hoi in Sukhothai province carries tin, lead and iron ore, and is continuous with the ranges of Tak province to the south-west. One of the metal-working sites recorded in that ground, Den Pang Hang, lies in the district. Iron tools were found in graves there, buried with the dead, and match those made at the smelting sites of the Mae Lamphan basin.

In 1938 the district was renamed from Mueang Thoen (เมืองเถิน) to Thoen, as only the capital districts were supposed to have the term Mueang in their name.

== Administration ==
The district is divided into eight subdistricts (tambons), which are further subdivided into 90 villages (mubans). Wiang Mok and Lom Rat are the two subdistrict municipalities (thesaban tambons), each covering parts of the same-named tambon. There are a further six tambon administrative organizations (TAO).

No.	Name	Thai	Villages	Pop.
1.	Lom Raet	ล้อมแรด	14	16,100
2.	Mae Wa	แม่วะ	7	5,945
3.	Mae Pa	แม่ปะ	10	4,615
4.	Mae Mok	แม่มอก	10	5,263
5.	Wiang Mok	เวียงมอก	11	10,269
6.	Na Pong	นาโป่ง	12	5,812
7.	Mae Thot	แม่ถอด	12	6,735
8.	Thoen Buri	เถินบุรี	14	6,955
