= Nong Han, Chiang Mai =

Coordinates: 18°54′N 99°00′E

Nong Ha หนองหาร
- Tambon
- Interactive map of Nong Ha
- Country: Thailand
- Province: Chiang Mai
- District: San Sai

Population (2005)
  - Total: 16,463
- Time zone: UTC+7 (ICT)

Nong Han (Thai: หนองหาร) is a tambon (subdistrict) of San Sai District, in Chiang Mai Province, Thailand. In 2005 it had a population of 16,463 people. The tambon contains 13 villages.
