= Pa Phai, Chiang Mai =

Pa Phai ป่าไผ่
- Tambon
- Country: Thailand
- Province: Chiang Mai
- District: San Sai

Population (2005)
  - Total: 12,459
- Time zone: UTC+7 (ICT)

Pa Phai (Thai: ป่าไผ่) is a tambon (subdistrict) of San Sai District, in Chiang Mai Province, Thailand. In 2005 it had a population of 12,459 people. The tambon contains 16 villages.
