= Si Wichai, Lamphun =

Si Wichai ศรีวิชัย
- Subdistrict
- Location within Thailand
- Country: Thailand
- Province: Lamphun
- District: Li District

Population (2005)
  - Total: 7,869
- Time zone: UTC+7 (ICT)

Si Wichai (Thai: ศรีวิชัย, pronounced [sǐː wí.t͡ɕʰāj]) is a village and tambon (subdistrict) of Li District, in Lamphun Province, Thailand. In 2005 it had a population of 7869 people. The tambon contains 13 villages.
