= Northern Thailand =

Geographical region of Thailand

Coordinates: 19°N 99°E

Northern Region ภาคเหนือ
- Region
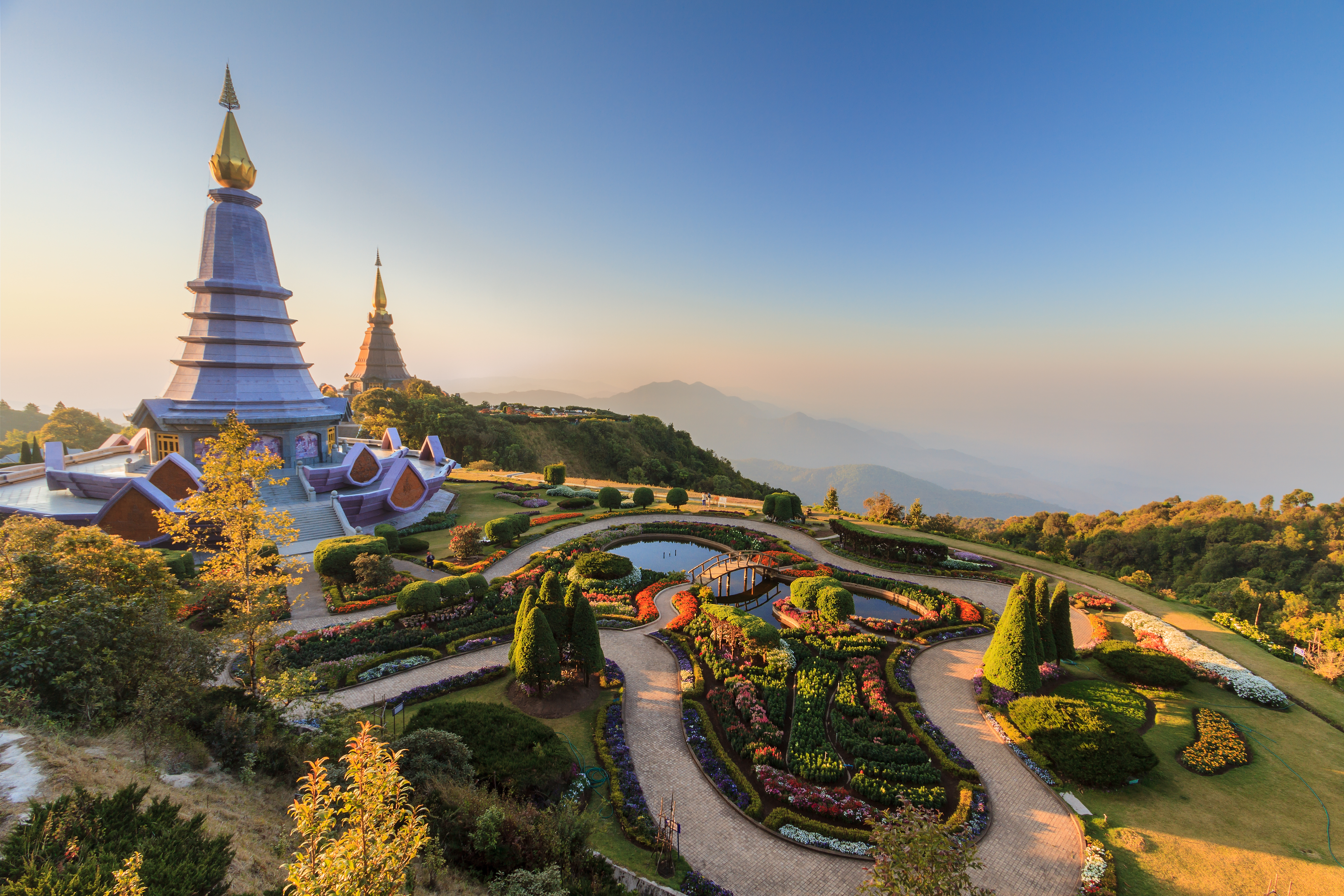
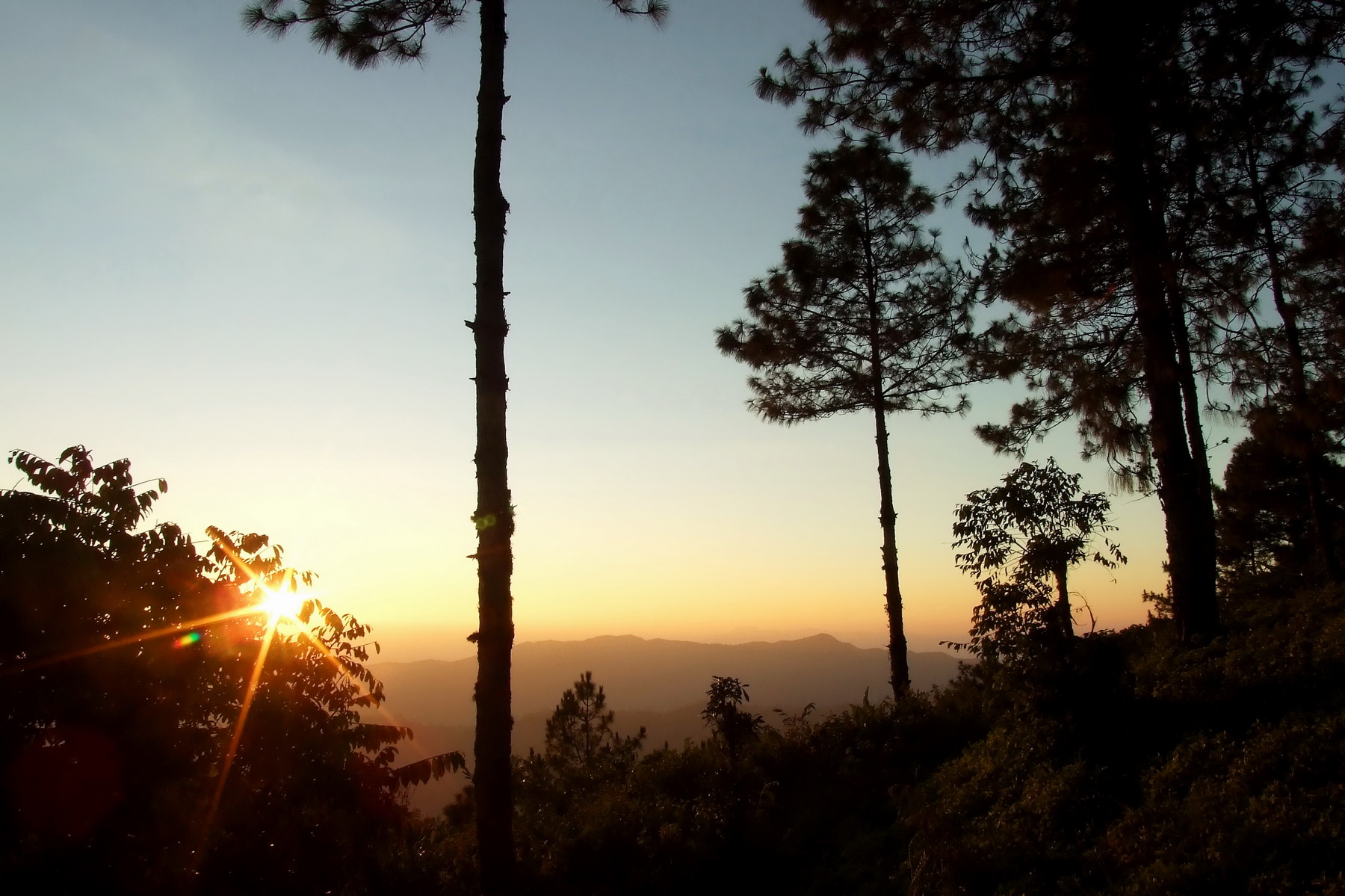
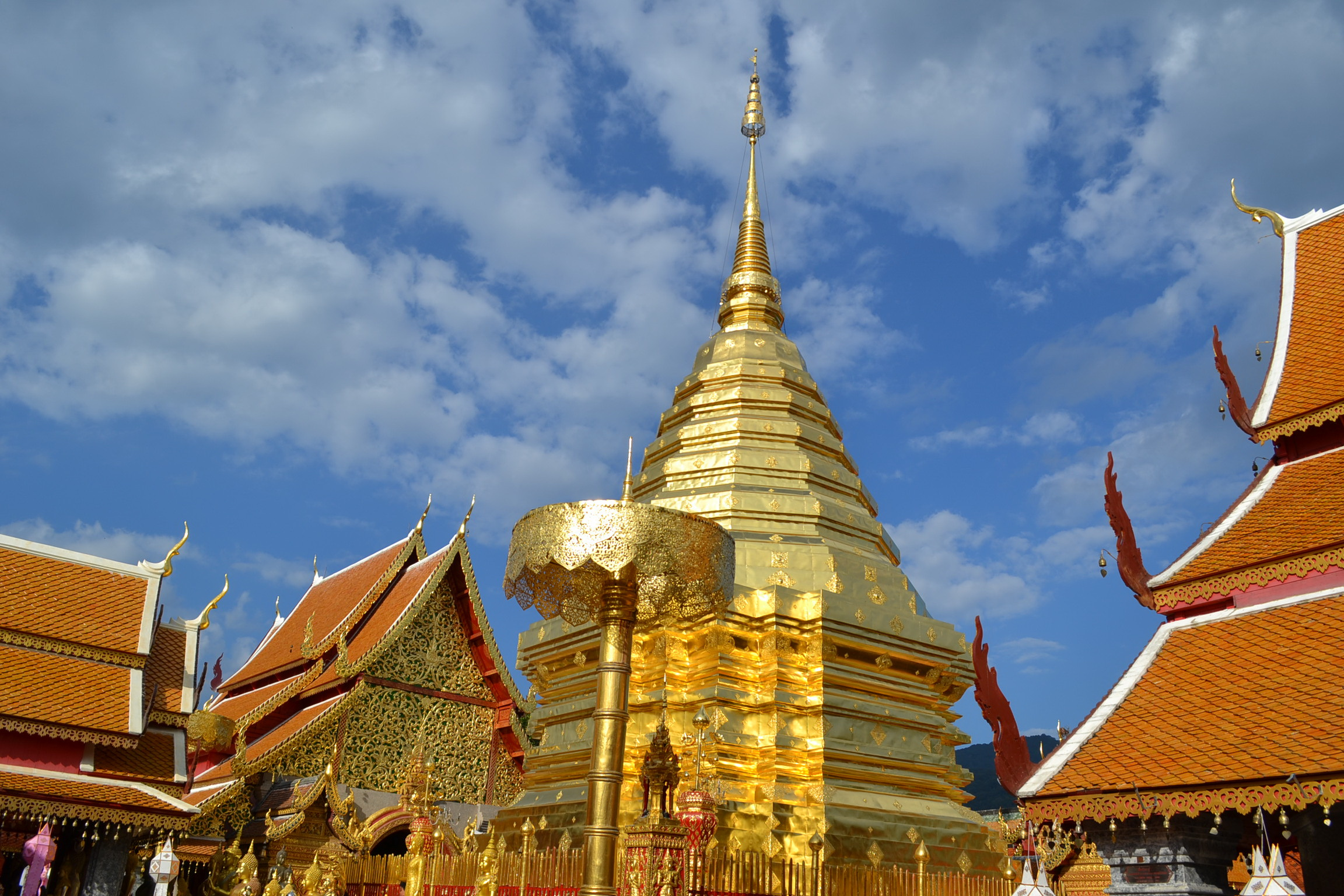
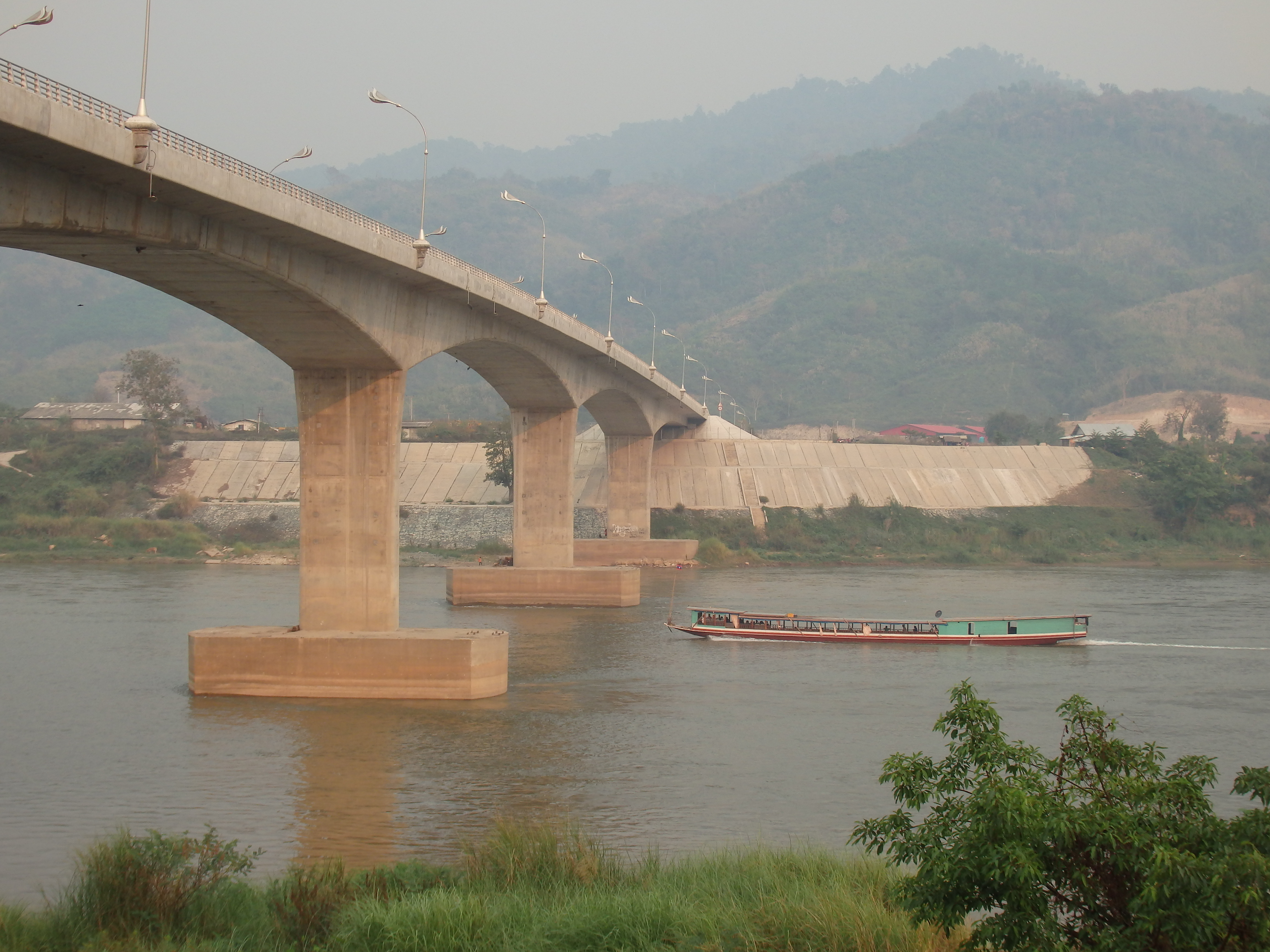
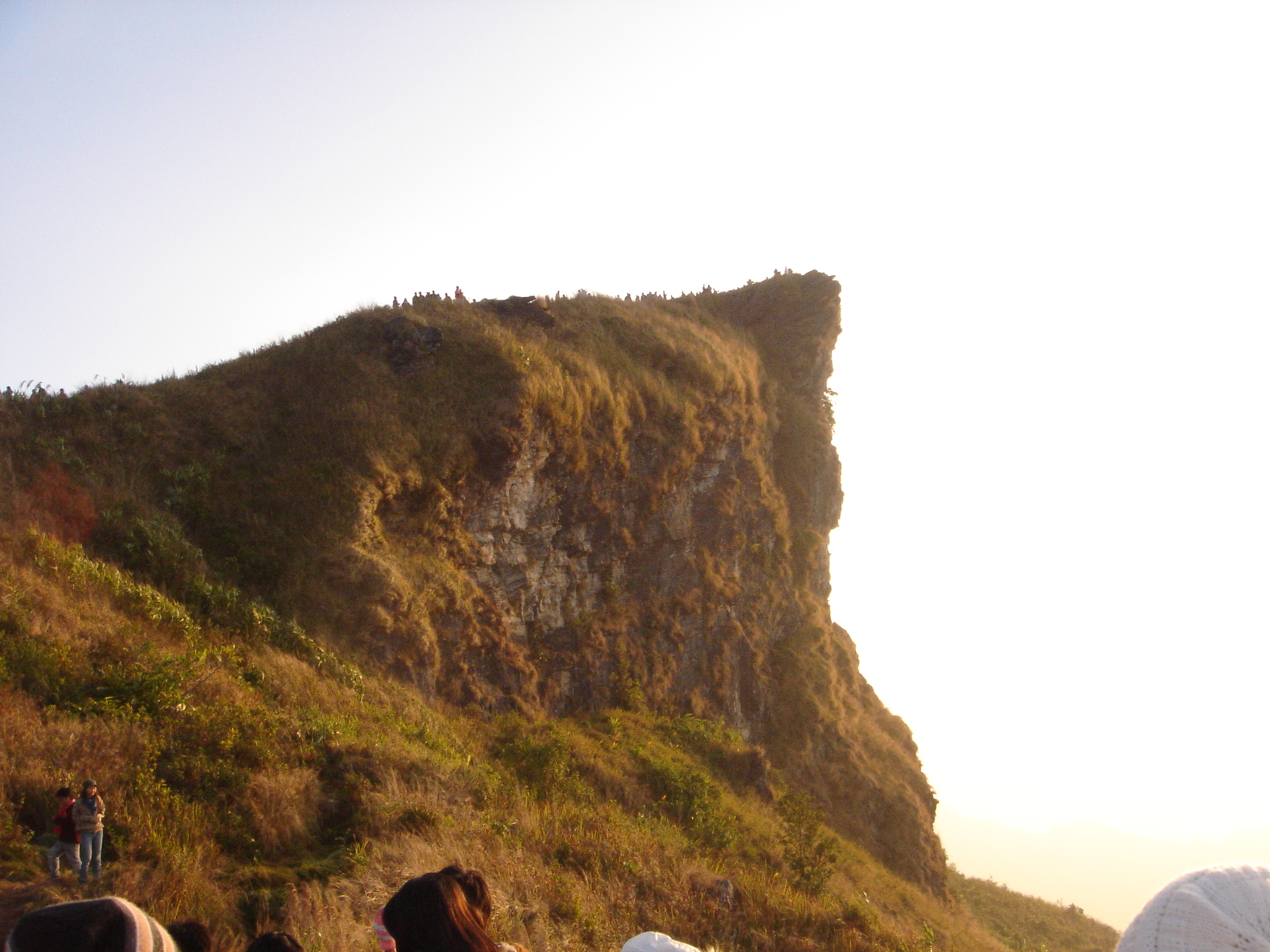
- From upper-left to lower-right: Doi Inthanon, Doi Pha Hom Pok, Wat Phra That Doi Suthep, Fourth Thai–Lao Friendship Bridge and Phu Chi Fa

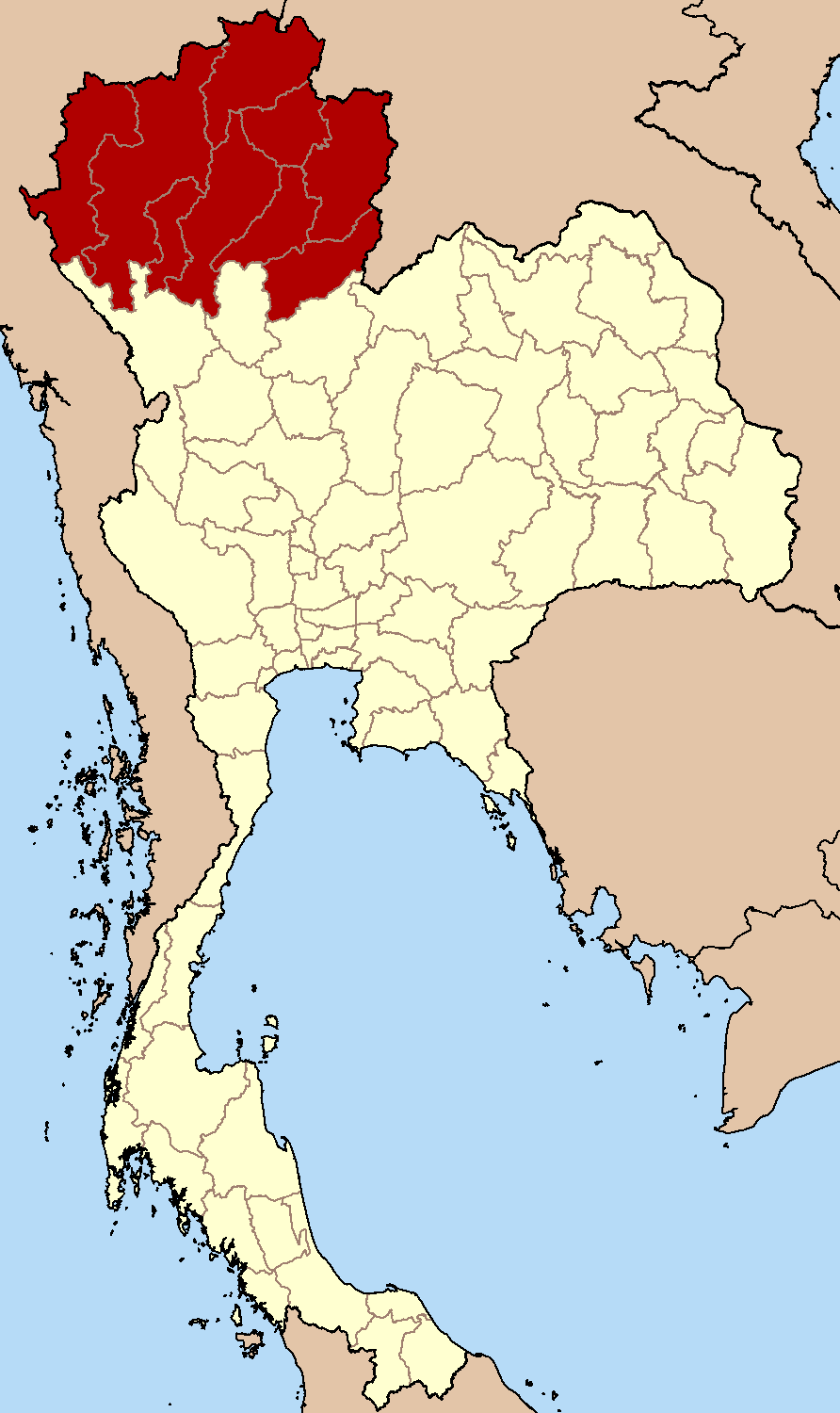
- Northern Region in Thailand
- Largest city: Chiang Mai
- Provinces: 9 Provinces: Chiang Mai Province; Lamphun Province; Lampang Province; Uttaradit Province; Phrae Province; Nan Province; Phayao Province; Chiang Rai Province; Mae Hong Son Province

Area
  - Total: 96,077 km^{2} (37,096 sq mi)

Population (2019)
  - Total: 12,119,572
  - Density: 66/km^{2} (170/sq mi)
- Demonym(s): Khon Muang (Lanna area); Khon Phak Klang (Northern cities area)

GDP (Nominal, 2024)
  - Metro: ฿1.452 trillion (US$41.237 billion)
  - Per capita: ฿130,685 (US$3,711)
- Time zone: UTC+07:00 (ICT)
- Language: Thai; Northern Thai; Lolo-Burmese; Karenic; Mienic; Palaungic; Southwestern Mandarin

Northern Thailand, or more specifically Lan Na, is a region of Thailand. It is geographically characterized by several mountain ranges, which continue from the Shan Hills in neighboring Myanmar to Laos, and the river valleys that cut through them. Like most of Thailand, it has a tropical savanna climate, but its relatively high elevation and latitude contribute to more pronounced seasonal temperature variation, with cooler winters than the other regions.

Historically, northern Thailand has been linked to the Hariphunchai Kingdom, which emerged as a powerful state in the region in the 7th century. This kingdom was related to the Dvaravati that existed from the 6th to 11th centuries. The Hariphunchai culture later influenced the development of the Lanna Kingdom, which emerged in the 13th century and lasted until the 18th century.

== Geography ==
North Thailand is bound by the Salween River in the west and the Mekong in the east. The basins of rivers Ping, Wang, Yom, and Nan, all tributaries of the Chao Phraya River, in the central part run from north to south and are mostly very wide. The basins cut across the mountains of two great ranges, the Thanon Range in the western part and the Phi Pan Nam in the eastern. Their elevations are generally moderate, a little above 2,000 metres (6,562 ft) for the highest summits. Although formerly forested, many of these mountains are now denuded.

Parallel mountain ranges extend from the Daen Lao Range, in the southern region of the Shan Hills, in a north–south direction, the Dawna Range forming the western border of Thailand between Mae Hong Son and the Salween River. To the east the Thanon Thong Chai Range, the Khun Tan Range, the Phi Pan Nam Range, as well as the western part of the Luang Prabang Range, form the natural region of the Thai highlands together with the former.

The high mountains are incised by steep river valleys and upland areas that border the central plain. A series of rivers, including the Nan, Ping, Wang, Yom, and Nan, flow southwards through mountain valleys and join to form the Chao Phraya in Nakhon Sawan Province in the central region. Sirikit Dam is on the Nan River in Uttaradit Province. The northeastern part is drained by rivers flowing into the Mekong basin, like the Kok and Ing.

The four-region system includes the northern parts of the central plain as well as some mountainous areas bordering the western and the northeastern limits. The total forest area is 90,228 km^{2} (34,837 sq mi) or 52.5 percent of this four-region area.

=== National parks ===
Within the northern region there are some sixty national parks. Chiang Mai Province has nine national parks of which Doi Inthanon National Park with the country's highest mountain and Op Luang National Park have a scenic river canyon, waterfalls, and caves. Doi Khun Tan National Park, which is located midway between the two provincial capitals of province Lampang and Lamphun, is best known for Thailand's longest railroad tunnel, which is 1,352 metres (4,436 ft) long. Doi Phu Kha National Park in province Nan is northern Thailand's largest national park.

== Regional classification of northern Thailand ==
The northern region, as defined by the National Geographical Committee in 1978, consists of nine provinces. Geographically the division, in conformance with the six-region system, includes most of the mountainous natural region of the Thai highlands.

In the four-region classification system, northern Thailand gains the eight upper-central-region provinces: Kamphaeng Phet, Nakhon Sawan, Phetchabun, Phichit, Phitsanulok, Sukhothai, Uthai Thani and Tak, bringing the total to 17 provinces.

In 2019 it is common to subdivide the northern region into: nine provinces of the upper northern region and eight provinces of the lower northern region. All websites of these eight provinces state: "located in the lower northern region".

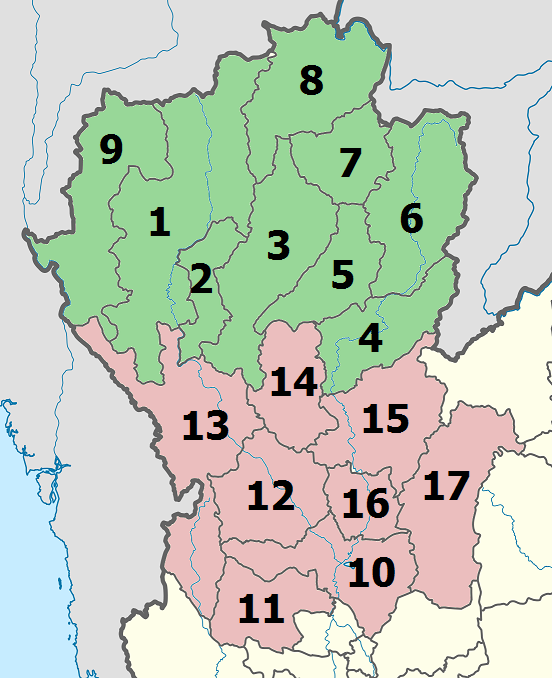
Lanna (green) and Northern cities (pink) provinces

Flag	Seal		Province	Capital	DOPA	Population	Area (km^{2})	Density	ISO
		1	Chiang Mai	Chiang Mai	14	1,779,254	22,135	79	TH-50
		2	Lamphun	Lamphun	54	405,075	4,478	92	TH-51
		3	Lampang	Lampang	53	738,316	12,488	59	TH-52
		4	Uttaradit	Uttaradit	75	453,103	7,906	58	TH-53
		5	Phrae	Phrae	41	441,726	6,483	68	TH-54
		6	Nan	Nan	26	478,227	12,130	40	TH-55
		7	Phayao	Phayao	34	472,356	6,189	76	TH-56
		8	Chiang Rai	Chiang Rai	13	1,298,304	11,503	113	TH-57
		9	Mae Hong Son	Mae Hong Son	45	284,138	12,765	23	TH-58
		10	Nakhon Sawan	Nakhon Sawan	23	1,059,887	9,526	111	TH-60
		11	Uthai Thani	Uthai Thani	76	328,618	6,647	50	TH-61
		12	Kamphaeng Phet	Kamphaeng Phet	5	725,867	8,512	86	TH-62
		13	Tak	Tak	17	665,620	17,303	39	TH-63
		14	Sukhothai	Sukhothai	66	595,072	6,671	89	TH-64
		15	Phitsanulok	Phitsanulok	38	865,247	10,589	82	TH-65
		16	Phichit	Phichit	37	536,311	4,319	124	TH-66
		17	Phetchabun	Phetchabun	40	992,451	12,340	80	TH-67

== Economy ==
For FY 2018, Northern Thailand Region had a combined economic output of 1,266 trillion baht (US$40.8 billion), or 7.7 percent of Thailand's GDP. Lamphun province had an economic output of 84.395 billion baht (US$2.7 billion). This equates to a GPP per capita of 211,489 baht (US$6,822), half more than for Chiang Mai province, next in the ranking and double than for Lampang province, which is third in the ranking.

Gross Provincial Product (GPP)
Rank	Province	GPP (million baht)	Population (x 1000)	GPP per capita (baht)
1	Lamphun	84,395	399	211,489
2	Chiang Mai	247,831	1,805	137,316
3	Lampang	71,950	714	100,709
4	Phayao	37,298	383	97,306
5	Chiang Rai	110,815	1,156	95,895
6	Uttaradit	39,190	416	94,260
7	Phrae	30,403	388	78,276
8	Nan	33,674	445	75,676
9	Mae Hong Son	13,728	235	58,370
	Upper provinces	669,284	5,941	112,655

View source data.

Kamphaeng Phet province had an economic output of 117.705 billion baht (US$3.8 billion). This amounts to a GPP per capita of 150,783 baht (US$4,864), half more than for Tak province, which is fifth in the ranking.

Gross Provincial Product (GPP)
Rank	Province	GPP (million baht)	Population (x 1000)	GPP per capita (baht)
1	Kamphaeng Phet	117,705	781	150,783
2	Nakhon Sawan	116,147	938	123,865
3	Phitsanulok	100,286	896	111,872
4	Uthai Thani	29,879	281	106,369
5	Tak	52,720	532	99,026
6	Phichit	48,347	518	93,265
7	Phetchabun	81,909	921	88,971
8	Sukhothai	50,384	613	82,147
	Lower provinces	597,377	5,480	109,010

View source data.

== Languages ==
Central Thai is the sole official language in Thailand. However, in the six-region classification system (nine changwat of Northern Thailand; Lanna area), it is the second largest native language in Northern Thailand, amounting to roughly two hundred thousand people, found in the lower part of Uttaradit province. In the four-region classification system, Central Thai is primary language in Southern part of Northern Thailand called Northern cities (หัวเมืองเหนือ), comprise a group of dialects classified as Ner (เหน่อ).

The main language in Lanna area is Northern Thai, which is a southwestern Tai language. It is spoken by roughly six million people. There are also various hill tribe languages such as Lolo-Burmese, Karenic, Mienic, Mienic, Palaungic, Southwestern Mandarin.

== See also ==
- Regions of Thailand
