= Oymasha =

Oymasha (Kazakh: Оймаша) may refer to:

- Oymasha oil field, Kazakhstan
- Oymasha training ground, military training ground, Kazakhstan
- Oymasha Lake, Kazakhstan
