= Race Across the World series 1 =

First series of Race Across the World

Race Across the World
- Series 1
- Presented by: John Hannah (narrator)
- No. of days: 50
- No. of contestants: 12
- Winners: Elaine and Tony Teasdale
- No. of legs: 6
- Distance traveled: 12,000 mi (19,000 km)
- No. of episodes: 6

Release
- Original network: BBC Two
- Original release: 3 March – 7 April 2019

Season chronology
- Next → Series 2

The first series of Race Across the World first aired on BBC Two from 3 March to 7 April 2019. Five pairs of racers travelled from London to Singapore, with the contestants each given £1,329 for the whole race without using air transport. The racers travelled over a distance of 12,000 miles in 50 days.

Start and end points
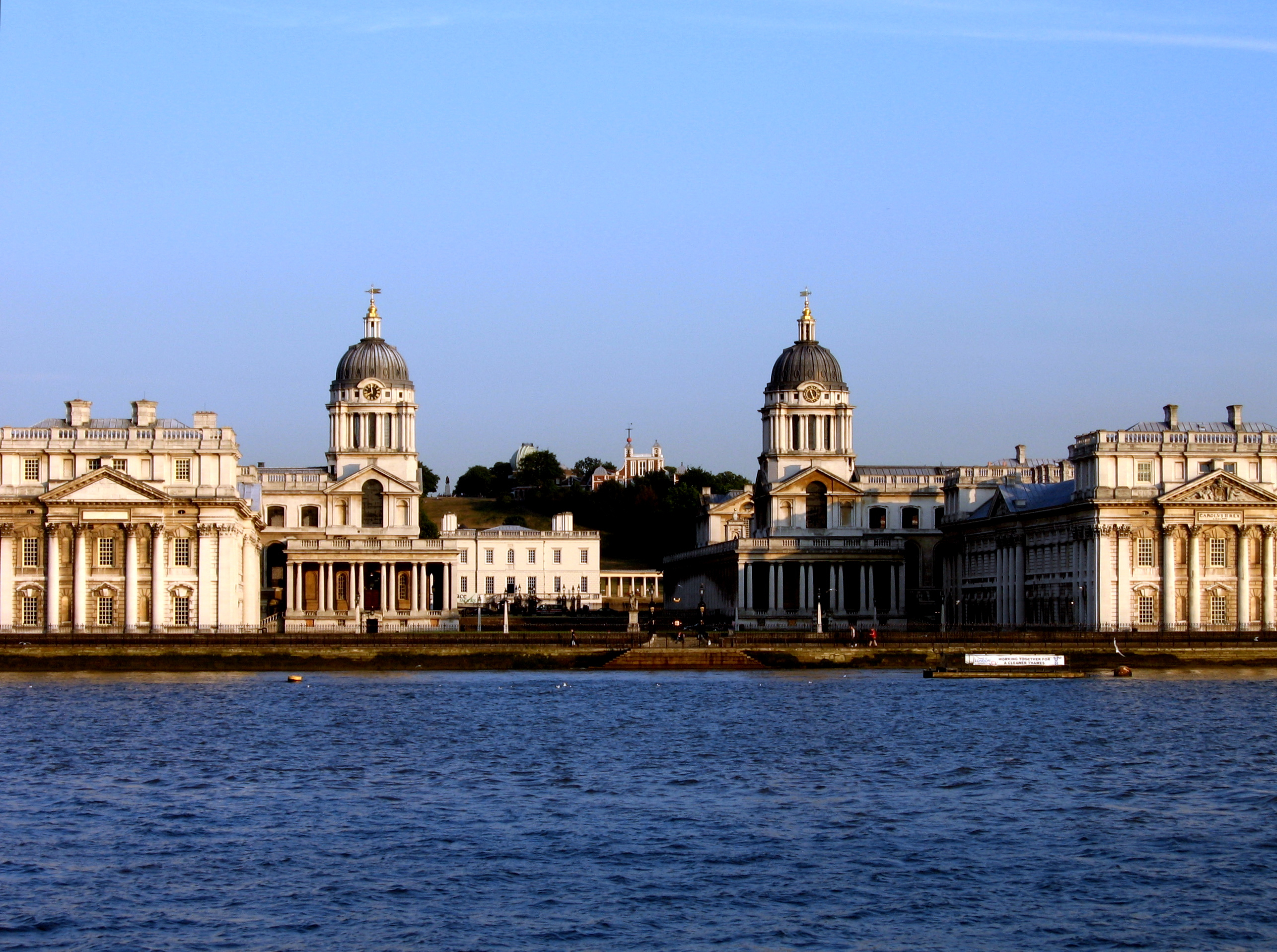
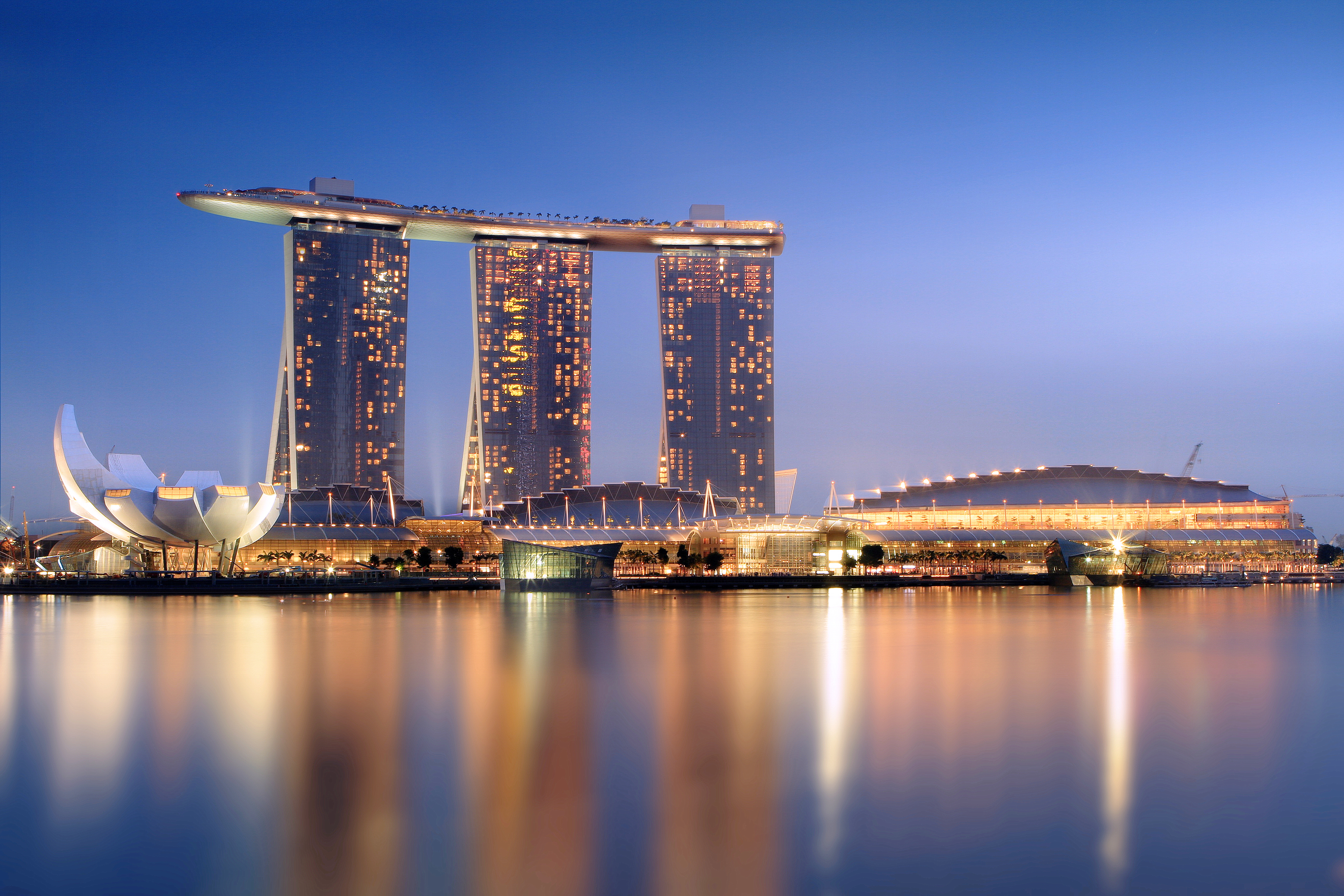
Old Royal Naval College (top) and Marina Bay Sands (bottom)

The first series featured five pairs of competitors at the start of the race: Natalie and Shameema, Jinda and Bindu, Darron and Alex, Josh and Felix, and Sue and Clare. Jinda and Bindu withdrew due to family illness in the first episode, and were replaced by Elaine and Tony. Sue and Clare were eliminated when they finished last in Baku. Retired PE teachers Elaine and Tony Teasdale were the first to reach the final checkpoint in Singapore, and were crowned the winners.

The series was the most successful debut for a factual entertainment show on BBC Two in over three years, and one of the most-watched shows of the year for the channel.

== Contestants ==
| Name | Relationship | Occupation | Age | From | Ref. |
|---|---|---|---|---|---|
| Darron Speck | Father & son | Business Systems Specialist | 48 | Bradford | |
| Alex Speck-Zolte | Father & son | Unemployed | 20 | Bradford | |
| Elaine Teasdale | Married couple | Retired PE teachers | 61 | Beadlam | |
| Tony Teasdale | Married couple | Retired PE teachers | 61 | Beadlam | |
| Josh Nawras | Business partners | Co-owners of arts venue | 32 | London | |
| Felix Mortimer | Business partners | Co-owners of arts venue | 32 | London | |
| Natalie Amoatin | Childhood friends | Freelance Legal/Artist Liaison Manager | 38 | London | |
| Shameema Mukhtar | Childhood friends | Cognitive Behavioural Psychotherapist | 38 | Manchester | |
| Sue Last | Lifelong friends | Three Menopausal Maids Comedy Trio | 57 | Bishop's Stortford | |
| Clare King | Lifelong friends | Marketing and Holiday Lettings Agent | 58 | Leeds | |
| Jinda | Married couple | Co-owner of small retail chain | 46 | Nottingham | |
| Bindu | Married couple | Co-owner of small retail chain | 48 | Nottingham | |

== Results summary ==
Colour key:

Team withdrawn
Team eliminated
Series winners

| Teams | Position (by leg) | | | | | |
| Teams | 1 | 2 | 3 | 4 | 5 | 6 |
|---|---|---|---|---|---|---|
| Elaine & Tony | 5th | 1st | 2nd | 4th | 1st | Winners |
| Darron & Alex | 2nd | 4th | 1st | 1st | 1st | 2nd |
| Natalie & Shameema | 3rd | 2nd | 4th | 3rd | 3rd | 3rd |
| Josh & Felix | 1st | 3rd | 3rd | 2nd | 3rd | 4th |
| Sue & Clare | 4th | 5th | | | | |
| Jinda & Bindu | N/A | | | | | |

== Route ==
The checkpoints in the first series were:

| Leg | From | To | Ref |
|---|---|---|---|
| 1 | Old Royal Naval College; London, United Kingdom | Amalia Hotel; Delphi, Greece | |
| 2 | Amalia Hotel; Delphi, Greece | The Flame Towers; Baku, Azerbaijan | |
| 3 | The Flame Towers; Baku, Azerbaijan | Hotel Uzbekistan; Tashkent, Uzbekistan | |
| 4 | Hotel Uzbekistan; Tashkent, Uzbekistan | Long Inn Hotel; Huangyao, China | |
| 5 | Long Inn Hotel; Huangyao, China | Sok San Beach Resort; Koh Rong, Cambodia | |
| 6 | Sok San Beach Resort; Koh Rong, Cambodia | Marina Bay Sands; Marina Bay, Singapore | |

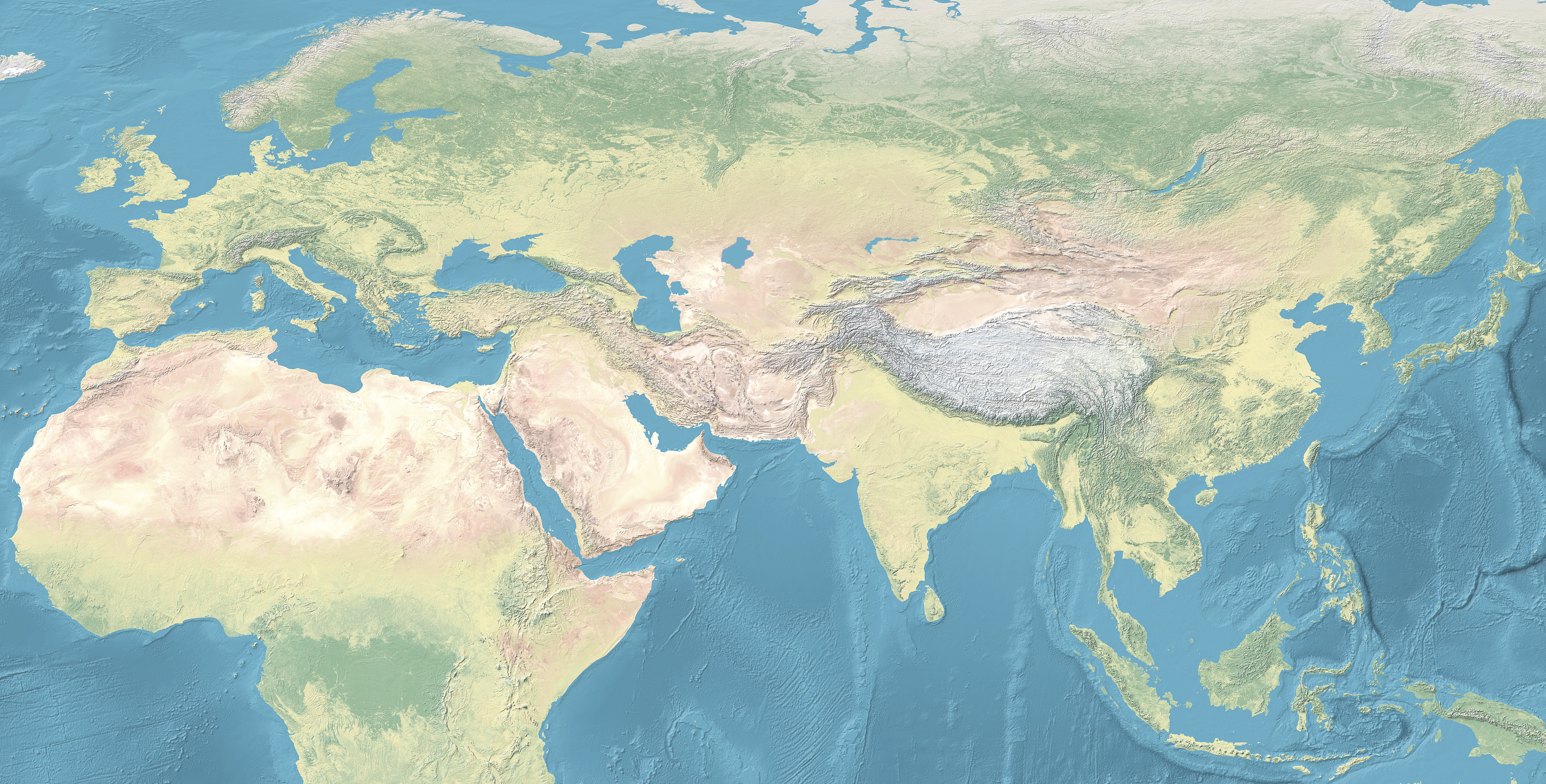
Checkpoints on Series 1: Checkpoint, Start, Finish

== Race summary ==
| Mode of transportation | Rail Ship Bus/coach Taxi Private car |
| Activity | Working for money and/or bed and board Excursion that cost time and money |

=== Leg 1: London, United Kingdom → Delphi, Greece ===
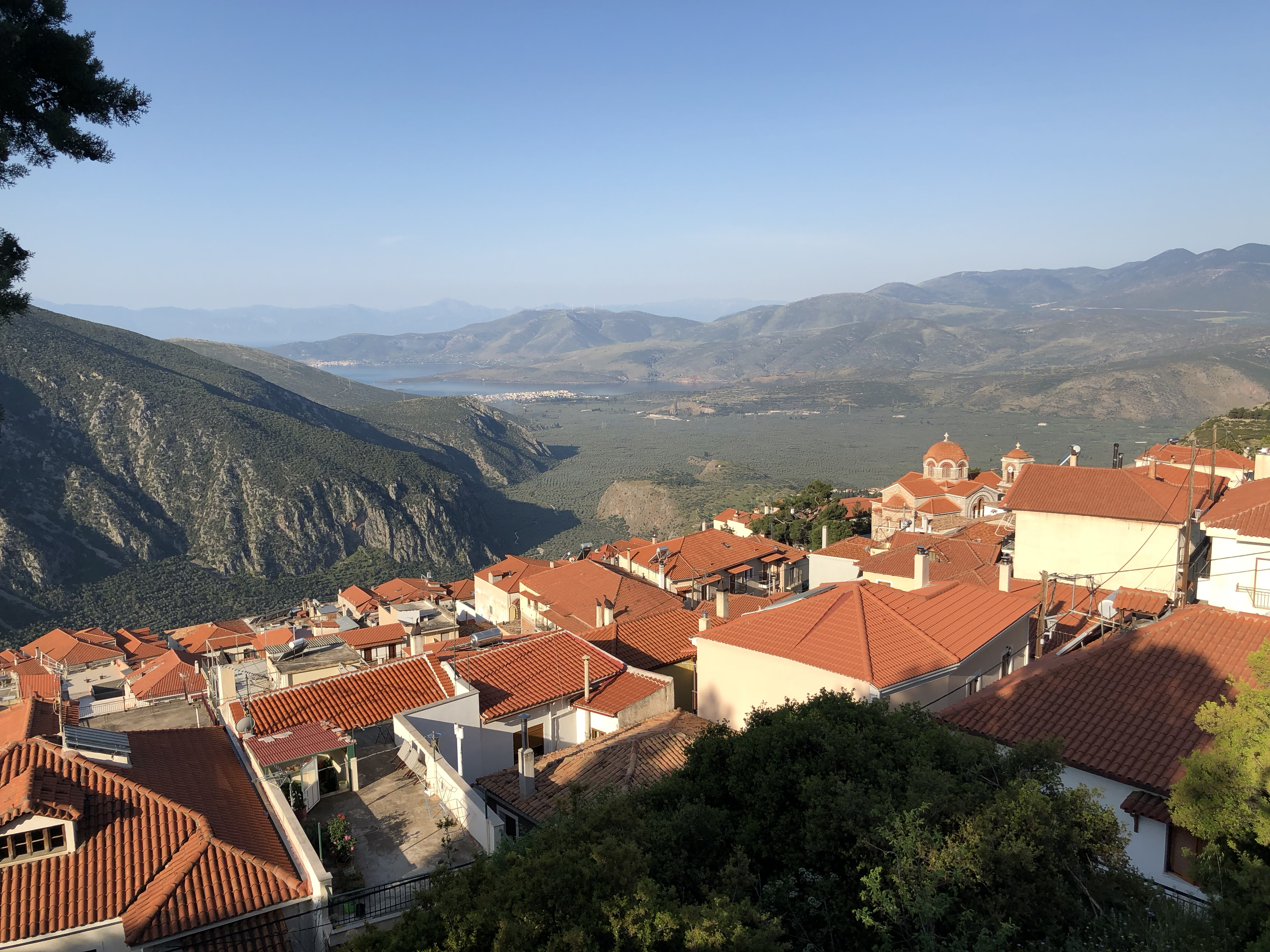
Delphi

The race started from Old Royal Naval College in London, finishing the first leg at the Amalia Hotel in Delphi, Greece.

Josh and Felix made it to Calais on the first day and went down to Munich on the second. They worked on a farm outside Munich and gained a significant increase in cash. They quickly spent this on a train to Budapest and a coach to Athens, swapping buses to reach Delphi on the sixth day.

Darron and Alex went on an overnight coach to Düsseldorf on Day One followed by another coach to Budapest, before catching a train to Belgrade. They were forced to splash out on a taxi to avoid being delayed in the Balkans, arriving four hours behind the leaders.

After a slow start, Natalie & Shameema took the ferry to Calais on Day Two before working in Lyon. They then went via Milan and over to the ferry port of Brindisi. They were the third team to reach Delphi.

Sue and Claire went via Lille and Paris to reach Milan, then travelled to Venice to catch a ferry to Greece. They arrived in Delphi 24 hours behind Josh and Felix.

Jinda and Bindu caught the ferry to Calais on Day One and made it to Aachen on the evening of Day 2, but returned home after receiving news of a family illness. Tony and Elaine took their place and went through France, Germany and into Italy and caught a ferry to Greece. They reached Delphi just a few minutes after Sue and Claire.

| Order | Teams | Route | Time behind leaders | Money left |
|---|---|---|---|---|
| 1 | Josh & Felix | → London Bridge → Dover → Calais → Lille → Munich → Budapest → → Delphi | —N/a | 82% |
| 2 | Darron & Alex | → Düsseldorf → Budapest → Belgrade → Skopje → Thessaloniki → Delphi | 4 | 73% |
| 3 | Natalie & Shameema | → Gravesend → Rochester → Dover → Calais → Lille → Lyon → Brindisi → Igoumenitsa → Delphi | 11 | 72% |
| 4 | Sue & Clare | → Waterloo East → → Ashford → → Dover → Calais → Lille → Paris → Milan → Venice → Patras → Delphi | 24 | |
| 5 | Elaine & Tony | → → → Milan → Bari → → Delphi | 24 | |
| N/A | Jinda & Bindu | → Dover → Calais → Lille → Aachen | N/A | N/A |

=== Leg 2: Delphi, Greece → Baku, Azerbaijan ===
The Flame Towers in Baku

The teams were informed that whoever arrived in Baku last would be eliminated. The two leading teams, Josh & Felix and Darron & Alex, took a boat to Çeşme and then to Ankara, where they took a slow Eastern Express train to Kars, which allowed the other teams to catch up. Fearing they were at risk of finishing fifth, Josh & Felix took an expensive taxi ride from Tbilisi to Baku.

All the other teams chose the land route via Istanbul, where Natalie & Shameema worked to earn some money. As they came last in the previous leg, Elaine & Tony chose to travel non-stop by train and bus to Tbilisi, before swiftly moving on again to reach Baku in first place on Day 13. In contrast, Sue & Clare decided to take a break in Tbilisi after a long bus journey, which resulted in their elimination.

| Order | Teams | Route | Time behind leaders | Money left |
|---|---|---|---|---|
| 1 | Elaine & Tony | → Livadeia → Thessaloniki → → Alexandroupoli → Istanbul → Tbilisi → → Baku | —N/a | 59% |
| 2 | Natalie & Shameema | → Livadeia → Thessaloniki → Istanbul → Tbilisi → → Baku | 3 | 63% |
| 3 | Josh & Felix | → Athens/Piraeus → Çeşme → Ankara → Kars → Tbilisi → Baku | 6 | 62% |
| 4 | Darron & Alex | → Athens/Piraeus → Çeşme → Ankara → Kars → Tbilisi → Baku | 11 | 59% |
| 5 | Sue & Clare | → Livadeia → Thessaloniki → → Istanbul → Tbilisi → → Baku | | |

=== Leg 3: Baku, Azerbaijan → Tashkent, Uzbekistan ===
Hotel Uzbekistan in Tashkent

View of Tashkent from Hotel Uzbekistan, the leg 3 destination

All four teams ended up on the same ferry from the Port of Baku in Älät to Kuryk. However, due to a storm on the Caspian Sea, they had to stay on the ship for five days.

On reaching Kazakhstan, three teams travelled through Uzbekistan from its western border with Kazakhstan to Tashkent. Only Josh & Felix chose the more northerly route through Kazakhstan. They stopped in Shymkent and travelled to watch a game of kokpar. Although their journey was longer, they arrived at the checkpoint at Tashkent only a couple of minutes behind Elaine & Tony.

Elaine & Tony travelled by taxis exclusively over a thousand miles from Kazakhstan until Samarkand, partly financing their spending spree by working as farm hands at a nomadic camp in the Kyzylkum Desert. Although they crossed paths with Darron and Alex in Samarkand while booking train tickets, the latter found an earlier connection to Tashkent and so arrived first at the checkpoint at Hotel Uzbekistan. Darron & Alex also managed to work in a paper factory in Nukus. This was not televised, but was revealed in an interview with Alex.

Natalie & Shameema took advantage of a free car ride from Kuryk; however, their departure was delayed for 36 hours while their driver made arrangements for his trip. He then paused in Khiva while waiting for word from a friend, so the pair decided to continue by train, but still finished in last place.

| Order | Teams | Route | Time behind leaders | Money left |
|---|---|---|---|---|
| 1 | Darron & Alex | → Älät → Kuryk → Aktau → Nukus → Samarkand → Tashkent | —N/a | 40% |
| 2 | Elaine & Tony | → Älät → Kuryk → Aktau → Kyzylkum Desert → Samarkand → Tashkent | 3 | 39% |
| 3 | Josh & Felix | → Älät → Kuryk → Aktau → → Aral → → Shymkent → Tashkent | 3 | 45% |
| 4 | Natalie & Shameema | → Älät → Kuryk → Aktau → Khiva → Bukhara → → Tashkent | 6.5 | 51% |

=== Leg 4: Tashkent, Uzbekistan → Huangyao, China ===
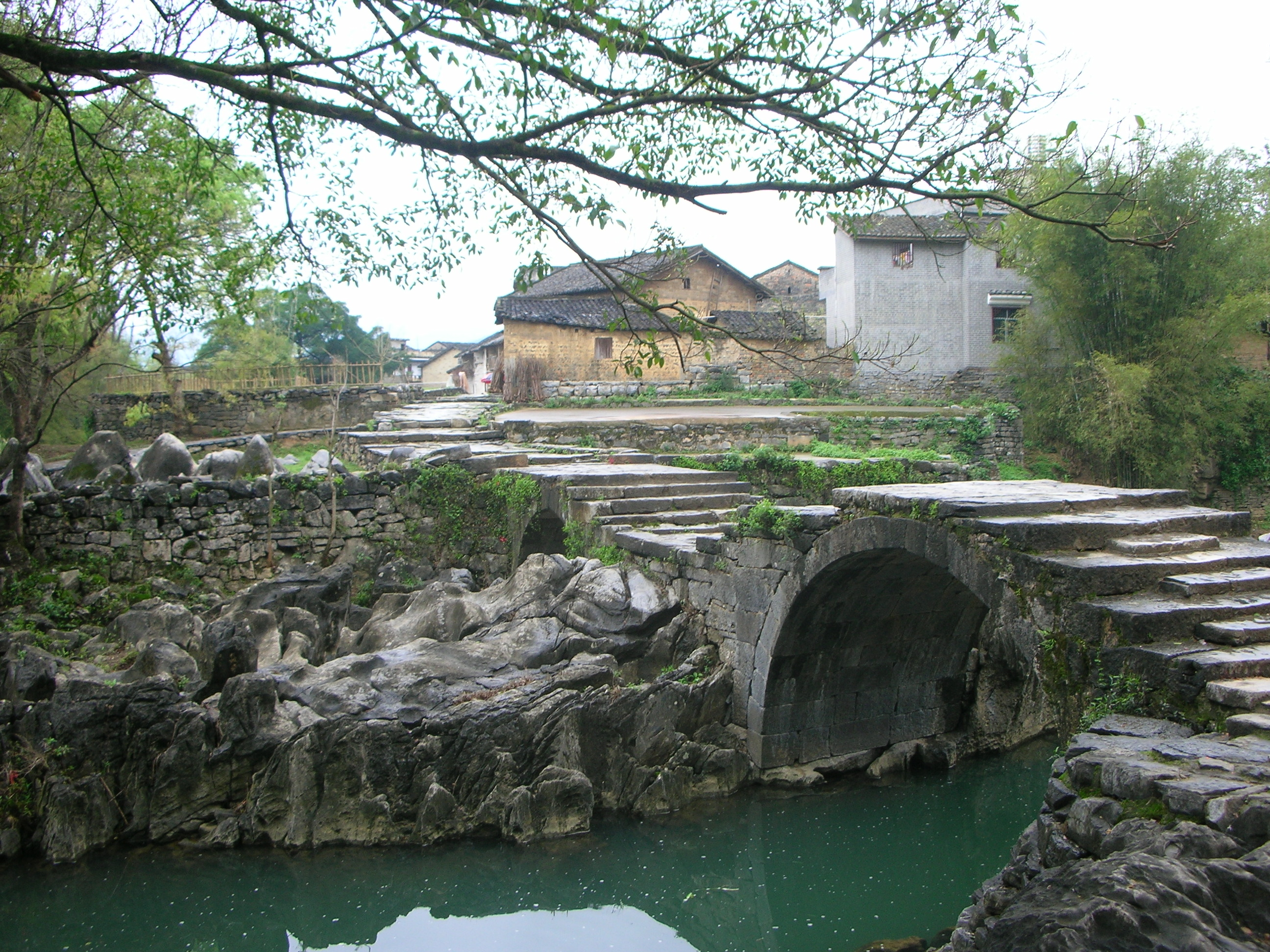
Huangyao

All teams travelled to Almaty in Kazakhstan to cross into China, via the Khorgas Border Crossing. Natalie & Shameema stopped in Almaty to visit the Shymbulak ski resort. All teams had to pass through Xinjiang—one of the autonomous regions of China and a politically sensitive region, which did not permit filming.

Darron & Alex went to Chengdu, where they worked in a flower shop to earn money, before using local knowledge to find the fastest connections. They reached Huangyao on Day 35, a day before the other teams. All the other teams travelled to Xi'an before heading south to Guilin in Guangxi, although Natalie & Shameema went to Jiayuguan first to see the Great Wall of China at Jiayu Pass. After arriving in Guilin, Josh & Felix decided to spend time and money going rock climbing at Yangshuo.

In order to save money, Tony & Elaine travelled on a slow train to Guilin, and took a break there. At the end of this episode, Tony & Elaine had still not arrived at the checkpoint. Their arrival was shown in the following episode, at which point it was confirmed that they were 38.5 hours behind leaders Darron & Alex, who had already departed on the next leg.

| Order | Teams | Route | Time behind leaders | Money left |
|---|---|---|---|---|
| 1 | Darron & Alex | → Shymkent → Almaty → Khorgas → → Chengdu → Guilin → Hezhou → Huangyao | —N/a | 17% |
| 2 | Josh & Felix | → Shymkent → Almaty → Khorgas → → Xi'an → Guilin / Yangshuo → Hezhou → Huangyao | 22 | 18% |
| 3 | Natalie & Shameema | → Shymkent → Almaty/Shymbulak → Khorgas → Jiayuguan / Jiayu Pass → Xi'an → Guilin → Huangyao | 26 | 22% |
| 4 | Elaine & Tony | → Shymkent → Almaty → Khorgas → → Xi'an → Guilin / Li River → Huangyao | 38.5 | 23% |

=== Leg 5: Huangyao, China → Koh Rong, Cambodia ===
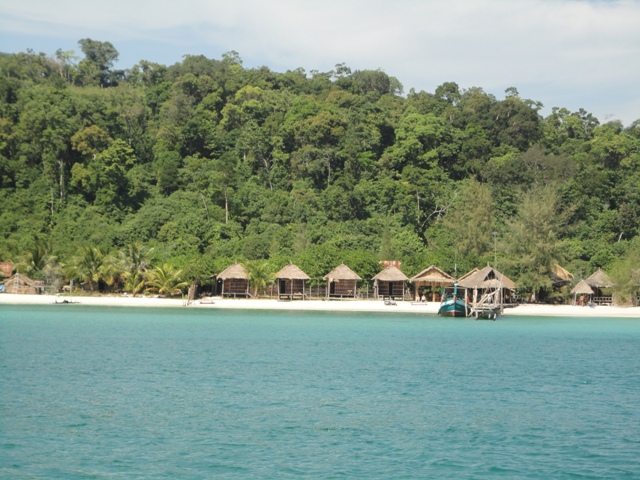
Koh Rong

Elaine & Tony were a long way behind the other teams, so they decided to spend money on taxis and express train to reach Vietnam before the border closed for the night. They were the only team to cross on the same day they left the checkpoint, and so made up much of the time lost during the previous leg.

Darron & Alex, despite a 22-hour advantage on their closest rivals, had to work in Hội An selling sugarcane juice as they were running low on funds, which allowed Elaine & Tony to catch up with them and they crossed the Cambodian border on the same bus. Darron & Alex decided to work for bed and board at an elephant sanctuary in Mondul Kiri while Elaine & Tony worked in a rice field in Kratié, but both teams took the same boat to Koh Rong and came in joint first place.

Both Josh & Felix and Natalie & Shameema opted for the southern route, and ended up on the same train to Ho Chi Minh City. They were delayed on the train by a typhoon for 14 hours, and arrived at Koh Rong on the same boat.

| Order | Teams | Route | Time behind leaders | Money left |
|---|---|---|---|---|
| 1 | Darron & Alex | → → Nanning → → Friendship Pass → Hanoi → Hội An → Pleiku → → Mondul Kiri → Phnom Penh → Sihanoukville → Koh Rong | —N/a | 7% |
| 1 | Elaine & Tony | → → Nanning → → → Friendship Pass → → Hanoi → Hội An → Pleiku → → Kratié → Phnom Penh → Sihanoukville → Koh Rong | —N/a | 13% |
| 3 | Josh & Felix | → Wuzhou → Nanning → Pingxiang → Friendship Pass → Hanoi → Ho Chi Minh City → → Sihanoukville → Koh Rong | 16 | 8% |
| 3 | Natalie & Shameema | → → Nanning → → Friendship Pass → → Hanoi → Hội An → Ho Chi Minh City → Hà Tiên → Sihanoukville → Koh Rong | 16 | 10% |

=== Leg 6: Koh Rong, Cambodia → Marina Bay, Singapore ===
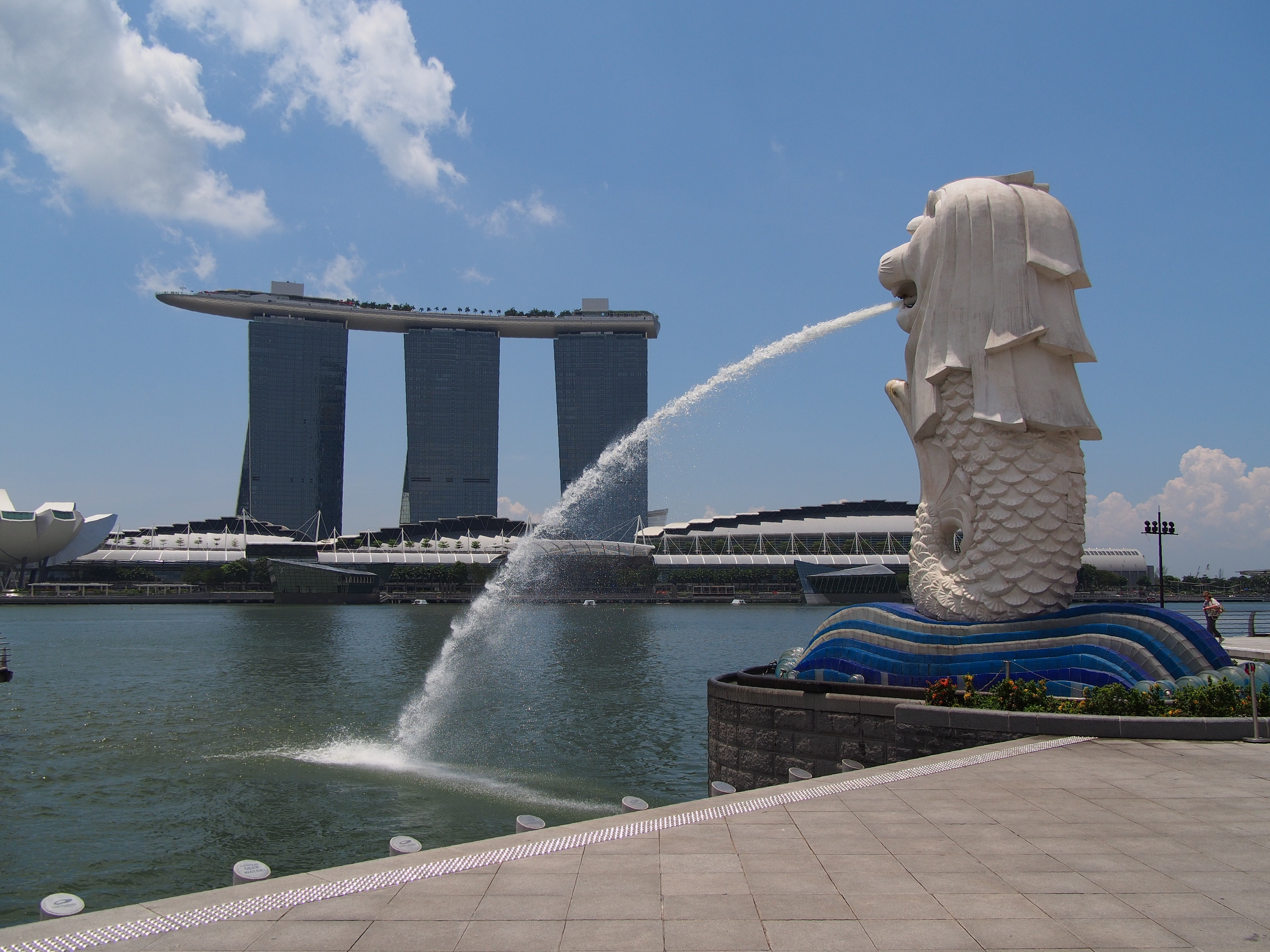
Singapore

Both Elaine & Tony and Natalie & Shameema spent funds on taxis to the Cambodian border. Darron & Alex and Josh & Felix had less money, and had to take a longer route to Bangkok via Phnom Penh. As Darron & Alex had little money left, they worked in Bangkok as dog walkers at a dog training centre. Tony injured his back while on the bus, and was forced to take a break in Krabi. However, Elaine & Tony managed to get the last seats on the direct bus to Singapore from Hat Yai. Although their bus broke down in Malaysia, they were the first team to reach the last checkpoint on the observation deck at Marina Bay Sands in Singapore, ahead of Darron & Alex.

Nearly out of cash, Josh & Felix had to work in a hostel in Krabi. They eventually finished last, and did not have enough money to reach the final checkpoint. However, they were given the money by Natalie & Shameema so they could complete the race.

| Order | Teams | Route | Time behind leaders | Money left |
|---|---|---|---|---|
| 1 | Elaine & Tony | → Sihanoukville → Trat → Bangkok → Krabi → Hat Yai → Singapore | —N/a | —N/a |
| 2 | Darron & Alex | → Sihanoukville → Phnom Penh → Bangkok → Krabi → Hat Yai → Kuala Lumpur → Singapore | 3 | —N/a |
| 3 | Natalie & Shameema | → Sihanoukville → Trat → Bangkok → Surat Thani → Hat Yai → Kuala Lumpur → Singapore | 20.5 | —N/a |
| 4 | Josh & Felix | → Sihanoukville → Phnom Penh → Bangkok → Krabi → Hat Yai → Kuala Lumpur → Singapore | 25.5 | —N/a |

== Reception ==
Race Across the World has received generally positive reviews mixed with some negative reviews. Michael Hogan of The Telegraph found the first series "fiendishly addictive", and thought that it "reaffirmed one's faith in human nature" where friendships are "formed across cultural divides", with the series ending on an act of kindness that was "apt" and "heartwarming". Jeff Robson of the i newspaper regarded the series "flawed but engaging", and considered that although the show lacked the "challenges of some extreme travelogues, nor the sense of peril", it "succeeded in recreating the combination of unexpected highlights, soul-destroying lows and crucial budget decisions which characterised old-school seat of the pants travel". Carol Midgley of The Times regarded the challenge of racing to be "quite tough" and "dramatic".

== Ratings ==
The first episode had an overnight viewing figure of 1.5 million. The audience grew over the weeks, and in the final episode, it had an overnight viewing figure of 2.4 million.

| Episode | Airdate | 7 day viewers (millions) | 28 day viewers (millions) | BBC Two weekly ranking |
|---|---|---|---|---|
| 1 | 3 March 2019 | 1.930 | 2.335 | 6 |
| 2 | 10 March 2019 | 2.480 | 2.945 | 3 |
| 3 | 17 March 2019 | 2.466 | 2.806 | 4 |
| 4 | 24 March 2019 | 2.609 | 2.877 | 3 |
| 5 | 31 March 2019 | 2.732 | 3.001 | 2 |
| 6 | 7 April 2019 | 3.306 | 3.495 | 2 |
