= Birlestik =

Birlestik may refer to:

- Birlestik, Akmola Region, Zerendi District, Akmola Region, Kazakhstan
- Birlestik, North Kazakhstan Region, Aiyrtau District, North Kazakhstan Region, Kazakhstan
- Birlestik-2024 military exercise in Kazakhstan
