= Kendirli (disambiguation) =

Kendirli is a town in the Rize District, Rize Province, Turkey

Kendirli or Kenderli may also refer to:

- Kendirli, Bilecik, village in Bilecik Province, Turkey
- Kendirli Bay, Caspian Sea
- Kendirli (village), Kazakhstan
- Kendirli Rural Akimat, Kazakhstan
- Kendirli Lake, Kazakhstan
- Kendirli Spit, Kazakhstan
