= Birlestik-2024 =

Multinational military exercise in Kazakhstan

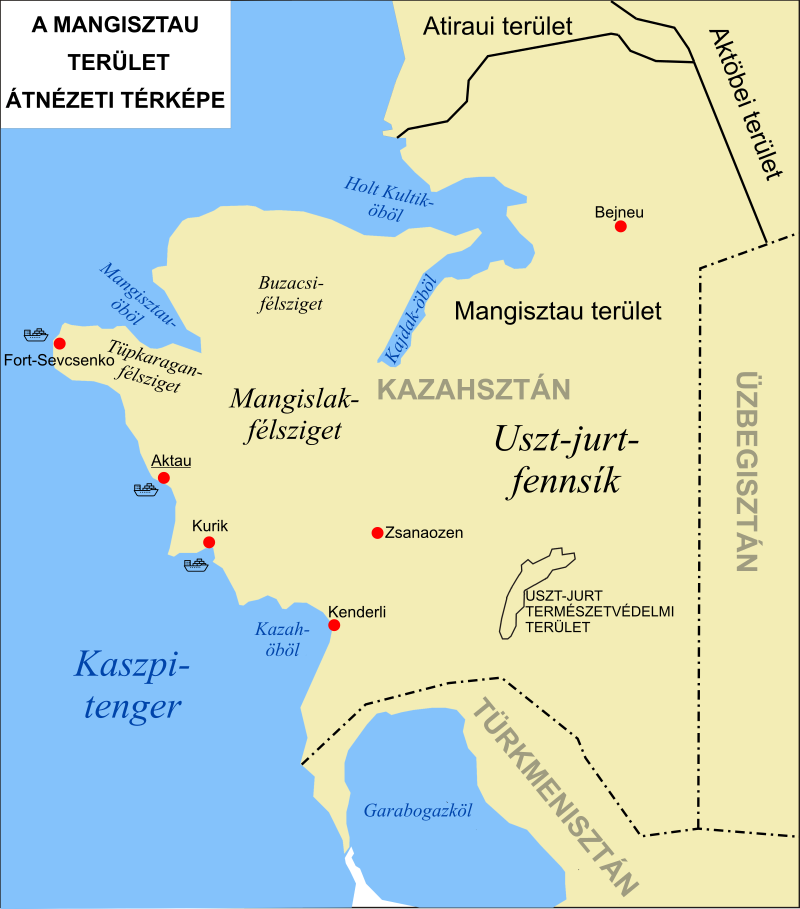
Map of the Mangystau region

Birlestik-2024 (Kazakh: Бірлестік-2024) was a joint command and staff military exercise of Azerbaijan, Kazakhstan, Kyrgyzstan, Tajikistan and Uzbekistan, which took place in Kazakhstan between 9 and 17 July 2024.

The exercise took place in several phases and across two locations, the Oymasha training ground 30 km off the city of Aktau and a sea area two kilometers from Cape Tokmak (42°47′15″N 52°17′33″E) in the Kazakh Bay, in the Karakiya District, Mangystau Region, as planned during a preparatory phase which had taken place earlier in July.

== Phases ==
=== Tactical phase ===
The Kyrgyzstani ministry of defense had earlier presented a counterinsurgency scenario where joint forces had to liberate an island seized by "terrorists". After the liberation of the island, the scenario involved the enemy "armed group" retreating into an entrenched position on the mainland, requiring a final, coordinated assault by all participating contingents.

=== Sports competition ===
After the completion of the simulation, a "tactical orienteering competition" named "Bagdar" (Kazakh: Бағдар) was planned on 13 July 2025, as well as a tactical shooting contest and a military sports (arm wrestling, kettlebell lifting, minifootball, and tug of war) competition. On July 18th, the Kyrgyzstani Ministry of Defense announced that servicemen of the Scorpion 25th Special Forces Brigade had won the "Bagdar" competition, as well as the shooting contest, and took second place in mini-football, and third place in tug-of-war and weightlifting, taking first place in the overall team competition..

=== Closing ceremony ===
The ceremony was attented by the ministers of defense of Kazakhstan, Azerbaijan, Uzbekistan, and Kyrgyzstan, whereas Tajikistan was represented by the first Deputy Chief of the General Staff of its Armed Forces.

According to Azerbaijani state media, representatives of 15 non-participating states attended the closing ceremony on 17 July 2025.

== Participants ==
The field-training component of the exercise officially involved 4,000 + servicemen and 700 pieces of equipment in total, across land, air and sea.

=== Kazakhstani contingent ===
An earlier publication by the Kazakhstani Ministry of Defense announced the joint participation of "air and land reconnaissance groups", navy special forces units, aviation, warships, artillery, and "assault and armored units", although it did not disclose the volume of each of these components.

=== Azerbaijani contingent ===
The Azerbaijani Ministry of Defense announced that it had deployed an undisclosed number of "Army commandos, paratroopers, and search and rescue teams, alongside Su-25 aircraft from the Air Force and patrol and landing ships from the Navy" to Kazakhstan for the exercise.

=== Kyrgyzstani contingent ===
The Kyrgyzstani contingent included a undisclosed number of servicemen from the "Operational Group of the Ministry of Defense" as well as operators of the 52806 military unit, also known as Scorpion 25th Special Forces Brigade.

== See also ==
- Birlik-2025
