= Kazakh Bay =

Bay of the Caspian Sea in Kazakhstan

- Қазақ шығанағы (Kazakh)
- Location within Caspian Sea
- Location: Kazakhstan
- Coordinates: 42.55°N 52.35°E

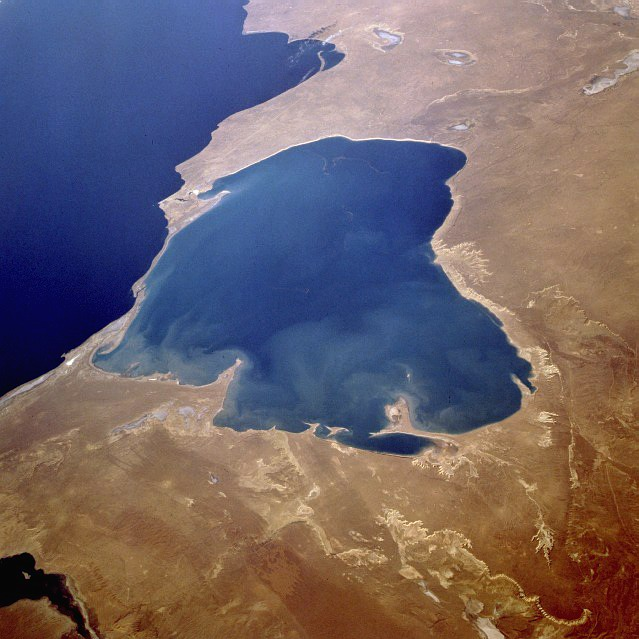
Kazakh Bay is at the top of the image

The Kazakh Bay Kazakh: Қазақ шығанағы is a bay along the eastern shore of the Caspian Sea, north of Garabogazköl, in the Karakiya District, Mangystau Region, Kazakhstan. It includes the Kendirli Bay.
