= Flame Towers =

Coordinates: 40°21′34″N 49°49′36″E

- Alov qüllələri

General information
- Status: Complete (MOO)
- Type: office, residential, hotel, shopping mall
- Architectural style: Highrise, glass
- Location: Baku, Azerbaijan
- Construction started: October 2007
- Opening: 2013
- Cost: US$350 million
- Owner: Azinko Development MMC

Height
- Roof: 182 m (597 ft) - Flame Tower 1; 165 m (541 ft) - Flame Tower 2; 161 m (528 ft) - Flame Tower 3

Technical details
- Floor count: 33/30/28

Design and construction
- Architect: HOK
- Structural engineer: Balkar Mühendislik
- Main contractor: DIA Holding Azerbaijan

Website
- www.fairmont.com/baku/

The Flame Towers (Azerbaijani: Alov qüllələri) are a group of three skyscrapers in Baku, Azerbaijan. The main contractor, Dia Holdings, is owned by two brothers who are linked to Azerbaijan's ruling Aliyev family's network of offshore companies.

The height of the tallest tower is 182 m (597 ft). The three flame-shaped towers are intended to symbolize the elements of fire, and are a reference to Azerbaijan's nickname "The Land of Fire", historically rooted in a region where natural gas flares emit from the ground and Zoroastrian worshipers considered flames to be a symbol of the divine (notably at the Ateshgah of Baku and Yanar Dag).

The three buildings (South, East and West) consist of 130 residential apartments over 33 floors, a Fairmont hotel tower that includes 250 rooms and 61 serviced apartments, and office blocks which provides a net 33,114 square meters of office space.

== Construction ==
The cost of Flame Towers was an estimated US$350 million. Construction began in 2007, with completion in 2012. HOK was the architect for the project, DIA Holdings served as the design-build contractor, and Hill International provided project management.

== Illumination ==
The Flame Towers are completely covered with LED screens that display the movement of a fire, visible from the furthest points of the city. The facades of the three Flame Towers function as large display screens with the use of more than 10,000 high-power LED luminaires, supplied by the Osram subsidiary Traxon Technologies and Vetas Electric Lighting. The light show transitions from giant flames, the colours of the Azerbaijani flag, a figure waving a flag, and huge tanks of water being filled. Transition times are roughly two minutes.

== In culture ==
The buildings are featured in Extreme Engineering, a documentary television series that airs on the Discovery Channel and the Science Channel. The episode called "Azerbaijan's Amazing Transformation" was broadcast on 22 April 2011 as part of Season 9.

The Flame Towers also appeared prominently in trailers before many entries for the Eurovision Song Contest 2012 hosted in Baku (and, in the next 4 years, with the pre song trailer based in the singer's home area, features in the trailer before the Azerbaijan song).

The towers are also a prominent landmark in the video game Battlefield 4, with the first level of the single player campaign taking place in Baku. Additionally, the towers were often shown during coverage of the initial Formula One European Grand Prix held in Baku.

The towers featured as the second checkpoint in the first series of the BBC reality TV show Race Across the World, also acting as the race’s elimination leg.

== Criticism ==
A peer-reviewed publication in 2020 noted the Flame Towers "...are something of a Potemkin edifice in that one of the towers houses a Fairmont Hotel while the other two are unoccupied."

== Gallery ==

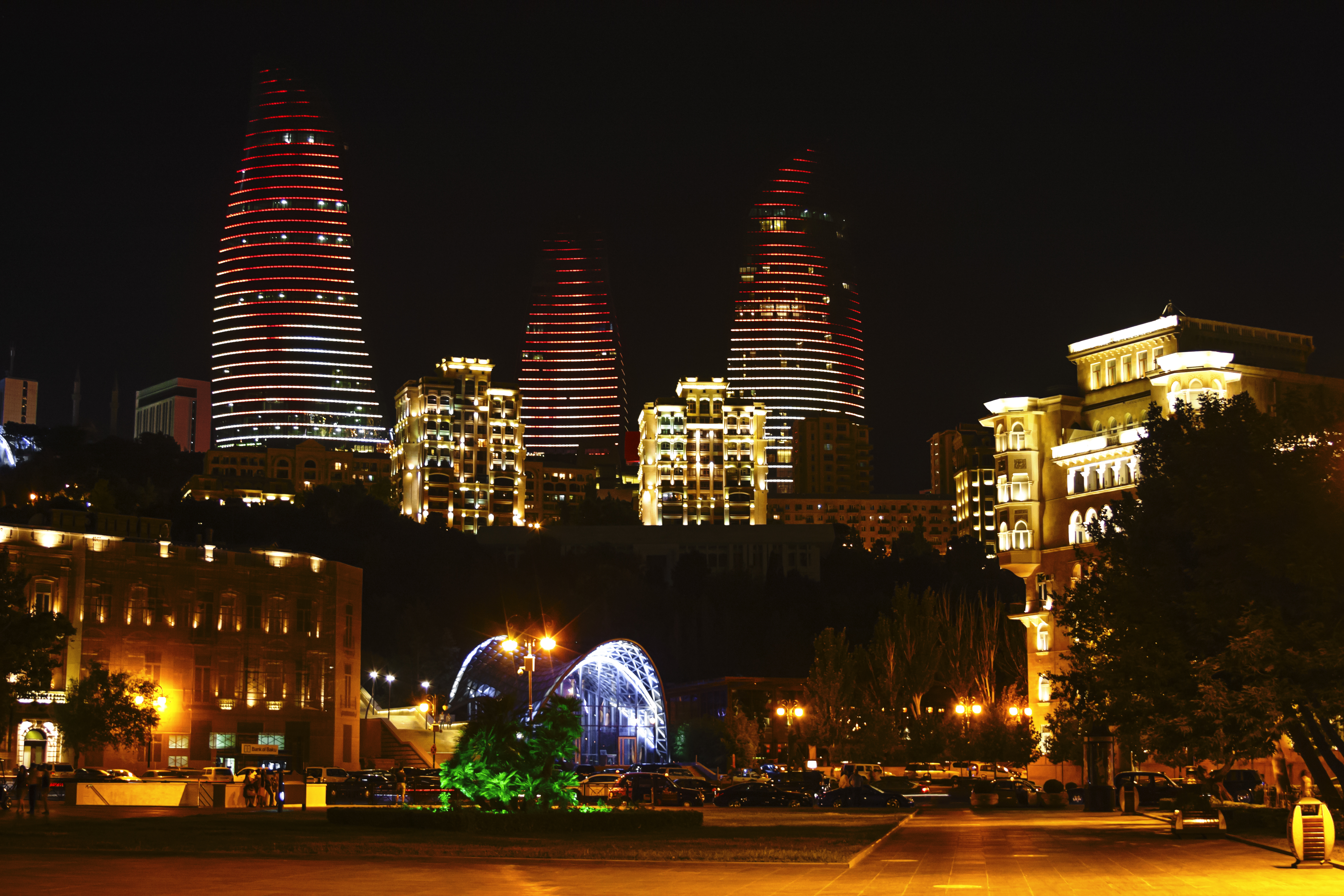

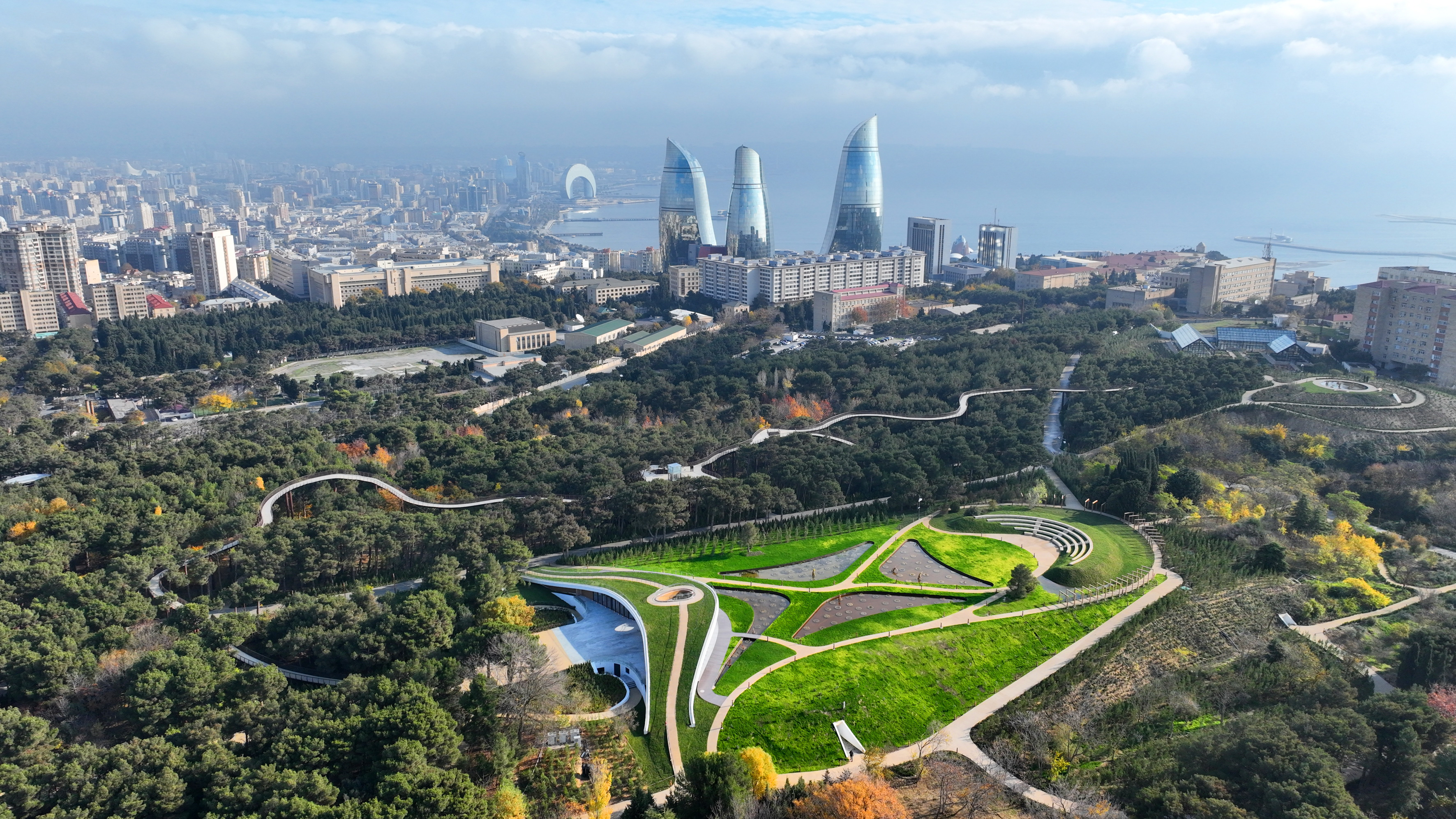
