= Kendirli Bay =

Bay of the Caspian Sea

- Кендірлі (Kazakh)
- Location within Caspian Sea
- Location: Kazakhstan
- Coordinates: 42°40′57″N 52°41′42″E
- Surface area: 18,000 square kilometres (6,900 mi^{2})

The Kendirli Bay (Kazakh: Кендірлі шығанағы; also transliterated from Russian sources as Kenderli Bay) is a bay of the southeastern Caspian Sea in the territory of Karakiya District, Kazakhstan, north of the Garabogazköl lagoon, within the Kazakh Bay. Its northernshore is on the Mangyshlak Peninsula.

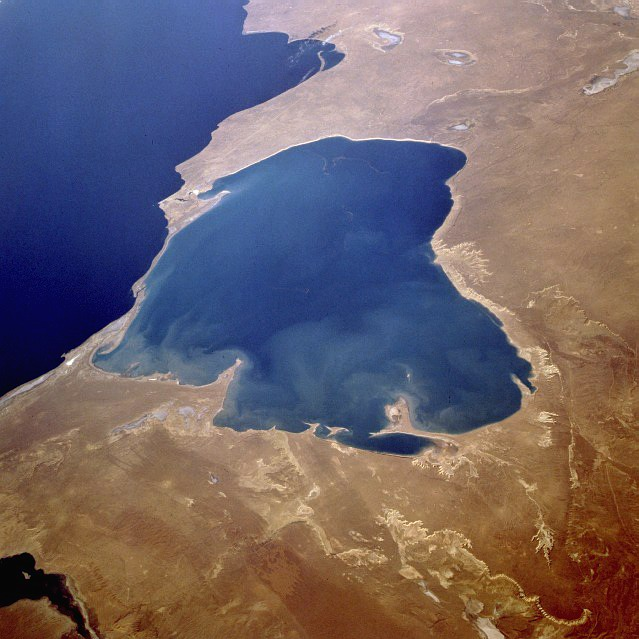
Kazakh Bay is at the top of the image

It is partially separated from the Caspian Sea by the Kendirli Spit of length 23 km, width 3–3.5 km, altitude of 110–112 m above the sea level.

Populated places: Aksu, Fetisovo.

On its islands and on the spit there is the only habitat of the Caspian seal in the mid-Caspian Sea, and the Nature Reserve for Conservation of the Caspian Seal (Pusa caspica).
