= Panos Koutrouboussis =

Greek writer and artist (1937–2019)

- Born: 1937; Livadeia, Greece
- Died: 20 March 2019 (aged 82); Athens
- Occupations: poet, prose writer
- Writing career
- Period: 1978–2019

Panos Koutrouboussis (Greek: Πάνος Κουτρουμπούσης; 1937 – 20 March 2019) was a Greek writer and artist. He studied film directing at the Centro Sperimentale di Cinematografia at Rome. He worked as an assistant director and assistant producer in Greek and foreign films, he illustrated book covers and record sleeves, and he also was a radio producer for the Greek Service of the BBC. He directed short silent films, and a documentary on bouzouki musicians and he was part of the editorial group for the periodical Pali (1964–1966).

== Works ==
=== Short stories ===
- Εν Αγκαλιά de Κρισγιαούρτι y otros Ταχυδράματα y Historias Περίεργες (In the Embrace of Krisyaourti, y Otros Tachydramas y Weird Historias), 1978
- Στον Θάλαμο του Μυθογράφφ (In Mythograff's Chamber), 1992
- Η Ταβέρνα του Ζολά (Zola's Taverna), 1997
- Το Κεντράκι του Ταρζάν (Tarzan's Little Joint), 2005

=== Poetry ===
- Η Εποχή των Ανακαλύψεων (The Age of Discoveries), 2002

=== Other ===
- Τι Τρέχει; (WhazUp?), 2000
- Εικόνες στην Aμμο + Ο Μπάροουζ στην Ουάσιγκτον (Images in the Sand + Burroughs in Washington), 2005
