= Center 2011 =

Collective Security Treaty Organization military exercise

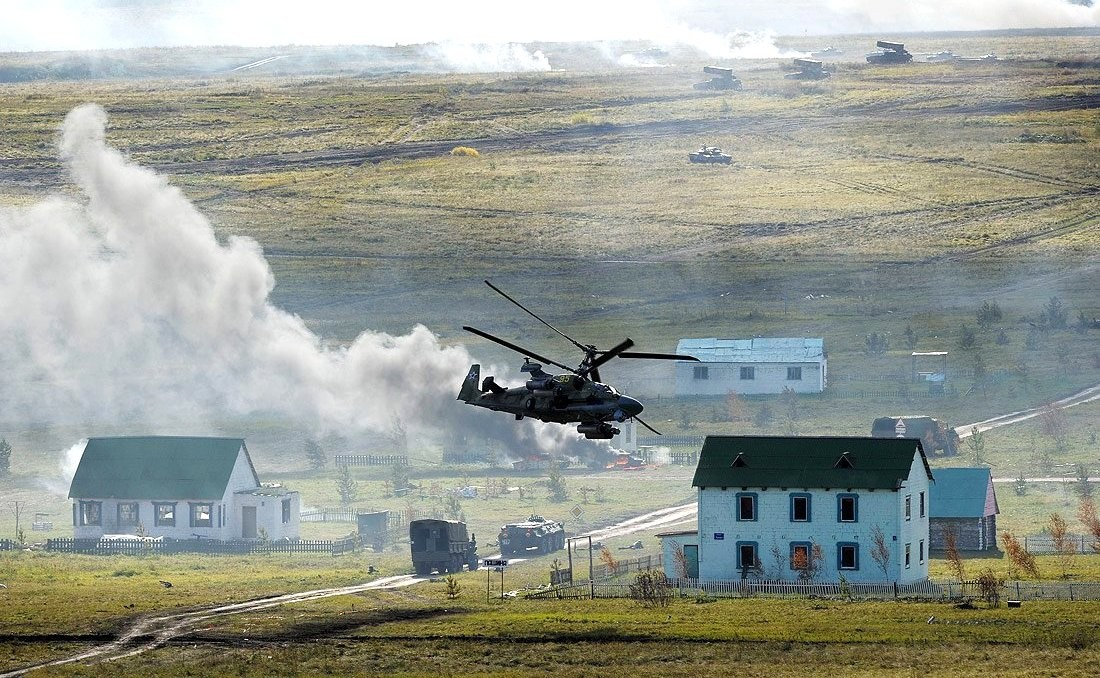
Center 2011 exercise at Chebarkul

Center 2011 Russian: Центр 2011, romanized: Tsentr 2011 was a military exercise carried out by Russia and other ODKB forces (Belarusian, Kyrgyz, Kazakh, and Tajik) in September 19 – September 27, 2011. Full name: Operational-strategic exercise Tsentr-2011. It involved 12,000 personnel, hundreds of armored vehicles, 50 aircraft and helicopters, and the Caspian Flotilla.

The exercise was carried out at 6 locations in Russia, Kazakhstan, Kyrgyzstan, and Kazakhstan:

- Librating a town from terrorists were practiced at the Chebarkul training ground, Russia.
- At Gorokhovets operations against enemy airborne assaults, specops, and "illegal armed formations" were practiced.
- Russian and Kazakh forces trained at a Caspian Sea location and at the Oymasha training ground.
- The ODKB Collective Rapid Reaction Forces command and staff exercise was conducted at the Lyaur mountain training ground, 10 km southwest of Dushanbe, Tajikistan.
- Cantral Asian forces of ODKB were training at a location in Kyrgyzstan against "illegal armed formations".

== See also ==
- List of Center exercises
