= Oymasha training ground =

Military training area in Kazakhstan

Oymasha (Kazakh: Оймаша) is a military training center and training area in Mangystau Region, western Kazakhstan, some 30 km off the city of Aktau.

== Notable exercises ==
- Center 2011, September 2011
- Center 2015, September 2015
- Kanjar–2023 (Kazakh: Қанжар-2023, Uzbek: Xanjar-2023; Kazakhstan and Uzbekistan); 1st stage: command and staff operational/tactical computer exercise, 2nd stage: ground exercise.
- Birlestik-2024, July 2024
