= Oymasha Lake =

Lake in Kazakhstan

Coordinates: 43°39′3″N 51°11′48″E

Oymasha, also Small Oymasha (Malaya Oymasha, Uzbek: кіші Оймаша, romanized: Kishi Oymasha) is a lake in Munaily District, Mangystau Region, Kazakhstan in the suburbs of the city of Aktau.

It is located between Aktau and the village of Atameken, Munaily District and is surrounded by a number of private residential areas. Its water is multicolored, some parts are pink and some are green. Its area is 62 hectares and the depth is several meters. As of 2025, the lake area is ecologically endangered due to its high salinity and alleged radioactive contamination (being used for disposal of waste waters from the uranium enrichment factory in Aktau in Soviet times); also due to an illegal landfill in a private plot by the lake.
