= Huangyao =

Huangyao 黄姚镇
- Town
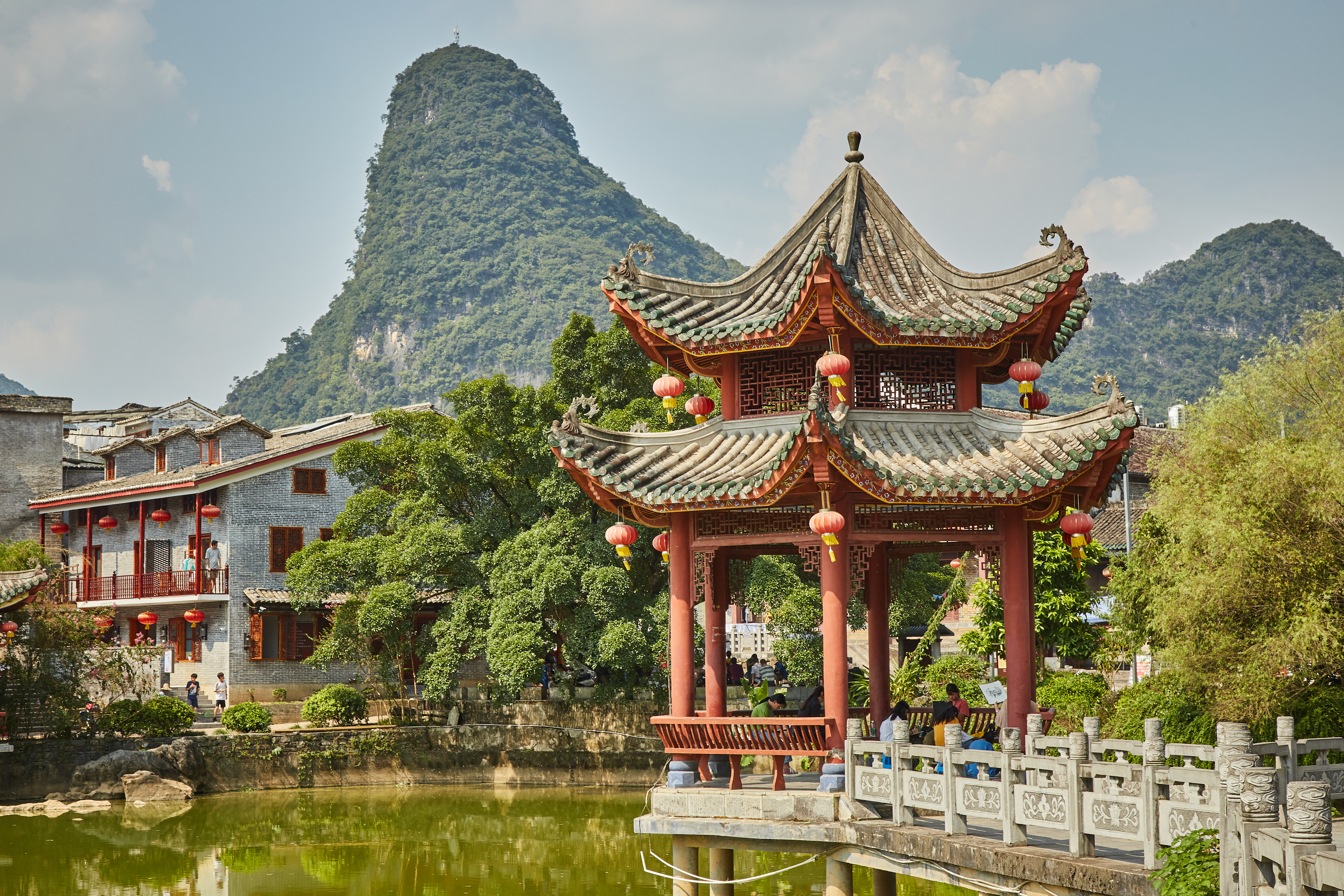
- View from a garden in Huangyao

- Location in Guangxi
- Coordinates: 24°14′52″N 111°12′04″E
- Country: People's Republic of China
- Autonomous region: Guangxi
- Prefecture-level city: Hezhou
- County: Zhaoping County
- Time zone: UTC+8 (China Standard)

Huangyao (Chinese: 黄姚; pinyin: Huángyáo) is a town in Zhaoping County, Guangxi, China. It has a new and an old part of the town; the old town of Huangyao (黄姚古镇) has a history of around a thousand years, and many of its buildings date from the Qing dynasty.

== History ==
It is believed that settlement of the Huangyao area began during the Song dynasty in the Kaibao era (968 – 977) of Emperor Taizu. The name Huangyao was first recorded in the Huangyou era (1049–1053) of Emperor Renzong when general Yang Wenguang passed through Zhaoping to pacify Guangxi, and the place was named after the two most common surnames of the locals living in the area – Huang and Yao.

Huangyao grew into a town during the reign of Wanli Emperor (1572 – 1620) of the Ming dynasty, and it prospered during the reign of Qianlong Emperor (1735 – 1796) in the Qing dynasty. As a result, it has many buildings from the Qing and Ming eras, numbering at over 300. The town was part of a number of administrative divisions throughout its history; today Huangyao includes both an old town and a new district. Many of the buildings in the old town have stayed relatively unchanged in the modern era, and it began to develop as a tourist destination in the late 1990s and early 2000s. It was listed as one of 50 most worthwhile places to visit in China in 2006.

== Description ==
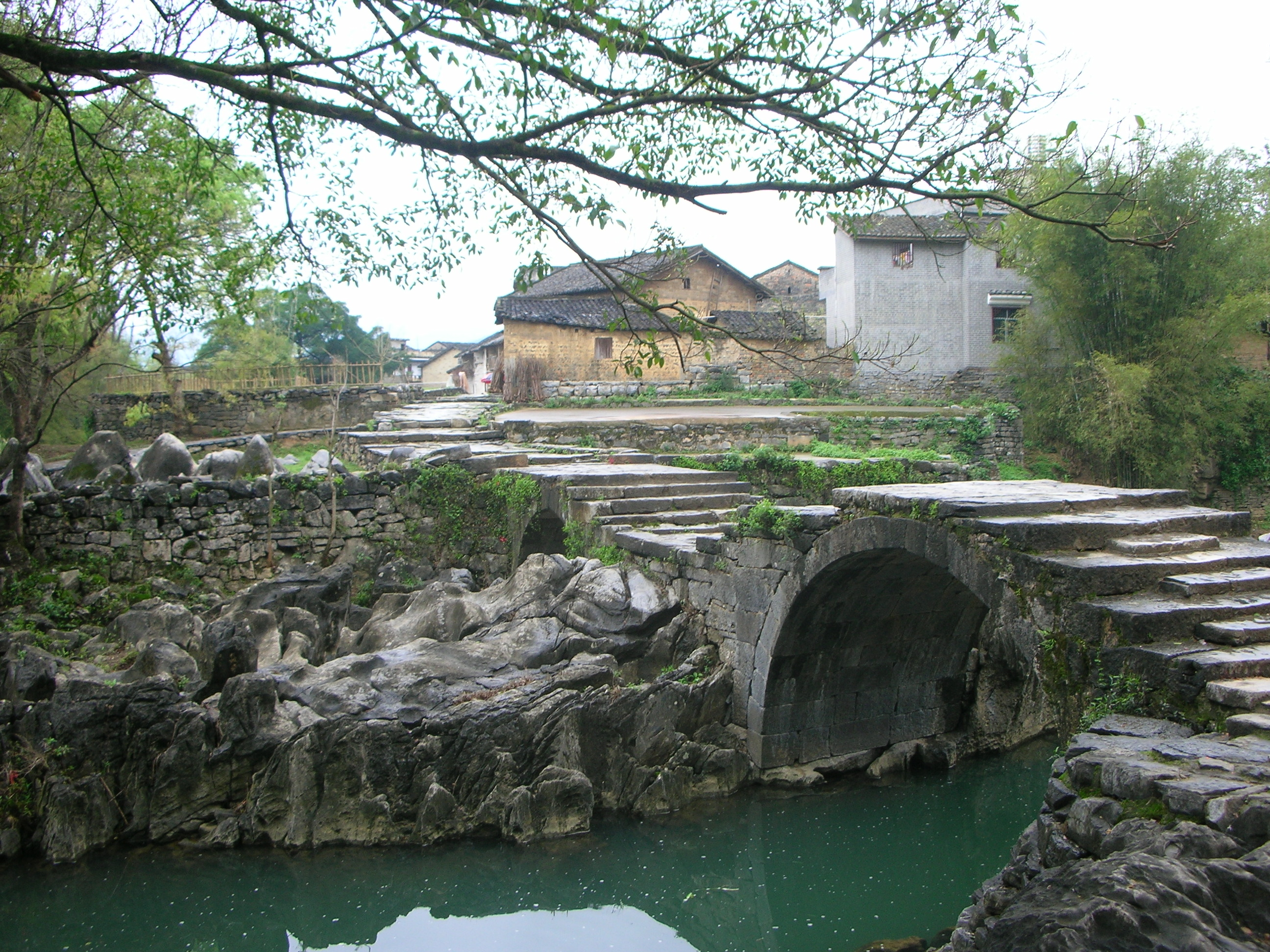
View of Huangyao

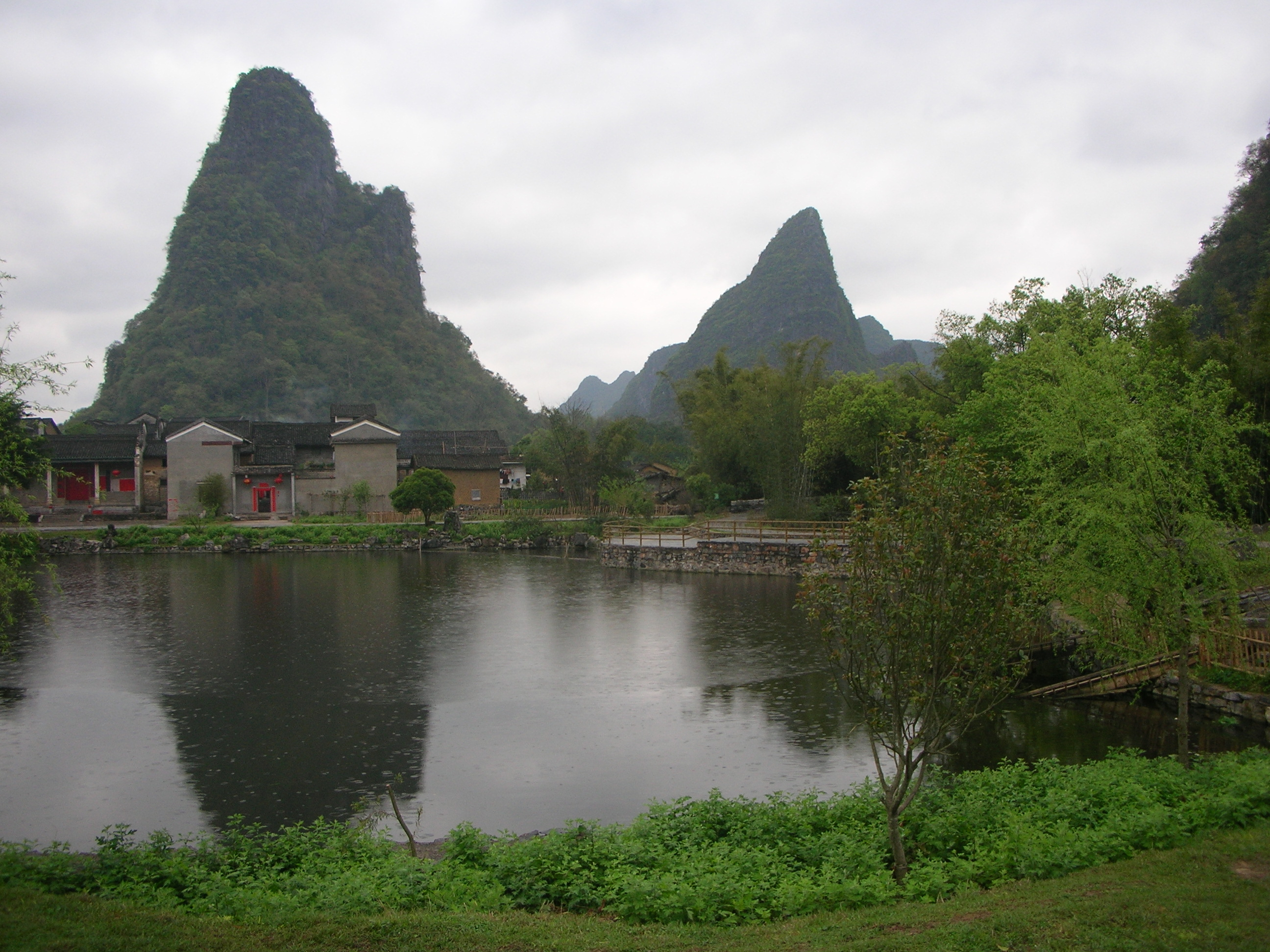
The karst peaks of Huangyao

Huangyao is surrounded by karst peaks and traversed by streams. There are many bridges, and the streets are paved with slate. There are over 30 temples, ancestral halls and pavilions in the old town of Huangyao. Many of the buildings are doubled-storied structures of simple construction in bricks and black tiles.

== Demographics ==
Huangyao has a population of around 50,000, covering an area that included many villages. Most of the people live in the new part of the town, with only around 2,000 remaining in the old town as many have moved into the new district.

== Popular media ==
Because of its picturesque location and old buildings, the old town of Huangyao has been used as a setting for a number of television dramas and films, such as the 2006 film The Painted Veil and the 2001 Chinese television drama Country Spirit.
