= Livadeia =

Town in Boeotia, Greece

Livadeia Λιβαδειά
- Municipality
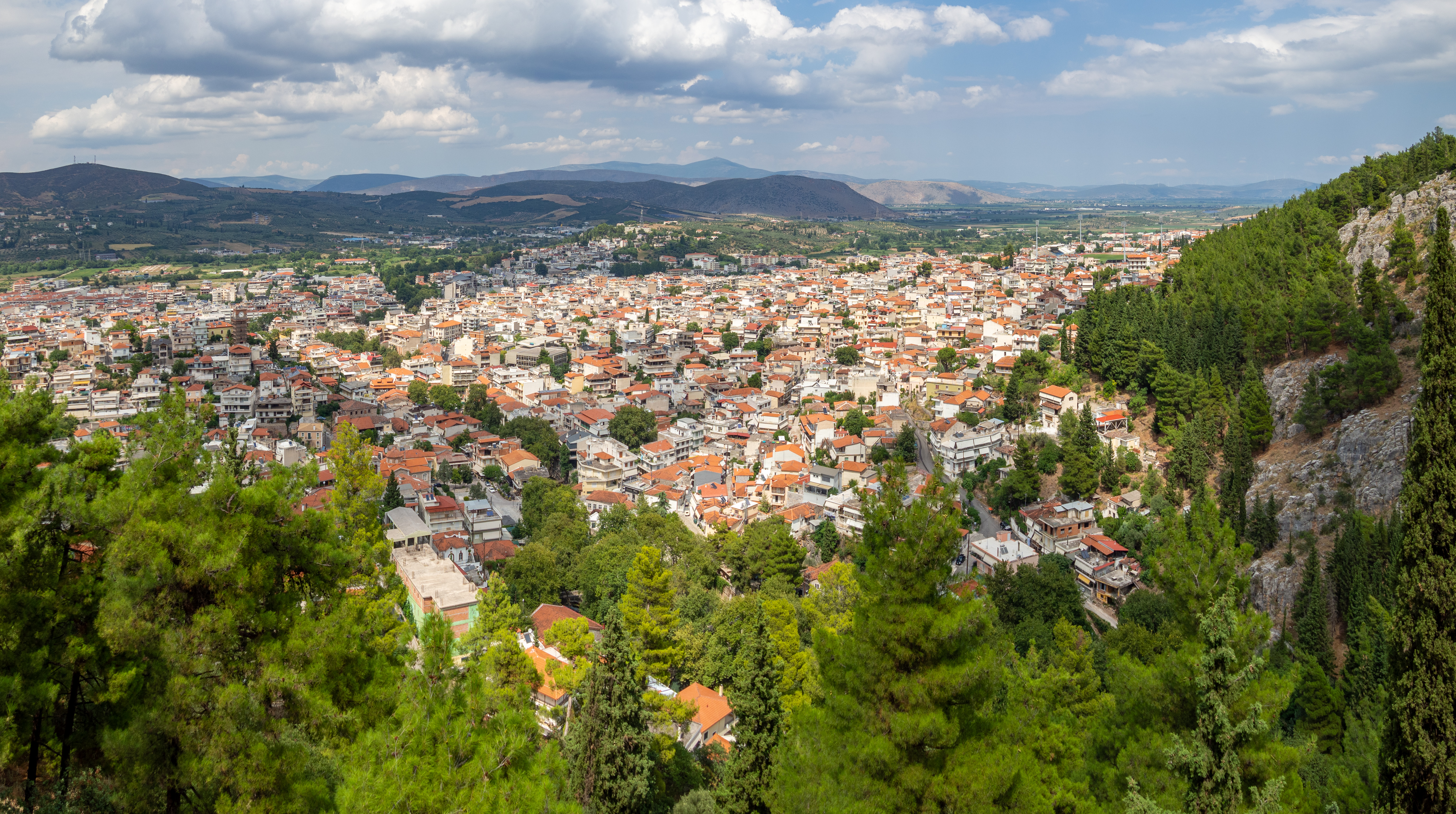
- General view from the castle

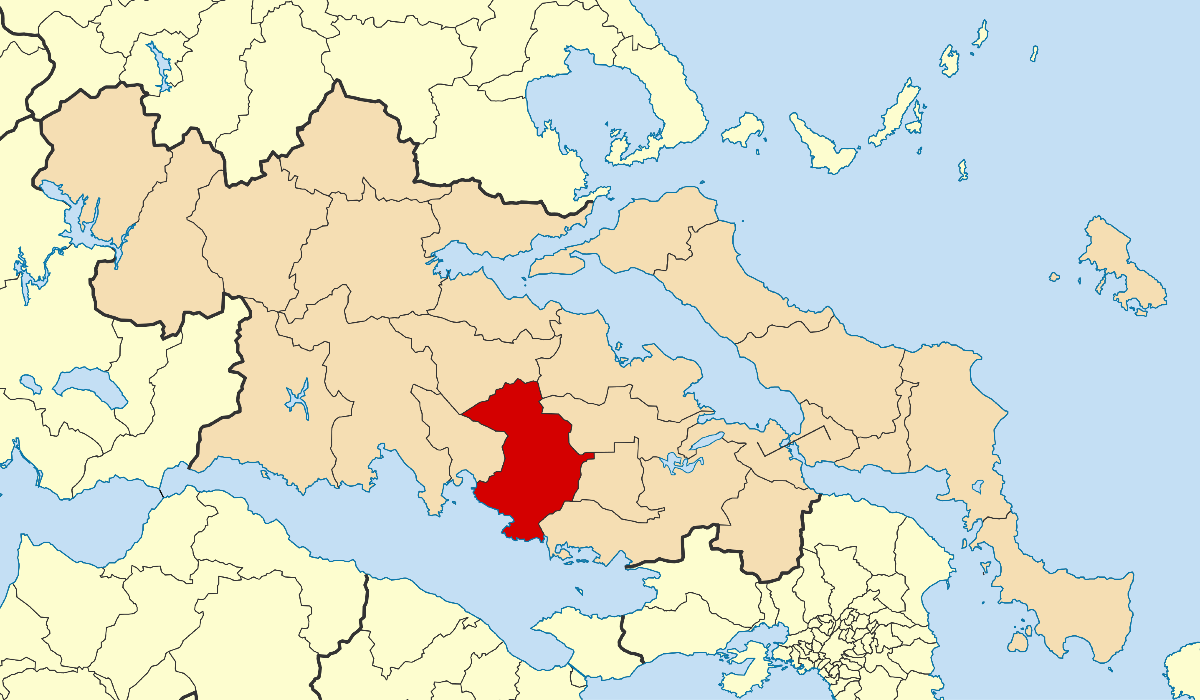

- Location within Greece
- Coordinates: 38°26′N 22°52′E
- Country: Greece
- Administrative region: Central Greece
- Regional unit: Boeotia

Area
  - Municipality: 694.016 km^{2} (267.961 sq mi)
  - Municipal unit: 166.691 km^{2} (64.360 sq mi)
  - Community: 139.614 km^{2} (53.905 sq mi)
- Elevation: 200 m (660 ft)

Population (2021)
  - Municipality: 29,379
  - Density: 42.332/km^{2} (109.64/sq mi)
  - Municipal unit: 22,547
  - Municipal unit density: 135.26/km^{2} (350.33/sq mi)
  - Community: 22,113
  - Community density: 158.39/km^{2} (410.22/sq mi)
- Time zone: UTC+2 (EET)
  - Summer (DST): UTC+3 (EEST)
- Postal code: 321 00
- Area code: 22610
- Vehicle registration: ΒΙ
- Website: www.livadia.gr

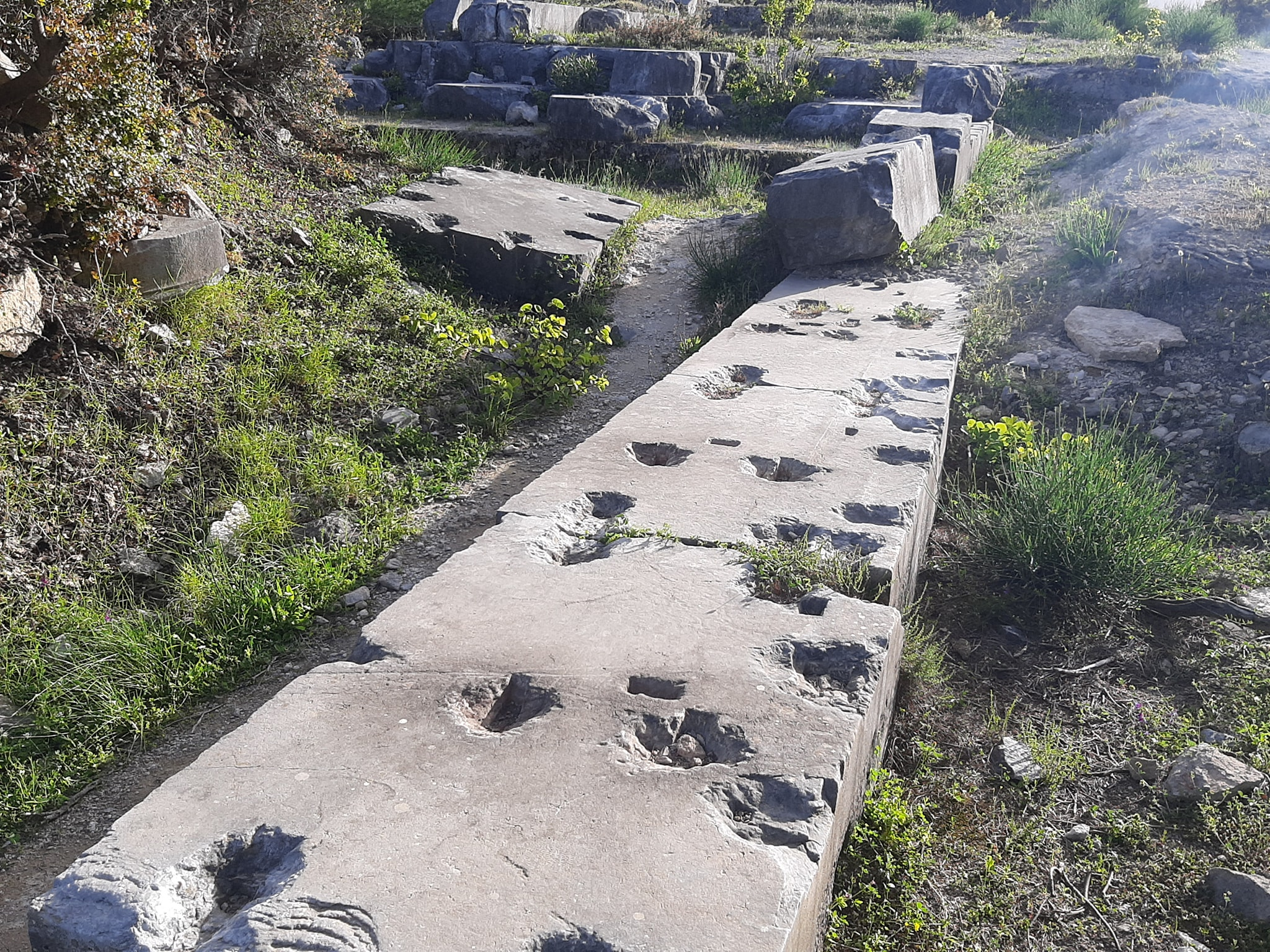
Temple of Zeus Vasileus ("Zeus King") in a cliff of Levadeia.

Livadeia (Greek: Λιβαδειά [livaˈðja]; Ancient Greek: Λεβάδεια [lebádeːa]) is a town in central Greece. It is the capital of the Boeotia regional unit. Livadeia lies 90 km (56 mi) north-west of Athens, 64 km (40 mi) west of Chalkida, 63 km (39 mi) south-east of Lamia, 44 km (27 mi) east-south-east of Amfissa, and 91 km (57 mi) east-north-east of Nafpaktos. The town lies some five kilometres (3.1 miles) west of Greek National Road 3, to which it is linked by National Road 48.

The area around Livadeia is mountainous, with farming activities mainly confined to the valleys. The area has traditionally been associated with the production and processing of cotton and tobacco, as well as the cultivation of cereal crops and the raising of livestock. The city is also known for having participated in the Trojan War in allegiance with Mycenae.

Livadeia is home to Levadiakos F.C., it currently plays in the Greek Super League.

== Geography ==
The municipality of Livadeia covers an area of 694.016 km^{2} (267.961 sq mi), the municipal unit of Livadeia 166.691 km^{2} (64.360 sq mi) and the community 139.614 km^{2} (53.905 sq mi).

== Municipality ==
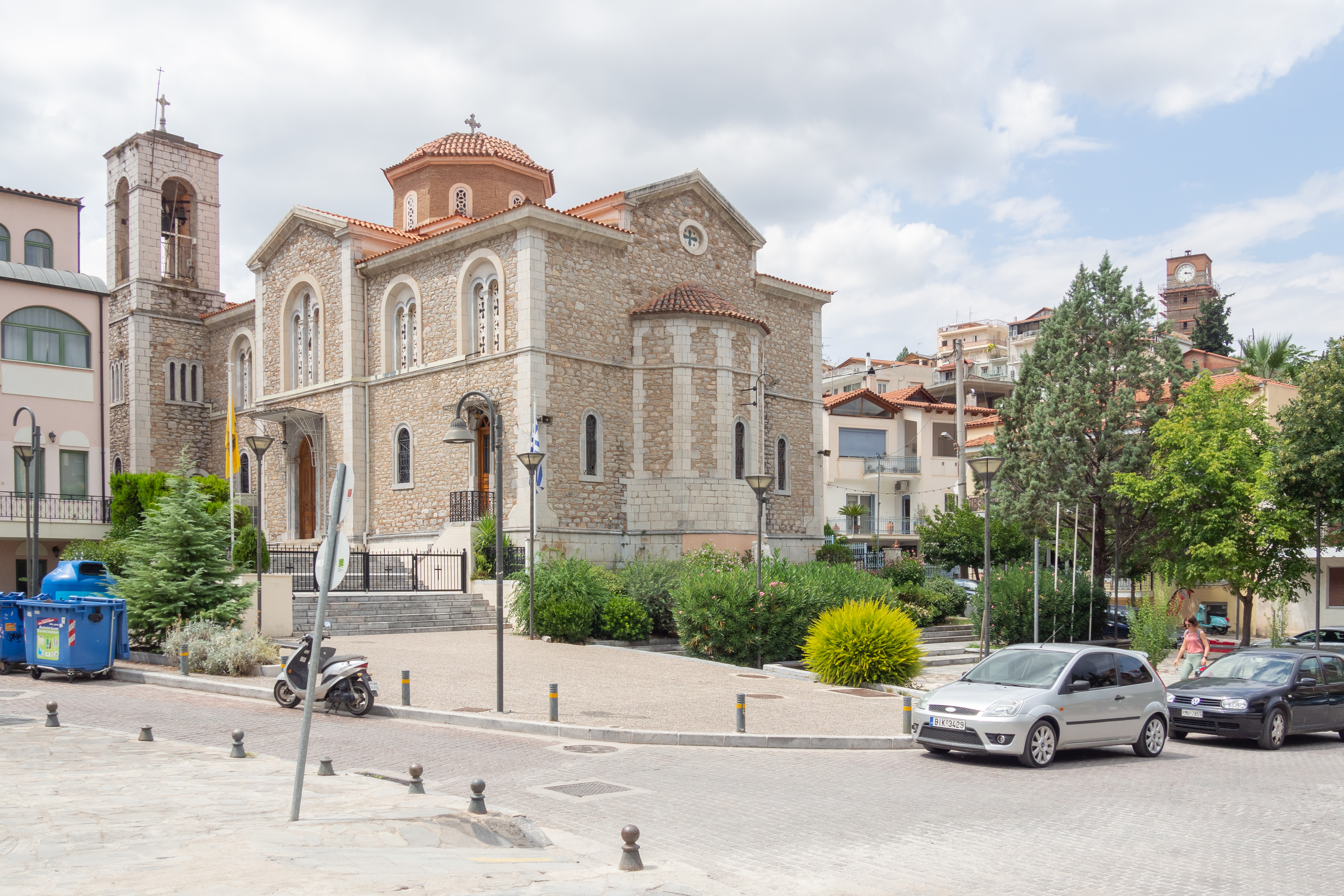
View of the cathedral (Presentation of Mary) of the city, with the clock tower visible in the background, to the right.

The municipality Livadeia was formed at the 2011 local government reform by the merger of the following 5 former municipalities, that became municipal units:

- Chaironeia
- Davleia
- Koroneia
- Kyriaki
- Livadeia

== Historical population ==
Year	Town	Municipal unit	Municipality
1991	23,295	-	28,110
2001	24,061	24,769	29,995
2011	26,193	26,779	31,315
2021	22,113	22,547	29,379

A notable portion of the inhabitants of Livadeia are Arvanites.

== History ==
In antiquity, Lebadeia was a town near the western frontier of ancient Boeotia, described by Strabo as lying between Mount Helicon and Chaeroneia. The ancient town was situated at the foot of a precipitous height, which is an abrupt northerly termination of Mt. Helicon. Pausanias relates that this height was originally occupied by the Homeric city of Mideia, from where the inhabitants, under the conduct of Lebadus, an Athenian, migrated into the plain, and founded there the city named after him. On the other hand, Strabo maintains that the Homeric cities Arne and Mideia were both swallowed up by Lake Copais.

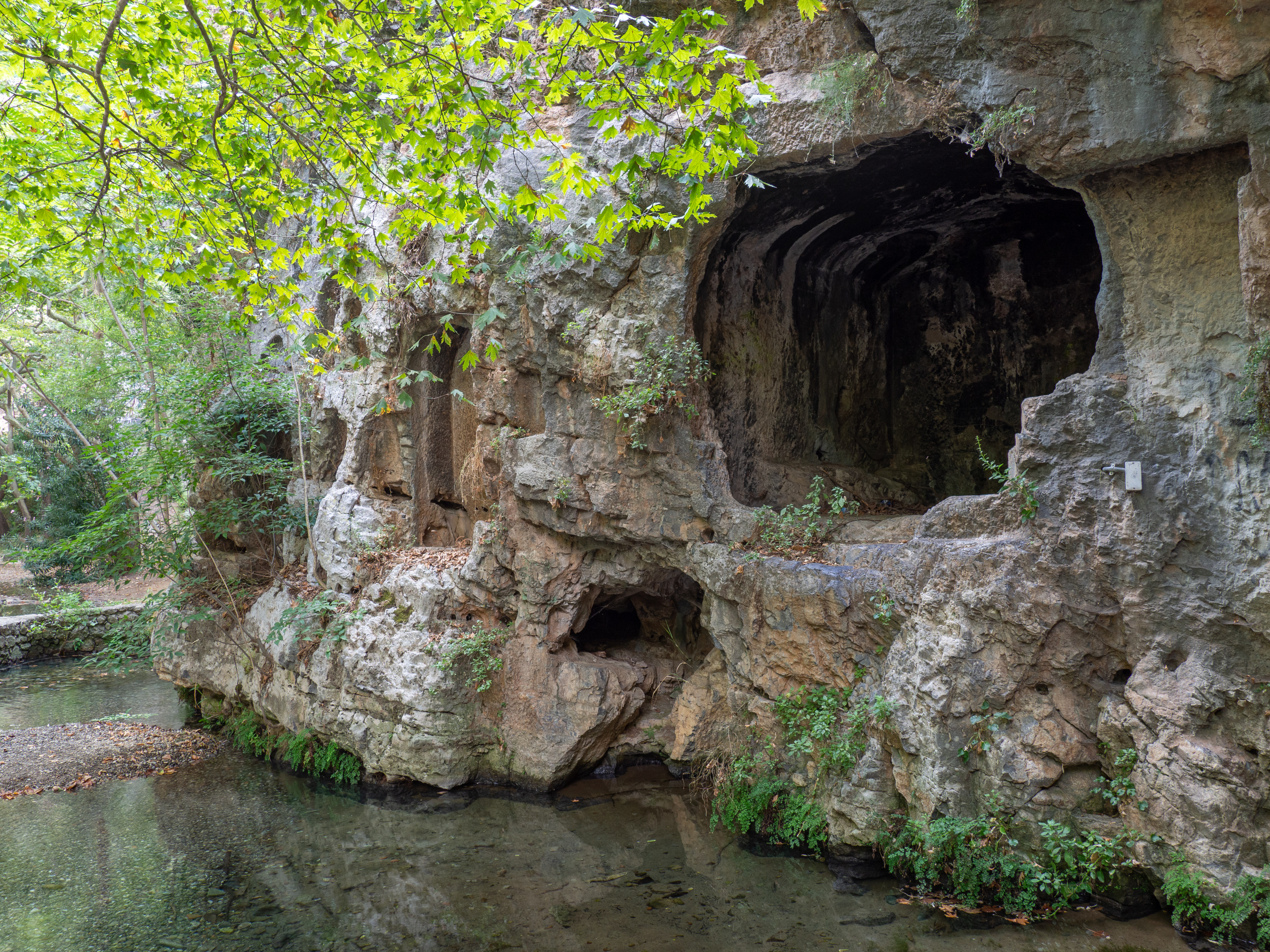
The Oracle of Trophonius

Lebadeia was originally an insignificant place, but it rose into importance in consequence of its possessing the celebrated oracle of Trophonius. The oracle was consulted both by Croesus and by Mardonius, and it continued to be consulted even in the time of Plutarch, when all the other oracles in Boeotia had become dumb. Pausanias himself consulted the oracle, and he speaks of the town in terms which show that it was in his time the most flourishing place in Boeotia. Notwithstanding the sanctity of the oracle, Lebadeia did not always escape the ravages of war. It was taken and plundered both by Lysander and by Archelaus, the general of Mithridates VI of Pontus. In the war against Perseus of Macedon, it espoused the side of the Romans, while Thebes, Haliartus, and Coroneia declared in favour of the Macedonian king.

When Pausanias visited Lebadeia in the 2nd century, he recorded numerous temples. The most remarkable object in the grove of Trophonius was the temple of the hero, containing his statue by Praxiteles, resembling a statue of Asclepius; a temple of Demeter, surnamed Europe; a statue of Zeus Hyetius (Pluvius) in the open air; and higher up, upon the mountain, the oracle (τὸ μαντεῖον). Still higher up was the hunting place of Persephone; a large unfinished temple of Zeus Basileus, a temple of Apollo, and another temple, containing statues of Cronus, Zeus, and Hera. Pausanias likewise mentions a chapel of the Good Daemon and of Good Fortune, where those who were going to consult the oracle first passed a certain number of days.

During the Byzantine period, Livadeia entered a period of decline, except for the 9th century, when some economic growth occurred. During the Frankish period Livadeia came back on track, then in the 14th century it came under the control of the Catalan Company. The Ottoman domination began in 1458, when economic and administrative privileges granted to residents contribute to industry and trade. The city broke free of the Ottomans as a result of the Greek War of Independence in the 1820s.

== Antiquities ==
Pausanias, writing in the 2nd century AD, reported that the original name of the city was Mideia, and that it took its name Lebadeia from Lebados of Athens, who moved the city from high to low ground, to its current location on the banks of the Herkyna river. The sacred protector of the city was the hero/god Trophonios, whose oracle, involving a harrowing descent into an underground chamber, was famous beyond the borders of Greece. At the springs of the Herkyna river are shallow grottos with niches and marble remnants said to be the site of the oracle. On the hill above is a small medieval castle, mostly the work of the Catalan Company during the 14th century, accessible by foot. This is one of only four Catalan castles in Greece.

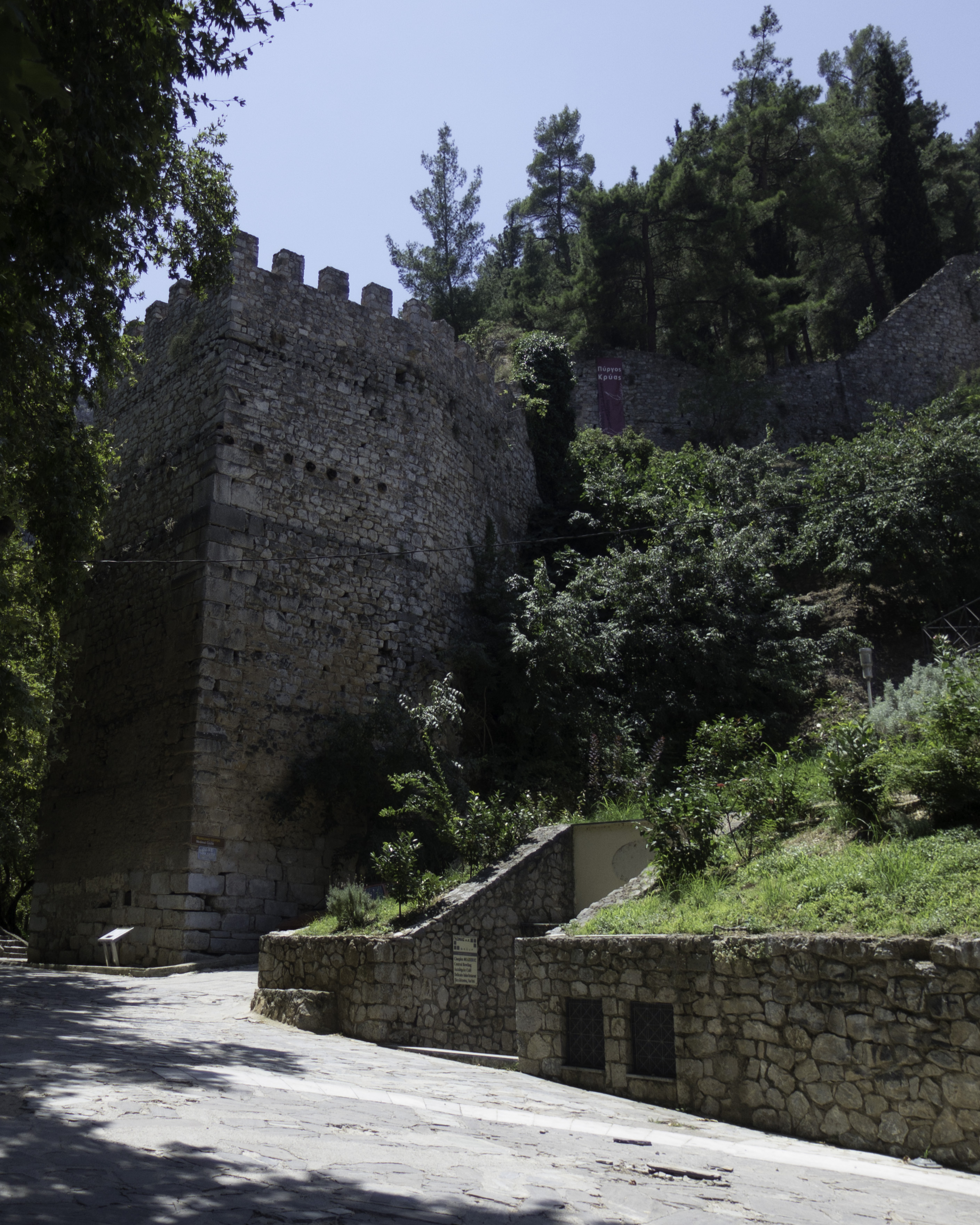
Livadeia castle wall from the side of the Herkyna river

Further west, commanding a dramatic view from the hill of Profitis Ilias, are the remains of a large temple of Zeus Basileus, perhaps begun in the 3rd century BC but never completed. The cathedral church of St. George houses an important relic, a head of St. George, translated to Venice in the 15th century but restored to Livadeia as a gesture of interfaith cooperation in 1999. In medieval times the river was lined by a series of water mills, one of which is preserved.

== Transport ==
The closest railway station is Livadeia, about 5 km from the city center.

== Sports ==
Livadeia hosts two sports club with presence in the higher national divisions, Levadiakos F.C. a football club and Livadeia B.C. (A.E. Livadeias) a basketball club.

Sport clubs based in Livadeia
Club	Founded	Sports	Achievements
Levadiakos F.C.	1961	Football	Presence in Super League
Livadeia B.C.	1994	Basketball	Presence in A2 Ethniki

== Notable people ==
- Antonios Georgantas, revolutionary and politician
- Kostas Hatzis, musician
- Dimitrios Ioannou, military officer
- Lambros Katsonis, revolutionary
- Petros Kokkalis, medical doctor and politician
- Panos Koutrouboussis, writer and artist
- Mary Tsoni, actress and musician

== Sister cities ==
- (Ukraine) Livadiya, Crimea

== Gallery ==
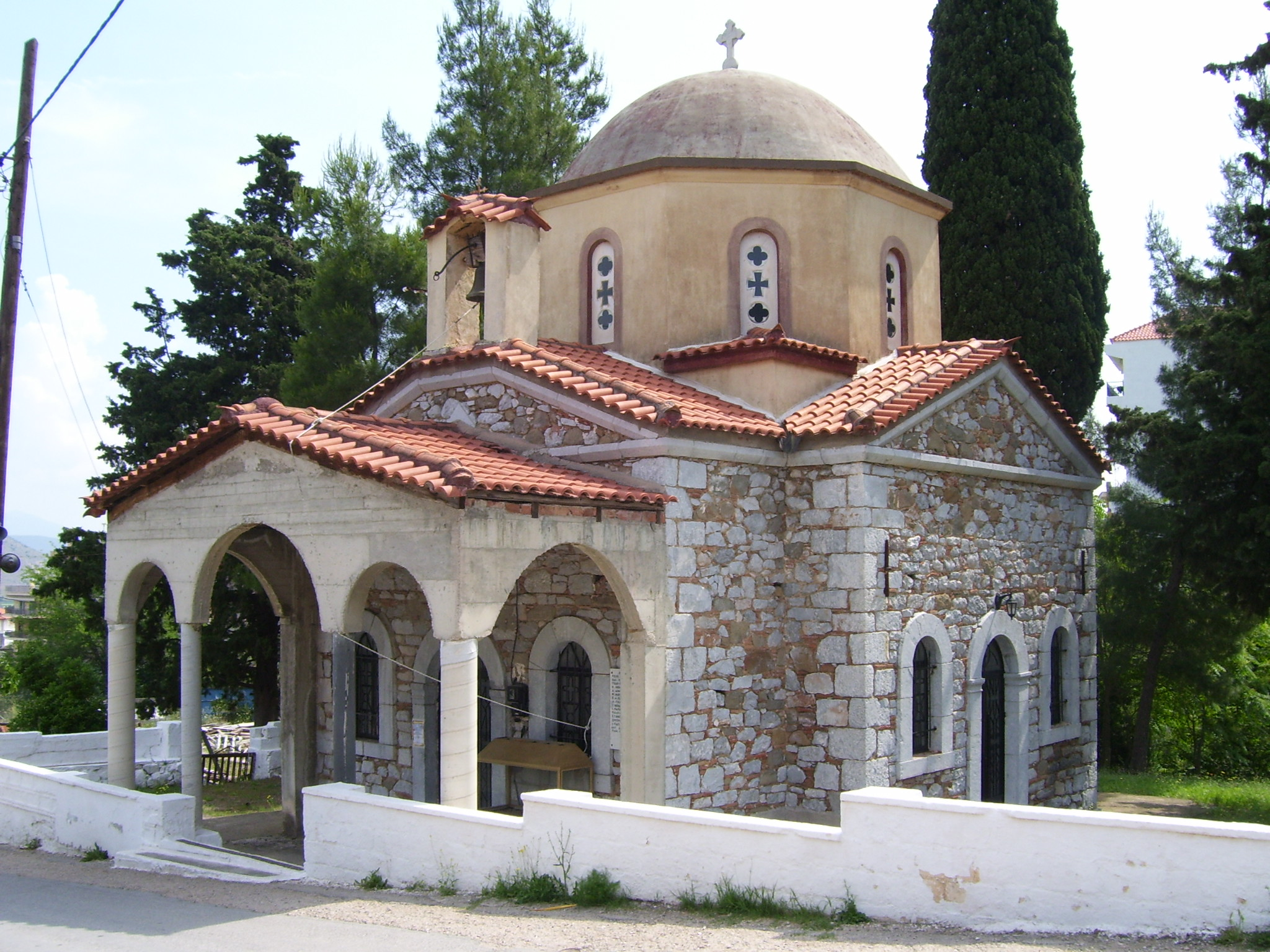
St Meletios church

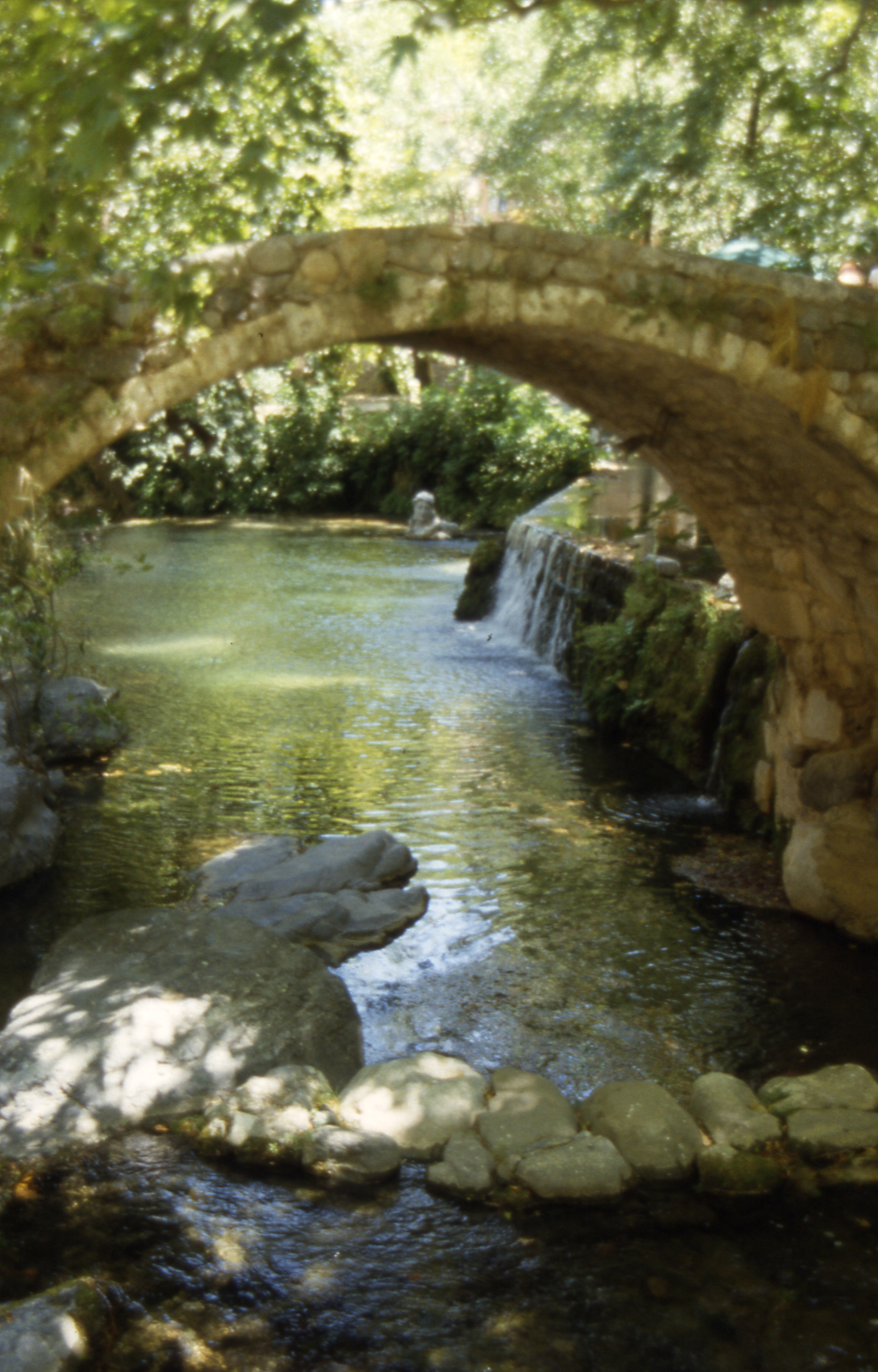
Herkyna river

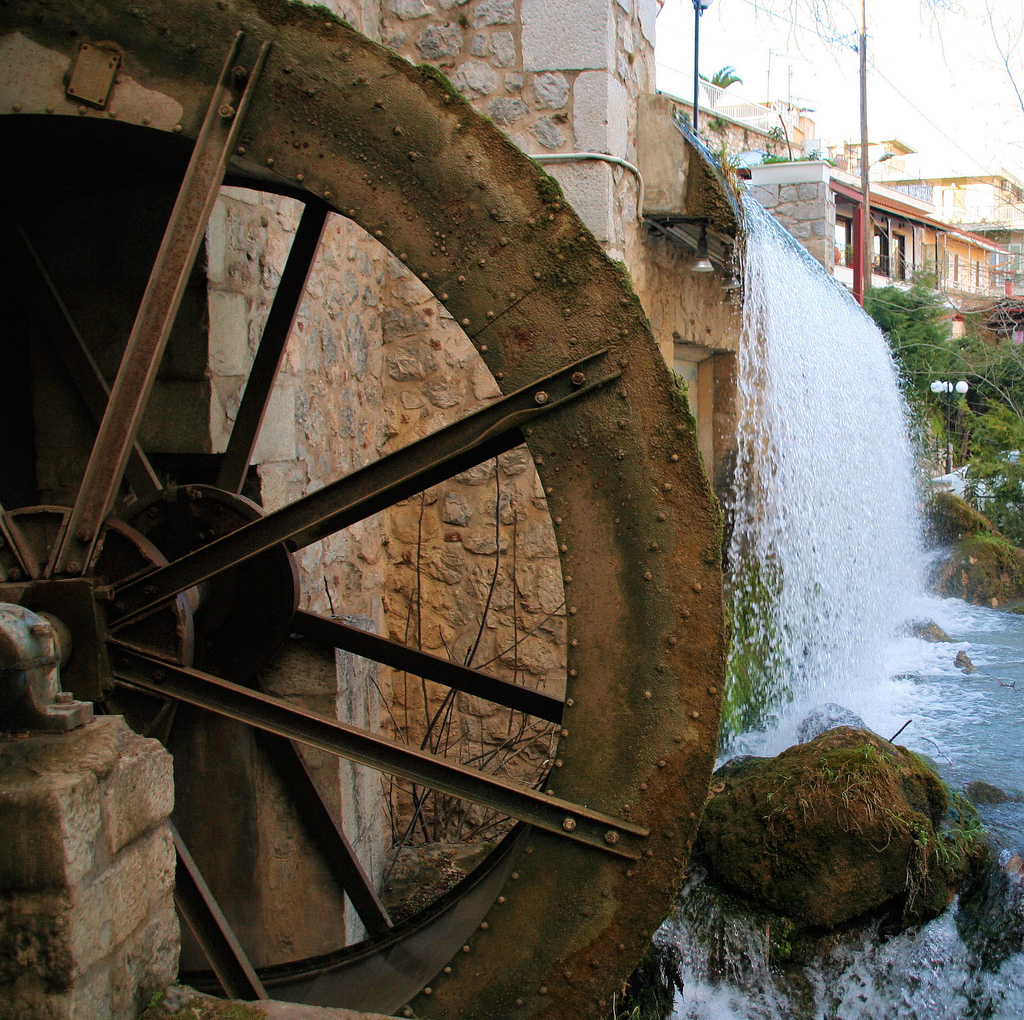
Old watermill at Herkyna river

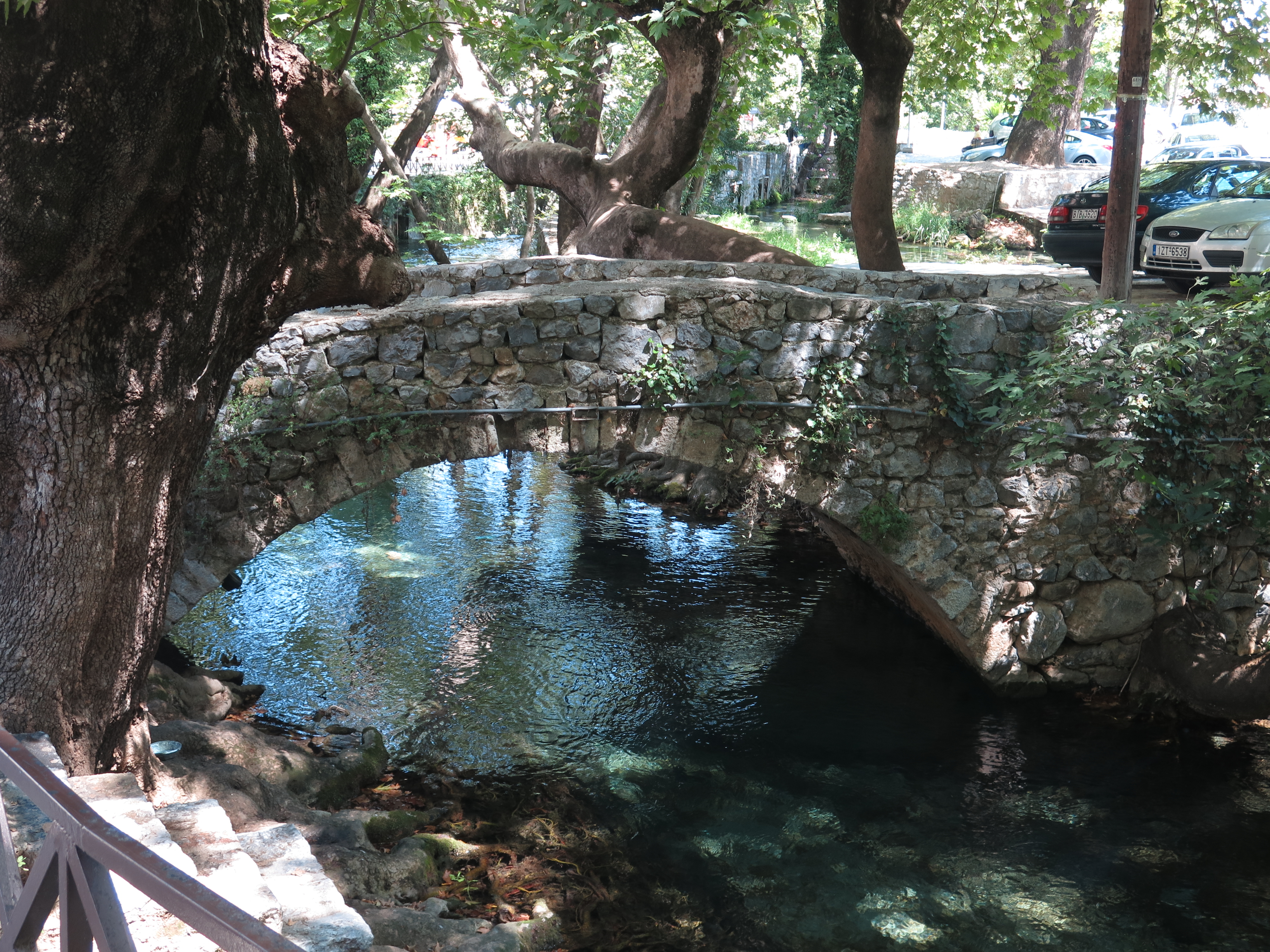
Stone bridge over Herkyna river in Livadeia

== See also ==
- University of Central Greece
- Livadiya, Crimea
