= Oymasha oil field =

Oil field in Mangystau Region, Kazakhstan

Coordinates: 43.5873231°N 51.8422937°E

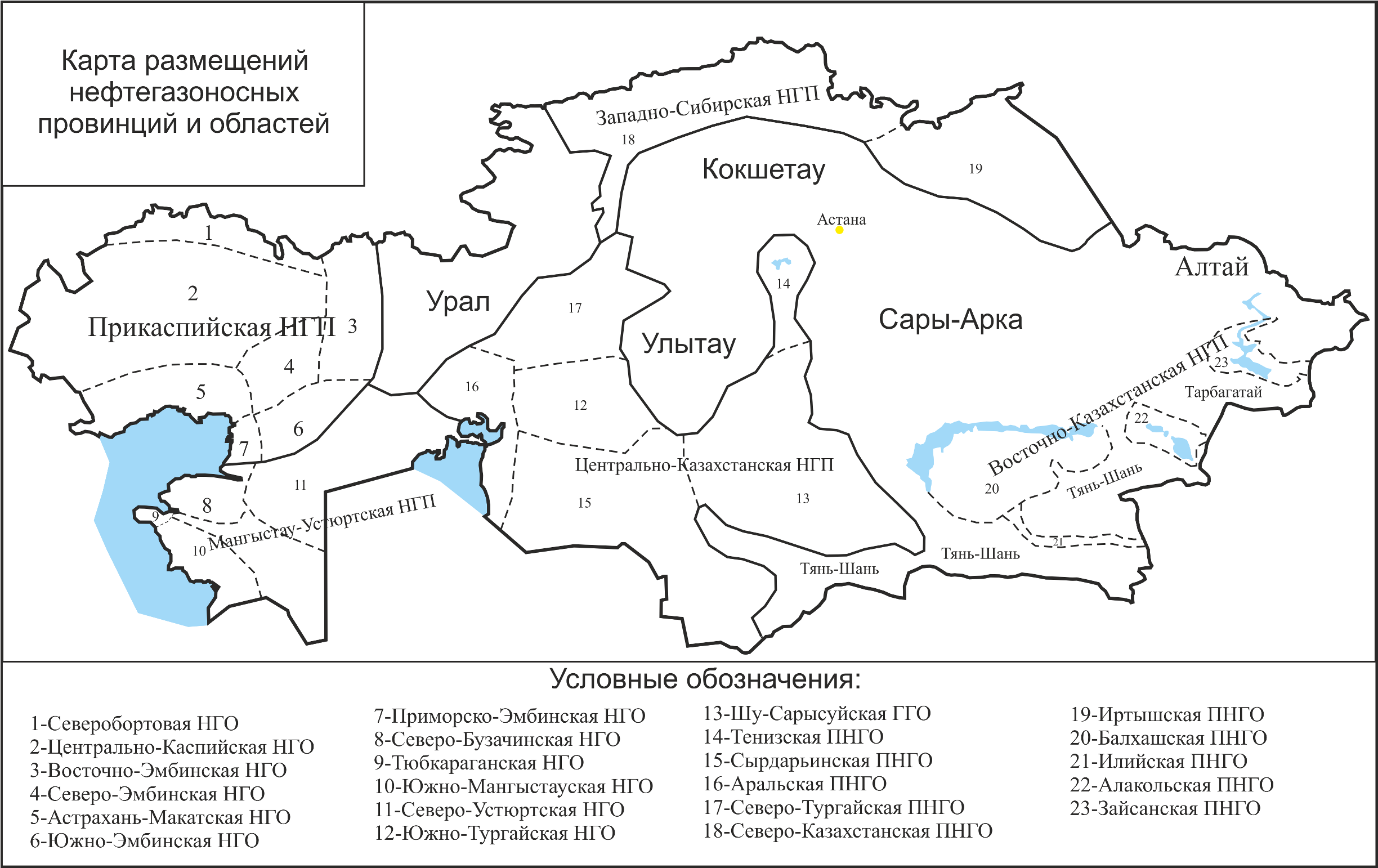
Oil in Kazakhstan; South Mangyshlak is '10'

Oymasha or Oimasha (Kazakh: Оймаша) is an oil field in Mangystau Region, Kazakhstan, on the Mangyshlak Peninsula, 50km southeast of Aktau. Discovered in 1980, it is part of the South Mangyshlak oil and gas basin. The deposits are at depths 3.1–3.7 km.

It is being developed by the company Mangystaumunaygaz. In 2009, the 100% of the stock of the company was purchased, in equal shares, by Kazakh КазМунайГаз and China National Petroleum Corporation. The license was obtained in June 1996, (contract №ГКИ-170 from January 9, 1998 for 25 years). In 2022 an additional agreement extended the license (for Oymasha, South Zhetybay, and Alatobe oil fields) until December 8, 2028.
