= Kuryk =

Kuryk Qūryq (Kazakh)
- Location in Kazakhstan
- Coordinates: 43°12′N 51°39′E
- Country: Kazakhstan
- Region: Mangystau Region
- Elevation: −21 m (−69 ft)

Population (2009)
  - Total: 8,118
- Time zone: UTC+5 (UTC+5)
- Postal code: 130300
- Area code: +7 2937
- Vehicle registration: 12, R
- Climate: BWk

Kuryk (Kazakh: Құрық, Qūryq) is a selo and the administrative center of Karakiya District in Mangystau Region in western Kazakhstan.

== History ==
The settlement which was founded in the 19th century was known as Yeraliev (Ералиев) until 1993. In 1962, it became the administrative center of Karakiya District.

Kuryk is being developed as a port to export crude oil from the Kashagan oil field across the Caspian Sea to Baku, where the Baku–Tbilisi–Ceyhan pipeline will transport it to Turkey.
