= Karakiya District =

Coordinates: 43°12′N 51°39′E

Karakiya Qaraqia audany (Kazakh)
- District
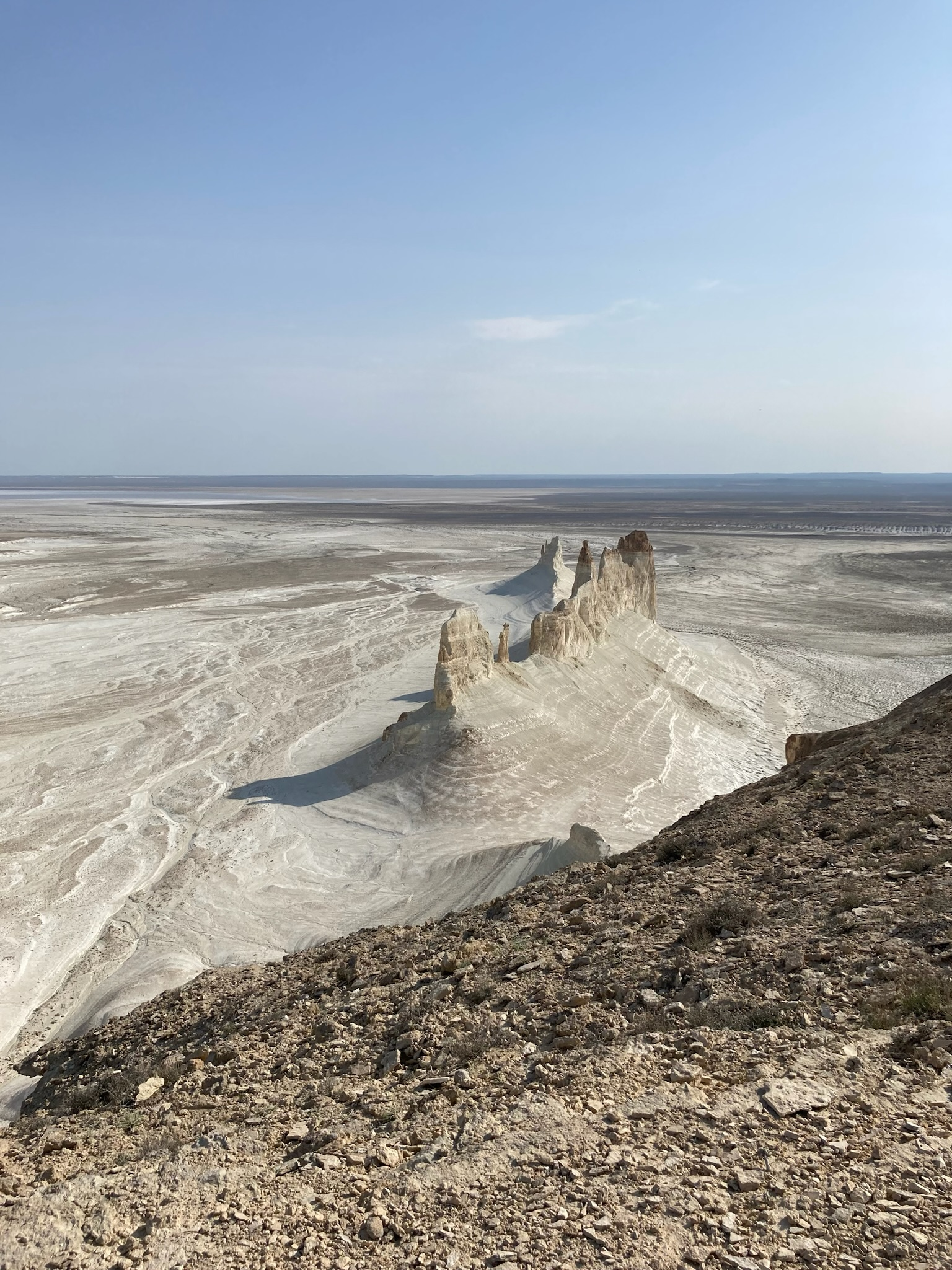
- A natural rock formation in Karakiya District

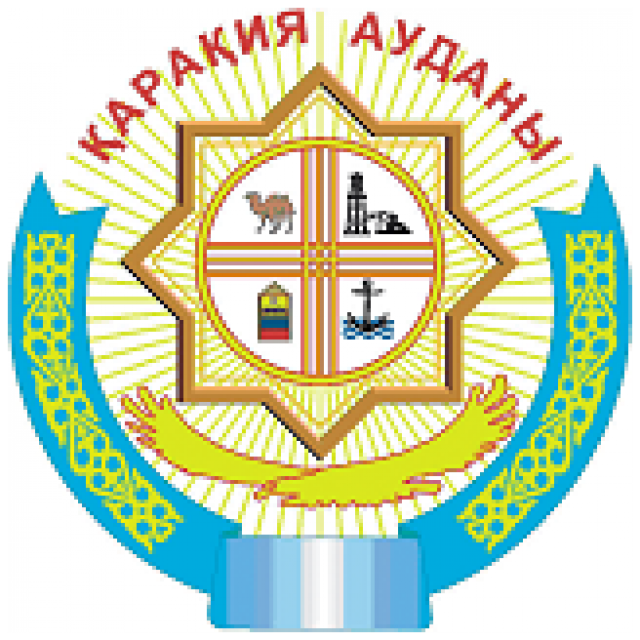
- Seal

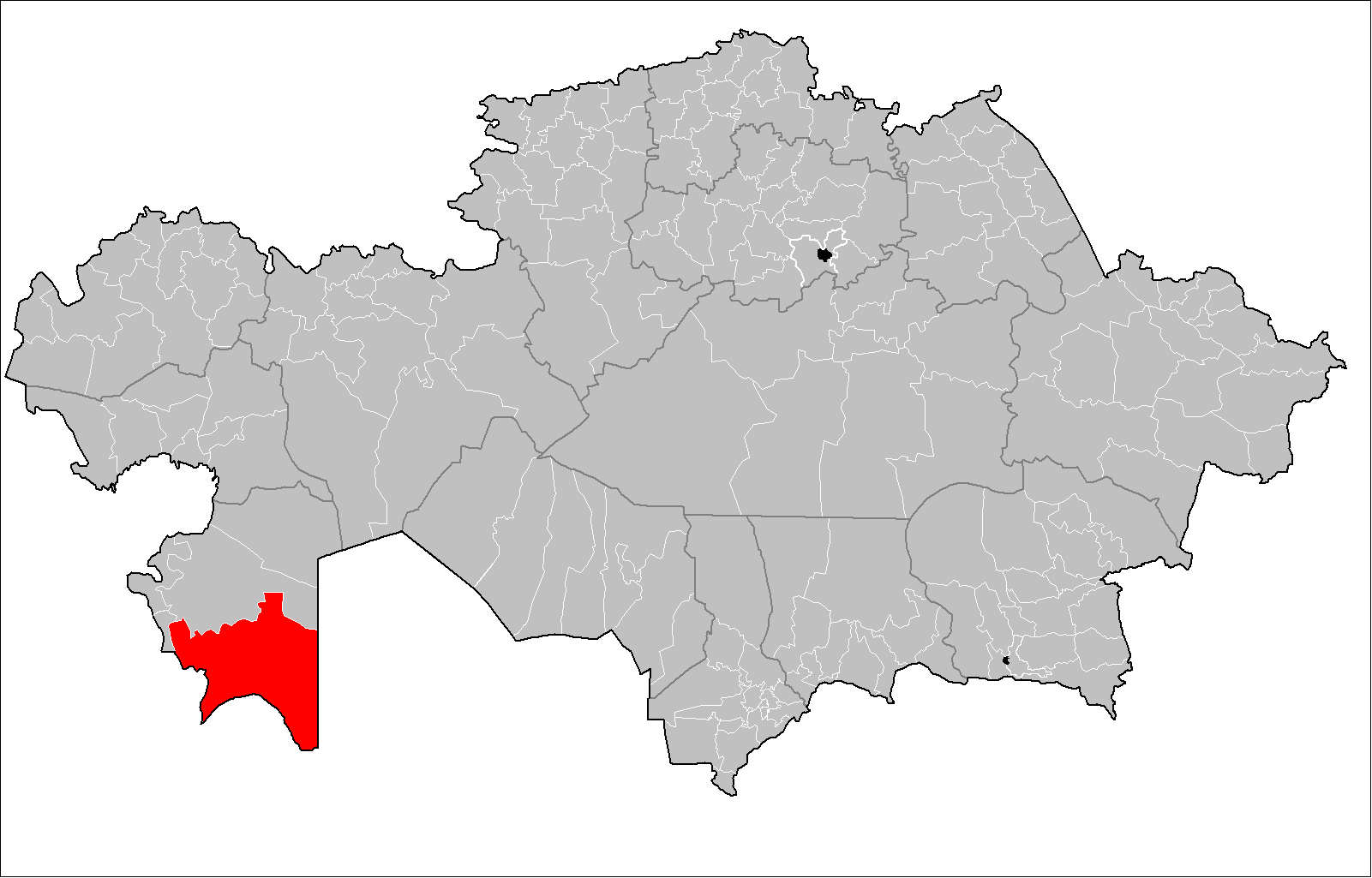
- Country: Kazakhstan
- Region: Mangystau Region
- Administrative center: Kuryk

Government
  - Akim: Simbat Toretayev

Population (2013)
  - Total: 32,304
- Time zone: UTC+5 (West)

Karakiya District (Kazakh: Қарақия ауданы, romanized: Qaraqia audany) is a district of Mangystau Region in southwestern Kazakhstan. The district was indeed founded in 1973 as Yeraliev District to honor Shabden Yeraliev (1898-1928), an influential Kazakh Soviet political figure, before it was later renamed to Karakiya District in 1993. The administrative center of the district is the selo of Kuryk. Population: 32,304 (2013 estimate); 29,579 (2009 census results); 23,437 (1999 census results).
