= Race Across the World series 4 =

Fourth series of Race Across the World

Race Across the World
- Series 4
- Presented by: John Hannah (narrator)
- No. of days: 50–51
- No. of contestants: 10
- Winners: Alfie Watts and Owen Wood
- No. of legs: 8
- Distance traveled: 15,000 km (9,300 mi)
- No. of episodes: 9

Release
- Original network: BBC One
- Original release: 10 April – 29 May 2024

Season chronology
- ← Previous; Series 3 Next → Series 5

The fourth series of Race Across the World began airing on 10 April 2024. Each two-person team was required to complete the 15,000 kilometres (9,300 mi) route from Japan to Indonesia without using air travel, and was given a budget equal to the cost of the air fare. Contestants were provided with only a map, travel guide and GPS tracker.

Start and end points
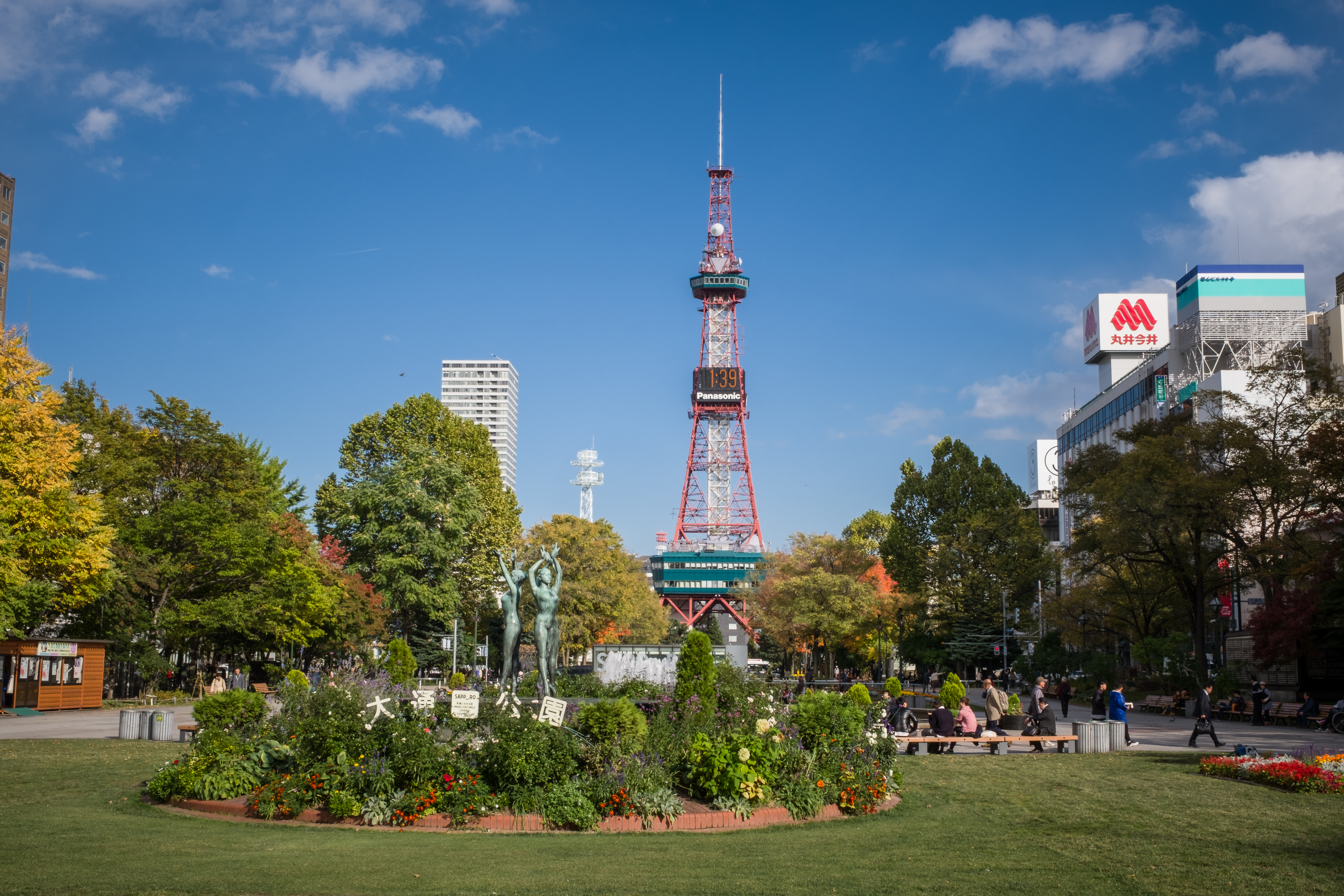
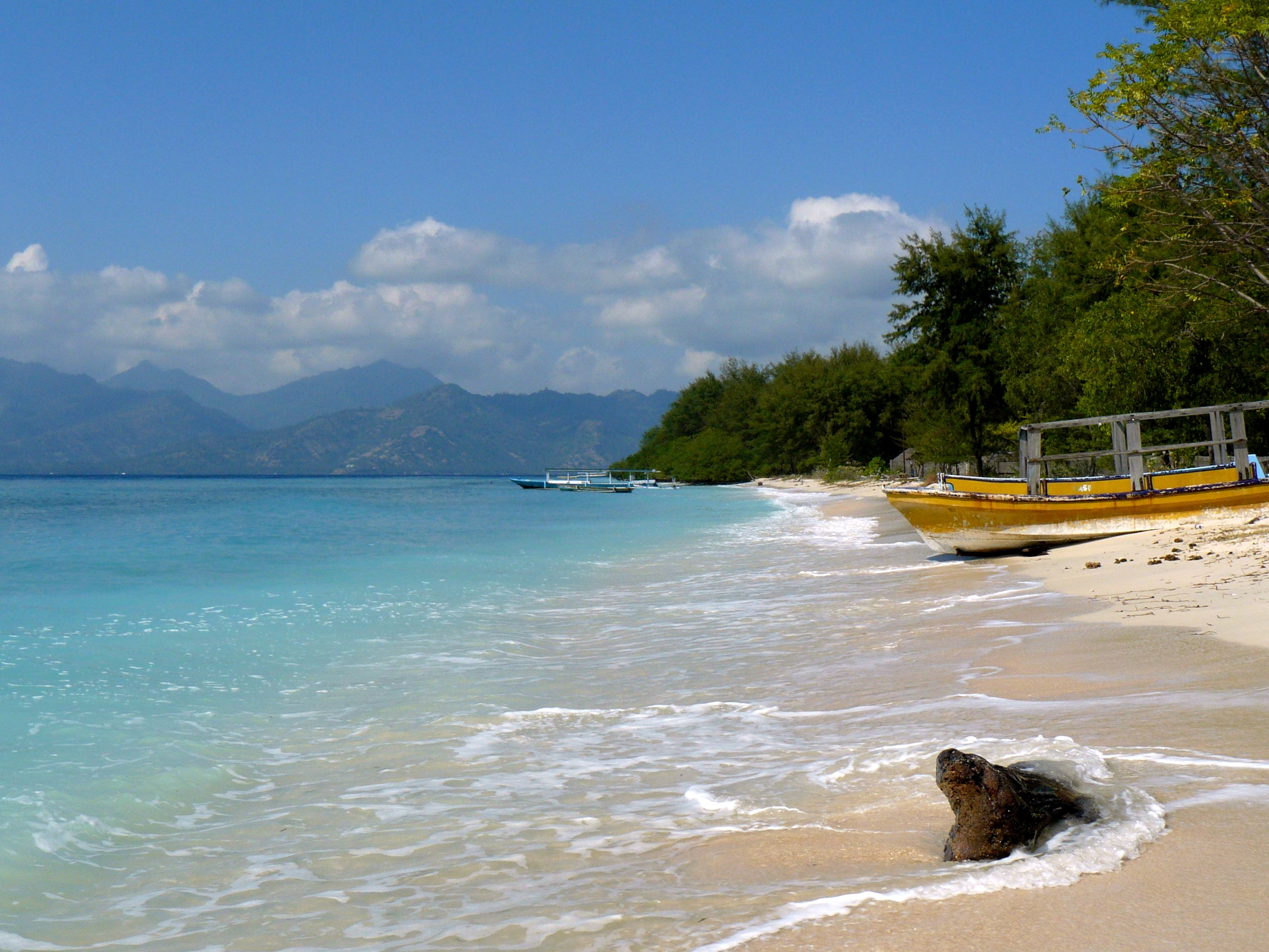
Sapporo, Japan (top) and Gili Meno, Indonesia (bottom)

On 27 March 2024, the BBC announced that the fourth series of Race Across the World would begin airing on 10 April. The five pairs of competitors are Brydie and Sharon, Alfie and Owen, Stephen and Viv, Eugenie and Isabel, and Betty and James.

== Overview ==
The fourth series of Race Across the World was a race over 15,000 kilometres (9,300 mi) that took place entirely in Eastern Asia, commencing in Sapporo on the island of Hokkaido in Japan and finishing on the island of Gili Meno off Lombok in the Indonesian archipelago of Lesser Sunda. Although the contestants were not allowed to fly in the race, in this series, contestants were flown from Korea to Vietnam, skipping over China. The production company said that China was omitted during the planning stage due to "time constraints and difficulties in travel in the aftermath of the global pandemic", so a flight was organised from Seoul to Hanoi.

The race had seven checkpoints with enforced rest periods, with contestants only finding out the next destination on departure from a checkpoint. The first team to arrive at the final checkpoint won £20,000.

Teams were given a budget of £1,390 per person – the equivalent air fare for travelling the race route. Contestants were not permitted to subsidise their budgets, but short-term opportunities allowed them to work for money or bed and board. Contestants were not given access to telephones or internet.

== Contestants ==
Name	Relationship	Occupation	Age	From	Ref.
Sharon Bailey	Mother and daughter	Cleaner	52	Kent	
Brydie Bailey	Mother and daughter	Snowboarding instructor	25	Kent	
Eugenie	Mother and daughter	Teacher	61	Barking	
Isabel	Mother and daughter	Trainee clinical scientist	25	Birmingham	
Alfie Watts	Lifelong friends	Football referee	20	St Albans	
Owen Wood	Lifelong friends	Trainee pilot	20	St Albans	
Stephen Redding	Husband and wife	Retired	61	Rutland	
Viv Redding	Husband and wife	Retired	65	Rutland	
James Mukherjee	Brother and sister	Sales Consultant	21	Gargrave	
Betty Mukherjee	Brother and sister	Social Media and Events Manager	25	Silsden	

== Results summary ==
Colour key:

– Team withdrawn
– Team eliminated
– Series winners

Teams	Position (by leg)							
Teams	1	2	3	4	5	6	7	8
Alfie & Owen	2nd	2nd	1st	4th	3rd	1st	1st	Winners
Eugenie & Isabel	1st	1st	2nd	2nd	4th	3rd	2nd	2nd
Betty & James	3rd	3rd	3rd	3rd	1st	4th	3rd	3rd
Stephen & Viv	4th	4th	4th	1st	2nd	2nd	4th	4th
Brydie & Sharon	5th	5th	5th					

== Route ==
The checkpoints in the fourth series were:

Leg	From	To
1	Sapporo TV Tower; Sapporo, Japan	Nara Hotel; Nara, Japan
2	Nara Hotel; Nara, Japan	Dominiclava Sokcho; Sokcho, South Korea
3	Noi Bai International Airport; Hanoi, Vietnam	Sokha Hotel; Phnom Penh, Cambodia
4	Sokha Hotel; Phnom Penh, Cambodia	Hotel Riverview; Mae Sariang, Thailand
5	Hotel Riverview; Mae Sariang, Thailand	Phi Phi The Beach Resort; Koh Phi Phi, Thailand
6	Phi Phi The Beach Resort; Koh Phi Phi, Thailand	Padi Ecolodge; Bukittinggi, Indonesia
7	Padi Ecolodge; Bukittinggi, Indonesia	The Orient Jakarta; Jakarta, Indonesia
8	The Orient Jakarta; Jakarta, Indonesia	Seri Resort; Gili Meno, Indonesia

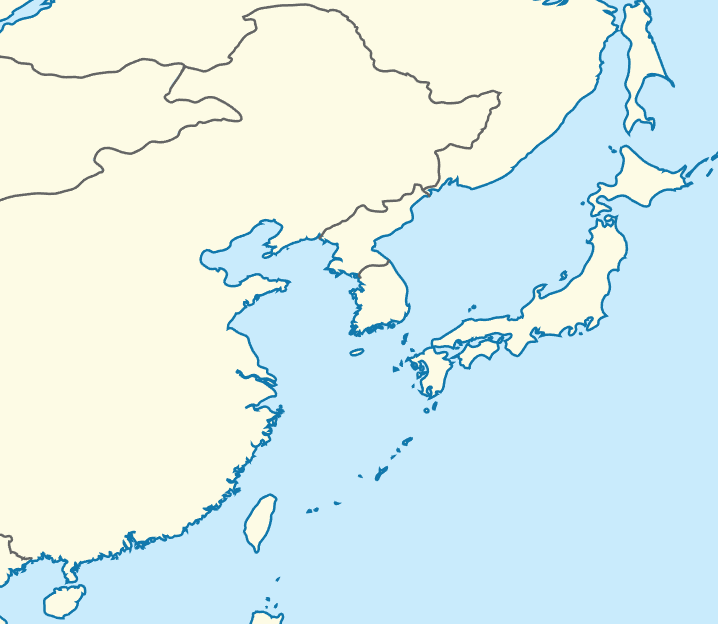
Checkpoints on Series 4: Checkpoint, Start, Finish
Checkpoints on Series 4: Checkpoint, Start, Resume, Finish

== Race summary ==
Mode of transportation	Rail Ship Bus/coach Taxi Road vehicle Self-drive vehicle (paid) RV
Activity	Working for money and/or bed and board Excursion that cost time and/or money

=== Leg 1: Sapporo, Japan → Nara, Japan ===
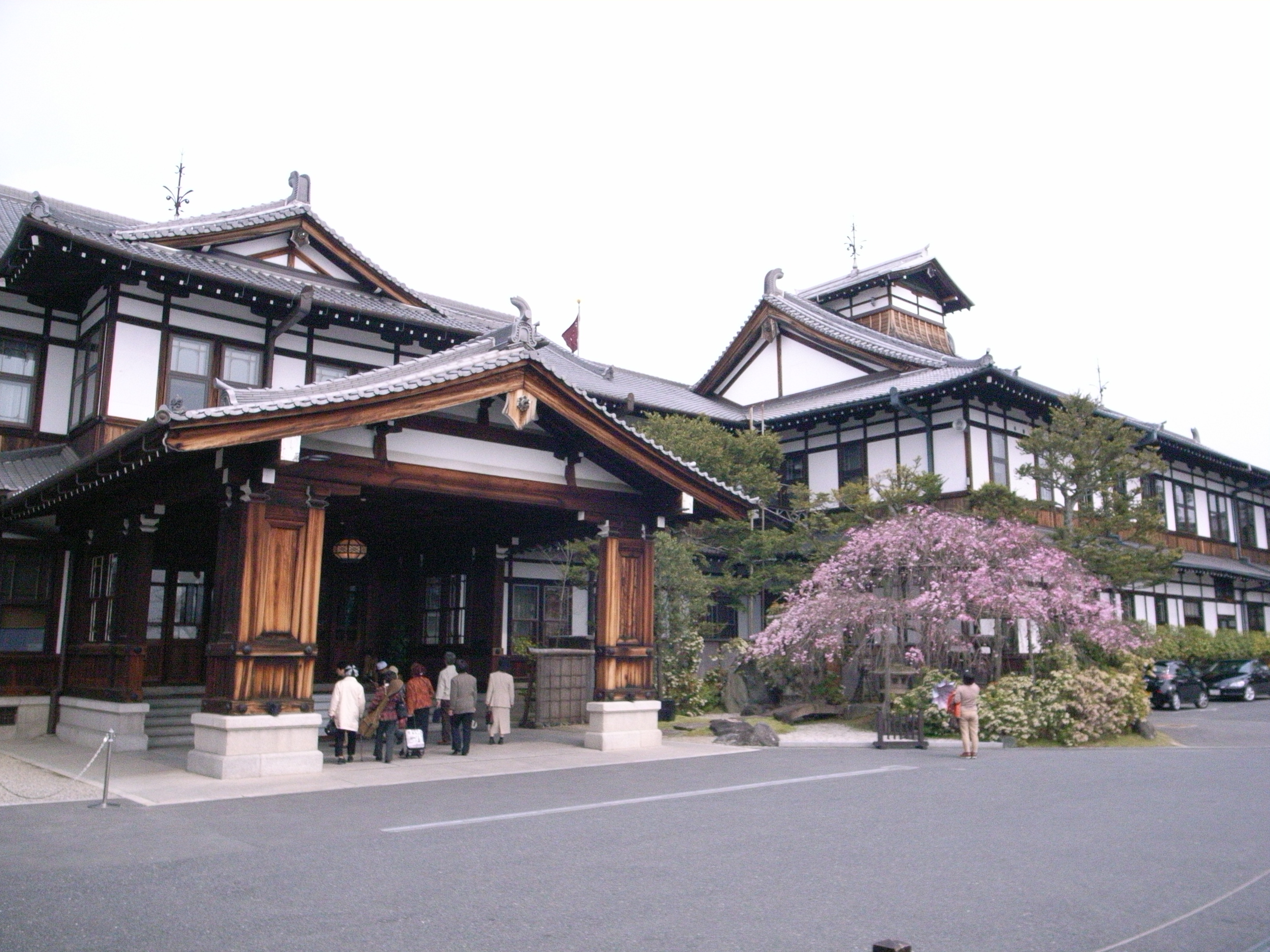
Nara Hotel, Nara, Japan

Having checked in at the Gokoku shrine the race started in earnest at 2 pm from Odori Park in the city of Sapporo on the northernmost Japanese island of Hokkaido, with the first leg finishing 1,600 kilometres (990 mi) south in the old imperial capital, Nara, on the main island of Honshu.

In an added twist to the usual rules, the teams were not permitted to use any Shinkansen (bullet trains) whilst in Japan.

Three teams took a train to the nearby port of Tomakomai. Eugenie & Isabel managed to catch an overnight ferry across the Tsugaru Strait to Sendai, whilst both Brydie & Sharon and Betty & James took the last ferry of the night to Hachinohe. The next day, Brydie & Sharon headed towards Tōnō en route to Tokyo, while Betty & James caught a train to Sendai, on the east coast of Honshu. Already in Sendai, Eugenie & Isabel decided to avoid Tokyo, the only team to do so, fearing the capital to be very expensive, and so took a bus to Niigata on the west coast. Betty & James took an excursion to Matsushima Bay before heading to Tokyo to work cleaning rickshaws.

Alfie & Owen were the first pair to reach the capital having arrived by bus where they witnessed a baby crying contest at the Naki Sumo festival before continuing to Mount Fuji by bus. There, on day 4, they undertook work cleaning at the campsite they had pitched their tents at. Having lost their map and stranded in the countryside, the pair backtracked to Tokyo before heading to Kyoto the next morning by bus.

Meanwhile Stephen & Viv visited an Onsen in Aomori before heading to Tokyo and onward to a job harvesting wasabi at a farm in Hotaka in exchange for bed and board. One of the farmers then dropped the pair at Matsumoto station where the pair caught a train to Kashihara, just south of Nara. In Tokyo, Brydie & Sharon took a train to Toba to wait on tables at a restaurant run by the local Ama women, whilst Betty & James proceeded directly to Osaka.

Eugenie & Isabel took a ferry to the small island of Sado in the Sea of Japan to visit the Myosenji Buddhist temple. Once back on Honshu they caught a bus to Kanazawa and then a train to Nara. Once the teams had arrived in Nara on day 5, they had to find their way to the Gango-ji temple before receiving instructions to the checkpoint which was at the Nara hotel. Finding themselves in a foot race with Alfie & Owen, Eugenie & Isabel beat them by a matter of minutes.

Order	Teams	Route	Hours behind leaders	Money left
1	Eugenie & Isabel	Sapporo → Tomakomai → Sendai → Niigata → Sado Island → Niigata → Kanazawa → Nara	—N/a	68%
2	Alfie & Owen	Sapporo → Aomori → Tokyo → Mount Fuji → Tokyo → Kyoto → Nara	2 minutes	79%
3	Betty & James	Sapporo → Tomakomai → Hachinohe → Sendai → Matsushima Bay → Tokyo → Osaka → Nara	1 hour 26 minutes	82%
4	Stephen & Viv	Sapporo → → Aomori → Tokyo → Hotaka → Matsumoto → Kashihara → Nara	2 hours 31 minutes	79%
5	Brydie & Sharon	Sapporo → Tomakomai → Hachinohe → Tōno → Tokyo → Toba → Osaka → Nara	4 hours 14 minutes	82%

=== Leg 2: Nara, Japan → Sokcho, South Korea ===
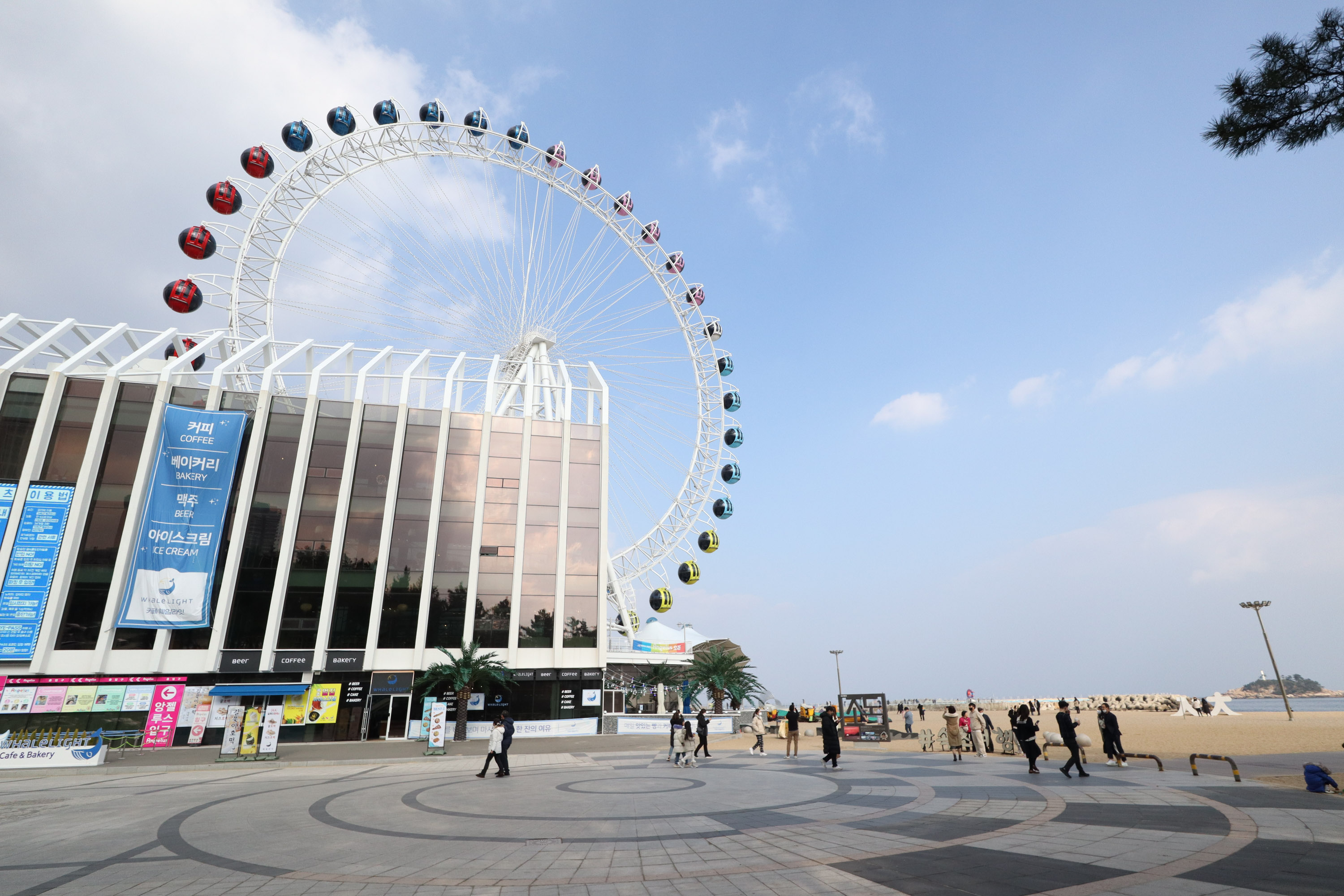
Sokcho, South Korea

The race restarted on day 7 to Sokcho in South Korea, a country which could only be reached by taking a ferry across the Korea Strait, from Hakata on the Japanese island of Kyushu to the port city of Busan.

Betty & James were the only team to cross onto the island of Shikoku (via the Great Naruto Bridge), where they helped trim some Japanese Acers to be used as garnish on Japanese food. They then caught a bus onward to Tokushima station where they just missed the only train of the day to Okayama delaying them for twenty-four hours. Brydie & Sharon had gone directly to Okayama to work aboard a fishing boat on the Seto Inland Sea but were also stranded for a day due to the lack of trains.

Alfie & Owen made their way to Kobe where the latter wanted to sample the famous Kobe beef despite Alfie’s concerns about the impact it would have on their budget. Much to Alfie’s relief and joy, the proprietor of the restaurant comped the meal. Afterwards the pair checked into a capsule hotel for the night. The next day they were repeatedly advised by the locals that reservations onward to Hakata should be made online. Stymied without internet access, a good samaritan eventually made the reservations on their behalf.

Stephen & Viv headed to northern Kansai in search of work repairing a thatched roof in exchange for bed and board. However, poor weather meant they were unable to repay their hosts hospitality due to safety concerns, so they insisted on cleaning the shrine instead. Afterwards the pair backtracked to Osaka and caught an overnight bus to Hiroshima. Already in Hiroshima, in search of a job opportunity as they had depleted almost a third of their entire race budget, were Eugenie & Isabel. There they paid their respects at the Hiroshima Peace Memorial Park after which they did a one hour shift in an Okonomiyaki restaurant, but instead of cooking, the duo found themselves washing dishes to due their late arrival.

On day 8, Alfie & Owen found themselves on the same ferry crossing as Eugenie & Isabel. On their arrival at the Hakata ferry port, Stephen & Viv were disappointed to learn that they had missed the only two daily crossings and would now have to wait until the next day, when they were caught up by both Brydie & Sharon and Betty & James.

On arrival in South Korea, Alfie & Owen immediately commenced traversing up the Korean peninsula by buses hugging the eastern seaboard, whereas Eugenie & Isabel replenished funds by working at the Jagalchi Fish Market alongside the Ajummas (old lady vendors). When the other three teams finally made it to Busan, Betty & James caught the last bus to Seoul but Brydie & Sharon opted to spend a night in the city before making their way to Daejeon the next day to work collecting chestnuts. Stephen & Viv meanwhile headed across the peninsula to Jeonju Hanok Village to work a shift dishwashing at a restaurant that specialised in Bibimbap.

On day 11 Eugenie & Isabel finally headed to Sokcho on a direct bus service, whilst Alfie & Owen were killing time by visiting Haesindang Park in Samcheok. In Sokcho the teams were advised to take a taxi to the Seokbong Ceramics Museum of Art. From there it was onto the Cheongchojeong and finally to the checkpoint. Alfie & Owen opted to walk in a bid to conserve funds and found themselves finishing four hours behind Eugenie & Isabel. When the other three teams finally arrived the overall positions had not changed, however the time differential between first and last place had grown to over thirty hours.

Order	Teams	Route	Hours behind leaders	Money left
1	Eugenie & Isabel	Nara → Kyoto → Hiroshima → Hakata → Busan → Sokcho	—N/a	54%
2	Alfie & Owen	Nara → Kobe → Hakata → Busan → Pohang → Samcheok → Sokcho	4 hours 28 minutes	60%
3	Betty & James	Nara → Shikoku → Tokushima → Okayama → Hakata → Busan → Seoul → Sokcho	18 hours 32 minutes	49%
4	Stephen & Viv	Nara → Kansai → Osaka → Hiroshima → Hakata → Busan → Jeonju → Sokcho	25 hours 51 minutes	62%
5	Brydie & Sharon	Nara → Okayama → Hakata → Busan → Daejeon → Sokcho	30 hours 23 minutes	58%

=== Leg 3: Hanoi, Vietnam → Phnom Penh, Cambodia ===
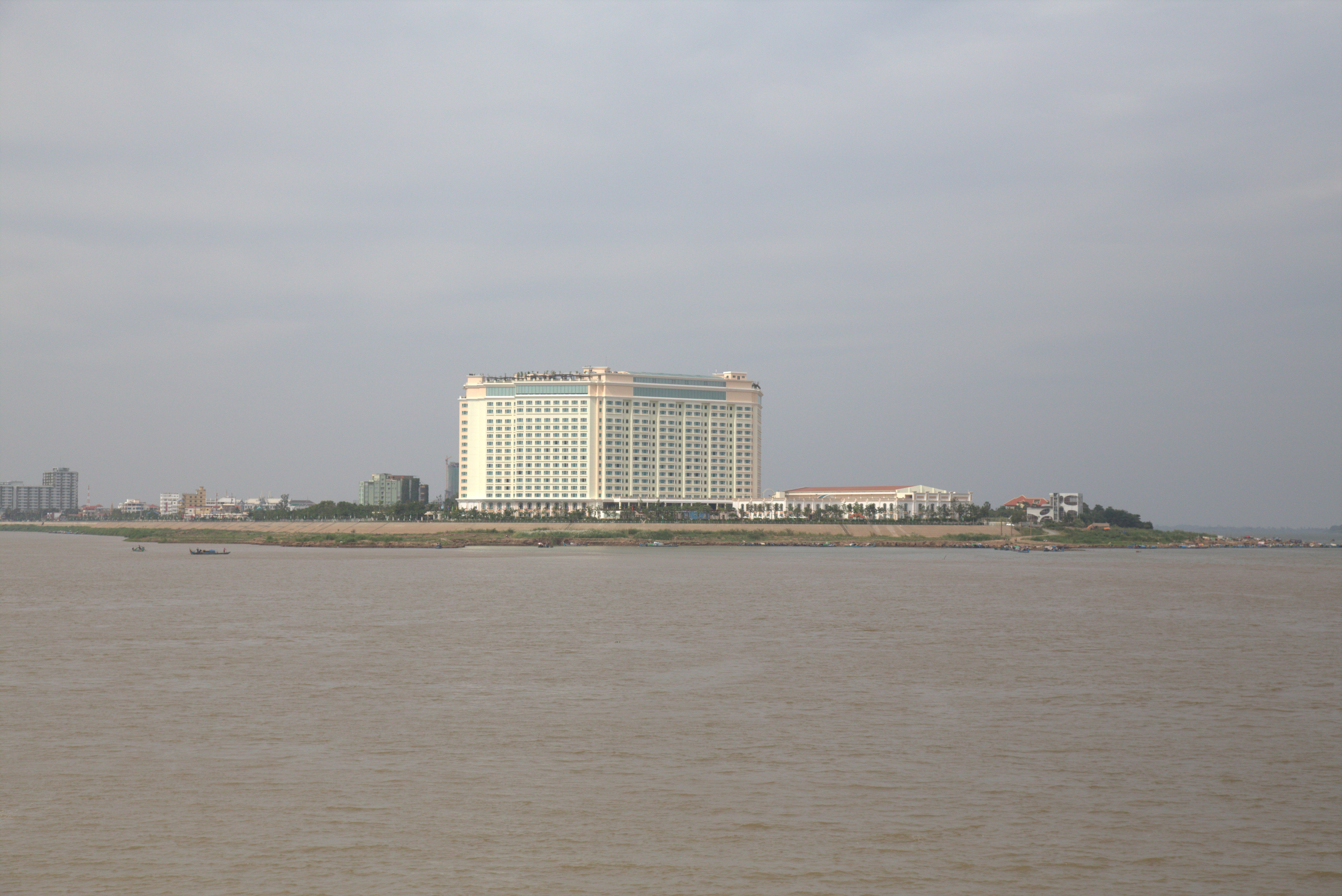
Sokha Phnom Penh Hotel, Phnom Penh, Cambodia

The race restarted on days 14 and 15 when the teams were transferred by air to Hanoi in Vietnam. It was revealed that the checkpoint was in Phnom Penh, capital city of Cambodia, 2,000 kilometres (1,200 mi) to the south, and that the team finishing last on this leg would be eliminated.

All of the teams decided to head south towards Da Nang. Three teams aimed for Ho Chi Minh City whilst the other two opted for the Lệ Thanh – Ou Ya Dav border crossing near Pleiku in the central highlands.

First to leave, having lost their map and still in need of replenishing their budget, Eugenie & Isabel decided to initially make for Ninh Binh by bus to work washing motorcycles. Not soon after Alfie & Owen started their journey to Ho Chi Minh City by catching an overnight train to Da Nang. The next day both Betty & James and Stephen & Viv also headed there by the cheaper but somewhat ironically, faster bus. In Da Nang, Betty & James caught up to Eugenie & Isabel when both teams found themselves at the same bus station headed to Pleiku. In Pleiku both pairs crossed the border to Banlung on the same bus service. Being the first day of Pchum Ben, onward transport options were limited and the two teams parted ways. Betty & James' attempt at earning money at a rubber plantation in a small village were scuppered by torrential rainfall and they were stranded there waiting for the weather to clear.

Meanwhile, Stephen & Viv continued onto Nha Trang from Da Nang by rail on their way to Ho Chi Minh City. Arriving after 30 hours, the pair took time to recuperate at the local mud baths before heading first to Da Lat and then onto Ho Chi Minh City by bus where they hoped to catch an onward connection to Chau Doc. In Chau Doc, they learnt of a ferry that traversed up the Mekong River to Phnom Penh but needed to take a taxi to catch it.

Having detoured through Hoi An, once in Ho Chi Minh City, Alfie & Owen worked in a nightclub, whereas Brydie & Sharon headed further south to Can Tho to work at a floating market before taking a taxi to the border. The former pair crossed into Cambodia at the border village of Kaam Samnor and hitched a lift to the capital. Also in Phnom Penh, but having arrived via a very expensive taxi journey were Betty & James. The teams were first given instructions to proceed to Wat Phnom and then by Tuk Tuk across the Japanese Bridge to a park containing the Neang Prachha Barami (clever woman) statue. Thereafter made their way to the checkpoint at the Sokha Hotel with Alfie & Owen arriving first on day 18 of the race. The last pair to arrive were Brydie & Sharon and therefore eliminated.

Order	Teams	Route	Hours behind leaders	Money left
1	Alfie & Owen	Hanoi → Da Nang → Hoi An → Ho Chi Minh City → Chau Doc → Khanh An Sam Nom → Phnom Penh	—N/a	47%
2	Eugenie & Isabel	Hanoi → Ninh Binh → Da Nang → Pleiku → Banlung → Phnom Penh	1 hour 32 minutes	48%
3	Betty & James	Hanoi → Da Nang → Pleiku → Banlung → Phnom Penh	8 hours 43 minutes	39%
4	Stephen & Viv	Hanoi → Da Nang → Nha Trang → Da Lat → Ho Chi Minh City → Chau Doc → Phnom Penh	17 hours 34 minutes	52%
5	Brydie & Sharon	Hanoi → Ho Chi Minh City → Can Tho → Phnom Penh		

=== Leg 4: Phnom Penh, Cambodia → Mae Sariang, Thailand ===
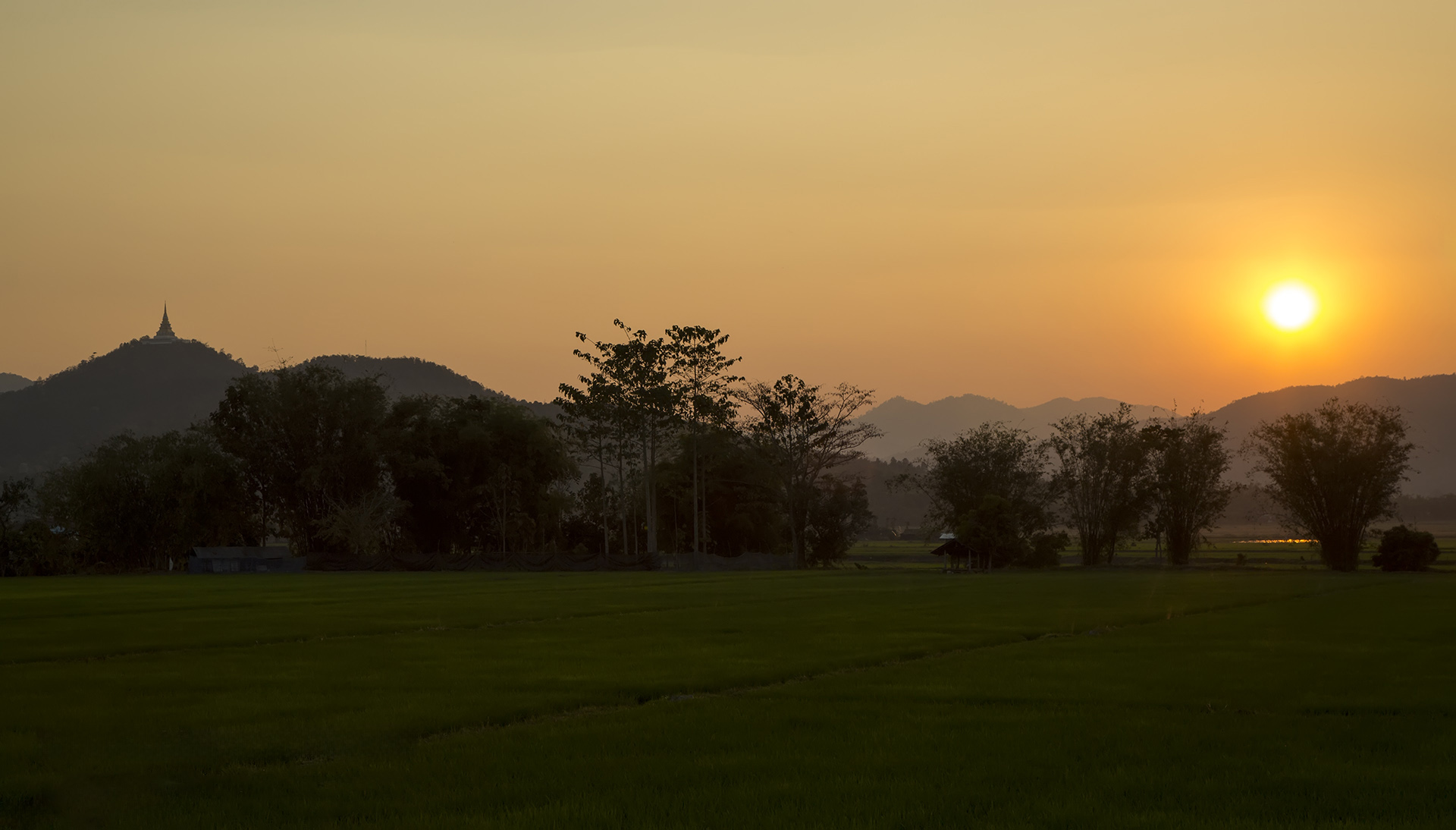
Mae Sariang, Thailand

Three teams took the opportunity to receive blessings and pay their respects at a buddhist temple before recommencing the race on day 20. The next checkpoint was revealed to be in Mae Sariang, some 1,400 kilometres (870 mi) to the north in the Shan Highlands of Thailand.

Excited at the prospect of the 'land of smiles', Alfie & Owen headed straight for the border at Poipet whilst Eugenie & Isabel travelled to Krakor on the shores of Tonle Sap Lake where they visited Kampong Luong, a floating village and caught Siamese Mud Carp to make Prahok in exchange for bed and board.

Siblings Betty & James planned to head to Battambang, but having mislaid his money belt, James was fortunate to recover it, only to find that the cash contained within had been stolen. Luckily his passport was still in it and the pair, although able to continue with the race, were forced to take a bus to Siem Reap instead of their intended destination. Whilst there they decided to forgo the attractions of Angkor Wat and made for the border crossing at O Smach and into the rural Isan region of Thailand.

On day 21 and the last to leave, Stephen & Viv took the first option available, which was coincidentally also to Battambang. There they took a side trip to the Phnom Sampeau Caves to see the carvings of the Buddha and the immense bat colony that calls them home. They also learnt of the area's gruesome past during the regime of the Khmer Rouge and Pol Pot. First to cross into Thailand, Owen & Alfie also decided on an excursion. For them it was to the Khao Yai National Park, but having caught the wrong bus they ended up in Nakhon Ratchasima before heading Pak Chong and their intended goal where they camped overnight, observed the local fauna, including Sambar deer and wild elephants in their natural habitat during a night safari, and trekked to the Haew Suwat falls.

Also passing through Nakhon Ratchasima were Stephen & Viv making their way to Lampang to work at a horse stables, before arriving in Chiang Mai on Day 25. Working with animals as well were Betty and James, who had traversed through the province of Roi Et to toil at a farm tending the Water buffalo, before travelling onward to Mae Sot.

Having crossed the border at Poipet into the adjacent town of Aranyaprathet, Eugenie & Isabel bus-hopped to Saraburi, then Lopburi before ending up in Phitsanulok. There they visited the nearby Ban Khlong Water lily park, but family tensions stopped them fully enjoying the attraction, before they travelled onward to Chiang Mai where they crossed paths with Stephen & Viv at the main bus terminal, where both teams secured different songthaews to take them to Mae Sariang.

Owen & Alfie found themselves stranded for some time at Kaeng Khoi Junction having opted for another side trip, this time to white water raft on the Khek River travelling there via Khon Kaen, they then took a very expensive taxi to Mae Sariang in an attempt to make up time.

Arriving into Mae Sariang during Vassa, at a bridge over the Yuam River, the teams received directions to the checkpoint at the Hotel Riverhouse. Stephen & Viv arrived first, followed by Eugenie & Isabel a few minutes later. Owen & Alfie arrived last upending the leaderboard whilst the middle order remained unchanged.

Order	Teams	Route	Hours behind leaders	Money left
1	Stephen & Viv	Phnom Penh → Battambang → Nakhon Ratchasima → Lampang → Chiang Mai → Mae Sariang	—N/a	45%
2	Eugenie & Isabel	Phnom Penh → Krakor → Kampong Luong → Poipet → Saraburi → Lopburi → Phitsanulok → Chiang Mai → Mae Sariang	2 minutes	40%
3	Betty & James	Phnom Penh → Siem Reap → O Smach → Roi Et → Mae Sot → Mae Sariang	3 hours 47 minutes	31%
4	Alfie & Owen	Phnom Penh → Poipet → Nakhon Ratchasima → Pak Chong → Khao Yai National Park → Kaeng Khoi junction → Khon Kaen → Khek River → Mae Sariang	11 hours 27 minutes	35%

=== Leg 5: Mae Sariang, Thailand → Koh Phi Phi, Thailand ===
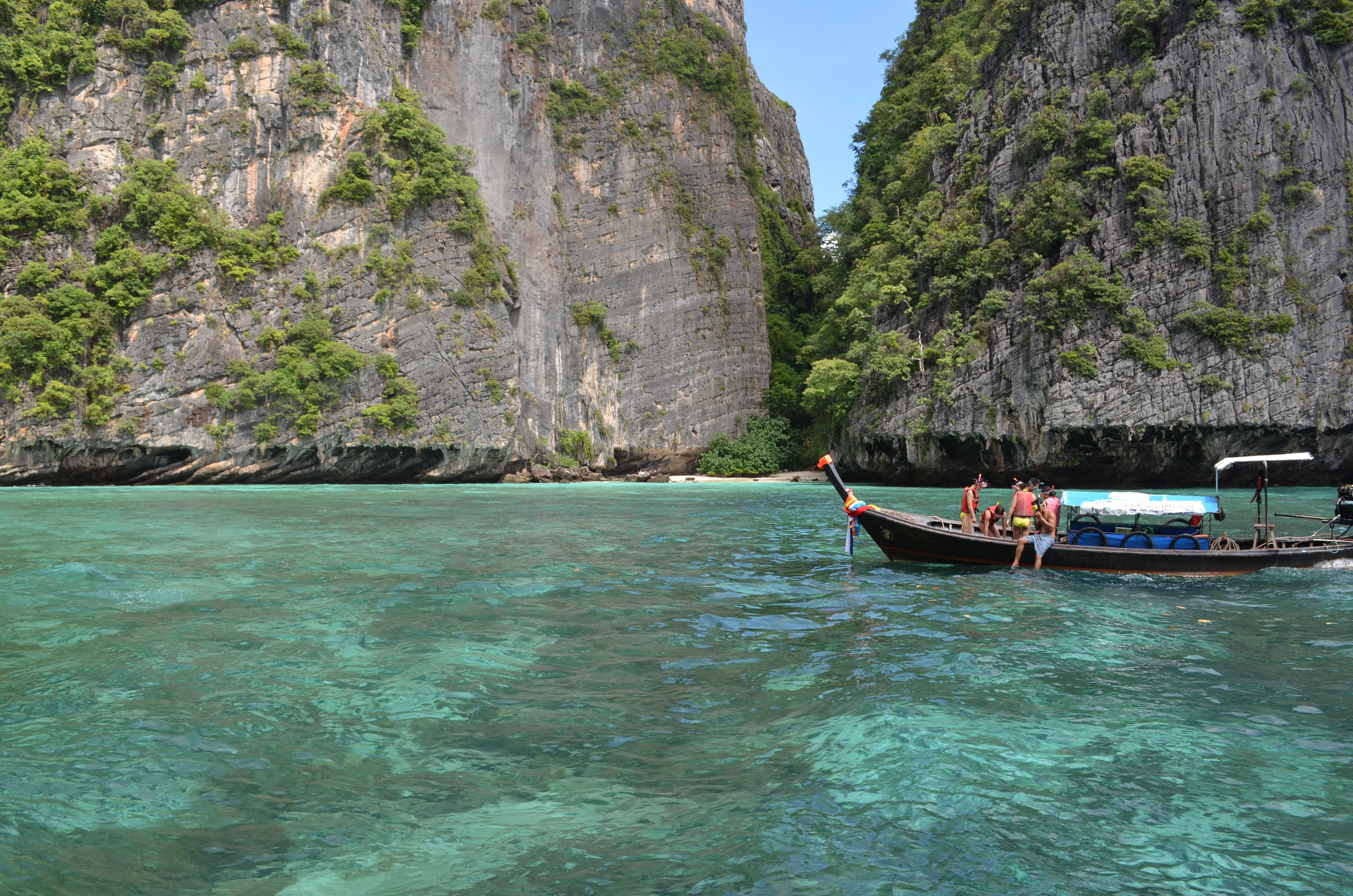
Koh Phi Phi, Thailand

On day 27, the race restarted from Mae Sariang, with all four teams transiting through the capital, Bangkok, en route to the checkpoint in the Phi Phi Islands some 1,500 kilometres (930 mi) to the south.

First to leave, Stephen & Viv, managed to hitch a lift as far as Chiang Mai en route to their first stop, Rangsit, on the outskirts of Bangkok to work at a duck farm. Betty & James also headed to Chiang Mai and watched some Muay Thai and visited Wat Phra That Doi Suthep whilst in the city.

Eugenie & Isabel chose Mae Sot as their stepping stone to the capital, but decided to take a side trip to the Erawan Falls in the Kanchanburi province once they reached Nakhon Sawan. At the falls the Doctor fish provided a new experience for the pair.

Alfie & Owen, disappointed with finishing last on the previous leg, wanted to hurry directly to Bangkok, but found themselves stranded for another day waiting for seat space on the bus service. They made use of the down time by working alongside the housekeeping department at a hotel.

In Bangkok Stephen & Viv decided to head for Khanom on the east coast by train to see some rare Pink dolphins in the Gulf of Thailand. When Alfie & Owen eventually arrived into the capital, they opted to make Surat Thani their next port of call but had over nine hours to kill, so took the opportunity to visit Wat Pho and see the giant reclining buddha before heading south to work making a type of Nam phrik in Tha Khoei. Betty & James also opted to replenish funds, selecting a job opportunity in Kaset Phatthana at a Guava farm. Eugenie & Isabel chose a night bus from the capital directly to Krabi.

With the Phi Phi archipelago only accessible by marine transport from either Phuket or Krabi, Betty & James opted for Phuket whilst the other three teams chose Krabi and a service across the Andaman Sea. Stephen & Viv chose the slower two-hour ferry crossing in order to preserve funds as opposed to the 45-minute hop in a speedboat which was twice the price. Having caught them up, Alfie & Owen also chose the same service, mistakenly confident that if it came to a foot race against Stephen & Viv, the odds would be in their favour. Meanwhile in Phuket, Betty & James splashed out for a speedboat crossing, a decision that would prove decisive.

On arrival in Ko Phi Phi Don, the teams were instructed to take a long-tail boat from Bay View Beach to Shark Point and the checkpoint. Betty & James arrived first with a margin of 14 minutes. Eugenie & Isabel were the last team to arrive a little over two hours later.

Order	Teams	Route	Hours behind leaders	Money left
1	Betty & James	Mae Sariang → Chiang Mai → Bangkok → Kaset Phatthana → Bangkok → Phuket → Ko Phi Phi Don	—N/a	23%
2	Stephen & Viv	Mae Sariang → Chiang Mai → Rangsit → Bangkok → Khanom → Krabi → Ko Phi Phi Don	14 minutes	37%
3	Alfie & Owen	Mae Sariang → Bangkok → Surat Thani → Tha Khoei → Krabi → Ko Phi Phi Don	14 minutes	30%
4	Eugenie & Isabel	Mae Sariang → Mae Sot → Nakhon Sawan → Kanchanaburi → Erawan National Park → Bangkok → Krabi → Ko Phi Phi Don	2 hours 10 minutes	30%

=== Leg 6: Koh Phi Phi, Thailand → Bukittinggi, Indonesia ===
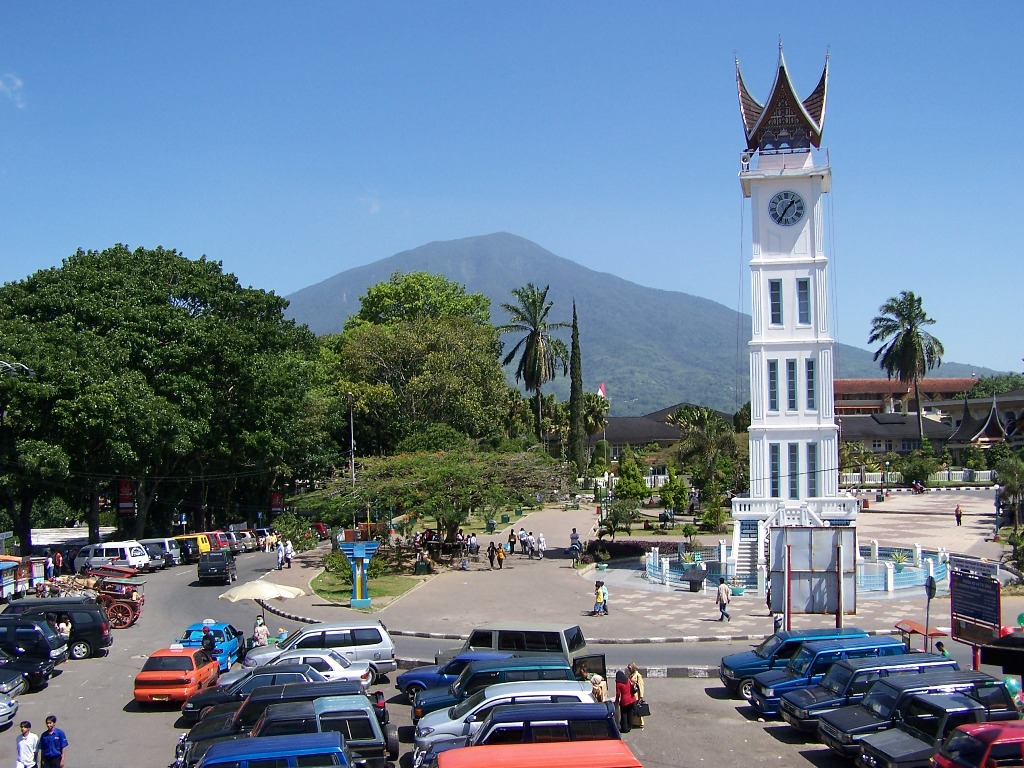
Bukittinggi, Indonesia

On day 34, the race recommenced from Ko Phi Phi Don, Thailand with the sixth leg finishing 2,000 kilometres (1,200 mi) to the south in Bukittinggi, Indonesia.

The three leading teams chose to hop across the Andaman Sea via the islands of Ko Lipe and Langkawi, with only Eugenie & Isabel backtracking to the Thai mainland and choosing an overland route. On Ko Lipe, Betty & James replenished funds at a diving school and Stephen & Viv worked a shift at a bar. Alfie & Owen leapfrogged ahead to Langkawi for their money earning opportunity at Hutan Bakau Kubang Badak (Kubang Badak Mangrove Reserve), replanting mangrove trees and clearing the beach of litter.

On arrival in Langkawi, Stephen & Viv made a plan to head for George Town on the island of Penang to see the colonial architecture and to work a shift at a family rice delicacy (kuih) factory, whilst Alfie & Owen pressed onward to Kuala Kedah on the mainland and then headed directly to catch an overnight bus to the capital, Kuala Lumpur, where they took an excursion to see the Petronas Towers.

Already on the mainland, Eugenie & Isabel opted for a homestay in Kampong Pulau Belantik, where they received bed and board in exchange for working at a rice plantation. They then decided to travel to Ipoh for another work opportunity, this time labouring on a pomelo farm. Betty & James also passed through Ipoh on their way to the village of Bagan Sungai Burong where they helped out on a fishing boat. On arrival, they realised once again that they had been careless with their passports. After backtracking to the bus station, once again lady luck smiled on them and they were reunited with their belongings.

All four teams ultimately took the ferry across the Strait of Malacca from the port in Malacca City to Dumai on the east coast of Sumatra. Two teams found themselves neck and neck from Malacca City all the way to the Pekanbaru.

After travelling across the island of Sumatra, the teams reached Bukittinggi on the west coast of the island, where they were instructed to take an angkot to the Jam Gadang (big clock) tower. Alfie & Owen were the first to reach the checkpoint at Padi Ecolodge, with the other teams arriving a day later due to the lack of an evening ferry.

Order	Teams	Route	Hours behind leaders	Money left
1	Alfie & Owen	Koh Phi Phi → Ko Lipe → Kuah, Langkawi → Kubang Badak Mangrove Reserve → Kuala Kedah → Kuala Lumpur → Malacca City → Dumai → Bukittinggi	—N/a	17%
2	Stephen & Viv	Koh Phi Phi → Ko Lipe → Kuah, Langkawi → Kuala Kedah → George Town → Malacca City → Dumai → Pekanbaru → Bukittinggi	23 hours 27 minutes	27%
3	Eugenie & Isabel	Koh Phi Phi → Krabi → Kampong Pulau Belantik → Ipoh → Malacca City → Dumai → Pekanbaru → Bukittinggi	23 hours 28 minutes	21%
4	Betty & James	Koh Phi Phi → Ko Lipe → Kuah, Langkawi → Kuala Kedah → Ipoh → Bagan Sungai Burong → Ipoh → Malacca City → Dumai → Bukittinggi	24 hours 29 minutes	9%

=== Leg 7: Bukittinggi, Indonesia → Jakarta, Indonesia ===
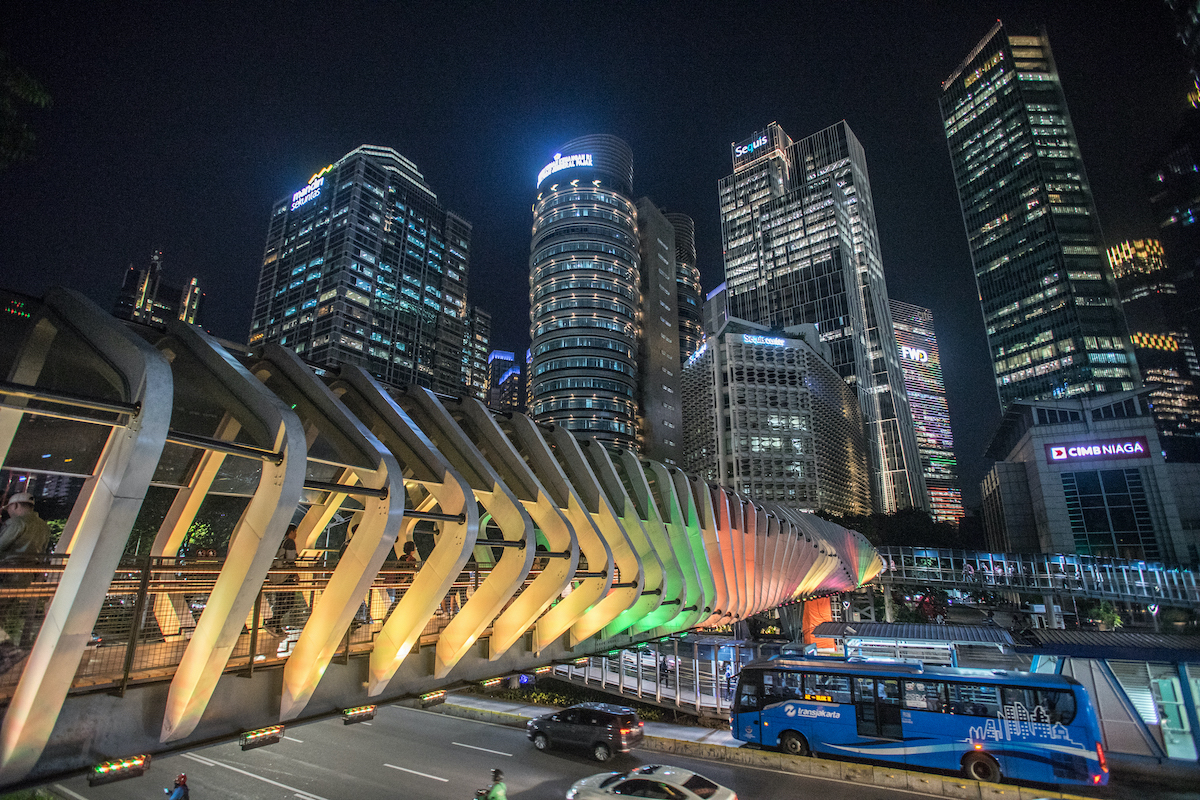
Jakarta, Indonesia

Before the race recommenced, Owen celebrated his 21st birthday a day early in Bukittinggi by being egged and floured in the traditional Indonesian way before he and Alfie recommenced their race on day 40.

The next checkpoint was revealed to be the nation's capital, Jakarta, on the island of Java, approximately 1,300 kilometres (810 mi) to the south.

The duo opted to stick to the western coast and initially headed to Padang to assist some local fishermen in exchange for bed and board before catching a nineteen-hour bus to Bengkulu to earn some more money, this time cleaning surfboards. They were rewarded with a free surfing lesson, before they had to depart on another long-distance bus, this time to Bandar Lampung.

On day 41, the three remaining teams departed the checkpoint. Eugenie & Isabel commandeered a pre-booked taxi belonging to Stephen & Viv to the local bus station where they made the decision to pay for a car to take them to the regency of Dharmasraya instead of hanging around for the scheduled bus. Both Betty & James and Stephen & Viv headed for Sungai Pagu on the same seven-hour angkot service where they parted company. The siblings went onto a money earning opportunity making bricks whilst Stephen & Viv took advantage of a homestay in a traditional Rumah Gadang property with its distinctive gonjong roof, before moving onto Sungai Penuh for another homestay and work on the host families' cinnamon farm. Eugenie & Isabel also took advantage of a Sumatran homestay and helped their host family who were in the business of Batik production. They then ventured south on a 20-hour bus ride to Palembang, where they worked a shift serving Pempek, a popular deep-fried fishcake.

Due to the lack of spoken English, Betty & James accidentally found themselves travelling backwards for three hours to Solok near Bukittinggi, but were fortunate to find an overnight bus to the coal-mining town of Muara Enim, where they took another opportunity to replenish funds, this time working in a restaurant that specialised in Tahu sumedang. Betty opened up about her MRKH diagnosis at the age of 16, and how it had shaped her life. The siblings headed next to Bandar Lampung by bus, a waypoint Eugenie & Isabel had splashed out on a taxi to reach. Having already reached Bandar Lampung, Alfie & Owen also splashed out on their first taxi of the leg, to the ferry terminal at Bakauheni. They crossed the Sunda Strait to the Port of Merak and wasted no time in pressing onward to Jakarta, unaware Eugenie & Isabel were now less than half an hour behind them.

In Jakarta the teams were instructed to take a bus from Gelora Bung Karno station to Karet Sudirman and then onto the checkpoint by foot at the Orient Hotel. Alfie & Owen maintained their lead arriving first once again, but Eugenie & Isabel had narrowed the time differential between first and second place down to just 12 minutes.

Order	Teams	Route	Hours behind leaders	Money left
1	Alfie & Owen	Bukittinggi → Padang → Bengkulu → Bandar Lampung → Port of Bakauheni → Port of Merak → Jakarta	—N/a	11%
2	Eugenie & Isabel	Bukittinggi → Dharmasraya → Palembang → Bandar Lampung → Port of Bakauheni → Port of Merak → Jakarta	12 minutes	15%
3	Betty & James	Bukittinggi → Sungai Pagu → Solok → Muara Enim → Bandar Lampung → Port of Bakauheni → Port of Merak → Jakarta	25 hours 36 minutes	6%
4	Stephen & Viv	Bukittinggi → Sungai Pagu → Sungai Penuh → Port of Bakauheni → Port of Merak → Jakarta	31 hours 46 minutes	20%

=== Leg 8: Jakarta, Indonesia → Gili Meno, Indonesia ===
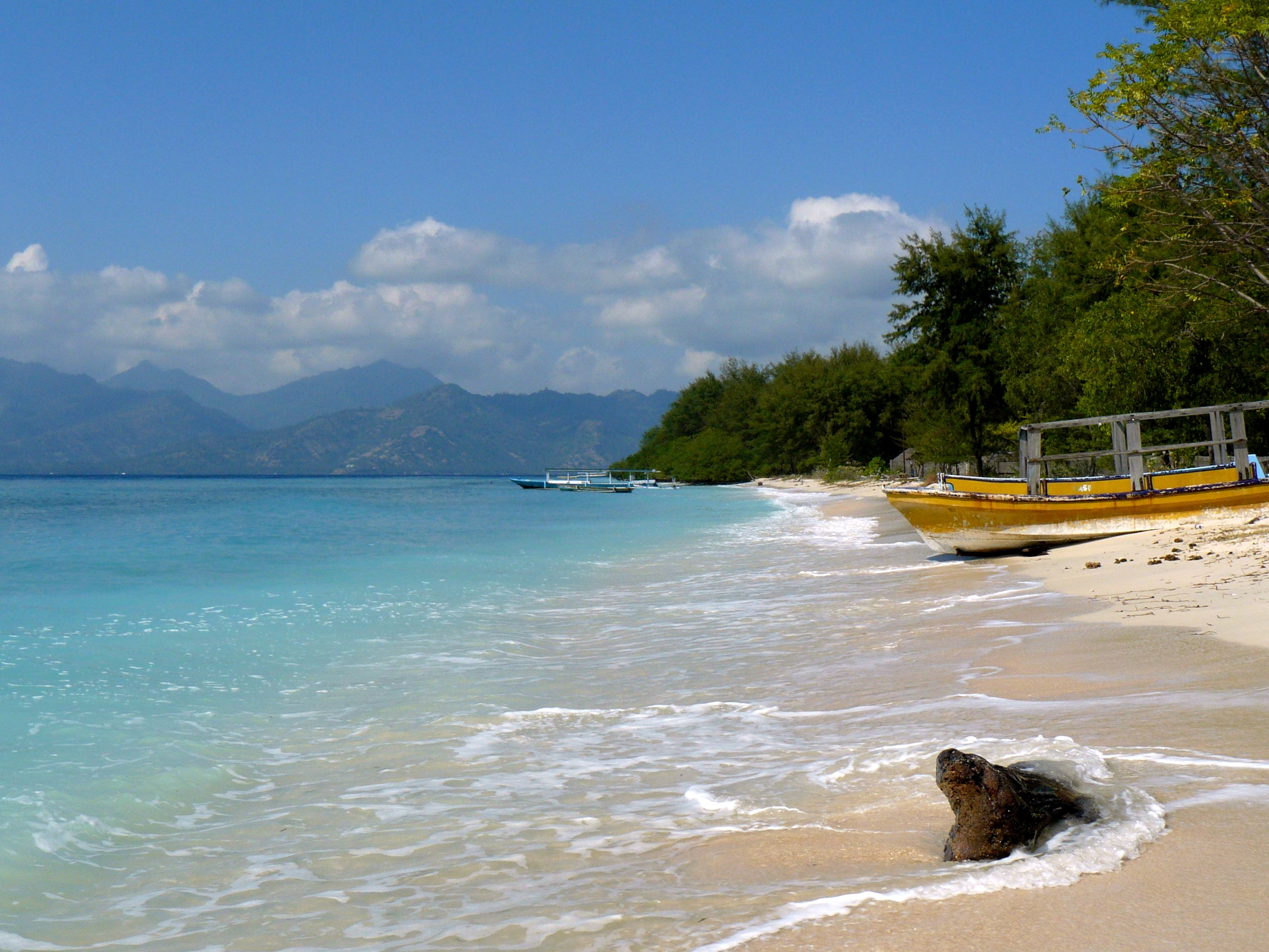
Gili Meno, Lombok, Indonesia

The final leg of the race began on day 46, only a few hours after the arrival of Stephen & Viv at the Orient hotel in Jakarta, with Alfie & Owen finding out that the initial destination would be Bangsal on the island of Lombok, 1,400 kilometres (870 mi) to the east.

They decided to stick to the northern coast of Java and head first to Semarang. A strategy also employed by Eugenie & Isabel. After bumping into each other at Pasar Senen railway station, Alfie & Owen decided to put some distance between themselves and the ladies by catching an overnight train to Surabaya instead.

When Eugenie & Isabel reached Semarang, they were prevented from travelling to Malang until the next morning so they took the opportunity to take in the sights including Blenduk church and the Sam Poo Kong shrine.

Betty & James only had 6% of their budget left and decided on the northern coast of Java too, but made Cirebon their first stop to top up funds at a salt farm on the coast at Pangenan. However, what little earnings they made had to be offset with their overnight accommodation costs.

The only team to take the more touristy southern route were Stephen & Viv, who with the healthiest budget decided to forgo any work opportunities and headed to Yogyakarta via Bandung where they went to see the nearby stratovolcano of Tangkuban Perahu.

In Surabaya, Alfie & Owen headed onto Malang, but not before detouring to the local airport by bus and taxi to exchange all their remaining funds into Indonesian rupiahs. When the two leading teams arrived in Malang, they both decided to head to the port of Ketapang to cross the Bali Strait to Gilimanuk. In the downtime between transport connections, Eugenie & Isabel visited the Jodipan neighbourhood with its colourful houses where they discovered Alfie & Owen painting the properties to earn extra cash.

On reaching the island of Bali, both the leading teams raced straight across the island by splurging on taxis to Padangbai to catch a ferry across the Lombok Strait. Eugenie & Isabel were tipped off by a local of another team having passed through the port earlier. Deflated, the mother and daughter duo took a service to Lembar and then proceeded by taxi to Bangsal, which is exactly what Alfie & Owen had done four hours earlier. Having arrived in the dead of night, the best friends were unable to take a boat to Gili Meno, a small island offshore, as instructed until services resumed the next morning, by which time Eugenie & Isabel had caught up.

At the masjid on the island, the teams were directed to Seri Resort and the finish line on the beach. Alfie & Owen arrived first, after fifty days on the road and with just 1% of their budget remaining, beating Eugenie & Isabel by just eight minutes. Betty & James arrived a day later almost completely out of funds. Stephen & Viv also arrived on day 51, just over thirty hours after the winning pair.

Order	Teams	Route	Hours behind leaders	Money left
1	Alfie & Owen	Jakarta → Surabaya → Malang → Port of Ketapang → Gilimanuk → Padangbai → Lembar → Bangsal → Gili Meno	—N/a	1% £33.14
2	Eugenie & Isabel	Jakarta → Semarang → Malang → Port of Ketapang → Gilimanuk → Padangbai → Lembar → Bangsal → Gili Meno	8 minutes	4% £102.02
3	Betty & James	Jakarta → Cirebon → Pangenan → Surabaya → Port of Ketapang → Lombok → Bangsal → Gili Meno	24 hours 34 minutes	0.05% £1.48
4	Stephen & Viv	Jakarta → Bandung → Yogyakarta → Port of Ketapang → Gilimanuk → Lombok → Bangsal → Gili Meno	30 hours 20 minutes	7% £182.13

== Ratings ==
Episode no.	Airdate	7 days		28 days	
Episode no.	Airdate	Total viewers (millions)	Ranking (all channels)	Total viewers (millions)	Ranking (all channels)
1	10 April 2024	5.48	3	7.09	3
2	17 April 2024	5.02	6	7.13	4
3	24 April 2024	5.49	4	7.21	3
4	1 May 2024	5.64	3	7.01	6
5	8 May 2024	5.09	4	6.82	3
6	15 May 2024	5.57	2	7.15	2
7	22 May 2024	5.55	2	6.84	2
8	29 May 2024	5.99	2	6.77	1
9	29 May 2024	3.31	25	3.85	24
