= Ban Kat =

Ban Kat may refer to:

- Ban Kat, Mae Sariang, tambon (subdistrict) of Mae Sariang District, Mae Hong Son Province, Thailand
- Ban Kat, Mae Wang, tambon of Mae Wang District, Chiang Mai Province, Thailand
- Ban Kat, tambon of Sung Men District, Phrae Province, Thailand
