= Pa Pae, Mae Hong Son =

Coordinates: 18°15′24″N 98°2′56″E

Pa Pae ป่าแป๋
- Subdistrict
- Interactive map of Pa Pae
- Country: Thailand
- Province: Mae Hong Son
- District: Mae Sariang

Population (2005)
  - Total: 5,755
- Time zone: UTC+7 (ICT)

Pa Pae (Thai: ป่าแป๋) is a village and tambon (sub-district) of Mae Sariang District, in Mae Hong Son Province, Thailand. In 2005 it had a population of 5,755 people. The tambon contains 12 villages.

Ban Pa Pae is home to the Lua hill tribe, also known as Le Wuea and Lawa. It has 94 families. Traditionally, the people are rice farmers, cultivating one crop per year on terraces in the mountainous terrain. In 1970, King Bhumibol and the queen visited Ban Pa Pae. The king encouraged the villagers to establish a rice bank to dampen the feast or famine cycle of rice availability. He gave 20,000 baht to cover start-up costs. To get started, the villagers bought 200,000 kg of rice with the funds. The rice bank now lends rice to villagers at 20% interest, payable in kind. The rice bank has now (2016) been operating for 46 years. Produce grown in the village is sold to the Mae Sariang Royal Project Development Centre. The king and queen visited the village five times between 1970 and 1981 to follow-up on progress. In 1979, a dirt road was cut to the village. It got electricity in 1996.
