= Mae Ho =

Mae Ho แม่เหาะ
- Subdistrict
- Interactive map of Mae Ho
- Country: Thailand
- Province: Mae Hong Son
- District: Mae Sariang

Population (2005)
  - Total: 7,813
- Time zone: UTC+7 (ICT)

Mae Ho (Thai: แม่เหาะ) is a village and tambon (sub-district) of Mae Sariang District, in Mae Hong Son Province, Thailand. In 2005 it had a population of 7,813. The tambon contains 13 villages.
