= Mae Win =

District in Chiang Mai Province, Thailand

Coordinates: 18.6567°N 98.6816°E

Mae Win แม่วิน
- Tambon
- Interactive map of Mae Win
- Country: Thailand
- Province: Chiang Mai
- District: Mae Wang

Population (2005)
  - Total: 10,879
- Time zone: UTC+7 (ICT)

Mae Win (Thai: แม่วิน) is a tambon (subdistrict) of Mae Wang District, in Chiang Mai Province, Thailand. In 2005 it had a population of 10,879 people. The tambon contains 19 villages.
