= Yuam River =

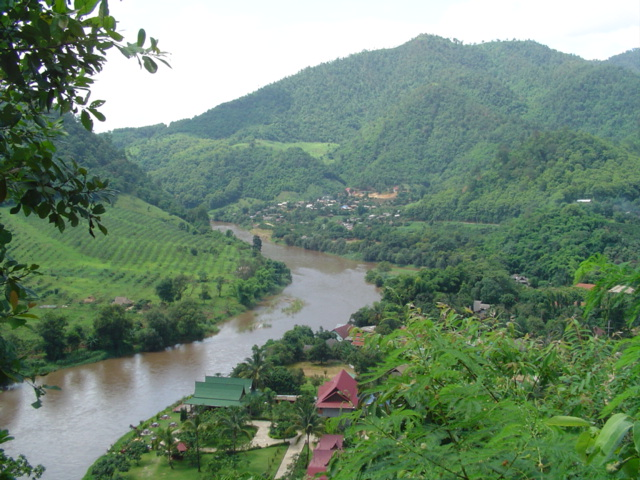
- The Yuam River near Mae Sariang

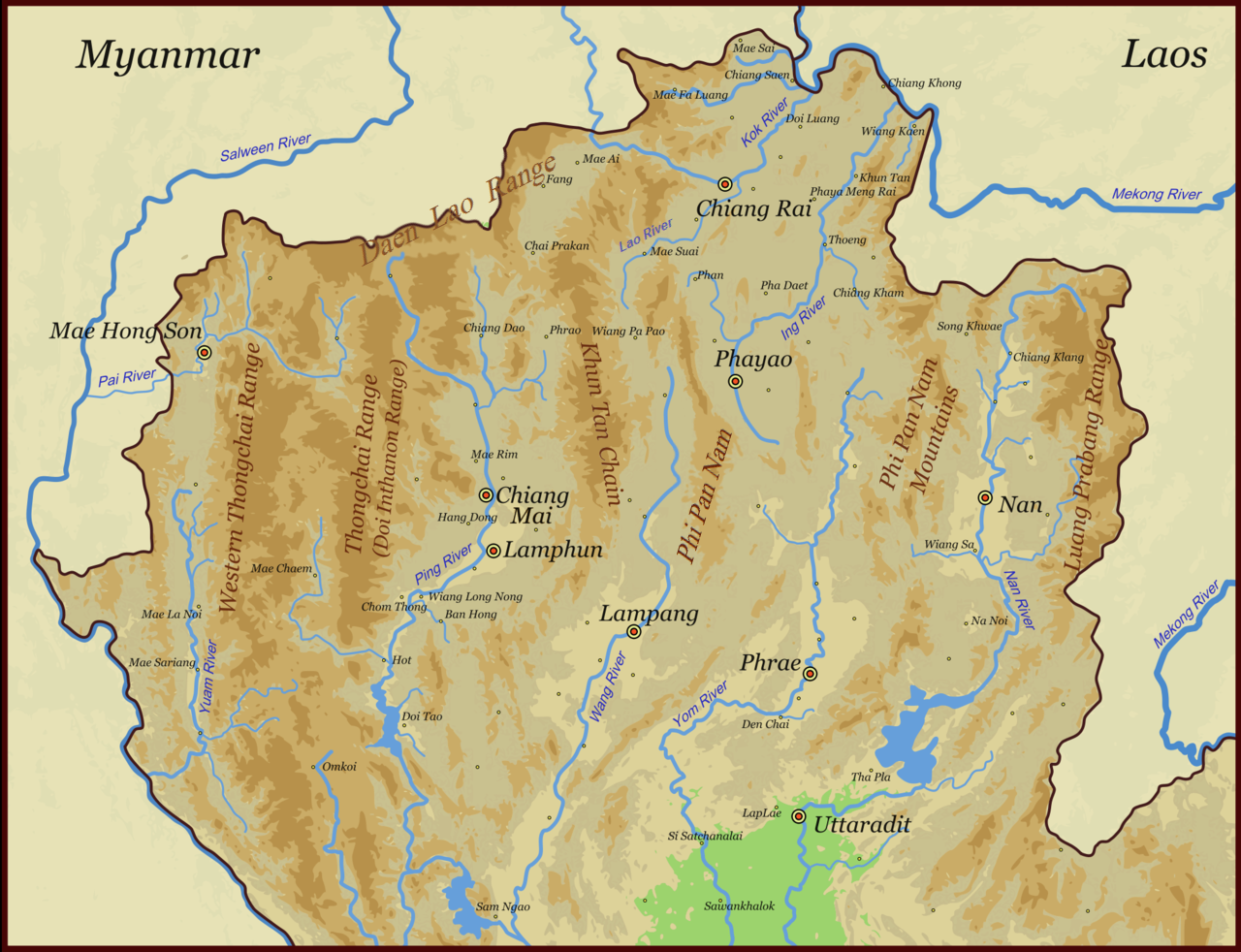
- Map of the Thai highlands
- Native name: แม่น้ำยวม (Thai)

Location
- Country: Thailand, Burma
- State: Mae Hong Son Province (Thailand)
- District: Khun Yuam District, Mae La Noi District, Mae Sariang District, Sop Moei District

Physical characteristics
- Source
  - location: Thanon Thong Chai Range, Khun Yuam District, Mae Hong Son Province, Thailand
- Mouth: Moei River
  - location: At the border with Burma
  - coordinates: 17°49′55″N 97°41′31″E
  - elevation: 52 m (171 ft)

The Yuam River (Thai: แม่น้ำยวม; Northern Thai: น้ำแม่ยวม) is a river in northwestern Thailand, part of the Salween watershed. It originates in the mountains of the Thanon Thong Chai Range, Khun Yuam District, Mae Hong Son Province, Thailand. The river flows in a north–south direction and then in Sop Moei District it bends westwards and then northwestwards, forming a stretch of the Thai/Burmese border shortly before it joins the left bank of the Moei River, shortly before its confluence with the Salween.

The Ngao River, which unlike most rivers in Thailand flows northwards, is one of the Yuam's main tributaries.

== Environment ==
The Thai government, to solve persistent water shortages in the central region, have proposed a 70.7 billion baht plan to divert some 1.8 billion m^{3} of water annually from the Yuam River to the perennially underfilled Bhumibol Dam. As part of the plan, the Royal Irrigation Department (RID), would build 69 metre high dam with a storage capacity of 68.7 million m^{3} constructed on 2,075 rai of forest land, together with a pumping station on a separate 55 rai plot and a 61.5 kilometre-long tunnel passing through 14 villages. The inhabitants of the area—primarily Karen tribes people—largely oppose the project. In December 2019, the RID submitted a second environmental impact assessment (EIA) to the Office of the Natural Resources and Environmental Policy and Planning (ONEP). ONEP rejected the EIA for the second time due to concerns about forest destruction, tunnel rock waste, and compensation issues.

== See also ==
- River systems of Thailand
- Mae Ngao National Park
