= Sao Hin =

Sao Hin เสาหิน
- Subdistrict
- Interactive map of Sao Hin
- Country: Thailand
- Province: Mae Hong Son
- District: Mae Sariang

Population (2005)
  - Total: 2,691
- Time zone: UTC+7 (ICT)

Sao Hin (Thai: เสาหิน) is a river village and tambon (sub-district) of Mae Sariang District, in Mae Hong Son Province, Thailand. In 2005, it had a population of 2,691. The tambon contains six villages.
