= Thung Ruang Thong, Chiang Mai =

Thung Ruang Thong ทุ่งรวงทอง
- Tambon
- Country: Thailand
- Province: Chiang Mai
- District: Mae Wang

Population (2005)
  - Total: 2,650
- Time zone: UTC+7 (ICT)

Thung Ruang Thong (Thai: ทุ่งรวงทอง) is a tambon (subdistrict) of Mae Wang District, in Chiang Mai Province, Thailand. In 2005 it had a population of 2,650 people. The tambon contains eight villages.
