= Tunnel rock recycling =

Method to utilize rock debris from tunneling

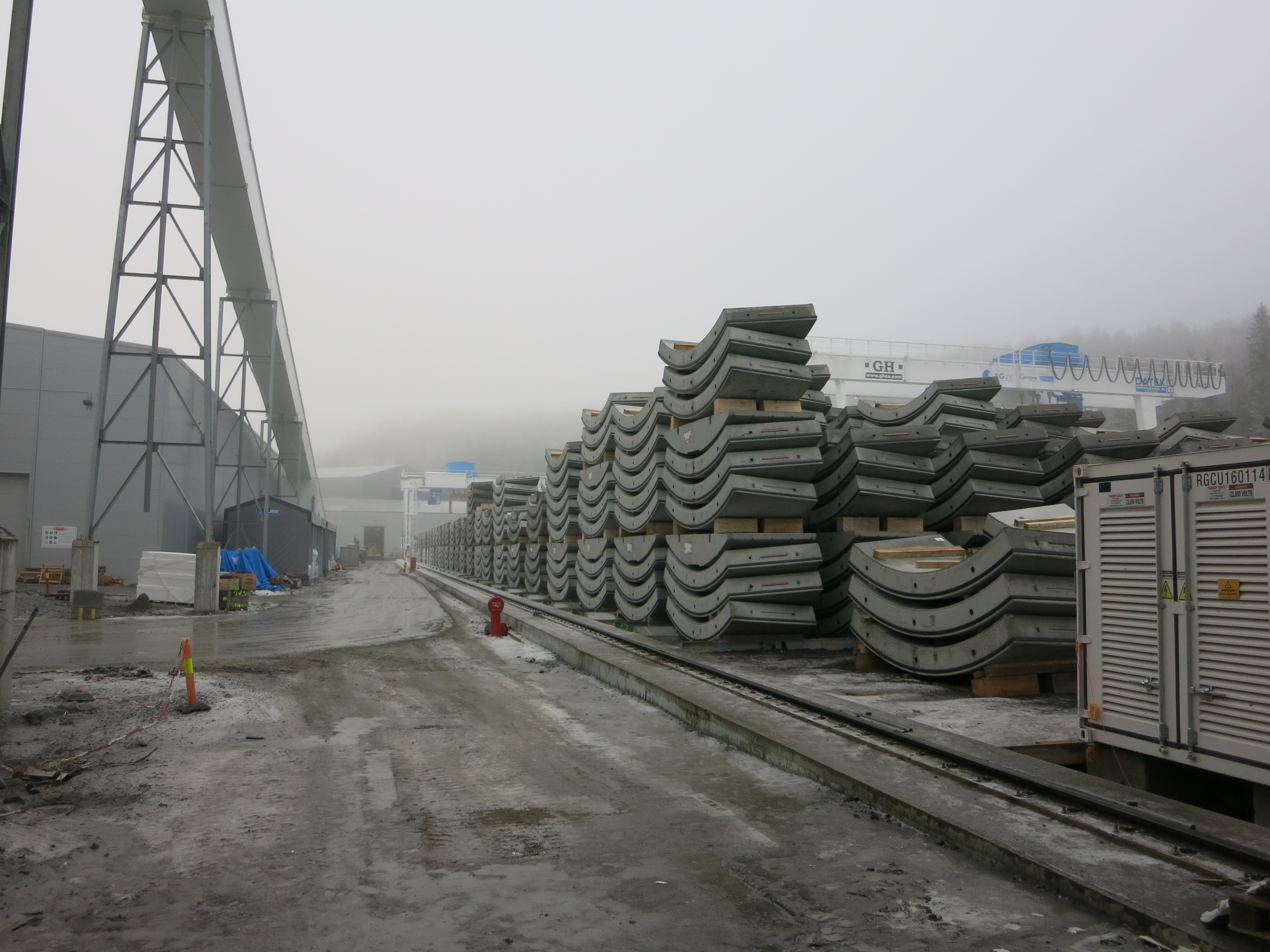
Imge taken from the facility where concrete elements are produced in huge amounts. At site the tunnel debris is recycled into concrete aggregates for the tunnel elements

Tunnel rock recycling is a method to process rock debris from tunneling into other usable needs. The most common is for concrete aggregates or as subbase for road building. Crushers and screeners normally used in quarries are stationed at the tunnel site for the purpose which is to crush and screen the rock debris for further use. The largest tunnel rock recycling facility ever to be created was for the construction of the Gotthard Base Tunnel which took 17 years, finishing in 2016. 1/5 of the rock debris excavated for the tunnel was recycled and used as aggregates for the concrete lining inside the tunnel.

In an average tunnel project the excavated rock is mostly regarded as waste. In most cases it is given away or used in a landfill. Starting up a facility for recycling the rock debris is hugely expensive. Though for a large project, as for example a double barrel tunnel longer than 20 km it is feasible. The Gotthard Base Tunnel was a 57 km long tunnel.

== Possibilities ==
Excavated rock utilized as concrete aggregate is beneficial both economically and environmentally. It could be of more value generating compared to using the excavated rock as landfill or filling up old quarries. Additionally, the need for transporting aggregate could be significantly reduced as the utilization of the rock could be placed close by a processing facility and a concrete batching plant. The investment cost of this facility would be repaid in the long run as the project would be close to self-supplied in construction aggregates.

== Tunneling methods ==
There are two main types of tunneling: Drill & Blast (D&B) and Tunnel Boring Machine (TBM). Both methods allow for recycling, if rock quality is approved. Both methods require some sort of processing. TBMs create rock particles with excessive amounts of fines; this is a problem affecting quality for both subbase and concrete aggregate. When using the tunnel excavation method D&B the particles can get up to 800 mm and there is a much coarser fraction, too large for subbase and concrete aggregate. The processing facility has the following choices to manipulate the rock mass: reduce rock size, remove fines, reduce moisture content add commercial gravel and sand to blend it with the recycled tunnel debris.

== Tunnel projects which have recycled tunnel rock ==
By 2018, there are seven confirmed projects worldwide which have accomplished recycling tunnel rock (TBM) on an industrial level. These projects are all placed in Western Europe and in hard rock. The concrete has either been used as shotcrete or concrete elements in TBM tunneling.

Project	Country	Year	Km	Million tons(metric)	Recycling[%]	Diameter(mm)	Reference
Zugwald	Switzerland	NA- 1998	9.5	1.2	16%	>16	
Gotthard Base Tunnel	Switzerland	1999-2016	57.1	28.7	23%	>0	
Koralm KAT2	Austria	2013-2023	21	8.6	17%	>16	
Follo line	Norway	2016-2021	19.5	9	10%*	>20	
Lötschberg	Switzerland	1999-2007	34.6	16	29.1%	>0	
Linthal	Switzerland	2010-2015	3.7	1	100%	>0	
Nant de Drance	Switzerland	2008-2016	5.5	1.14	25%	>0	

=== Conclusion ===
By the data from the table above it is on average possible to recycle 20% of the tunnel debris. The reason for the low percentage of recycled material is largely due to the large portion of filler created while drilling. In industrial concrete recipes there is no need for all this filler as it would destroy the flow of the concrete in its fresh state.

== Processing tunnel debris into aggregates ==
=== Crushing ===
The main role in processing tunnel rock is crushing the rocks into smaller sizes. Rock crushing is divided into two methods based on compression or impact resulting in different type of fragmentation of the material. Crushers are used in the aggregate and mineral industry and can also be divided into stationary and mobile plants. Setup of the crushers, feed size and speeds plays a major role in production of high quality construction aggregates. At a certain stage in the comminution, the rock material fragments down to free minerals grains as e.g. free Mica or Quartz minerals. In Figure below are the different crusher types listed. For cubification of the rock, the Vertical shaft impactor (VSI) is a suitable crusher. The technology lets the rocks collide with each other and split at the natural cleavage lines. This is favorable for both subbase and concrete aggregate.

=== Screening ===
In Tunnel boring machine (TBM) tunneling mechanical screening (scalping screener) is normally the first stage of the processing of tunnel rock. The screener removes rock particles below 16 or 20 mm diameter. This is to remove the high amounts of fines which is created when TBM tunneling in hard rock. Too much fines in concrete aggregates is unwanted.

=== Classification and dewatering ===
If a tunnel project want to create concrete aggregates as 0/8 mm or 0/4 mm fractions it requires a more advance processing facility. Classification covers the size control of particles < 1mm. Conventional screeners and crushers are not applicable below this size. A range of methods can be used for classification, though all built on certain fundamentals. These are utilizing the natural gravitational force and the particles corresponding behavior to separate the particles into fractions or dividing a liquid from particles (dewatering/clarifying). One type of classifier is the Air classifier. Classification accuracy will be of relevance as concrete aggregates do have boundary limits according to Particle-size distribution (grading) on Filler (materials) in the sand fraction. Particles in this size range do also tend to cluster together. These phenomena are called agglomeration and is unfortunate in terms of concrete batching. Removing fines is often done with water involved, this requires a water treatment plant to clean the water. This can be done with sedimentation tanks and filter press, requiring quite a lot of space. The water which is cleansed can go back into removing more fines from the tunnel rock, and the cycle continuous.

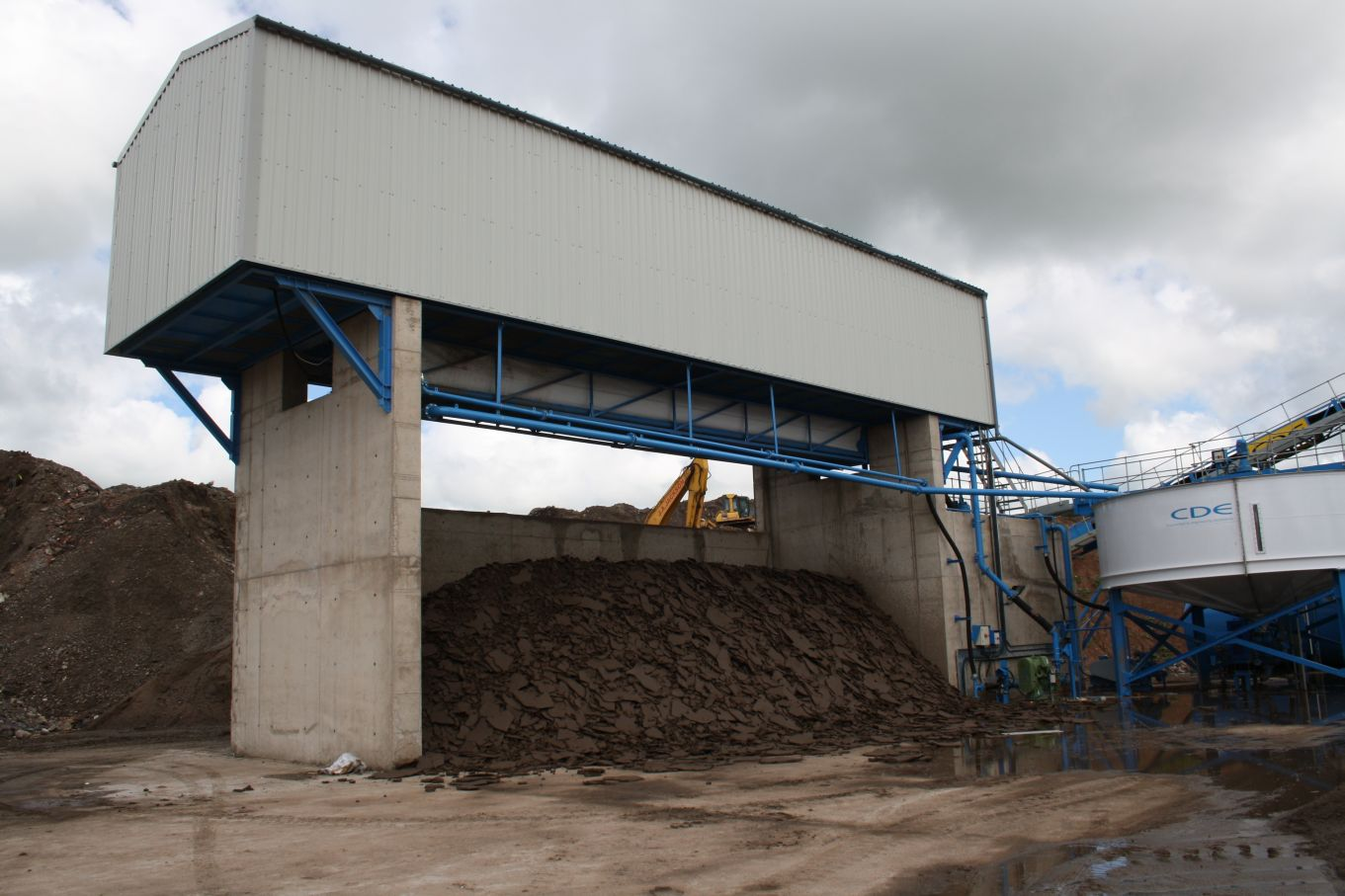
The filter press uses the sludge water and splits it into clean water and "filter cakes"

== Creating concrete with recycled aggregates ==
Recycling rock to produce concrete aggregate is a complex procedure and will require an on-site laboratory at the tunnel project. Concrete aggregate has strict requirement which must be tested, this can in some cases require between 5-15 different laboratory tests, regarding mechanical strength, grading and impurities.

The requirements of the aggregate from tunnel rock is tested and measured on the same level as concrete aggregate from quarries.

Owing to varying water flow through a rock massif it is normally an uncertainty as to what the moisture content of the rock material will be. This must be measured because it will affect the free water added during the concrete mixing, a high moisture content will require less free water to be added.

Rock	Measuring
Strength	Point load index; TBM required power consumption
Grading	Sieve analysis
Crushability/Wear	LCPC Micro-Deval
Fragmentation	Los Angeles abrasion test
Shape	Flakiness index Elongation index
Impurities	Alkali–silica reaction mica shist content Sulfur content moisture content
