= Mae Khong =

Coordinates: 18.1611°N 97.9173°E

Mae Khong แม่คง
- Subdistrict
- Interactive map of Mae Khong
- Country: Thailand
- Province: Mae Hong Son
- District: Mae Sariang

Population (2005)
  - Total: 4,154
- Time zone: UTC+7 (ICT)

Mae Khong (Thai: แม่คง) is a village and tambon (sub-district) of Mae Sariang District, in Mae Hong Son Province, Thailand. In 2005 it had a population of 4,154. The tambon contains 11 villages.
