= Don Pao =

Don Pao ดอนเปา
- Tambon
- Country: Thailand
- Province: Chiang Mai
- District: Mae Wang

Population (2005)
  - Total: 5,554
- Time zone: UTC+7 (ICT)

Don Pao (Thai: ดอนเปา) is a tambon (subdistrict) of Mae Wang District, in Chiang Mai Province, Thailand. In 2005, it had a population of 7,196 people. The tambon contains 10 villages.
