= Mae Yuam =

Coordinates: 18.1457°N 97.9224°E

Mae Yuam แม่ยวม
- Subdistrict
- Interactive map of Mae Yuam
- Country: Thailand
- Province: Mae Hong Son
- District: Mae Sariang

Population (2005)
  - Total: 9,273
- Time zone: UTC+7 (ICT)

Mae Yuam (Thai: แม่ยวม) is a village and tambon (sub-district) of Mae Sariang District, in Mae Hong Son Province, Thailand. In 2005 it had a population of 9,273. The tambon contains 13 villages.
