= Mae Wang district =

Mae Wang แม่วาง
- District
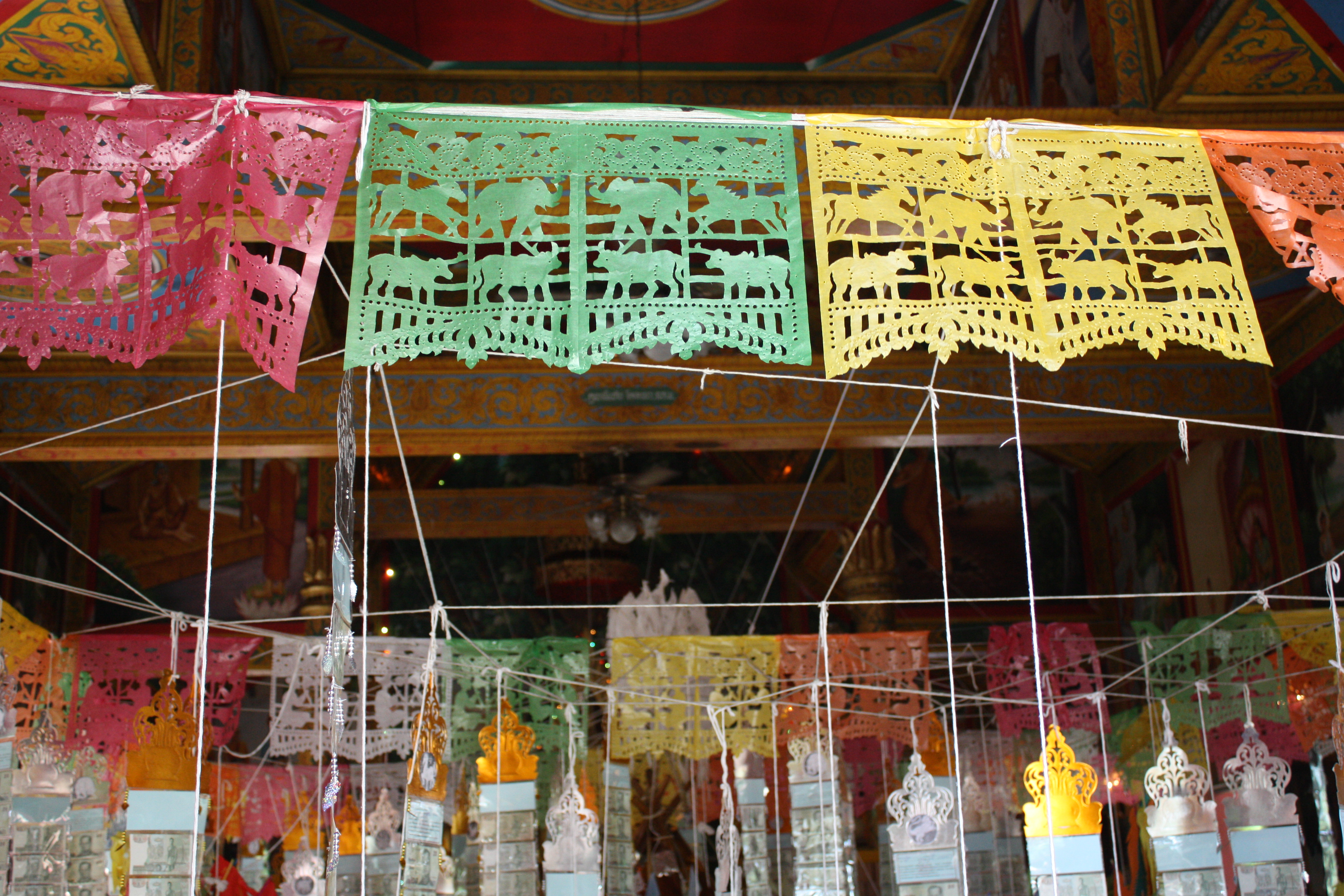
- Tung flags inside a temple in Mae Wang

- District location in Chiang Mai province
- Coordinates: 18°36′45″N 98°46′30″E
- Country: Thailand
- Province: Chiang Mai
- Seat: Ban Kat

Area
  - Total: 601.680 km^{2} (232.310 sq mi)

Population (2005)
  - Total: 30,871
  - Density: 51.3/km^{2} (133/sq mi)
- Time zone: UTC+7 (ICT)
- Postal code: 50360
- Geocode: 5022

Mae Wang (Thai: แม่วาง, pronounced [mɛ̂ː wāːŋ]) is a district (amphoe) in the central part of Chiang Mai province in northern Thailand. The largest settlement and administrative seat of Mae Wang is Ban Kad, a satellite town of Chiang Mai. Across Mae Wang district, the ethnic Hill Tribe people are more present than in other parts of Thailand. Groups with large populations in the district include the Karen people, Hmong and Akha peoples. In the lowlands near Ban Kad Thai people are more common, and as elevations increase on the Western slopes of Doi Inthanon, ethnic minorities become more common. Past Mae Sa Pok, on Rural Road 1013, The villages are almost exclusively Karen, with Hmong people living in higher elevations.

== Geography ==
Mae Wang district occupies the western slopes of Thanon Thong Chai Range (Pronounced "Tanon Tong Chai"), and elevations in the district increase towards Thailand's tallest mountain. The dominant feature of the district, and its namesake, the Mae Wang River, rises in the peaks and flows east towards Chiang Mai before eventually joining the Ping River on the border of Chiang Mai and Lamphun province.

The majority of the district's 30,000 people live in the valley of this river, and many weirs have been built along its course to irrigate rice fields. Near its source, a Hmong village renowned for its Sakura blossoms, Khun Wang, is home to Thailand's highest school.

Neighboring districts are (from the south clockwise) Doi Lo, Chom Thong, Mae Chaem, Samoeng, Hang Dong, and San Pa Tong of Chiang Mai Province.

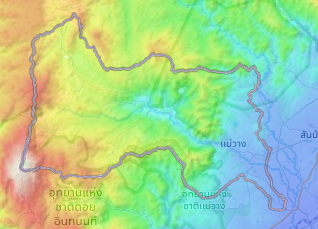
Topographic map of Mae Wang district

== Flora ==
Sapria Himalayana is a rare holo-parasitic flower related to Rafflesia. This particular specimen was found in Mae Wang District.

== History ==
The minor district (king amphoe) was established on 1 April 1990, when the four tambons Ban Kat, Thung Pi, Thung Ruang Thong, and Mae Win were split off from San Pa Tong district. On 7 September 1995, it was upgraded to a full district.

== Administration ==
The district is divided into five sub-districts (tambon), which are further subdivided into 62 villages (muban). Ban Kat is a township (thesaban tambon) which covers parts of tambons Ban Kat and Don Pao. There are a further five tambon administrative organizations (TAO).

No.	Name	Thai name	Villages	Pop.
1.	Ban Kat	บ้านกาด	13	5,544
2.	Thung Pi	ทุ่งปี้	12	4,602
3.	Thung Ruang Thong	ทุ่งรวงทอง	8	2,650
4.	Mae Win	แม่วิน	19	10,879
5.	Don Pao	ดอนเปา	10	7,196

== Gallery ==
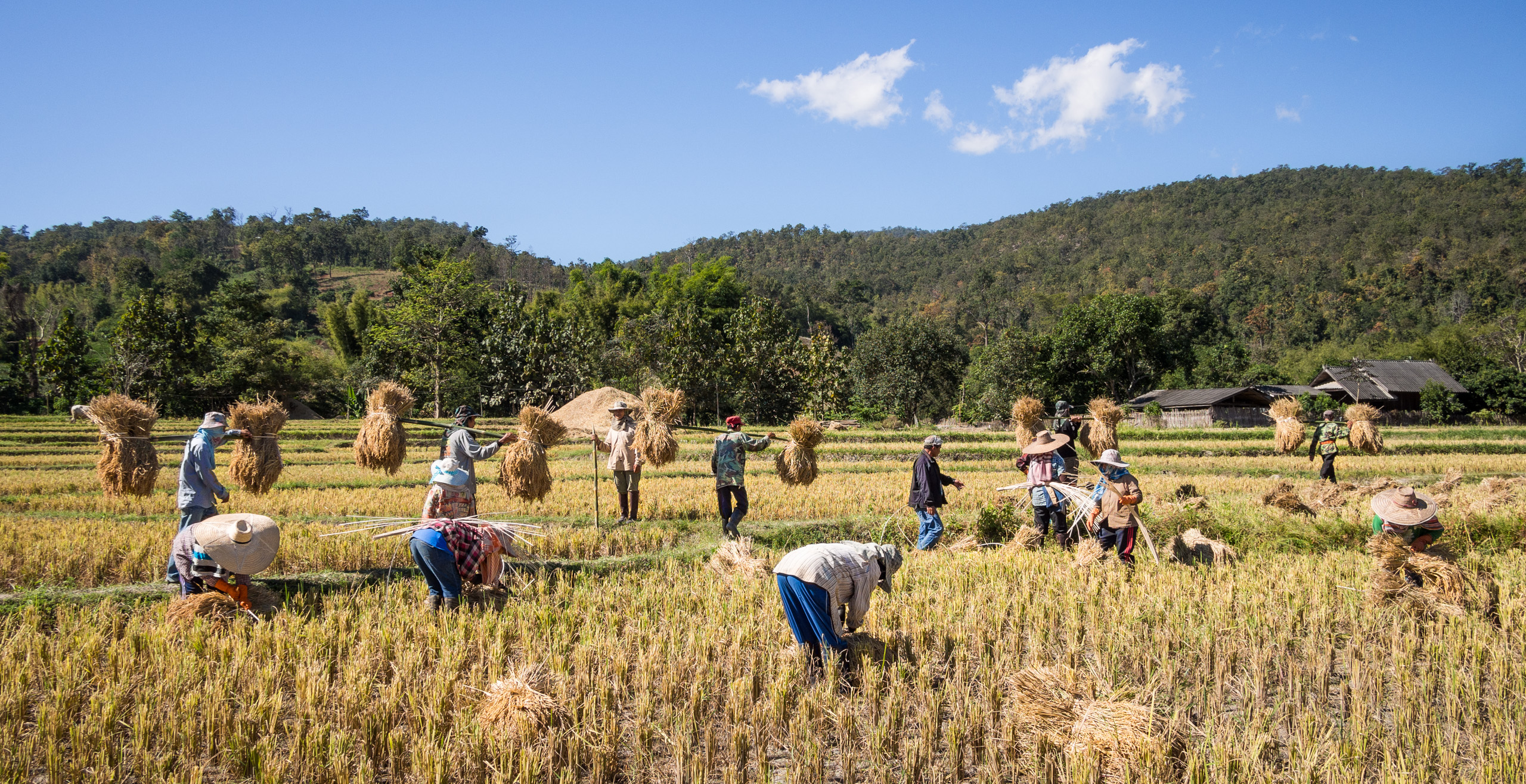
Rice farmers carrying bales of rice straw off paddy fields

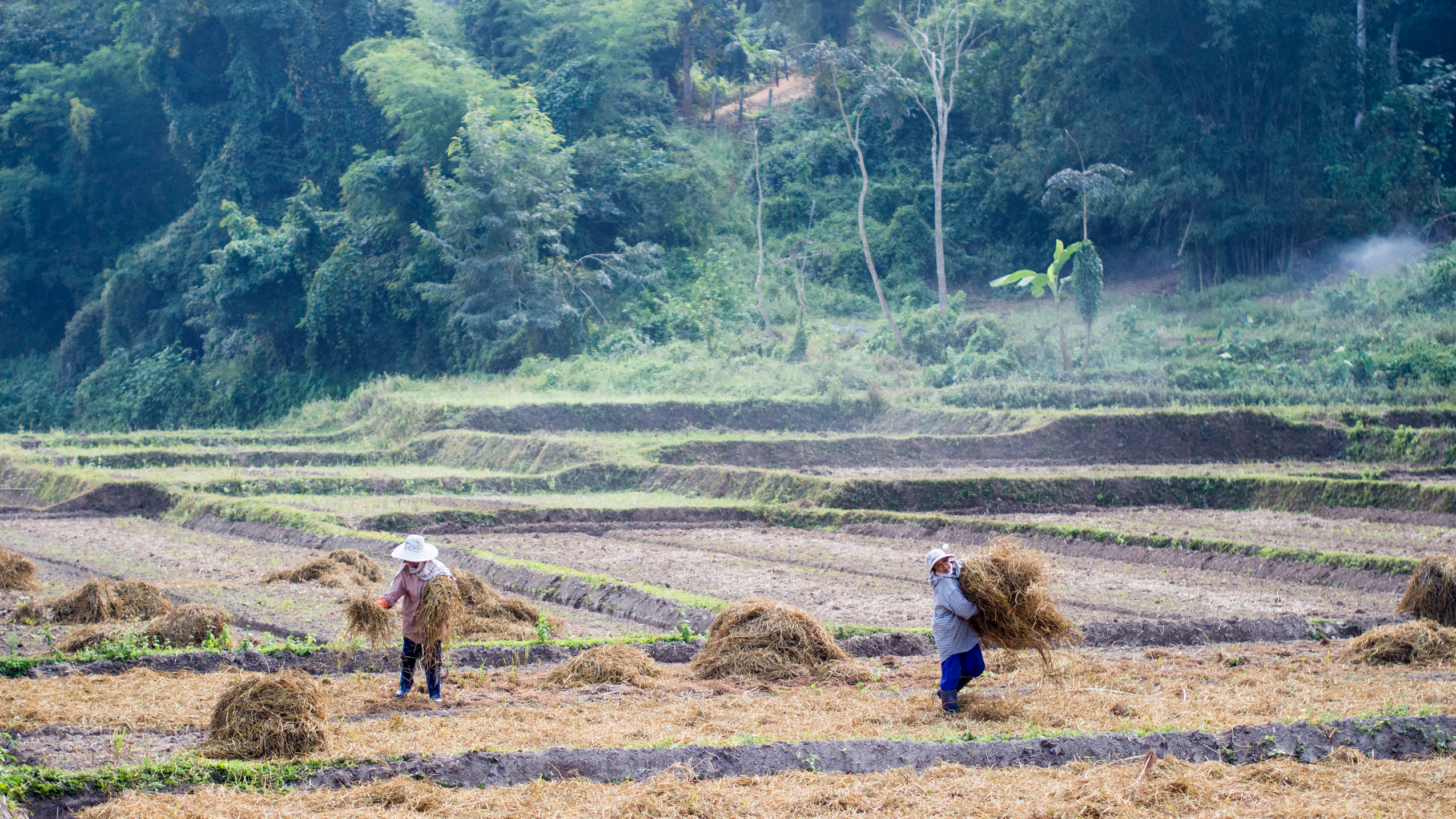
Straw is scattered over empty rice paddies during the cool, dry season
