= Mae Sariang subdistrict =

Mae Sariang แม่สะเรียง
- Subdistrict
- Location within Thailand
- Coordinates: 18°11′0″N 97°56′0″E
- Country: Thailand
- Province: Mae Hong Son
- District: Mae Sariang

Population (2005)
  - Total: 9,968
- Time zone: UTC+7 (ICT)

Mae Sariang Subdistrict (Thai: แม่สะเรียง) is a sub-district (tambon) of Mae Sariang District, in Mae Hong Son Province, Thailand. In 2005 it had a population of 9,968 people. The tambon contains nine villages.

Parts of sub-district Mae Sariang and of neighboring Ban Kat Sub-district form the Mae Sariang Sub-district Municipality.

== Geography ==
Mae Sariang lies in the valley of the Yuam River, which runs through the town from north to south. While the town itself is at an elevation of 192 metres (630 ft), the land rises much higher just to the east in the Thanon Thong Chai Range, with hills beside the city reaching over 800 metres (2,600 ft).

== Climate ==
Mae Sariang has a tropical savanna climate (Köppen climate classification Aw). Winters are dry and warm. Temperatures rise until April, which is very hot with the average daily maximum at 37.8 °C (100.0 °F). The monsoon season runs from May through October, with heavy rain and somewhat cooler temperatures during the day, although nights remain warm.

Climate data for Mae Sariang
Month	Jan	Feb	Mar	Apr	May	Jun	Jul	Aug	Sep	Oct	Nov	Dec	Year
Record high °C (°F)	36.1 (97.0)	38.8 (101.8)	41.5 (106.7)	43.0 (109.4)	42.7 (108.9)	37.5 (99.5)	38.7 (101.7)	36.4 (97.5)	38.5 (101.3)	36.6 (97.9)	35.6 (96.1)	35.0 (95.0)	43.0 (109.4)
Mean daily maximum °C (°F)	30.7 (87.3)	33.7 (92.7)	36.5 (97.7)	37.8 (100.0)	34.9 (94.8)	31.2 (88.2)	30.4 (86.7)	30.3 (86.5)	31.6 (88.9)	32.4 (90.3)	31.7 (89.1)	30.3 (86.5)	32.6 (90.7)
Daily mean °C (°F)	20.8 (69.4)	22.8 (73.0)	26.8 (80.2)	30.0 (86.0)	28.8 (83.8)	26.8 (80.2)	26.2 (79.2)	26.1 (79.0)	26.6 (79.9)	26.3 (79.3)	24.5 (76.1)	21.5 (70.7)	25.6 (78.1)
Mean daily minimum °C (°F)	13.2 (55.8)	13.1 (55.6)	17.1 (62.8)	22.0 (71.6)	23.9 (75.0)	23.4 (74.1)	23.0 (73.4)	23.0 (73.4)	23.0 (73.4)	22.1 (71.8)	19.3 (66.7)	15.2 (59.4)	19.9 (67.7)
Record low °C (°F)	3.3 (37.9)	6.2 (43.2)	9.4 (48.9)	13.8 (56.8)	19.2 (66.6)	20.8 (69.4)	20.7 (69.3)	20.6 (69.1)	19.7 (67.5)	13.4 (56.1)	6.5 (43.7)	5.0 (41.0)	3.3 (37.9)
Average precipitation mm (inches)	8 (0.3)	4 (0.2)	6 (0.2)	36 (1.4)	165 (6.5)	184 (7.2)	197 (7.8)	230 (9.1)	196 (7.7)	122 (4.8)	21 (0.8)	11 (0.4)	1,180 (46.4)
Average precipitation days (≥ 1.0 mm)	1	0	1	3	14	22	23	23	16	11	3	1	118
Source: NOAA (1961-1990)

== Transport ==
Mae Sariang is connected to the rest of Thailand by two main roads: Route 108, which enters Mae Sariang from the east (from Chiang Mai) and exits to the north (to Mae Hong Son); and Route 105, which leads south out of the town through Mae Sot to Mueang Tak.

Mae Sariang is served by Mae Sariang Airport.
