= Thung Pi =

Coordinates: 18.5861°N 98.8007°E

Thung Pi ทุ่งปี้
- Tambon
- Interactive map of Thung Pi
- Country: Thailand
- Province: Chiang Mai
- District: Mae Wang

Population (2005)
  - Total: 4,602
- Time zone: UTC+7 (ICT)

Thung Pi (Thai: ทุ่งปี้) is a tambon (subdistrict) of Mae Wang District, in Chiang Mai Province, Thailand. In 2005 it had a population of 4,602 people. The tambon contains 12 villages.
