= Mae Sariang district =

Mae Sariang แม่สะเรียง
- District
- District location in Mae Hong Son province
- Coordinates: 18°9′34″N 97°56′1″E
- Country: Thailand
- Province: Mae Hong Son
- Seat: Mae Sariang

Area
  - Total: 2,587.4 km^{2} (999.0 sq mi)

Population (2010)
  - Total: 50,937
  - Density: 20.1/km^{2} (52/sq mi)
- Time zone: UTC+7 (ICT)
- Postal code: 58110
- Geocode: 5804

Mae Sariang (Thai: แม่สะเรียง, pronounced [mɛ̂ː sā.rīa̯ŋ]) is a small town and district (amphoe) on the narrow valley along Yuam River in Mae Hong Son province, northern Thailand, along the Myanmar border. The areas around Mae Sariang are mountainous and forested; flat terrain that suits population or agriculture is scarce. The local population of Mae Sariang is of mixed origin. The main ethnicity in the low land plain, town center and its satellite villages along the river is Tai Yuan (Northern Thai or Lanna people) with some cross-marriage with other ethnicities. There are also Tai Yai or Shan people in the town center; they are among the first groups that inhabited the area. Red Karen and Karen descendants also reside in the town with a high density in the Christian quarter of the town. There is a sizable Bengali Muslim community and a mosque near the central market. The area has many links to Burma, such as its architecture and a large population of Burmese Muslims. Mae Sariang represents the westernmost area where Lanna culture and architecture dominated which also well assimilated with Burmese/ Shan.

== Geography ==
Neighboring districts are (from north clockwise): Mae La Noi of Mae Hong Son Province; Mae Chaem and Hot of Chiang Mai province; Sop Moei of Mae Hong Son province; and Kayin State and Kayah State of Myanmar.

Salawin National Park is in the district. The important river of Mae Sariang is the Yuam River.

== Climate ==
Climate data for Mae Sariang (1991–2020, extremes 1951-present)
Month	Jan	Feb	Mar	Apr	May	Jun	Jul	Aug	Sep	Oct	Nov	Dec	Year
Record high °C (°F)	35.8 (96.4)	39.6 (103.3)	42.1 (107.8)	42.8 (109.0)	42.7 (108.9)	39.2 (102.6)	36.3 (97.3)	36.2 (97.2)	36.8 (98.2)	37.1 (98.8)	37.1 (98.8)	37.1 (98.8)	42.8 (109.0)
Mean daily maximum °C (°F)	31.7 (89.1)	34.3 (93.7)	36.8 (98.2)	38.1 (100.6)	35.4 (95.7)	32.1 (89.8)	31.0 (87.8)	30.8 (87.4)	32.3 (90.1)	33.2 (91.8)	32.6 (90.7)	31.1 (88.0)	33.3 (91.9)
Daily mean °C (°F)	20.8 (69.4)	22.4 (72.3)	26.2 (79.2)	29.6 (85.3)	28.8 (83.8)	27.1 (80.8)	26.5 (79.7)	26.3 (79.3)	26.8 (80.2)	26.4 (79.5)	24.5 (76.1)	21.7 (71.1)	25.6 (78.1)
Mean daily minimum °C (°F)	14.2 (57.6)	13.9 (57.0)	17.7 (63.9)	22.4 (72.3)	23.9 (75.0)	23.6 (74.5)	23.2 (73.8)	23.1 (73.6)	23.1 (73.6)	22.2 (72.0)	19.3 (66.7)	15.9 (60.6)	20.2 (68.4)
Record low °C (°F)	3.3 (37.9)	6.2 (43.2)	10.8 (51.4)	15.5 (59.9)	19.9 (67.8)	21.2 (70.2)	20.1 (68.2)	20.4 (68.7)	19.8 (67.6)	15.2 (59.4)	6.5 (43.7)	3.3 (37.9)	3.3 (37.9)
Average precipitation mm (inches)	5.9 (0.23)	5.2 (0.20)	20.3 (0.80)	42.1 (1.66)	158.9 (6.26)	186.9 (7.36)	200.1 (7.88)	225.8 (8.89)	173.6 (6.83)	121.4 (4.78)	22.2 (0.87)	8.4 (0.33)	1,170.8 (46.09)
Average precipitation days (≥ 1.0 mm)	0.7	0.5	1.5	3.6	12.9	20.2	22.0	22.5	15.8	9.6	2.7	0.8	112.8
Average relative humidity (%)	77.3	69.5	62.2	62.0	73.6	83.3	85.4	86.4	84.7	83.4	81.0	79.4	77.4
Average dew point °C (°F)	15.9 (60.6)	15.2 (59.4)	17.0 (62.6)	20.4 (68.7)	23.0 (73.4)	23.8 (74.8)	23.6 (74.5)	23.7 (74.7)	23.8 (74.8)	23.1 (73.6)	20.5 (68.9)	17.3 (63.1)	20.6 (69.1)
Mean monthly sunshine hours	257.3	305.1	350.3	279.0	198.4	60.0	58.9	58.9	108.0	145.7	183.0	254.2	2,258.8
Mean daily sunshine hours	8.3	10.8	11.3	9.3	6.4	2.0	1.9	1.9	3.6	4.7	6.1	8.2	6.2
Source 1: World Meteorological Organization
Source 2: Office of Water Management and Hydrology, Royal Irrigation Department (sun 1981–2010)(extremes)

== History ==
In 1900 the administration in the area was formalized as a district under Mae Hong Son. Originally the district was named Mueang Yuam (เมืองยวม), which was changed in 1917 to Mae Sariang.

== Administration ==
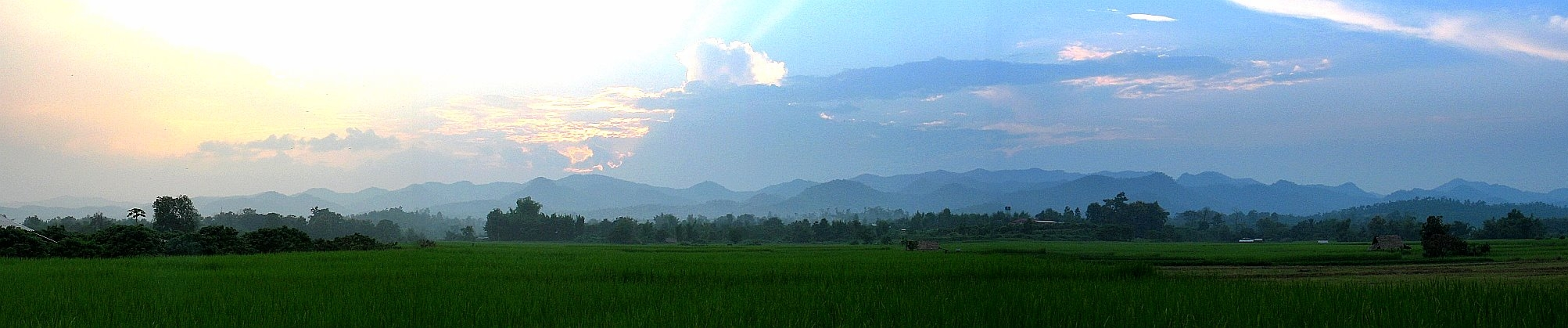
Mountains southwest of Mae Sariang

The district is divided into seven sub-districts (tambons), which are further subdivided into 77 villages (mubans). Mae Sariang is also a sub-district municipality (thesaban tambon) which covers parts of tambons Ban Kat and Mae Sariang. There are a further seven tambon administrative organizations (TAO).

No.	Name	Thai	Villages	Pop.
1.	Ban Kat	บ้านกาศ	13	11,283
2.	Mae Sariang	แม่สะเรียง	9	9,968
3.	Mae Khong	แม่คง	11	4,154
4.	Mae Ho	แม่เหาะ	13	7,813
5.	Mae Yuam	แม่ยวม	13	9,273
6.	Sao Hin	เสาหิน	6	2,691
8.	Pa Pae	ป่าแป๋	12	5,755

Number 7 is not used.
