= Bagan Sungai Burong =

Coordinates: 3°58′14.7″N 100°42′48.8″E

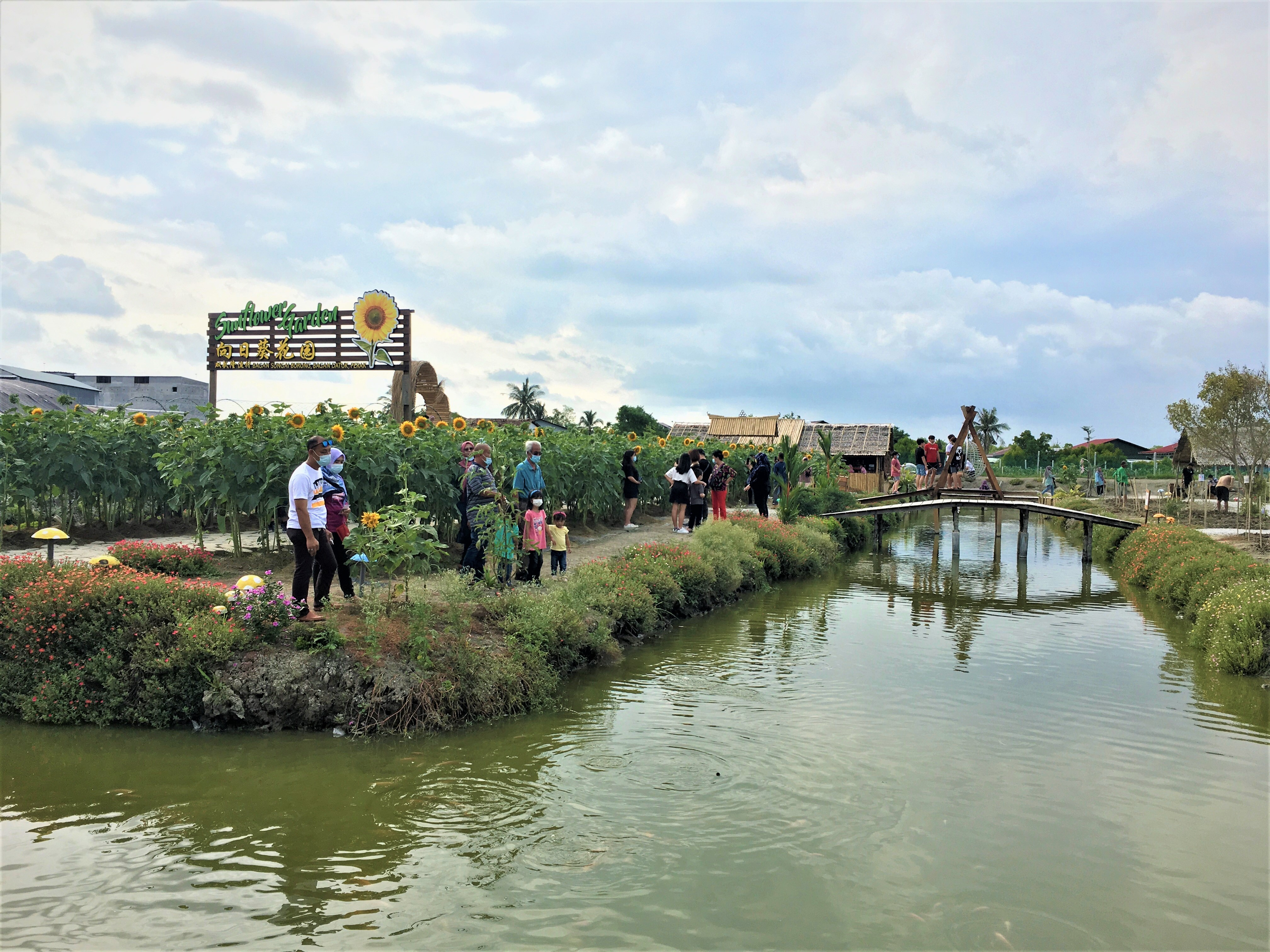
Sunflower Garden at Bagan Sungai Burong.

Bagan Sungai Burong is a small fishing village in Bagan Datuk District, Perak, Malaysia. Bagan Sungai Burong has a population about 300 people, mostly of Chaozhou (潮州) descent.

A Sunflower Garden was opened in Bagan Sungai Burong in 2020.
