= Kampong Luong =

Kampong Luong កំពង់លួង
- Village
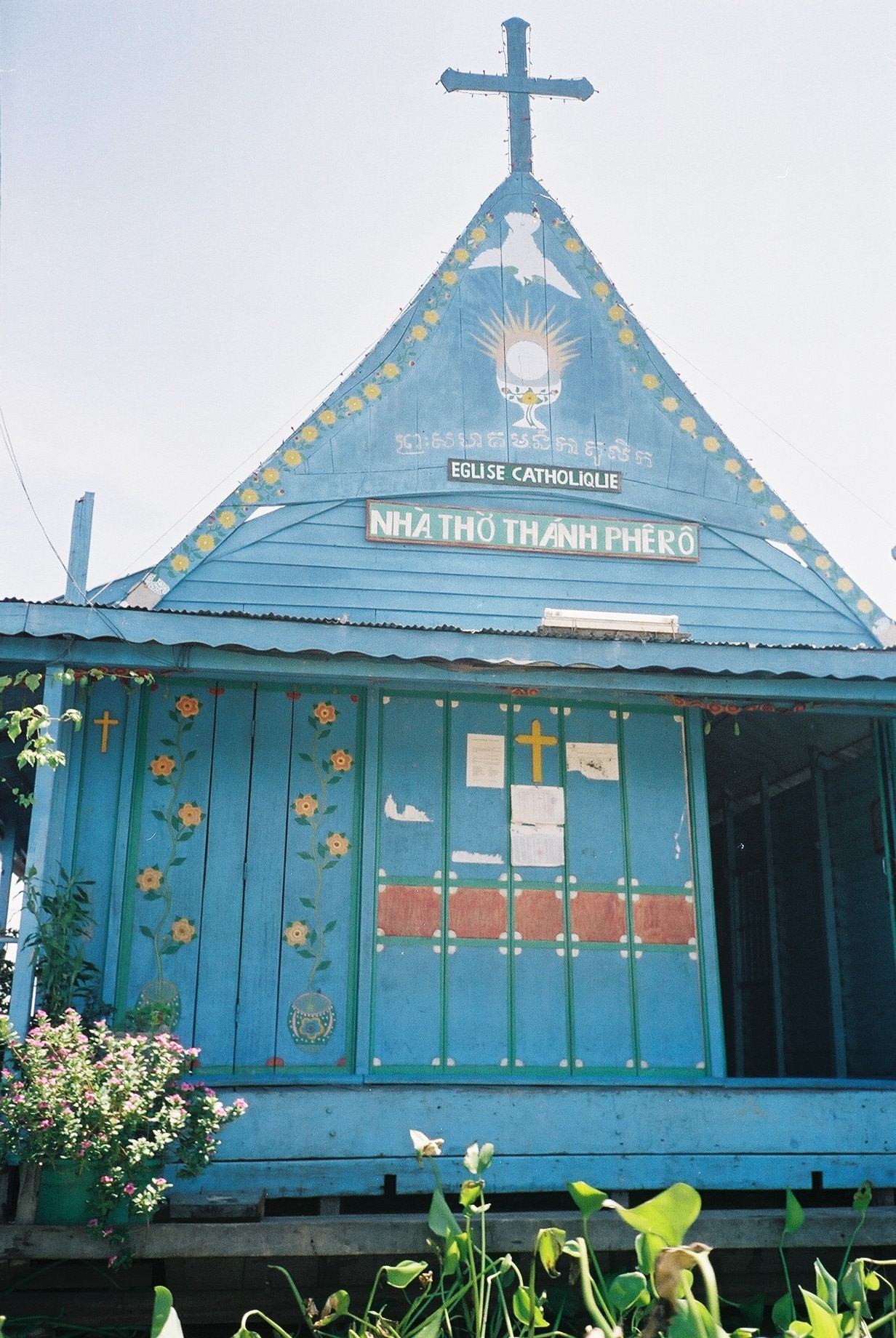
- Catholic floating church at Kampong Luong (attended by Vietnamese-speaking inhabitants)

- Location in Cambodia
- Coordinates: 12.5733°N 104.2084°E
- Country: Cambodia
- Province: Pursat Province
- District: Krakor District

Kompong Luong (or Phumĭ Kâmpóng Luŏng) is a large floating village north of Krakor, on Tonlé Sap Lake. Its distance from Krakor and NH5 can vary from two to seven kilometres (1 to 4 mi), with the seasonal expansion and shrinking of the lake. Most inhabitants are Vietnamese-speaking people.
