= Los Angeles abrasion test =

Standard for testing toughness of aggregate

The Los Angeles abrasion test (LA abrasion) is the North American standard for testing toughness (resistance to abrasion and degradation) of construction aggregate or gravel and its suitability for road construction. Test methodology and equipment is defined in the ASTM International publications ASTM C131 for particle sizes smaller than 37 mm (1.5 inches) and ASTM C535 for sizes larger than 19 mm (3/4 of an inch); the overlapping range of 19 to 37 mm can be tested by either of two standards.

The Los Angeles machine defined in the standard is a simple ball mill of specified size and shape The standard charge of rock is set at 2.5–5 kilograms (5.5–11.0 lb) depending on the size of the particles. The drum of the mill has a single shelf plate that scoops test samples and steel balls from the bottom, lifts them up and then drops them, creating a crushing impact. The interaction of the drum, steel balls and the samples at the bottom of the drum causes further abrading and grinding. The complete test requires 500 drum revolutions at a speed of 30–33 revolutions per minute. Crushed sample is then separated from fine dust on a sieve, washed, dried and weighed. The test reports loss of mass to abrasion and impact, expressed as a percentage of initial sample mass. Maximum acceptable loss for the base course of the road is 45%; the more demanding surface course must be 35% or less.

The test was developed by the city engineers of Los Angeles in the 1920s. The California Highway Commission found the new methodology superior to the established Deval abrasion test, and adopted the LA test in 1927. In the 1930s, national studies demonstrated the Deval test did not correlate with the service record of sampled rock altogether, while an LA loss rating of less than 40% was a reliable indicator of quality. The federal standard for LA abrasion testing was formally adopted by the ASTM in 1937. Decades later, field studies found that the LA test results do not always correlate with reality, thus engineers outside of the United States developed different national standards like the French wet micro-Deval procedure or the British Standard 812.
