= Ban Kat, Chiang Mai =

Ban Kat บ้านกาด
- Tambon
- Interactive map of Ban Kat
- Coordinates: 18.60381°N 98.79851°E
- Country: Thailand
- Province: Chiang Mai
- District: Mae Wang

Population (2005)
  - Total: 5,554
- Time zone: UTC+7 (ICT)

Ban Kat (Thai: บ้านกาด) is a tambon (subdistrict) of Mae Wang District, in Chiang Mai Province, Thailand. In 2005, it had a population of 5,554 people. The tambon contains 13 villages.
