= Ban Kat, Mae Hong Son =

Ban Kat บ้านกาด
- Subdistrict
- Interactive map of Ban Kat
- Coordinates: 18.176361°N 97.933930°E
- Country: Thailand
- Province: Mae Hong Son
- District: Mae Sariang

Population (2005)
  - Total: 11,283
- Time zone: UTC+7 (ICT)

Ban Kat (Thai: บ้านกาด) is a village and tambon (sub-district) of Mae Sariang District, in Mae Hong Son Province, Thailand. In 2005, it had a population of 11,283 people. The tambon contains 13 villages.
