= Samuel Gardiner =

Samuel Gardiner may refer to:

- Samuel Gardiner (author) (born 1560s)
- Samuel Rawson Gardiner (1829–1902), historian

== See also ==
- Sam Gardiner (disambiguation)
- Samuel Gardner (disambiguation)
