= Sam Gardiner (disambiguation) =

Sam Gardiner (1940–2022) was a Northern Irish politician.

Sam Gardiner may also refer to:

- Sam Gardiner (bowls) (1888–1968), English-born Canadian international lawn bowler
- Sam Gardiner (poet) (1936–2016), Northern Irish poet and writer
- Sam Gardiner, a contestant on series 2 of Race Across the World

== See also ==
- Samuel Gardiner (disambiguation)
- Sam Gardner (disambiguation)
