= Robert Fletcher (writer) =

English Writer

Robert Fletcher (fl. 1586) was an English verse writer.

== Life ==
Fletcher seems to be identical with a student of Merton College, Oxford, who came from Warwickshire, proceeded B.A. in 1564, and M.A. in 1567. He was admitted a fellow in 1563, but in 1569 quarrelled with Thomas Bickley, the new warden. "For several misdemeanors he was turned out from his fellowship of that house (i.e. Merton) in June 1569", and became schoolmaster at Taunton. Later he was a preacher. (Anthony Wood).

== Works ==
Fletcher wrote two works:

- An Introduction to the Looue of God. Accoumpted among the workes of St. Augustine, and translated into English by Edmund [Freake], bishop of Norwich that nowe is … and newlie turned into Englishe Meter by Rob. Fletcher, London (by Thomas Purfoot), 1581, dedicated to Sir Francis Knollys.
- The Song of Solomon, in English verse, with annotations, London, by Thomas Chard, 1586.

A third book by a Robert Fletcher, who may be identical with the author of the two former volumes, is The Nine English Worthies … beginning with King Henrie the first, and concluding with Prince Henry, eldest sonne to our soueraigne Lord the King, London, 1606, dedicated to Henry Frederick, Prince of Wales, and to the Earls of Oxford and Essex, "and other young lords attending the princes highnesse". Fletcher commends Roger Ascham's advice as to the need of learning in men of high rank. Prefatory verse is contributed by R. Fenne, Thomas, Lord Windsor, Sir Will. Whorewood, John Wideup, Jo. Guilliams, Paul Peart, and others. A brief life of each monarch in prose is followed by an epitaph in verse, except in the last case, where the life is wholly in verse.
