= Sam Gardner =

Sam Gardner may refer to:

- Sam Gardner (soccer) (born 1997), Canadian soccer player
- Sam Gardner (Atypical), fictional character in comedy-drama TV series Atypical
- Samwise Gamgee, fictional gardener of Frodo Baggins' in J. R. R. Tolkien's Middle-earth

== See also ==
- Samuel Gardner (disambiguation)
- Sam Gardiner (disambiguation)
