= Race Across the World series 3 =

Third series of Race Across the World

Race Across the World
- Series 3
- Presented by: John Hannah (narrator)
- No. of days: 51
- No. of contestants: 10
- Winners: Cathie Rowe and Tricia Sail
- No. of legs: 8
- Distance traveled: 16,000 km (9,900 mi)
- No. of episodes: 9

Release
- Original network: BBC One
- Original release: 22 March – 10 May 2023

Season chronology
- ← Previous; Series 2 Next → Series 4

The third series of Race Across the World began airing on 22 March 2023. Unlike the transcontinental races in previous series, the race took place entirely in Canada between Vancouver, British Columbia and St. John's, Newfoundland and Labrador. Each two-person team was required to cross the country on a 16,000-kilometre (9,900 mi) route without using air travel, and was given a budget equal to the cost of the air fare. Contestants were provided a map, GPS tracker, travel guide, and bear spray.

Start and end points
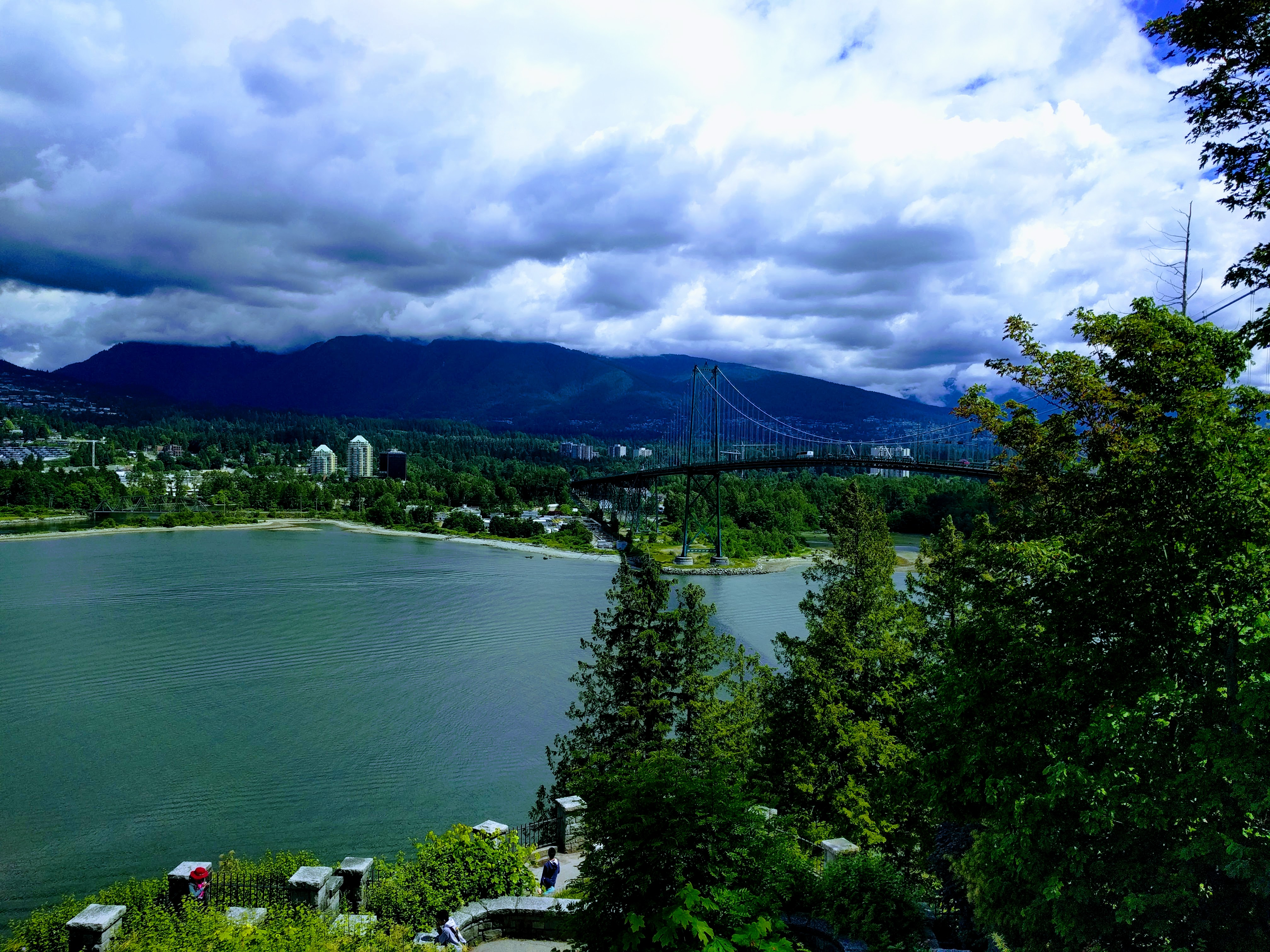
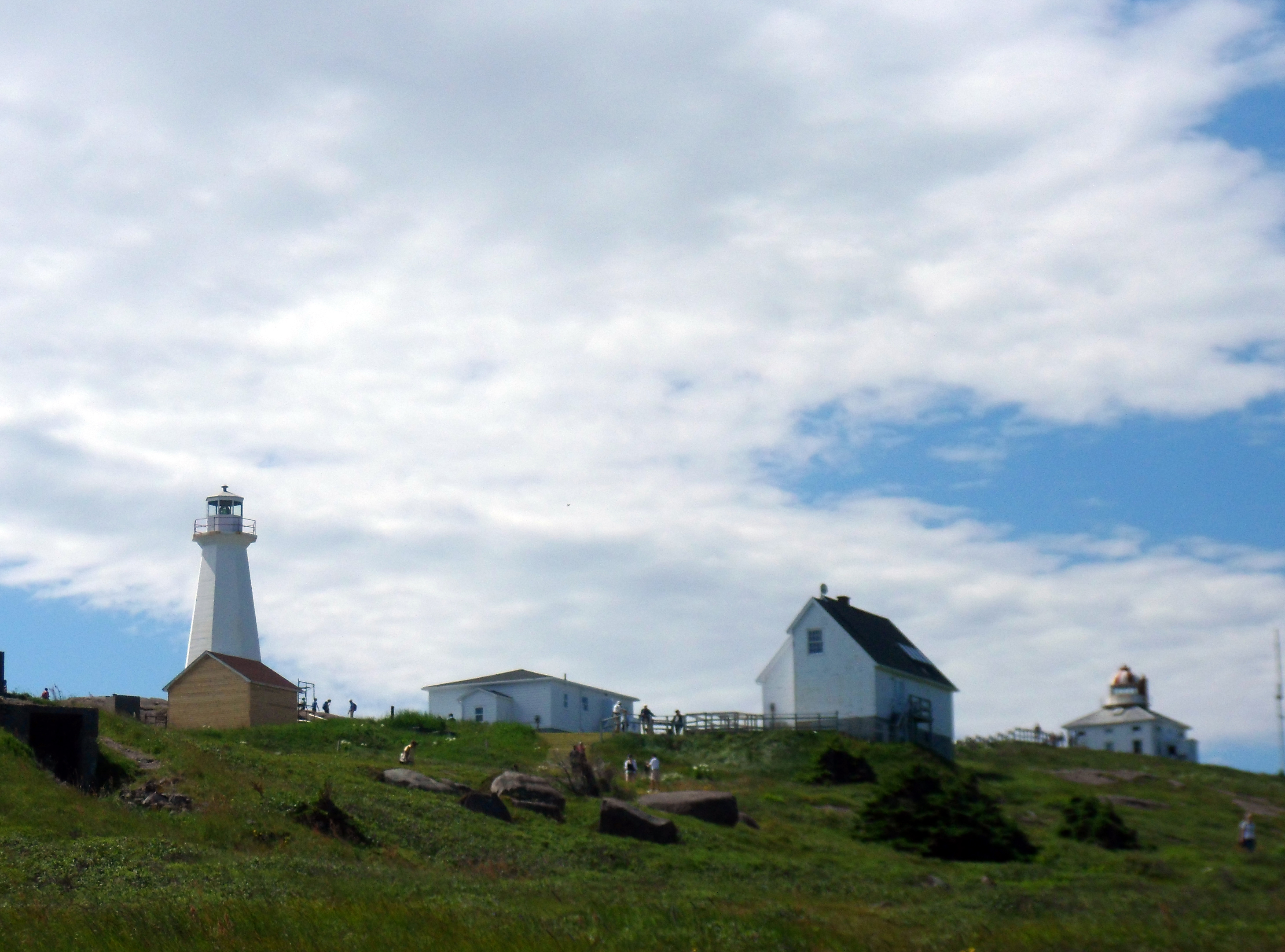
Prospect Point in Stanley Park, Vancouver (top) and Cape Spear, Newfoundland (bottom)

On 28 September 2022, the BBC announced that the programme was due to enter production later that year, and would move from BBC Two to BBC One. In early 2023, the BBC revealed the five pairs of competitors as Cathie and Tricia, Claudia and Kevin, Ladi and Monique, Marc and Michael, and Mobeen and Zainib.

== Overview ==
The third series of Race Across the World was set entirely within Canada between Vancouver and Newfoundland, with air travel prohibited. The race had seven checkpoints with enforced rest periods, with contestants only finding the next destination on departure from the checkpoints and the first team to arrive at the final checkpoint at Cape Spear would win £20,000.

Teams were given a budget of £2,498.13 per person – the equivalent air fare for travelling the race route. Contestants were not permitted to subsidise their budgets, but short-term opportunities allowed them to work for money or accommodation. Contestants were not given access to telephones or internet.

== Contestants ==
Main source: BBC

Name	Relationship	Occupation	Age	From	Ref.
Cathie Rowe	Lifelong friends	Director, local pharmacy	49	Bridgend	
Tricia Sail	Lifelong friends	Bank clerk	48	Devon	
Claudia Dawkins	Father and daughter	Product development and buying	27	Southampton	
Kevin Dawkins	Father and daughter	Marine canopy maker	53	Southampton	
Ladi Ajayi	Father and daughter	Sport and physical activity professional	52	Essex	
Monique Ajayi	Father and daughter	Event manager	25	East London	
Marc	Brothers	Lift operator	36	Tamworth	
Michael	Brothers	Manager, children's services	34	West Midlands	
Mobeen Qureshi	Husband and wife	Orthopedic surgeon	31	Manchester	
Zainib Khan	Husband and wife	Psychiatrist	32	Manchester, originally from Glasgow	

== Results summary ==
Colour key:

Team withdrawn
Team eliminated
Series winners

Teams	Position (by leg)							
Teams	1	2	3	4	5	6	7	8
Tricia & Cathie	2nd	1st	1st	3rd	3rd	4th	2nd	Winners
Mobeen & Zainib	3rd	3rd	2nd	2nd	4th	1st	1st	2nd
Monique & Ladi	4th	2nd	4th	4th	2nd	3rd	3rd	3rd
Claudia & Kevin	1st	5th	3rd	1st	1st	2nd	4th	
Marc & Michael	5th	4th	5th					

== Route ==
The checkpoints in the third series were:

Leg	From	To	Ref
1	Prospect Point; Stanley Park, Vancouver, British Columbia	Haida House; Tlell, Haida Gwaii, British Columbia	
2	Haida House; Tlell, Haida Gwaii, British Columbia	Bombay Peggy's Inn; Dawson City, Yukon	
3	Bombay Peggy's Inn; Dawson City, Yukon	Sulphur Mountain; Banff, Alberta	
4	Sulphur Mountain; Banff, Alberta	Polar Bear Inn; Churchill, Manitoba	
5	Polar Bear Inn; Churchill, Manitoba	Twin Peaks Bed and Breakfast; Mindemoya, Manitoulin Island, Ontario	
6	Twin Peaks Bed and Breakfast; Mindemoya, Manitoulin Island, Ontario	Le Capitole Hôtel; Quebec City, Quebec	
7	Le Capitole Hôtel; Quebec City, Quebec	White Point Beach Resort; Liverpool, Nova Scotia	
8	White Point Beach Resort; Liverpool, Nova Scotia	Cape Spear; St. John's, Newfoundland and Labrador	

Checkpoints on Series 3: Checkpoint, Start, Finish

== Race summary ==
Mode of transportation	Rail Ship Bus/coach Taxi Road vehicle Self-drive vehicle (paid) RV
Activity	Working for money and/or bed and board Excursion that cost time and/or money

=== Leg 1: Vancouver, British Columbia → Haida Gwaii, British Columbia ===
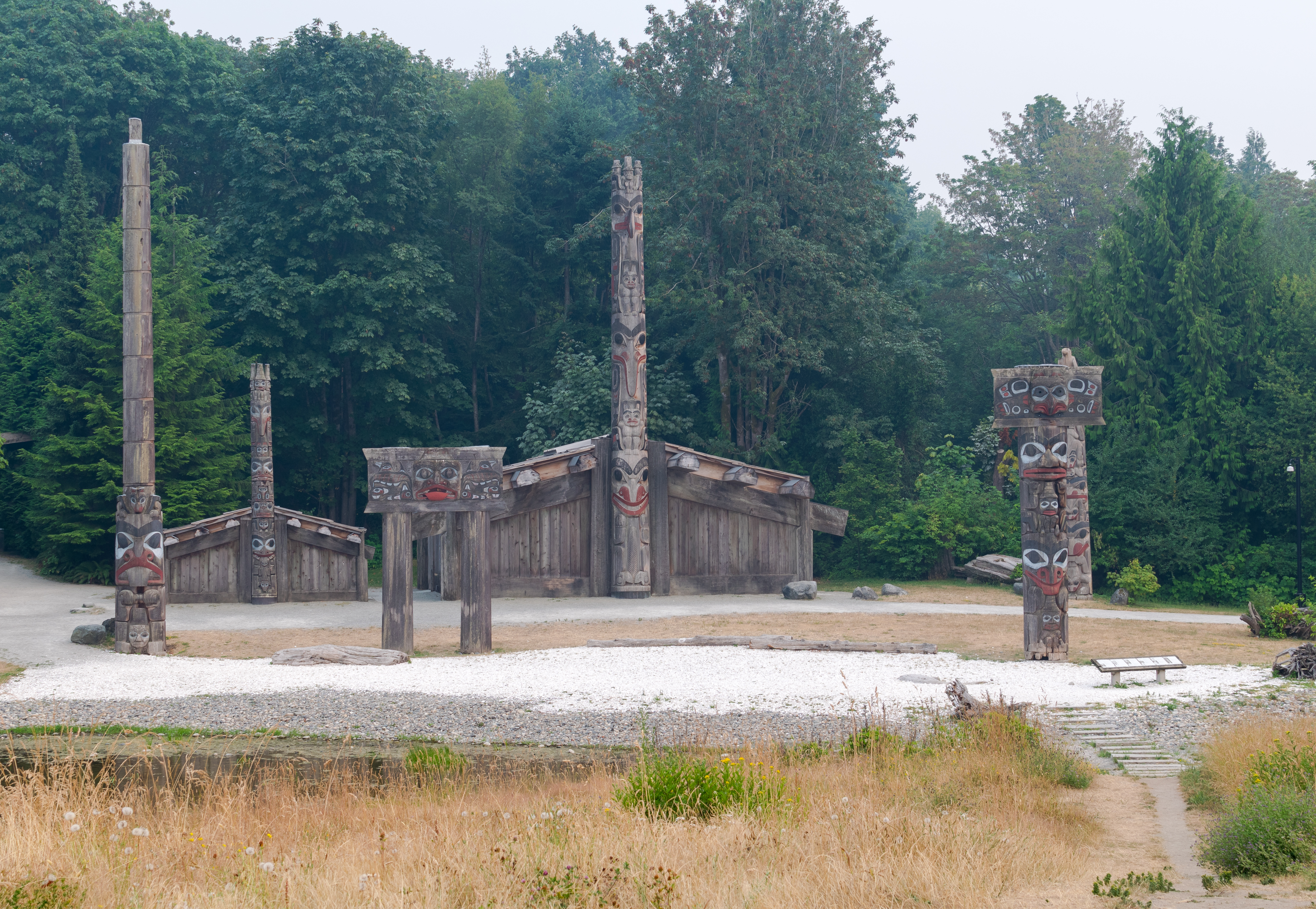
Haida House, Tlell, Graham Island, British Columbia, Canada

The race started at 2 pm from Prospect Point in Stanley Park, Vancouver with the first leg finishing 750 kilometres (470 mi) north at Haida House at Tllaal, just outside the village of Tlell on the east coast of Graham Island in the Haida Gwaii archipelago.

Three teams opted to cross the Strait of Georgia, from Horseshoe Bay to Nanaimo on Vancouver Island pursuing a strategy that would involve multiple sea crossings to eventually reach Graham Island. The remaining two teams chose to remain on the mainland, favouring an overland route with an eye to crossing the Hecate Strait by catching a ferry to Graham Island departing from Prince Rupert.

Tricia and Cathie spent several hours trying to get out of Stanley Park and into the city. With daylight fading, they spent their first night at a hostel in Vancouver, only a few miles from the starting point. On Day 2 they chopped logs on a farm in Merritt in exchange for bed and board.

Having hitched a lift into Vancouver, Zainib and Mobeen opted to take a coach to Whistler. Discovering that there was no longer any public transport from the resort onward to Prince Rupert, they considered backtracking to Vancouver. Whilst in the resort, they worked in a shop and took a skiing lesson.

Claudia and Kevin missed their coach by 45 minutes and became stuck in Campbell River on Vancouver Island. They decided to take a very expensive long-distance taxi to Port Hardy, and made back some money by cleaning a boat on Day 3. With another day before the sailing, they chose to experience the wilderness looking for bears before they caught the ferry to Prince Rupert. They took another long-distance taxi ride once they arrived on Graham Island, reducing their starting funds by almost a quarter.

Marc and Michael headed south after their first night in a motel on Vancouver Island. They worked the land on a farm for a couple of days before securing a ride northwards. In the meantime, Monique and Ladi spent some downtime whilst in Telegraph Cove observing aquatic wildlife.

All five teams boarded the same ferry crossing the Hecate Strait from the Port of Prince Rupert to Skidegate, Graham Island on Day 6. The leg culminated in a race to the first checkpoint, with all teams arriving at Haida House within a few minutes of each other.

Order	Teams	Route	Hours behind leaders	Money left
1	Claudia & Kevin	Stanley Park → Horseshoe Bay → Nanaimo → Campbell River → Port Hardy (Great Bear Rainforest) → Prince Rupert → Skidegate → Tlell	—N/a	78%
2	Tricia & Cathie	Stanley Park → Vancouver → Merritt → Prince George → Prince Rupert → Skidegate → Tlell	2 minutes	91%
3	Zainib & Mobeen	Stanley Park → Vancouver → Whistler → Cache Creek → Prince George → Prince Rupert → Skidegate → Tlell	4 minutes	88%
4	Monique & Ladi	Stanley Park → Horseshoe Bay → Nanaimo → Campbell River → Telegraph Cove → Port Hardy → Prince Rupert → Skidegate → Tlell	15 minutes	85%
5	Marc & Michael	Stanley Park → Horseshoe Bay → Nanaimo → Victoria → Port Hardy → Prince Rupert → Skidegate → Tlell	17 minutes	85%

=== Leg 2: Haida Gwaii, British Columbia → Dawson City, Yukon ===
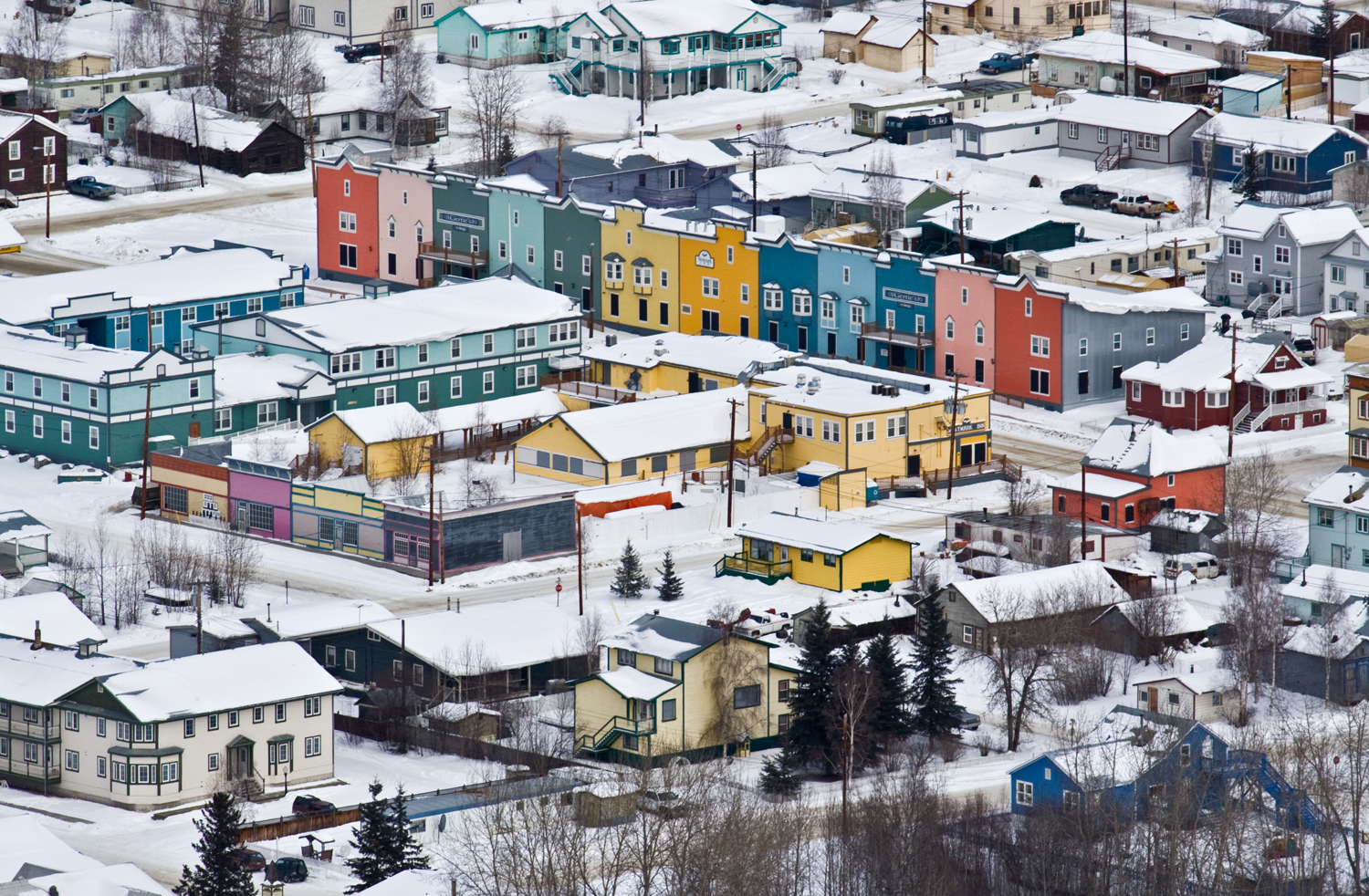
Dawson City, Yukon, Canada

The race continued from Tlell to former gold rush town of Dawson City almost 2,000 kilometres (1,200 mi) to the north, in the Yukon.

At the start of the second leg, all five teams had to backtrack to Prince Rupert on the mainland using almost the same means of transport as they had used to reach Tlell. With only a matter of minutes separating their restart, they all arrived on the mainland on the same ferry at the same time on Day 10.

Tricia and Cathie took a bus to Terrace and hired a car onward to Whitehorse. They stopped en route in Jade City to work dismantling an old shack for free bed and board. Marc and Michael also rented a car from Terrace, but detoured to go rafting at Haines Junction on the Dezadeash River before continuing to Whitehorse.

The other three teams hitched lifts with vehicles travelling north. Monique and Ladi secured rides all the way to Whitehorse but stopped en route at Bear Glacier Provincial Park.

Zainib and Mobeen were the first into the Yukon, but detoured to Burwash Landing to work cleaning a light aircraft in exchange for a flight in it over Kluane National Park. Claudia and Kevin also decided to take a job, cleaning at some kennels for free bed, board and sauna. Both teams found themselves at the same fuel stop on the outskirts of Whitehorse attempting to hitch a lift northwards on the Klondike Highway.

Order	Teams	Route	Hours behind leaders	Money left
1	Tricia & Cathie	Tlell → Skidegate → Prince Rupert → Terrace → (Jade City) → Whitehorse → Carmacks → Dawson City	—N/a	73%
2	Monique & Ladi	Tlell → Skidegate → Prince Rupert → Kitwanga → (Bear Glacier Provincial Park) → Whitehorse → Dawson City	25	76%
3	Zainib & Mobeen	Tlell → Skidegate → Prince Rupert → Kitwanga → Dease Lake → Burwash Landing → Whitehorse → Dawson City	26.5	72%
4	Marc & Michael	Tlell → Skidegate → Prince Rupert → Terrace → (Haines Junction) → Whitehorse → Dawson City	45	65%
5	Claudia & Kevin	Tlell → Skidegate → Prince Rupert → Meziadin Lake → Watson Lake → Whitehorse → Dawson City	46	61%

=== Leg 3: Dawson City, Yukon → Banff, Alberta ===
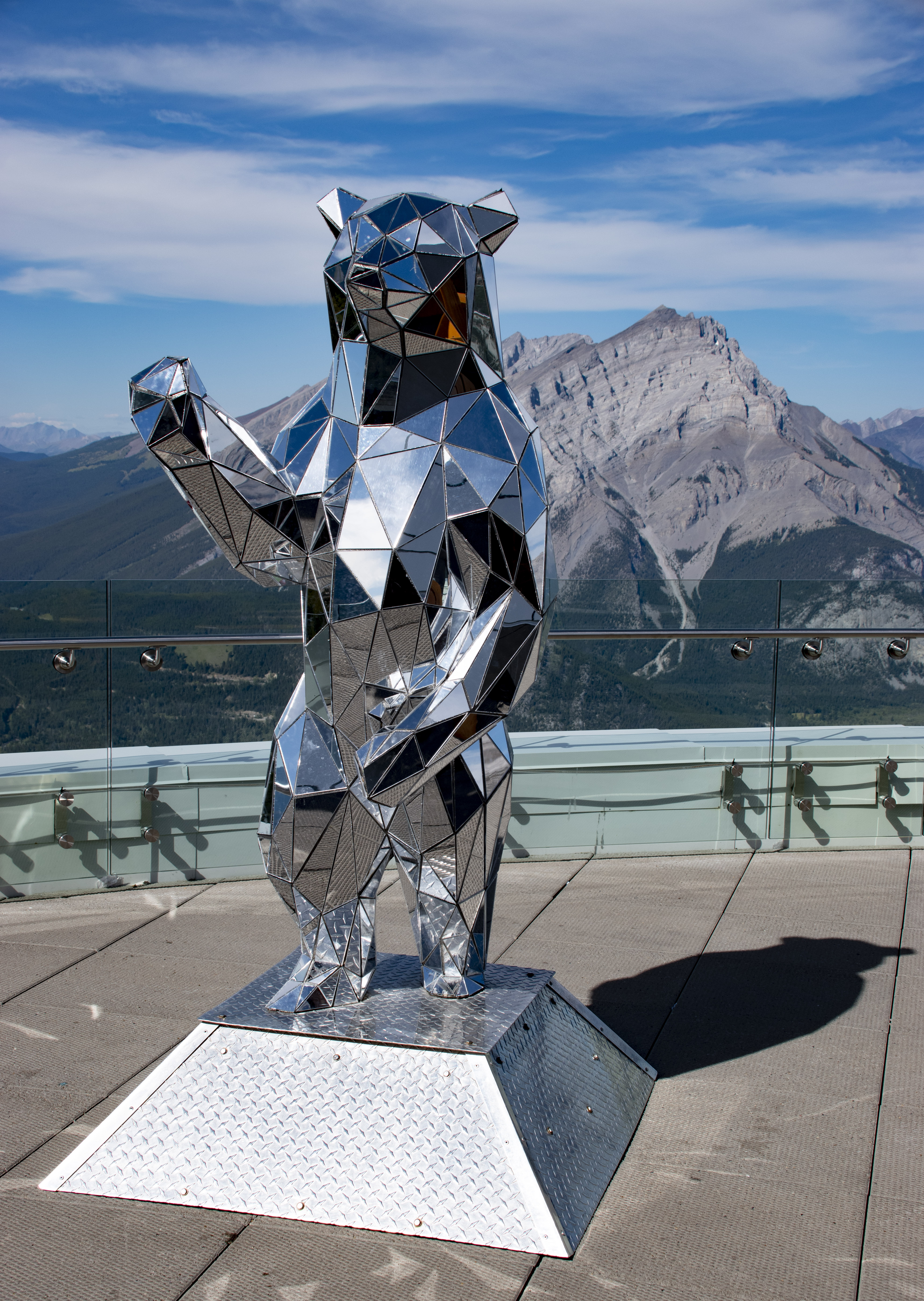
Sulphur Mountain, Banff, Alberta, Canada

The race restarted on Day 15 from Dawson City to the Rocky Mountain resort of Banff in the province of Alberta, some 2,700 kilometres (1,700 mi) distant, with the team finishing last facing elimination.

All teams found that they must head back south along the Klondike Highway. Leaders Tricia and Cathie were first to depart, doing so before the final two teams had even arrived in Dawson City. Their lead allowed them time to earn money working at the Grande Prairie Stompede, but they found themselves stranded there for a further 22 hours.

Whilst in Dawson City, Monique suffered an injury requiring stitches. Struggling to walk properly, this delayed her and Ladi's restart by three-and-a-half hours. Despite the setback, they headed to the same RV hire company in Whitehorse as Zainib and Mobeen, where both teams managed to secure RVs that needed repositioning to Edmonton at no cost. En route, Monique and Ladi took casual cleaning work at Grande Prairie, and Zainib and Mobeen worked preparing dough for Green Onion Cakes in Edmonton.

Claudia and Kevin had a free one-way self drive towards Edmonton courtesy of a family with whom they had hitched a ride from Dawson City to Whitehorse. They camped at Muncho Lake before heading towards Fort St. John to work at a craft brewery.

Order	Teams	Route	Hours behind leaders	Money left
1	Tricia & Cathie	Dawson City → Watson Lake → Fort Nelson → Grande Prairie → Jasper → Lake Louise → Banff	—N/a	58%
2	Zainib & Mobeen	Dawson City → Whitehorse → Edmonton → Calgary → Banff	4	61%
3	Claudia & Kevin	Dawson City → Whitehorse → (Fort St. John) → Spruce Grove → Banff	5.5	49%
4	Monique & Ladi	Dawson City → Whitehorse → (Grande Prairie) → Edmonton → Banff	7	62%
5	Marc & Michael	Dawson City → Whitehorse → Watson Lake → Fort Nelson → Dawson Creek		

=== Leg 4: Banff, Alberta → Churchill, Manitoba ===
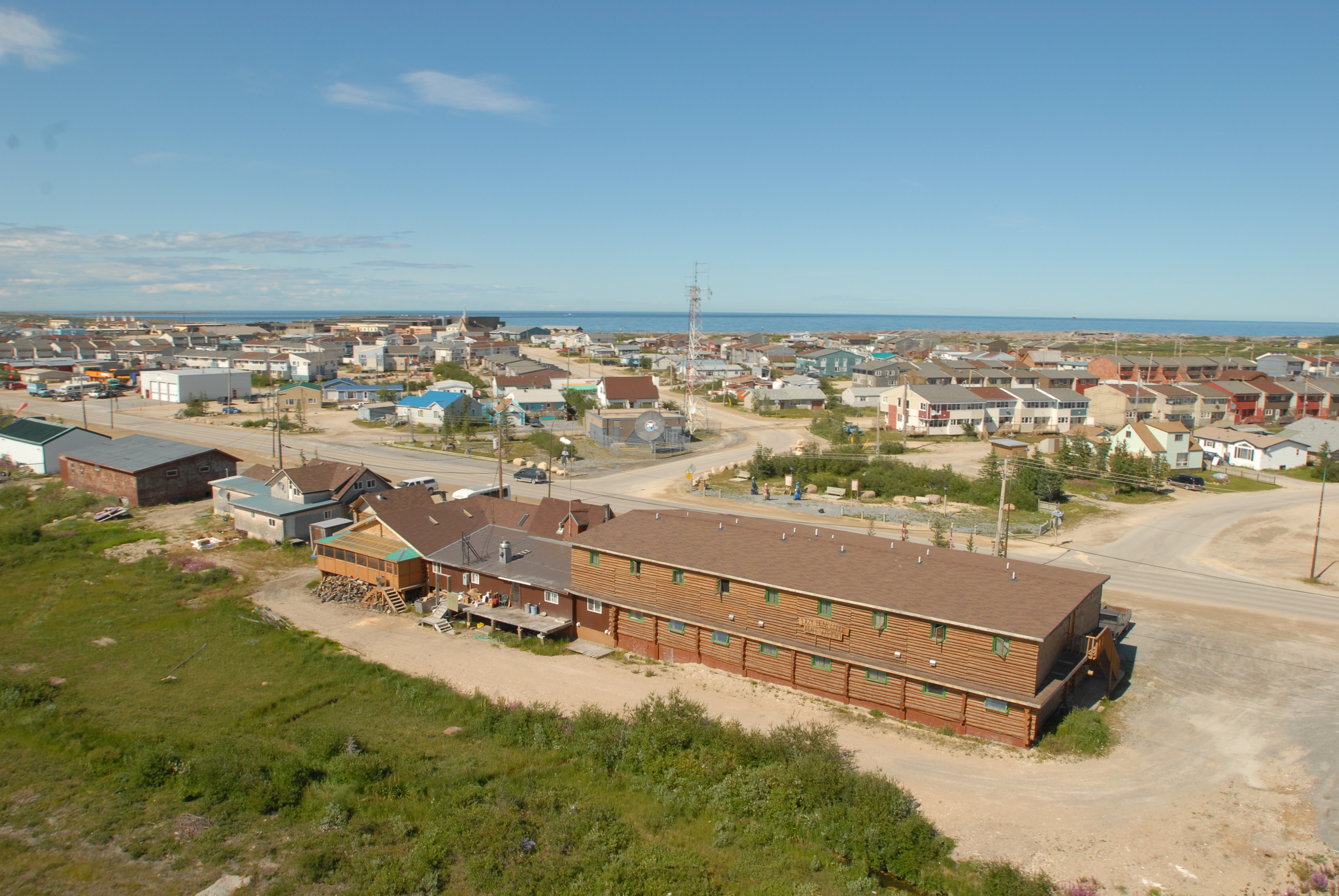
Churchill, Manitoba, Canada

Now reduced to four teams, the race continued from Banff to Churchill on Hudson Bay in the far north; an isolated location without any road connections to the rest of Canada. Despite the seven-hour time differential between first and last place, all four teams left within an hour of each other at dawn on Day 23 because of the danger of bears during the hours of darkness. They soon learnt that the only way to reach Churchill was on the twice-weekly Winnipeg–Churchill train traversing the Hudson Bay Railway, with the next departure from Winnipeg in three days' time.

Three teams selected a route along the Trans-Canada Highway via the large cities of Calgary and Edmonton. Tricia and Cathie headed on to Saskatoon to work on a farm, while Monique and Ladi opted to work in a bait shop in Prince Albert National Park with the aim of kayaking later on nearby Waskesiu Lake. In the meantime, Zainib and Mobeen opted for a route across the prairies of Saskatchewan to work at a rodeo ranch near Moose Jaw. They eventually intercepted the train at Canora, where they met two other teams – Claudia and Kevin, having arrived in Canora earlier that day, had spent their down-time gardening to earn money. Further along the route at The Pas, all four teams were reunited when Monique and Ladi board the same train.

As with Leg 1, all teams arrived at the destination at precisely the same time and the leaderboard was determined by a race to the checkpoint.

Order	Teams	Route	Time behind leaders	Money left
1	Claudia & Kevin	Banff → Calgary → Edmonton → Saskatoon → Canora → Churchill	—N/a	29%
2	Zainib & Mobeen	Banff → Medicine Hat → Moose Jaw → (Yorkton) → Canora → Churchill	2 minutes	49%
3	Tricia & Cathie	Banff → Canmore → Calgary → Edmonton → Saskatoon → Melville → Yorkton → Canora → Churchill	6 minutes	40%
4	Monique & Ladi	Banff → Calgary → Edmonton → Prince Albert → The Pas → Churchill	7 minutes	49%

=== Leg 5: Churchill, Manitoba → Manitoulin Island, Ontario ===
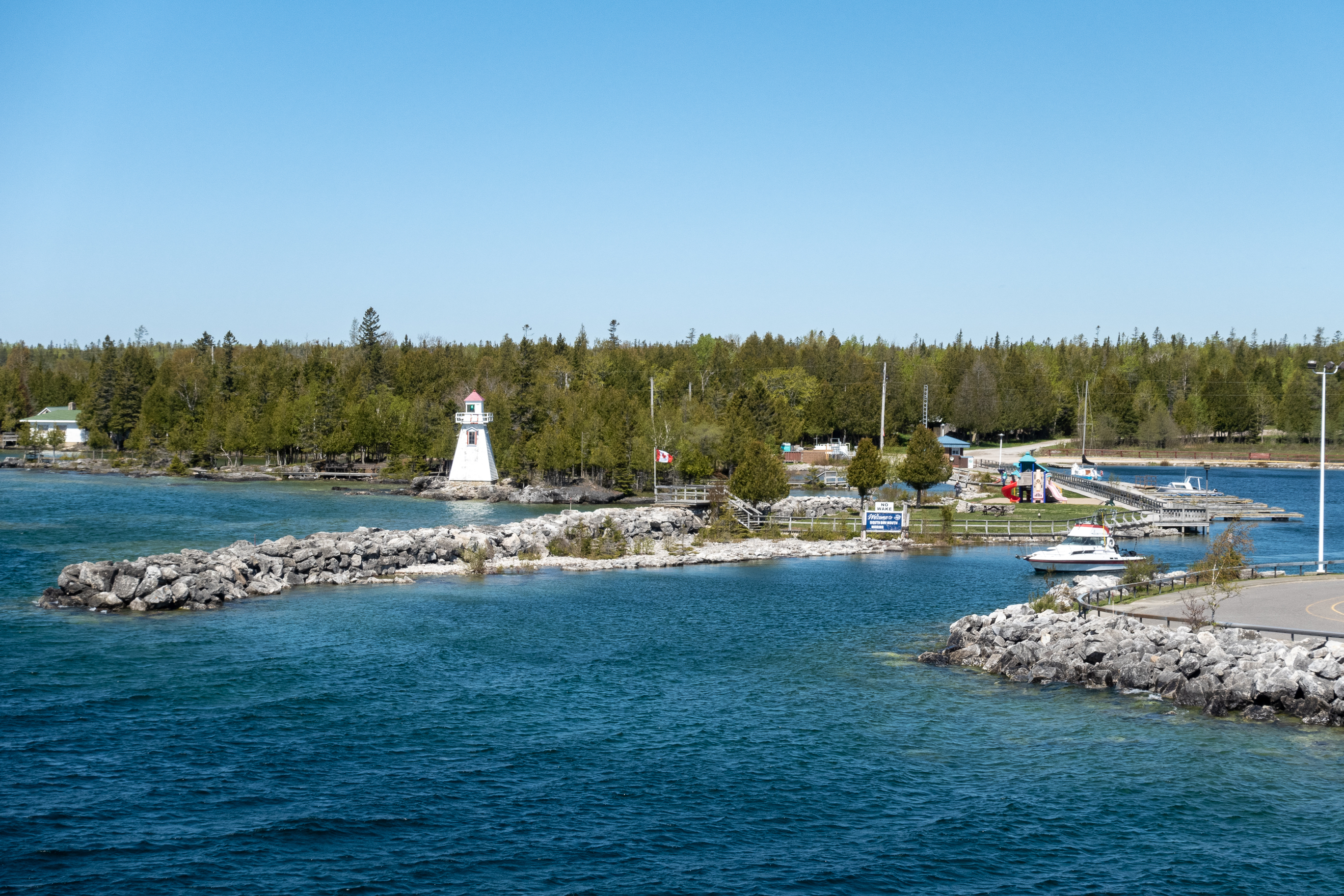
Manitoulin Island, Ontario, Canada

With 9,170 kilometres (5,700 mi) traversed so far, the destination for the fifth leg was Manitoulin island, the largest freshwater Island on Earth. Located approximately 3,000 kilometres (1,900 mi) to the south, this was the longest leg of the race. With the twice-weekly train the only route out of Churchill, the teams retraced their steps along the Hudson Bay Railway on Day 30.

All four teams alighted the train at Thompson, the first stop where the Canadian road network recommences. Claudia and Kevin, and Tricia and Cathie undertook cleaning jobs there before catching an overnight minibus to Winnipeg. The other two teams also took an overnight service to Winnipeg, albeit with a different operator.

Claudia and Kevin chose to press on to Kenora to work renovating a lakeside property in exchange for cash, bed and board whilst the other three teams remained in Winnipeg, with two of the teams finding work as bakers to help replenish their budgets. Zainib and Mobeen, however, spent time with a Cree family in the nearby city of Selkirk to rest and recuperate after two days of difficult travel.

The three teams then caught the bus together the next day out of Winnipeg along the Trans-Canada Highway. Zainib and Mobeen exited the bus at Kenora to earn some money at a working farm just as Claudia and Kevin joined the same bus en route to Thunder Bay. Monique and Ladi, and Tricia and Cathie cleaned boats and an ice hockey arena respectively in Thunder Bay. Claudia and Kevin maintained their lead by continuing further east overnight to Espanola where they hitched a ride to the Little Current Swing Bridge. The remaining three teams caught the Espanola bus a day later, and on arrival they all opted for taxis to Little Current. They were instructed to cross the swing bridge by foot, before learning that the checkpoint was a further 40 kilometres (25 mi) south with no public transport links.

Order	Teams	Route	Hours behind leaders	Money left
1	Claudia & Kevin	Churchill → Thompson → Winnipeg → Kenora → Thunder Bay (Nipigon River Bridge) → Espanola → Little Current → Mindemoya (Manitoulin Island)	—N/a	19%
2	Monique & Ladi	Churchill → Thompson → Winnipeg → Thunder Bay → Espanola → Little Current → Mindemoya (Manitoulin Island)	22.5	34%
3	Tricia & Cathie	Churchill → Thompson → Winnipeg → Thunder Bay → Espanola → Little Current → Mindemoya (Manitoulin Island)	23	26%
4	Zainib & Mobeen	Churchill → Thompson → Winnipeg → Kenora → Thunder Bay → Espanola → Little Current → Mindemoya (Manitoulin Island)	23.5	33%

=== Leg 6: Manitoulin Island, Ontario → Quebec City, Quebec ===
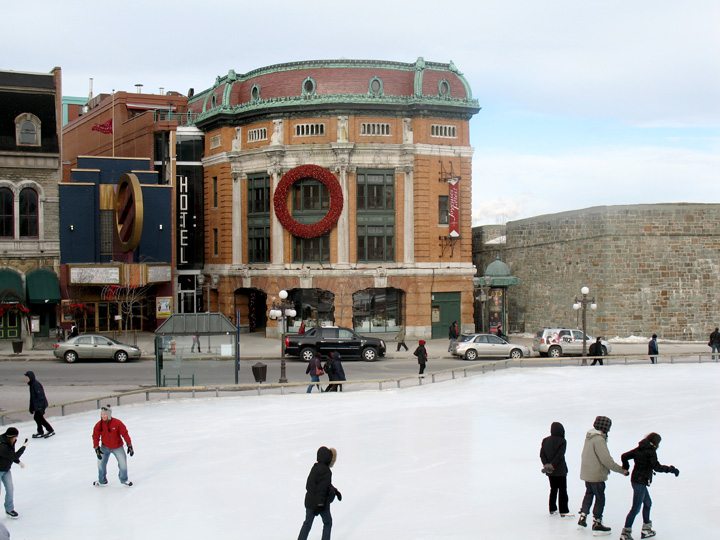
Le Capitole Hôtel, Quebec City, Canada

The race continued from Mindemoya on Manitoulin Island, Ontario to the French speaking province of Quebec and its capital, Quebec City on day 36. In this leg, the teams travelled through the densely populated cities of Toronto, Ottawa and Montreal. Claudia and Kevin and Monique and Ladi took the ferry (MS Chi-Cheemaun) from Manitoulin Island and headed towards Toronto whilst Cathie and Tricia and Zainib and Mobeen backtracked to Espanola to take a more direct route to Ottawa with the latter team stopping in Sudbury to work in a cheese factory for bed and board and an unexpected free onward bus ticket to Ottawa.

In Toronto, Claudia and Kevin chose to take a sightseeing trip to Niagara Falls as Monique and Ladi fell behind due to missing the ferry off Manitoulin Island. Cathie and Tricia stopped in Ottawa to work handing out flyers for the Ottawa Fringe Festival but were forced to reschedule their shift in order to catch the evening bus to Montreal. As they and Claudia and Kevin reached Montreal, both teams discovered the 2022 Canadian Grand Prix was in town and were forced to a pay a premium for accommodation.

With race budgets dwindling rapidly in the cities, three teams were forced to work to earn back cash to make it to Quebec City; Kevin and Claudia worked as delivery couriers, Cathie and Tricia worked in a poutinerie in Montreal, and Monique and Ladi worked in a hairdresser's salon in Toronto. With a healthier budget and a direct train to Quebec City from Ottawa, Zainib and Mobeen overtook the other teams to secure first place. The remaining teams eventually caught the same bus from Montreal to Quebec City, culminating in a footrace through the city streets to the checkpoint.

Order	Teams	Route	Hours behind leaders	Money left
1	Zainib & Mobeen	Mindemoya (Manitoulin Island) → Espanola → Sudbury → Ottawa → Quebec City	—N/a	25%
2	Claudia & Kevin	Mindemoya (Manitoulin Island) → South Baymouth → Tobermory → Guelph → Toronto → (Niagara Falls) → Montreal → Quebec City	11.5	7%
3	Monique & Ladi	Mindemoya (Manitoulin Island) → South Baymouth → Tobermory → Toronto → Montreal → Quebec City	11.5	24%
4	Tricia & Cathie	Mindemoya (Manitoulin Island) → Espanola → Ottawa → Montreal → Quebec City	12	16%

=== Leg 7: Quebec City, Quebec → Liverpool, Nova Scotia ===
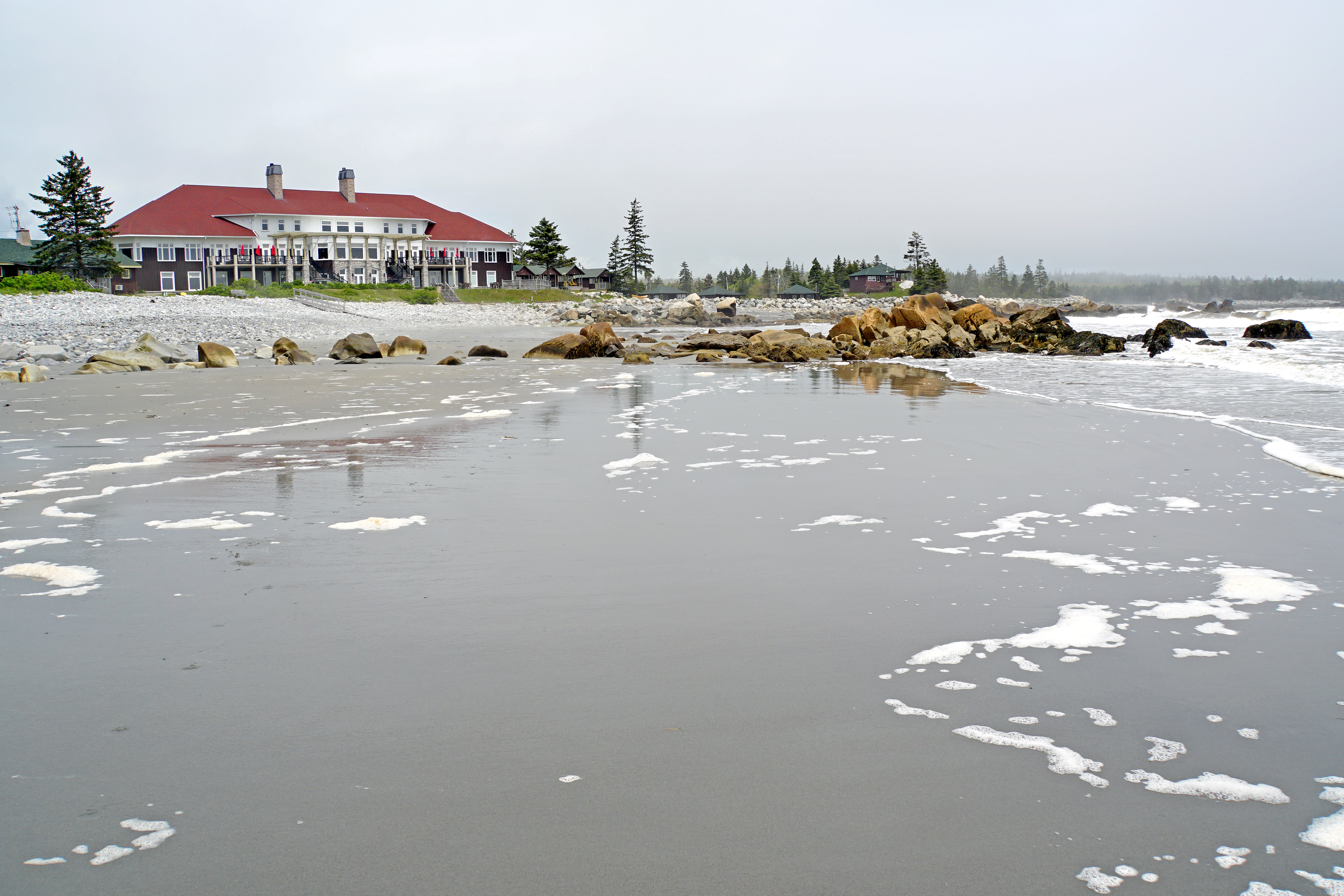
White Point Beach Lodge, Liverpool, Nova Scotia, Canada

The penultimate leg saw the teams journey from French-speaking Quebec City through the Maritimes provinces of New Brunswick and Nova Scotia to the Atlantic coast and the town of Liverpool on Nova Scotia's South Shore approximately 1,100 kilometres (680 mi) away.

On day 43, Zainib and Mobeen took the first bus of the day out of Quebec City to Rimouski aiming to continue onward to New Brunswick. The other teams attempted to take a later bus to Rimouski; however, Tricia and Cathie bought the last two tickets which left Monique and Ladi and Claudia and Kevin stranded in Quebec City. With few transport options out of Quebec City for the rest of the day, Monique and Ladi decided to take a taxi to Rivière-du-Loup and seek a ride from there into New Brunswick.

Down to their last couple of hundred dollars and determined to reach the Atlantic Coast, Claudia and Kevin were greeted by a cannabis shop owner in Edmunston who provided them with breakfast, drove them down to Fredericton and paid for their hotel stay for the night. All four teams worked in New Brunswick to top up their budgets in preparation for the final leg. In Miramichi, Zainib and Mobeen worked in a motel and secured a lift for the following day so that they could raft on the Bay of Fundy tidal bore. Tricia and Cathie built a teepee in Miramichi and worked in a lobster restaurant in Shediac, whilst Monique and Ladi worked in a pizza restaurant in Saint John.

As three teams made it to Liverpool, Claudia and Kevin (who had increased their budget by working at a local brewery) attempted to hitchhike to Prince Edward Island to find more work. After failing to secure a ride and having spent over six hours in pouring rain, they decided to abandon the race.

Order	Teams	Route	Hours behind leaders	Money left
1	Zainib & Mobeen	Quebec City → Rimouski → Campbellton → Miramichi → Sackville → Truro → Halifax → Liverpool	—N/a	12%
2	Tricia & Cathie	Quebec City → Rimouski → Miramichi (Metepenagiag) → Shediac → Truro → Liverpool	14	13%
3	Monique & Ladi	Quebec City → Rivière-du-Loup → Fredericton → Saint John → Digby → Liverpool	18.5	15%
4	Claudia & Kevin	Quebec City → (Lévis) → Rivière-du-Loup → Edmunston → Fredericton		

=== Leg 8: Liverpool, Nova Scotia → St. John's, Newfoundland and Labrador ===
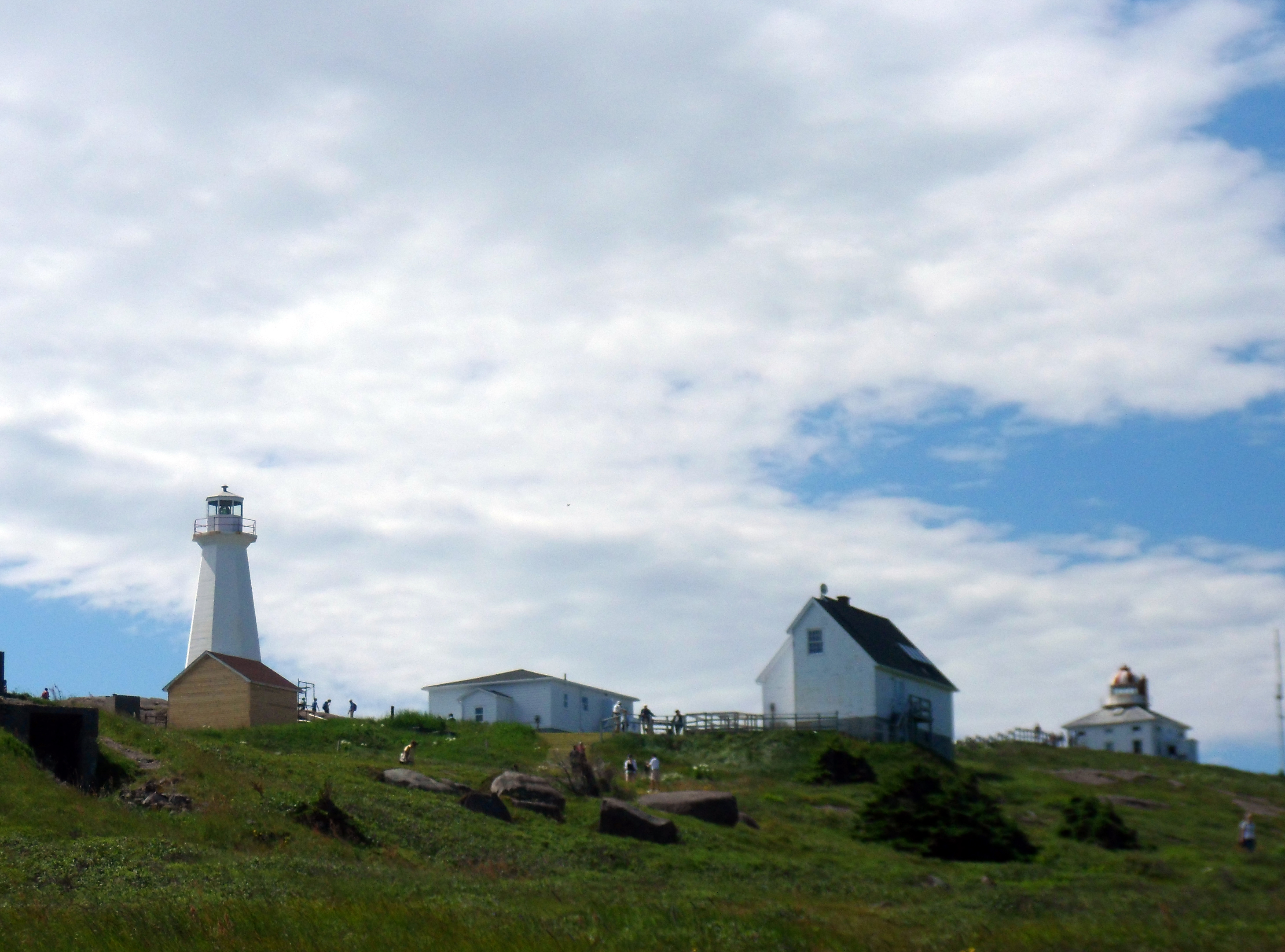
Cape Spear, Newfoundland, Canada

The competition's final leg began on day 47 with a 1,500-kilometre (930 mi) race from Liverpool to the last checkpoint near St. John's on the eastern tip of Newfoundland's Avalon Peninsula.

Zainib and Mobeen forfeited their lead with a decision to work in Lunenburg at a seafood restaurant whilst Tricia and Cathie and Monique and Ladi raced ahead to Halifax by taxi; the latter two teams found themselves potentially stranded for a day due to lack of onward buses. Monique and Ladi decided to stay overnight in a hostel where Zainib and Mobeen were also trying to get a room, but the hostel was fully booked. Monique and Ladi were offered their first free homestay of the race, but Zainib and Mobeen had to find a hotel. Tricia and Cathie decided not to wait and travelled to Truro in a taxi with the goal of reaching Antigonish to work in a gin distillery. Also with dwindling funds, Zainib and Mobeen decided to work in Port Hawkesbury at an off-road tours company for free bed and board, before heading on to North Sydney. Meanwhile, Monique and Ladi found time to visit the site of Africville whilst en route to Baddeck.

All three teams were ultimately faced with the same dilemma: whether to take the costlier ferry to Argentia or the shorter, cheaper one across the Cabot Strait to the more remote town of Port aux Basques. Tricia and Cathie, who arrived at the port on the evening of Day 49 opted for the night ferry to Port aux Basques, as it offered free overnight shelter and kept them moving ever closer towards the finish. Monique and Ladi who arrived the next morning, declined the morning Port aux Basques ferry and chose to wait for the afternoon Argentia ferry to minimise the onward journey to St. Johns; meanwhile Zainib and Mobeen also arrived at the port in time for the same Argentia ferry.

In St. John's, the teams received instruction that the final checkpoint was at Cape Spear, the most easterly point of the North American continent, a further 16 kilometres (9.9 mi) away. Tricia and Cathie arrived first, on day 51 with a lead of two hours.

Order	Teams	Route	Hours behind leaders	Money left
1	Tricia & Cathie	Liverpool → Halifax → Truro → Antigonish → Port Hawkesbury → North Sydney → Port Aux Basques → Bishop's Falls → Norris Arm North → St. John's → Cape Spear	—N/a	
2	Zainib & Mobeen	Liverpool → Lunenburg → Halifax → Port Hawkesbury → North Sydney → Argentia → St. John's → Cape Spear	2	
3	Monique & Ladi	Liverpool → Halifax → (Africville) → Baddeck → North Sydney → Argentia → St. John's → Cape Spear	2.5	

== Critical reception ==
Opinions on the third series were favourable overall, with Jack Seale of The Guardian awarding it the maximum of 5 stars. Lauding the choice of contestants, he stated, "The secrets and tensions within relationships, magnified and then inevitably resolved on the journey – a process these people have chosen to undergo in a foreign country, on national television – are what make Race Across the World a top-tier reality show, and this year's cast could be the best ever."

Emily Baker of the i newspaper awarded the opening episode 4 stars out of 5, initially sceptical surrounding the choice of a largely English speaking country as the setting for the entire series, she went on to admit that the lack of a language barrier in no way made the race less challenging, judging it to be "Painstakingly slow, fiendishly strategic and with real dangers along the way (bears, mostly), this is Race Across the World in a way we've never seen it before."

Anita Singh of The Telegraph also gave the show 4 stars out of 5, commenting: "TV executives always want programmes to be about 'the journey' but in this show, the actual journey provides the real fun." Carol Midgley, writing in The Times, gave the lowest score of any reviewer, awarding the opening episode 3 stars out of 5.

The Telegraph again awarded the series finale 4 stars out of 5, commenting that although the series was far from perfect, "This BBC adventure series is still the most wholesome thing on TV." and commending the hospitality of Canadians. Emily Baker of the i awarded the series finale 5 stars out of 5. In a separate column she bemoaned the fact that the series was "almost ruined" by the use of taxis, but stated it would be a mistake to ban them from the competition.

== Ratings ==
Episode no.	Airdate	Total viewers (millions)	Weekly ranking all channels
1	22 March 2023	4.73	11
2	29 March 2023	4.75	10
3	5 April 2023	4.54	8
4	12 April 2023	4.69	7
5	19 April 2023	4.54	9
6	26 April 2023	4.12	13
7	3 May 2023	4.40	17
8	10 May 2023	4.93	5
9	10 May 2023	—N/a	—N/a
