= Thomas Purfoot =

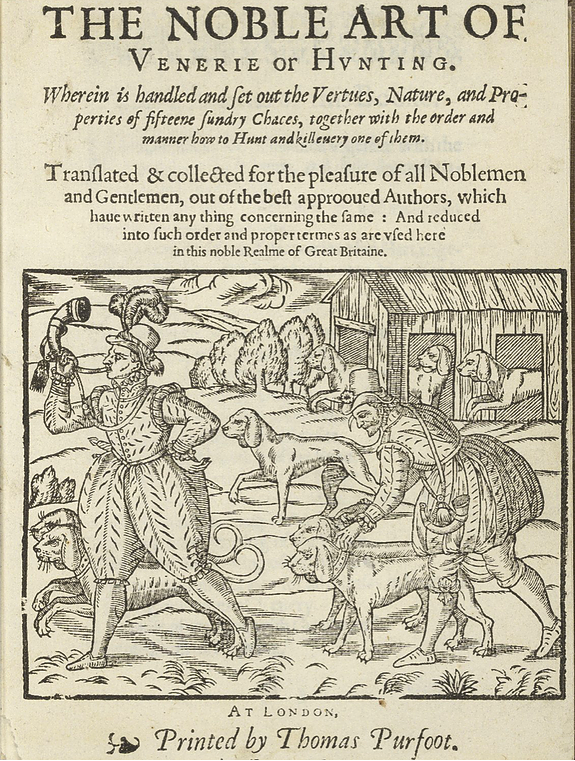
Title page of The Noble Art of Venerie or Hunting by George Gascoigne (1611 edition)

Thomas Purfoot (1546 - 1615) is the imprint of an English bookselling and printing business based in London. The business was successively owned by Thomas Purfoot Senior and Thomas Purfoot Junior.

Purfoot's printshop was located in St Nicholas Shambles. He largely printed translations of foreign works and medical and scientific texts. Thomas Orwin served as his apprentice. However, Orwin went on to work for the printer George Robinson.

== Books printed ==
- 1566 David Lyndsay The Monarchie Ane Dialog betwixt Experience and ane Courteor
- 1567 (unknown author) Trial of Treasure
- 1571? Thomas Purfoote A coppie of the letter sent from Ferrara the xxii. of Nouember. 1570
- 1575 George Gascoigne, The Noble Art of Venerie or Hunting
- 1581 Robert FletcherAn Introduction to the Looue of God. Accoumpted among the workes of St. Augustine, and translated into English by Edmund [Freake], bishop of Norwich that nowe is … and newlie turned into Englishe Meter by Rob. Fletcher
- 1597 Peter Lowe The whole course of chirurgerie ... Compiled by Peter Lowe Scotchman, Arellian, Doctor in the Facultie of Chirurgerie in Paris, and chirurgian ordinarie to the most victorious and christian King of Fraunce and Nauarre.
- 1605 John Marston, The Dutch Courtesan
- 1606 Samuel Gardiner, A Booke of Angling or Fishing. Wherein is shewed by conference with Scriptures the agreement betweene the Fishermen, Fishes, Fishing, of both natures, Temporall and Spirituall, Math. iv. 19.
- 1610 Andrea Ghisi, Wits Laberynth
