= Samuel Gardner (disambiguation) =

Samuel Gardner (1891–1984) was an American composer.

Samuel Gardner may also refer to:

- Samuel H. Gardner (1876–1942), Allegheny County District Attorney for Pittsburgh
- Samuel Gardner (English politician) (fl. 1625–1674)
- Samuel Gardner (Georgia politician) (fl. 1868), representative elected to the Georgia Assembly during the Reconstruction era

== See also ==
- Sam Gardner (disambiguation)
- Samuel Gardiner (disambiguation)
- Samuel Paul Garner (1910–1996), American accounting scholar
- Samuel Gardner House, a historic house in Swansea, Massachusetts
