= Race Across the World =

British television series

- Genre: Reality competition Travel
- Directed by: Rob Fisher
- Narrated by: John Hannah
- Theme music composer: Michael Burns
- Country of origin: United Kingdom
- Original language: English
- No. of series: 6
- No. of episodes: 51

Production
- Executive producers: Mark Saben; Tim Harcourt; Stephen Lambert
- Producers: Brent Gundesen; Zoe Hines; Georgina Kiedrowski; Eddie Lewis; Alex Reynolds
- Editor: Stephen Day
- Running time: 60 minutes
- Production company: Studio Lambert

Original release
- Network: BBC Two
- Release: 3 March 2019 – 26 April 2020
- Network: BBC One
- Release: 8 March 2023 – present

Related
- Celebrity Race Across the World

Race Across the World is a British television competition programme, in which teams of two race across an area of the world to become the fastest to reach a destination using any means of transportation other than air travel. For the journey, each team are given an amount of money equivalent to a one-way plane ticket to the final destination. The programme was broadcast on BBC Two for the first two series, but moved to BBC One for the third series. It has been narrated by John Hannah since first airing in 2019.

The first series, consisting of six episodes, aired from 3 March to 7 April 2019. The series proved successful, and on 9 July 2019, the BBC confirmed that a second and third series had been commissioned. The second series consisted of nine episodes, with the opening episode broadcast on 8 March 2020. Due to the success of the airings on BBC Two, the BBC announced moving the third series to BBC One. Further series have been commissioned.

A spin-off series, Celebrity Race Across the World, started airing in 2023.

== Format ==
The programme follows pairs of competitors racing around the world to be the first to reach the final destination. The route to the final destination is divided by a series of checkpoints, and the competitors travel from checkpoint to checkpoint until they reach their final destination. Each episode focuses on the race to one checkpoint, and at each checkpoint, the racers are given a break of between 36 and 72 hours. One team may be eliminated if they come last at the pre-determined checkpoint. The competitors are not permitted to fly (although flights may be organised under certain circumstances), and they are each given an amount of money equivalent to the price of a one-way plane ticket to the final destination, which they can use to travel by land or by sea. The money can be used to pay for the cost of any travel including food and accommodation, but teams may also work to earn more money along the way. The teams cannot choose the same job and the first team to leave the hotel have the first choice.

The competitors are not allowed any mobile electronic devices or credit cards at the start of the race, but are given a world map, a GPS device to track their progress and for safety as well as finding the checkpoints, and a travel guide with local job adverts, in addition to their travel money in cash. A director and a producer/camera operator accompany each pair of racers, as well as a local fixer and medical support that follow them an hour behind. In every episode, the teams are given a checkpoint they have to reach. The first team to reach the final destination is awarded the cash prize of £20,000.

== Production ==
Before the race, the producers made a decision on the start and end points of the race. Two assistant producers were then sent to conduct a recce research trip to assess the feasibility of such a journey within the budget constraints. One of them assessed sights and activities that could work well on the show, while the other focused on the logistics. All likely bus and train journeys were assessed beforehand. Visas were sought for the countries along all possible routes before the race as well as any necessary vaccinations required for entry to these countries.

During the race, each team were accompanied by two film crew members. All decisions, however, were made by the racers and the crew could not interfere with their choices. A director of photography travelled behind the teams for additional location filming. To ensure the safety of the racers, there may be local fixers and security advisers who observed the racers from a distance, and a medical support vehicle also travelled an hour behind the teams in some countries.

The programme was commissioned by David Brindley and Michael Jochnowitz for BBC Two.

== Series overview ==
Series	Episodes	Originally released			Start	End	Winners
Series	Episodes	First released	Last released	Network	Start	End	Winners
1	6	3 March 2019	7 April 2019	BBC Two	London, United Kingdom	Marina Bay, Singapore	Elaine Teasdale & Tony Teasdale
2	9	8 March 2020	26 April 2020	BBC Two	Mexico City, Mexico	Ushuaia, Argentina	Emon Choudhury & Jamiul Choudhury
3	9	8 March 2023	26 April 2023	BBC One	Vancouver, British Columbia	St. John's, Newfoundland and Labrador	Tricia Sail & Cathie Rowe
4	9	10 April 2024	29 May 2024	BBC One	Sapporo, Japan	Gili Meno, Lombok, Indonesia	Alfie Watts & Owen Wood
5	9	23 April 2025	18 June 2025	BBC One	Huanghuacheng, China	Kanyakumari, India	Caroline Bridge & Tom Bridge
6	9	2 April 2026	21 May 2026	BBC One	Palermo, Sicily, Italy	Hatgal, Mongolia	Jo Diop & Kush Burman

=== Series 1 (2019) ===
Series 1 start and end points

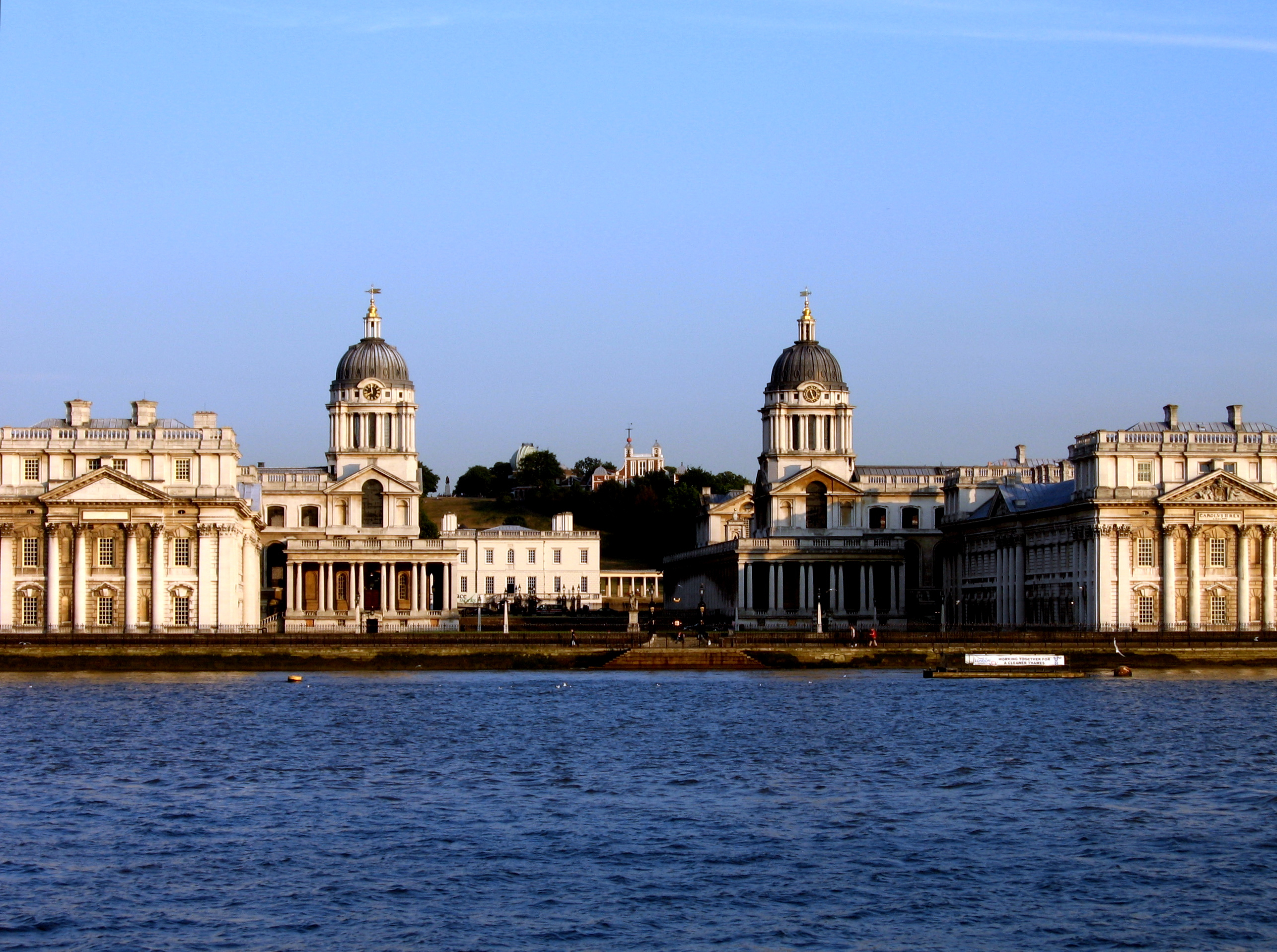
Old Royal Naval College (London)

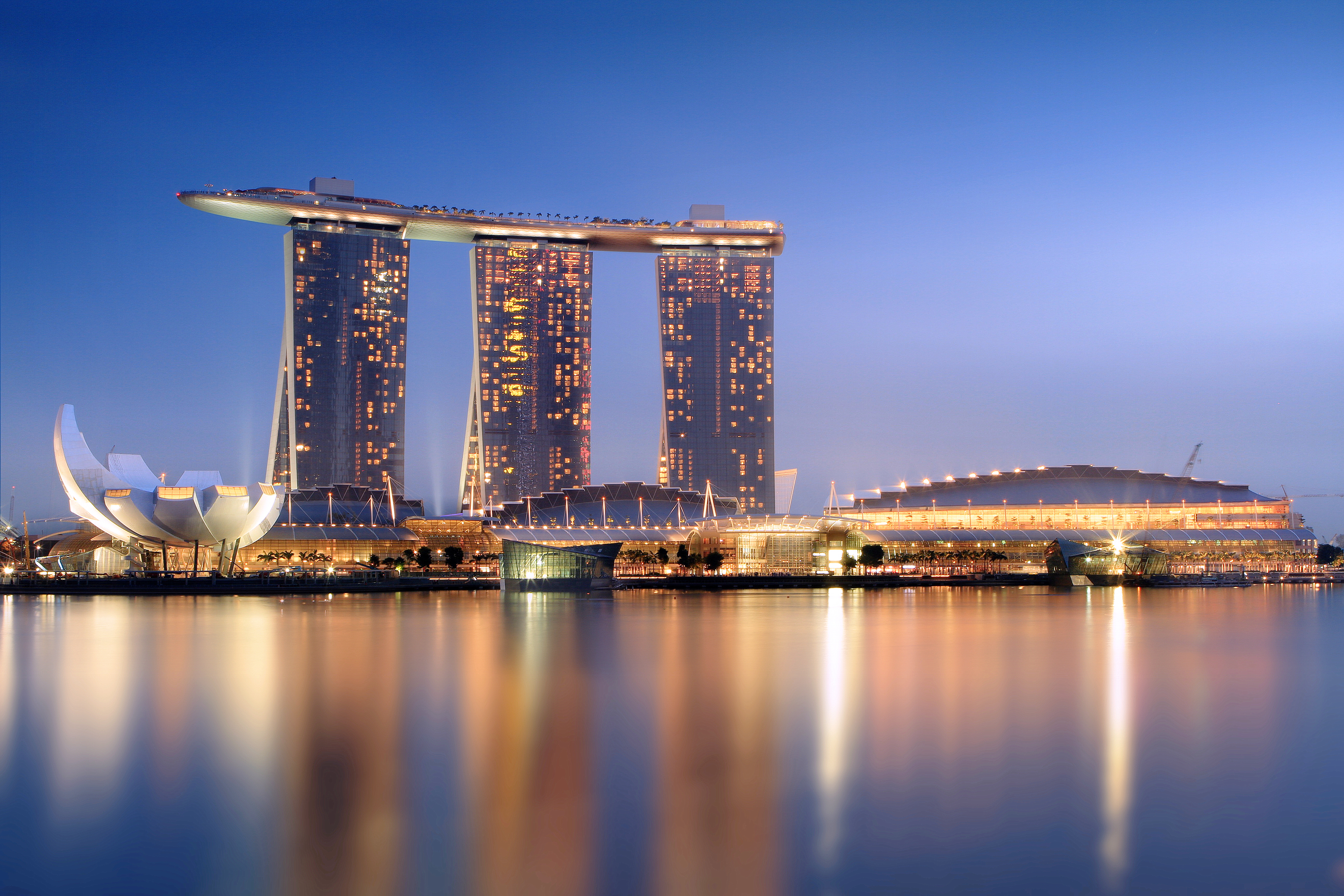
Marina Bay Sands (Singapore)

The first series of Race Across the World consisting of six episodes first aired on BBC Two from 3 March to 7 April 2019. Five pairs of racers travelled from the Old Royal Naval College in Greenwich, London and finished at the Marina Bay Sands hotel in Singapore. The itinerary of the race covered countries in Europe and Asia with checkpoints in Greece, Azerbaijan, Uzbekistan, China and Cambodia. In the first series, the contestants were each given £1,329 for the whole race, a journey of 12,000 miles which was completed in 50 days.

The first series featured five pairs of competitors at the start of the race: Natalie and Shameema, Jinda and Bindu, Darron and Alex, Josh and Felix, and Sue and Clare. Jinda and Bindu withdrew due to family illness in the first episode, and were replaced by Tony and Elaine, while Sue and Clare were eliminated in the second episode. The winners were Tony and Elaine.

The series was the most successful debut for a factual entertainment show on BBC Two in over three years, and one of the most-watched shows of the year for the channel.

=== Series 2 (2020) ===
Series 2 start and end points

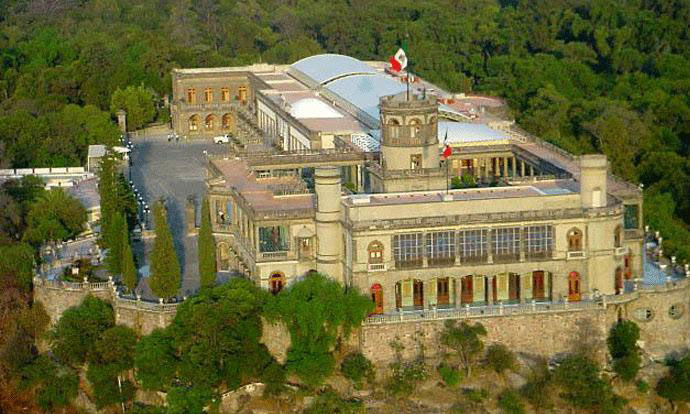
Chapultepec Castle (Mexico City)

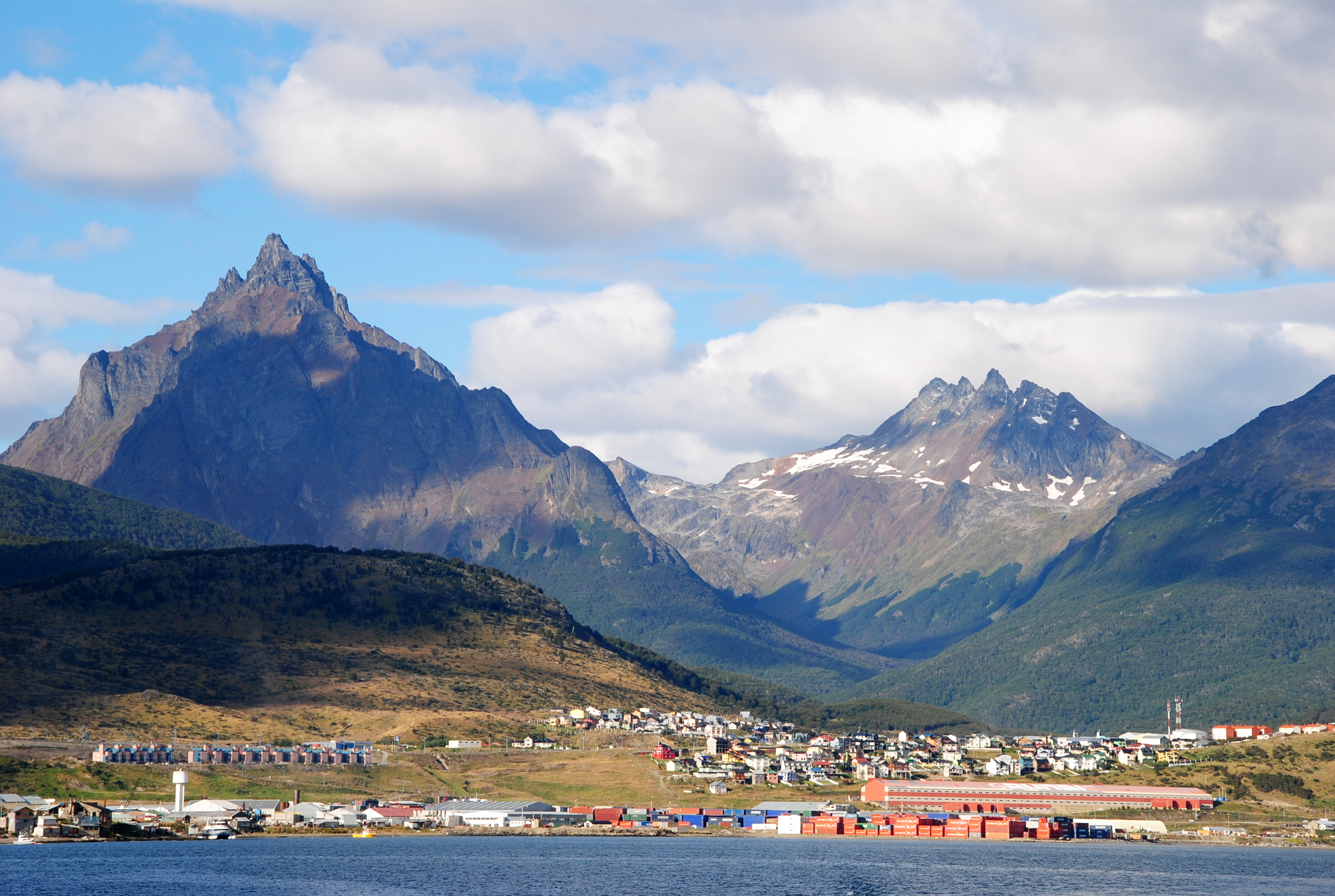
Ushuaia (Argentina)

A second series began airing on 8 March 2020 with five teams setting off from Chapultepec Castle in Mexico City in a race to the most southerly city in the world, Ushuaia in Argentina, covering a distance of 25,000 km in 2 months, passing through 7 checkpoints in Honduras, Panama, Colombia, Peru, Brazil, and Argentina. Each team was given £1,453 for the entire trip, equating to roughly £26 per day. Filming started in September 2019.

In this series, the no-fly rule was abandoned due to civil unrest in Ecuador which made land travel through the country unsafe - all the teams were flown from Colombia to Peru to continue the race. The 5 teams of racers were Dom & Lizzie, Jo & Sam, Jen & Rob, Shuntelle & Michael, and Emon and Jamiul. No one was eliminated in this series but two teams decided to quit; Shuntelle & Michael left after losing half of their money in leg 2 of the race, while Jo & Sam withdrew after they had run out of money in leg 7. The winners were Emon and Jamiul who beat Jen & Rob to the final checkpoint by seconds.

The number of episodes increased from six to nine this series; eight episodes on the race followed by a reunion special.

=== Series 3 (2023) ===
Series 3 start and end points

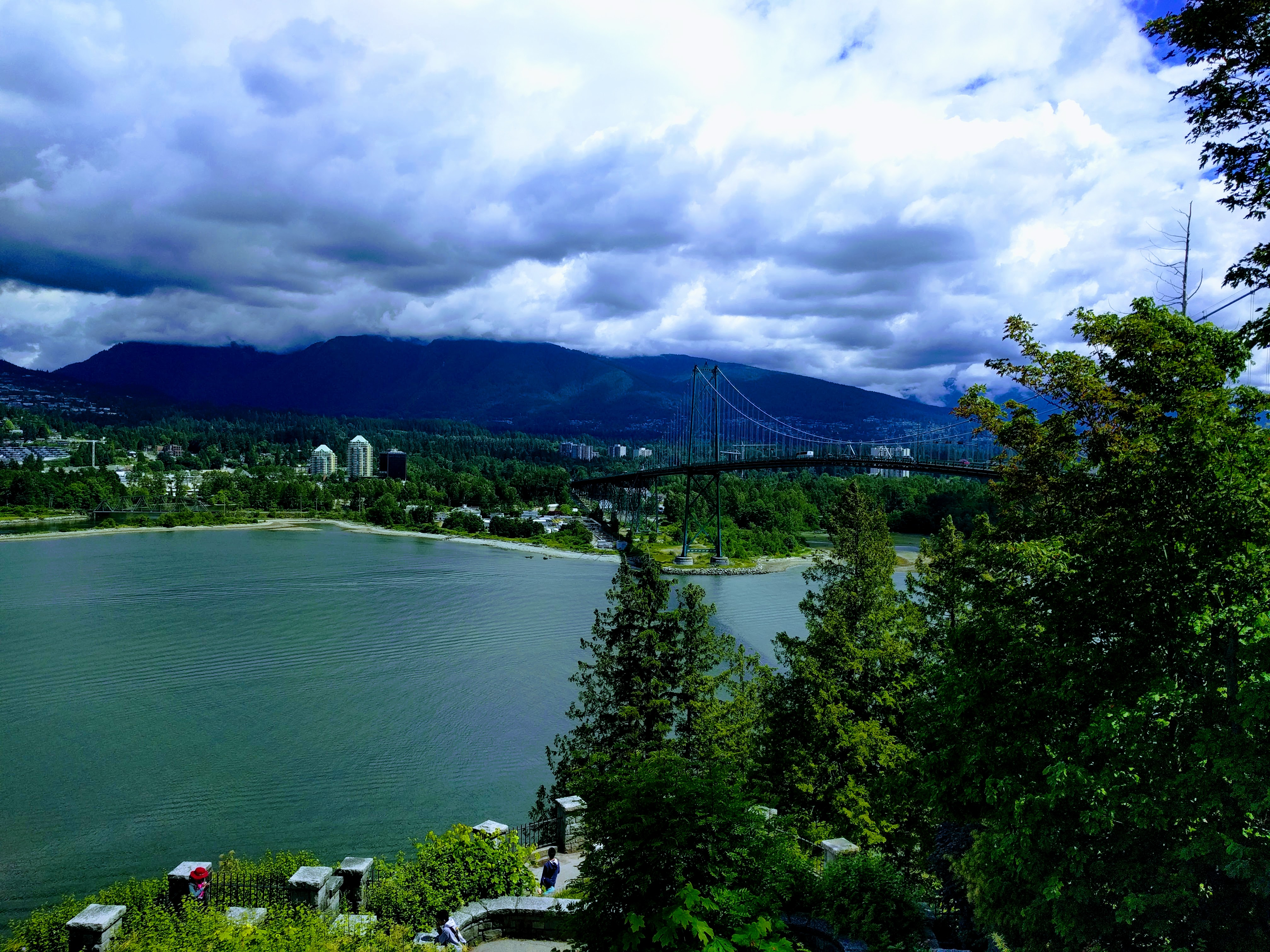
Stanley Park (Vancouver)

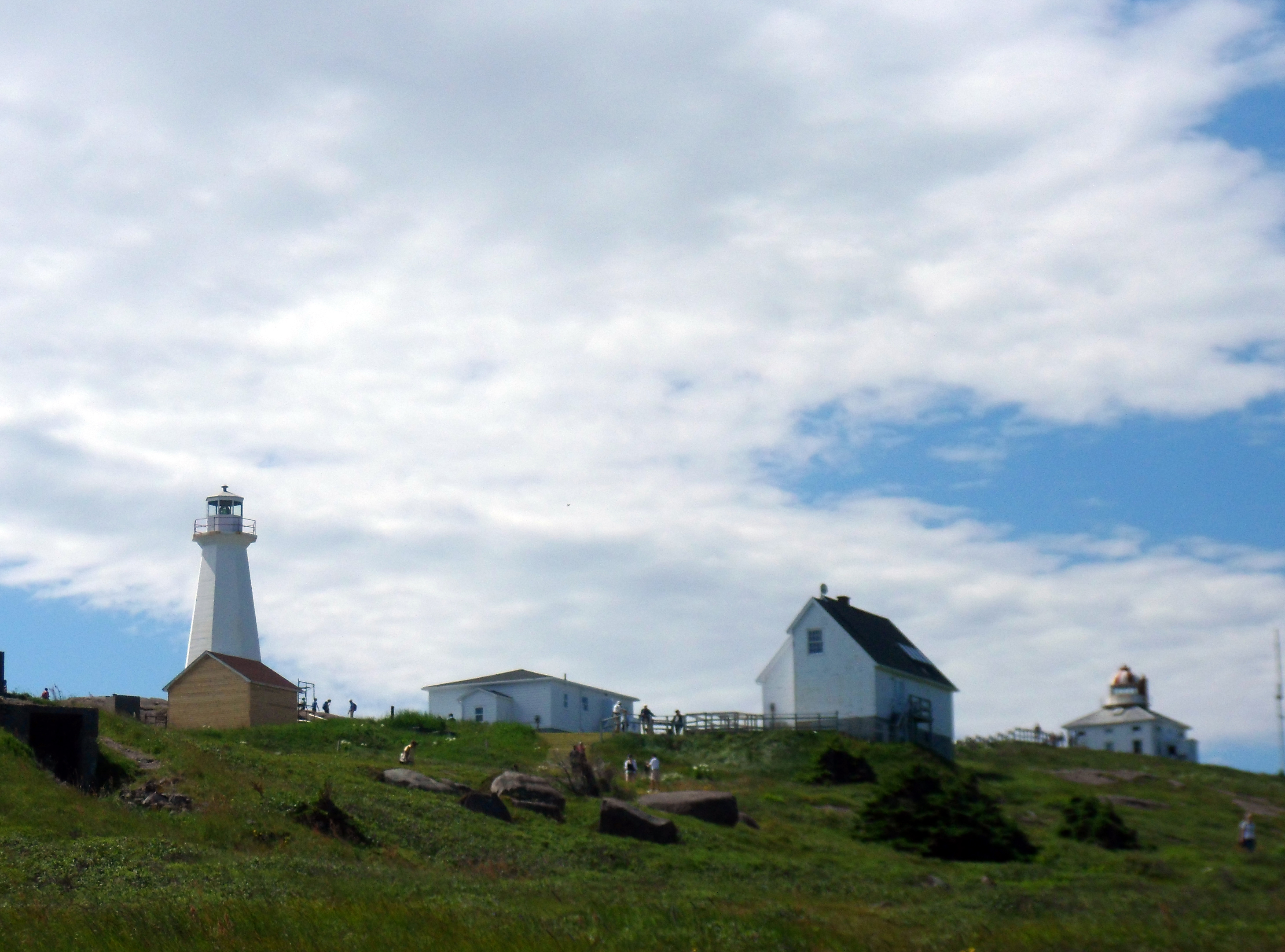
St John's (Newfoundland)

On 28 September 2022, the BBC announced that a third series of Race Across the World would enter production by the end of the year, which will be set wholly within Canada with a route from Vancouver, British Columbia to St. John's, Newfoundland and Labrador. The programme also moved from BBC Two to BBC One.

In a subsequent press release dated 15 March 2023, the BBC revealed the five pairs of competitors as Cathie and Tricia, Claudia and Kevin, Ladi and Monique, Marc and Michael, and Mobeen and Zainib. Claudia and Kevin withdrew after running out of money. In a move from its previous Sunday evening broadcast to a midweek timeslot, the air date for the first episode of the third series was confirmed as 22 March 2023. Once again the series comprises nine episodes: eight episodes on the race followed by a reunion special. The winners were Cathie and Tricia.

=== Series 4 (2024) ===
Series 4 start and end points

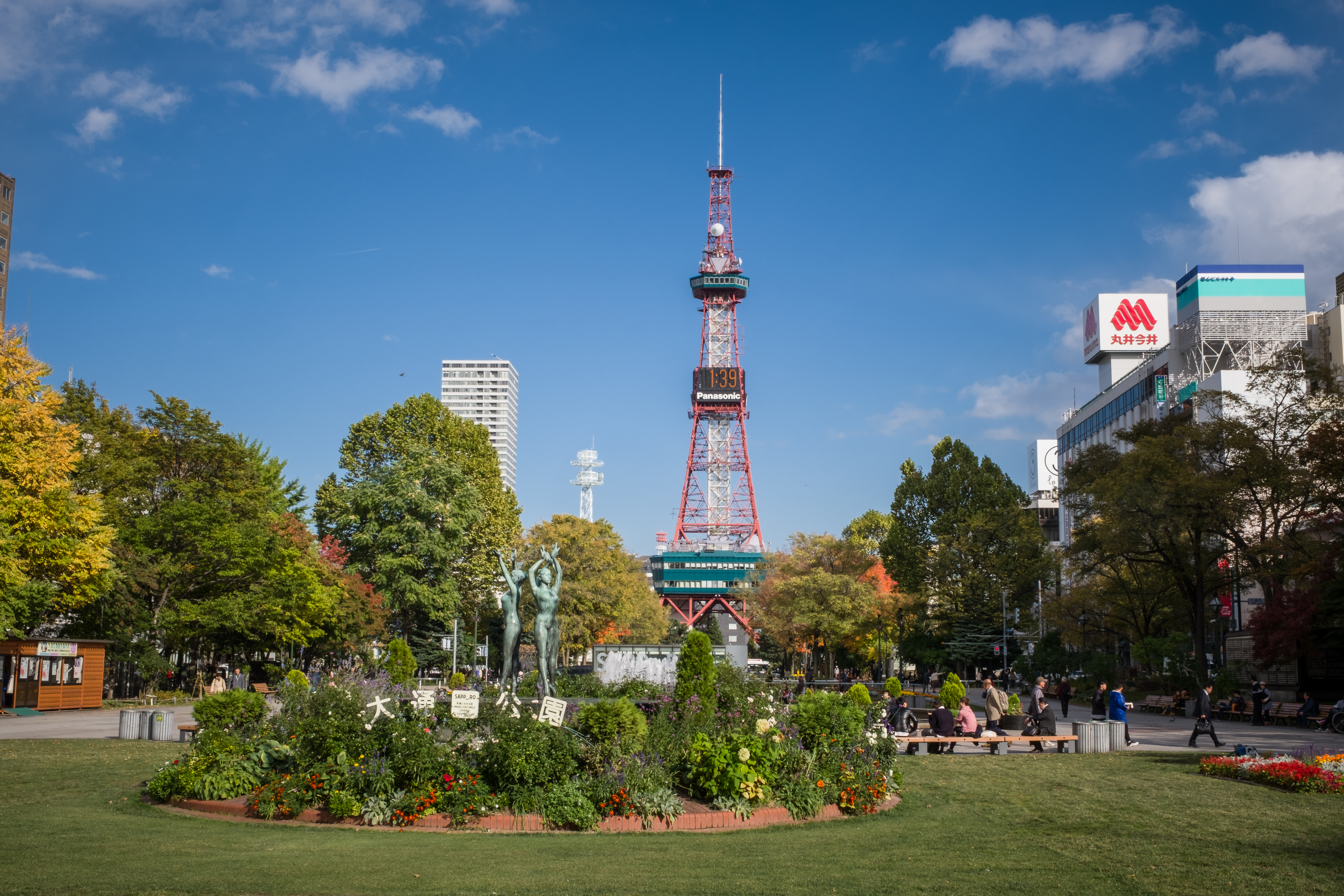
Odori Park (Japan)

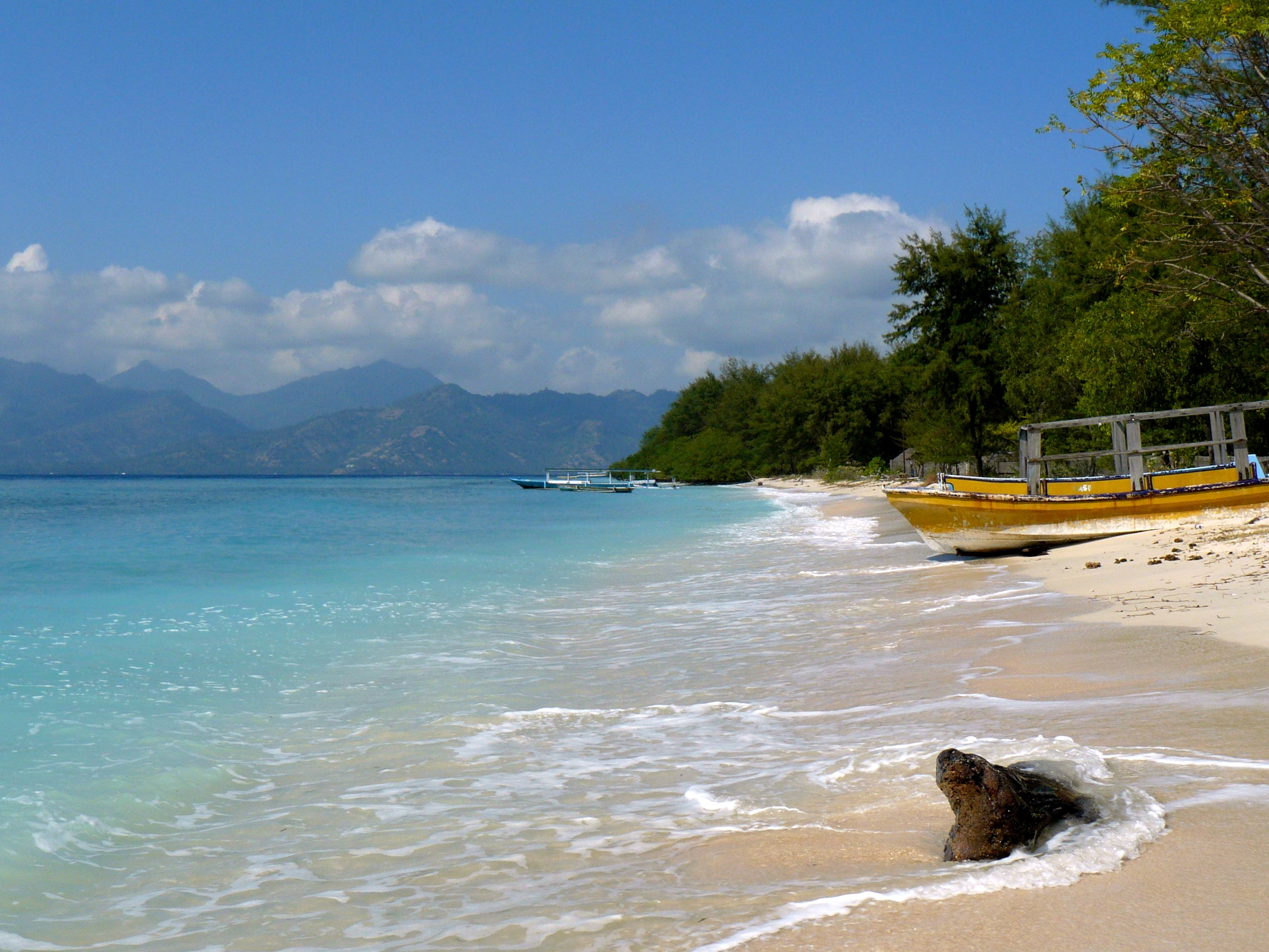
Gili Meno, Lombok (Indonesia)

The fourth series of Race Across the World began airing on 10 April 2024 and featured five teams racing from Japan to Indonesia, but skipping over China. China was omitted during the planning stage due to "time constraints and difficulties in travel in the aftermath of the global pandemic", so a flight was organised to move the contestants from Seoul to Hanoi.

The teams were mother and daughter Brydie and Sharon, as well as Eugenie and Isabel; two friends, Alfie and Owen; husband and wife, Stephen and Viv; and brother and sister, Betty and James. This series was won by Alfie and Owen.

=== Series 5 (2025) ===
Series 5 start and end points

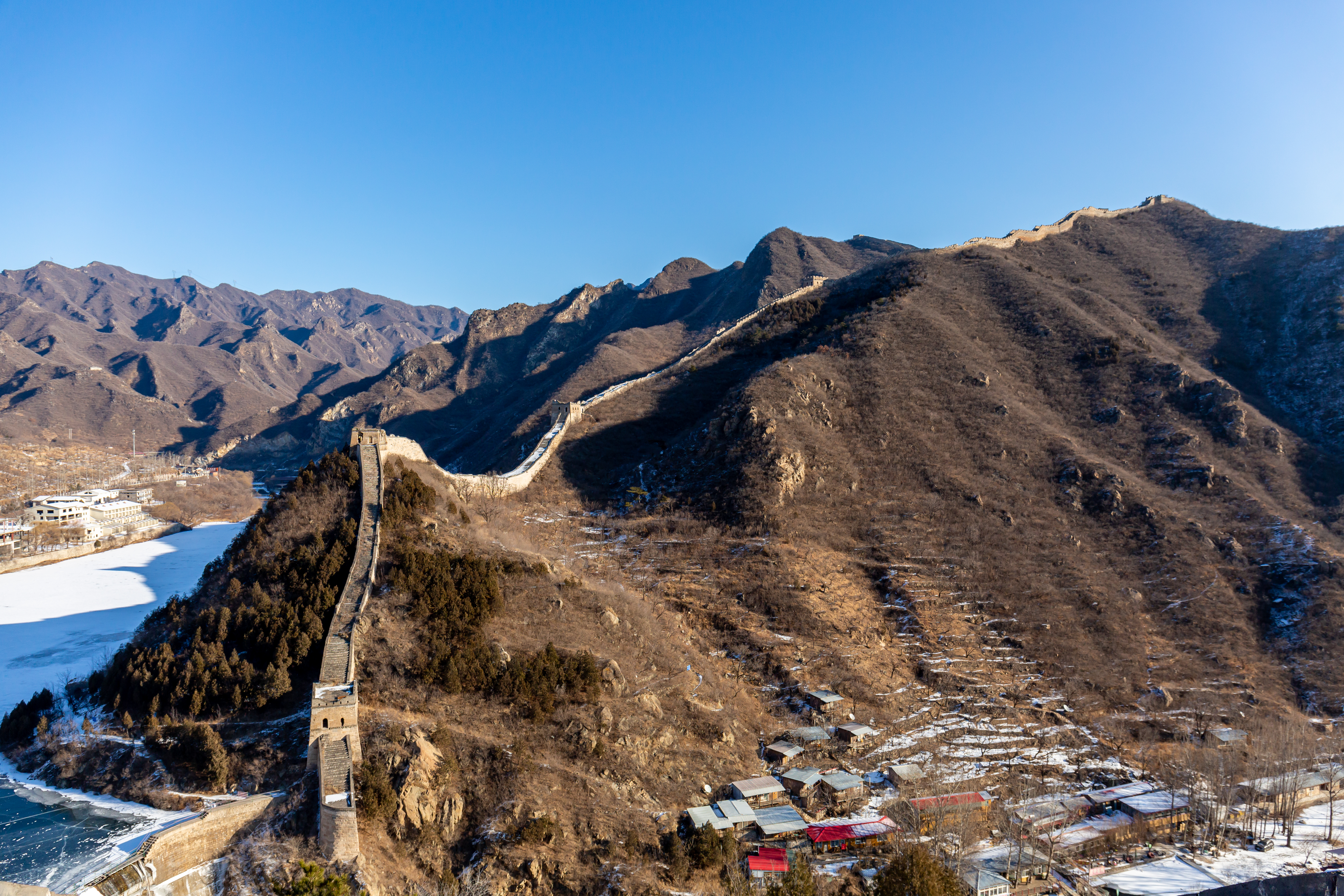
Huanghuacheng (China)

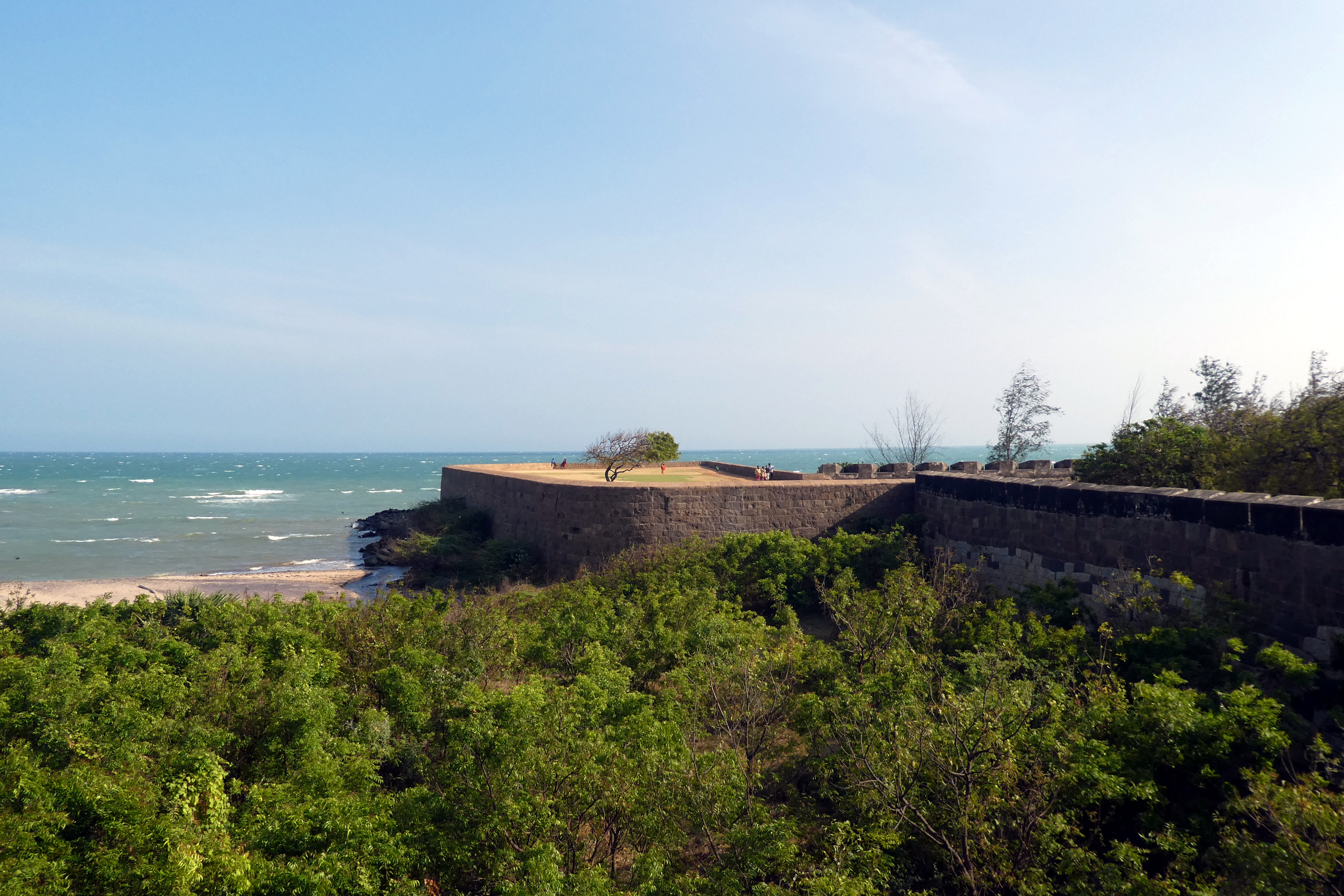
Kanyakumari (India)

The fifth series of Race Across the World began airing on 23 April 2025, where five teams are to race from north eastern China to the southernmost tip of India. The teams start from the Great Wall of China at Huanghuacheng in northeast China and race to Kanyakumari at the southernmost tip of India.

The teams for this series are sisters Elizabeth and Letitia, former married couple Yin and Gaz, brothers Brian and Melvyn, teenage couple Fin and Sioned; and mother and son, Caroline and Tom. Yin and Gaz were eliminated after becoming stuck over 1800 kilometers away from the third checkpoint in the third episode. The winners after 51 days of racing were Caroline and Tom.

=== Series 6 (2026) ===
Series 6 start and end points

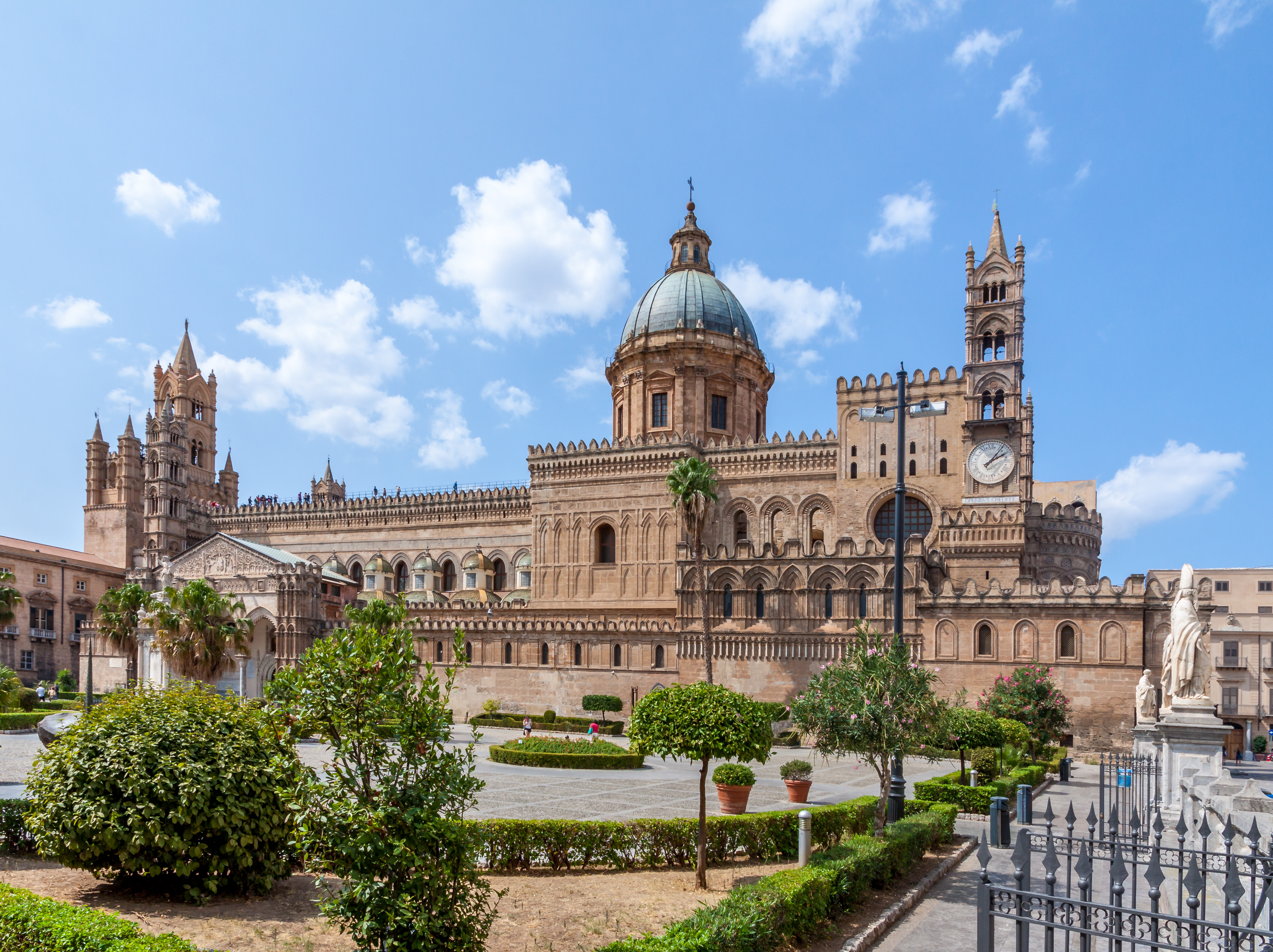
Palermo Cathedral (Italy)

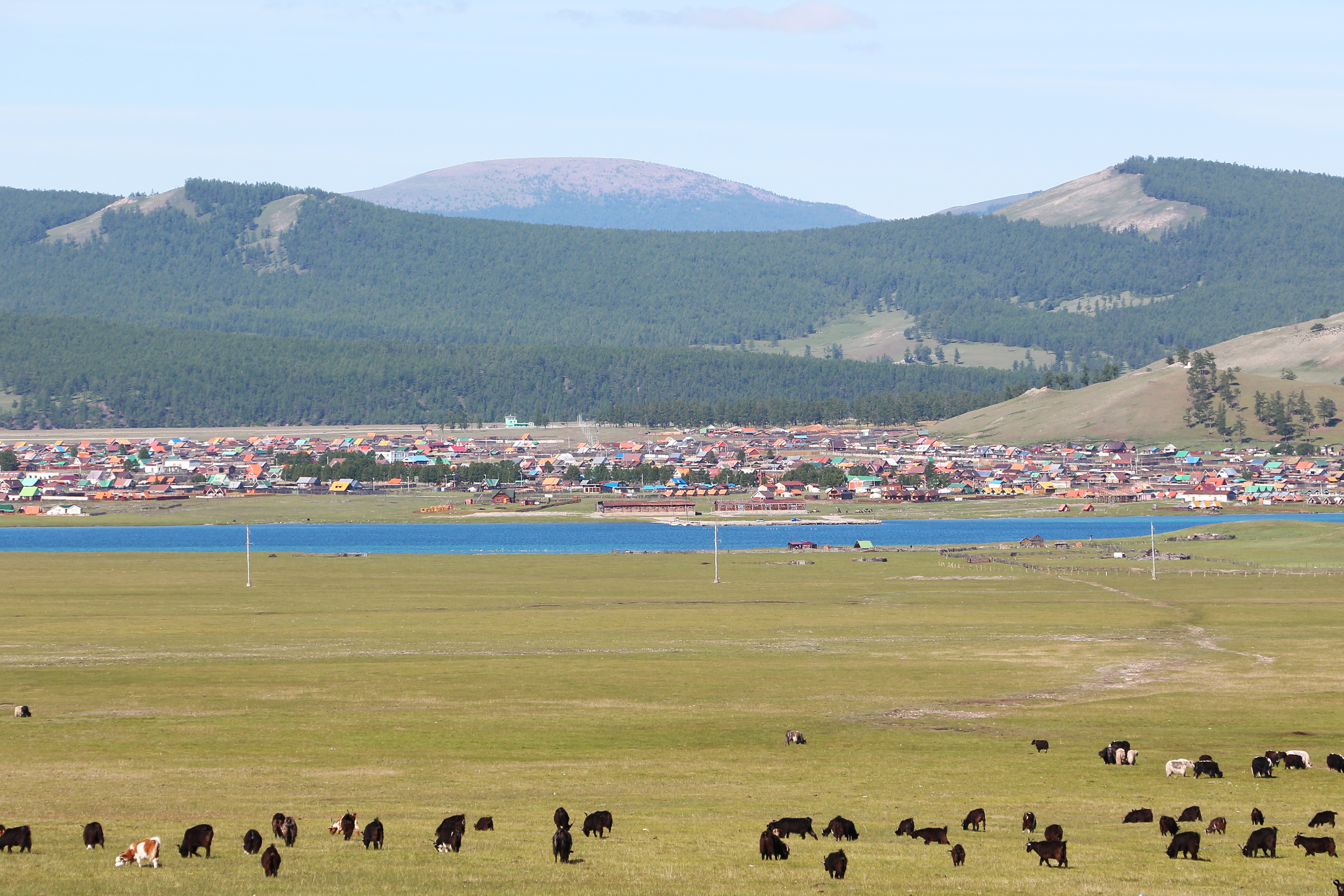
Hatgal (Mongolia)

In this series, five teams start from Palermo in Sicily, and travel 12,000 km across Europe and Asia to finish in Hatgal by Lake Hövsgöl in Mongolia. The series was accompanied by Race Across the World: The Detour, a visualised podcast on BBC iPlayer and BBC Sounds, hosted by Tyler West and Series 4 winner Alfie Watts.

The teams for this series are: best friends, Jo and Kush, siblings, Katie and Harrison, father and daughter, Molly and Andrew, cousins, Puja and Roshni, and in-laws, Mark and Margo. This series was won by Jo and Kush.

== Celebrity series ==
A celebrity spin-off series was first announced in 2019, but production was subsequently delayed due to the COVID-19 pandemic. The line up and route for the first celebrity series was confirmed in a BBC press release on 27 July 2023, and the first series eventually aired on 20 September 2023 on BBC One.

== Reception ==
Race Across the World has received generally positive reviews mixed with some negative reviews. Michael Hogan of The Telegraph found the first series "fiendishly addictive", and thought that it "reaffirmed one's faith in human nature" where friendships are "formed across cultural divides", with the series ending on an act of kindness that was "apt" and "heartwarming". Jeff Robson of the i newspaper regarded the series as "flawed but engaging", and that although the show lacked the "challenges of some extreme travelogues, nor the sense of peril", it "succeeded in recreating the combination of unexpected highlights, soul-destroying lows and crucial budget decisions which characterised old-school seat of the pants travel". Carol Midgley of The Times regarded the challenge of racing to be "quite tough" and "dramatic".

In the second series, Joel Golby of The Guardian judged it "an astounding piece of TV" that "captures all the vibrant highs and exhausted lows of travel in all of their raw glory", and one that made him "genuinely caring how this one ends and the impact it will have on the lives of those who lived it". Anita Singh of The Telegraph thought "the casting is one of the strengths of the series" and she "can't help but warm to these wacky racers", however, Chris Moss of the same paper was more negative; he found that the obstacles the contestants faced were "largely fictive" and the tension "fabricated", and thought the show used the "old idiot abroad trope", and the viewers were "asked not to marvel at faraway places but to engage with the participants". Equally negative was Barry Didcock of The Herald who considered the show's premise of travelling without flying "a frivolous exercise" and of questionable taste as the budget of racers would exceed that of a refugee at the Mexico-Guatemala border. In contrast, Shaun Kitchener wrote in the Metro that the show "is the heartfelt light we all need in these dark times" as it was aired during the COVID-19 pandemic. He noted that with the "masterful combination of escapism (the scenery!), warmth (the contestants!), drama (the conflict!) and adrenaline (the actual race!), Race Across the World is a merciful piece of TV to keep us briefly distracted over the next few weeks".

== Awards and nominations ==
The first series of Race Across the World won the 2020 BAFTA TV Award in the Best Reality and Constructed Factual category. The second series was also nominated.

== International broadcast ==
The programme aired in Australia on the Nine Network in December 2019. In the United States, the series became available on Discovery+ at launch in January 2021.

In Hong Kong, RTHK aired the first two seasons on RTHK TV 31, the first season aired as Race to Singapore in Chinese (鬥快去星洲) from 6 April 2020, while the second season, following on 5 October 2020, title as Race to South America in Chinese under the series of Let’s Explore (一齊闖天下:鬥快去南美). The third season moved to RTHK TV 32 and began on 20 June 2024 and was titled as Race to North America in Chinese (鬥快去北美). The fourth season began on September 2, 2025, and was titled as Race to Indonesia in Chinese and was aired as a section of 31 See the World (31看世界 - 鬥快去印尼).

== International versions ==
Color key

- Currently airing
- Upcoming version or season
- Unknown
- No longer airing/Cancelled

Country	Local name	Network	Narrator/Presenter	Winners	Originally aired
Denmark	Først til verdens ende	TV 2	Pelle Emil Hebsgaard	Series 1 (2020): Nicolaj Halberg & Stephanie Schwartzbach; Series 2 (2022): Nikolaj Saabye & Jeppe Saabye; Series 3 (2023): Heidi Rasmussen & Susie Rasmussen; Series 4 (2024): Emilie Thygesen & Nadine Østby Hajjar; Series 5 (2025): Jeanette Villadsen & Johnni Damkjær; Series 6 (2026): Ida Imilia Aastrup & Julia Sofia Aastrup	31 March 2020
Finland	Race Across the World Suomi	MTV3	Ernest Lawson	Series 1 (2024): Jutta Larm & Juha Larm; Series 2 (2025): Sini-Maria "Sini Sabotage" Makkonen & Sergey Hilman; Series 3 (2026): Upcoming series	16 March 2024
Germany	Terra X – Wettlauf um die Welt	ZDF	Ingo Abel	Series 1 (2025): Carlo Berges & Lykka Kiepert	23 April 2025
Netherlands	Race Across the World	RTL 4	Martijn Krabbé	Series 1 (2023): Eva Cleven & Hugo Kennis	15 March 2023
Norway	Først til verdens ende	TVNorge	Martin Johnsrud Sundby	Series 1 (2025): Markus Neby & Ronny Brede Aase	12 March 2025
Serbia	Trka oko sveta	RTS 1	TBA	Series 1 (2027): Upcoming series	2027
Spain	Hasta el fin del mundo	La 1	Paula Vázquez	Series 1 (2025–26): Jedet & Andrea Compton; Series 2 (2026–27): Upcoming series	12 November 2025
Sweden	Race Across the World Sverige	Kanal 5	Kristin Kaspersen	Series 1 (2024): Eva Röse & Karin Röse; Series 2 (2025): Tobias Karlsson & Magdalena Forsberg	5 September 2024

=== Danish version ===
Danish TV 2 produced the first international adaptation named Først til verdens ende (translation: "First to the end of the world") in Autumn 2019 with a route between Odense and Singapore. The series began airing on 31 March 2020.

In April 2021, TV2 and production company Strong began casting for a second season with an expected filming period from 10 October until the end of November 2021. The season premiered on 11 April 2022 and saw contestants travelling in a circle around Europe to arrive back in Denmark. During the production, two participants tested positive for COVID-19, causing the competition to come to a halt for 11 days and participants being transported to the next checkpoint, before continuing.

Series	Episodes	Premiere	Finale	Start	End	Winners	DK viewers (Finale)
1	8	31 March 2020	19 May 2020	Odense, Denmark	Singapore	Nicolaj Halberg & Stephanie Schwartzbach	678,000
2	8	11 April 2022	30 May 2022	Esbjerg, Denmark	Copenhagen, Denmark	Nikolaj Saabye & Jeppe Saabye	TBA
3	10	13 March 2023	14 May 2023	New York, USA	Buenos Aires, Argentina	Heidi Rasmussen & Susie Rasmussen	TBA
4	10	18 March 2024	17 May 2024	Tokyo, Japan	Bali, Indonesia	Emilie Thygesen & Nadine Østby Hajjar	TBA
5	10	14 July 2025	15 September 2025	Grand Canyon, USA	Key West, USA	Jeanette Villadsen & Johnni Damkjær	TBA
6	8	28 February 2026	18 April 2026	Amazon, Brazil	Osorno, Chile	Ida Imilia Aastrup & Julia Sofia Aastrup	TBA

On 23 May 2022, a third season was announced with casting starting the same day. The season premiered on 11 March 2023 and shows contestants travelling from New York City in USA to Buenos Aires in Argentina.

On 3 May 2024, a fifth season was announced and is set to be filmed from 7 October to 8 December 2024.

=== Finnish version ===
In November 2023, it was announced, that Finnish network MTV3 would air their local version named Race Across the World Suomi (translation: "Race Across the World Finland") in spring of 2024 hosted by Ernest Lawson. The race started in Morocco, Northern Africa and saw contestants travelling through Europe and finishing in Finland.

Series	Episodes	Premiere	Finale	Start	End	Winners	FIN viewers (Finale)
1	9	16 March 2024	4 May 2024	Marrakesh, Morocco	Helsinki, Finland	Jutta & Juha Larm	TBA
2	TBA	5 April 2025	TBA	Istanbul, Turkey	Turku, Finland	TBA	TBA

=== German version ===
In August 2021, it was revealed that Germany's RTL Zwei was preparing an adaptation of the format for the German audience. In March 2024, it was reported that Tower Productions would begin filming a six-part series for ZDF in the fall. It is set to be aired in Spring 2025. The show was moved to ZDFneo after the first episode due to low ratings.

Series	Episodes	Premiere	Finale	Start	End	Winners	GER viewers (Finale)
1	6	23 April 2025	28 May 2025	Pucallpa, Peru	Ushuaia, Argentina	Carlo Berges & Lykka Kiepert	TBA

=== Other versions ===
A Dutch version of the show was filmed in Latin America. Presented by Martijn Krabbé, it began airing on 15 March 2023.

== See also ==
- The Amazing Race
- Celebrity Race Across the World
- Race Around the World (Australia)
- Race the World (China)
- Lost (UK, 2001)
- Peking Express
