= Samuel Gardiner (author) =

Anglican priest and author on angling

Samuel Gardiner (born 1563 or 1564), was the author of A Booke of Angling or Fishing. Wherein is shewed by conference with Scriptures the agreement between the Fishermen, Fishes, Fishing, of both natures, Temporall and Spirituall, Math. iv. 19. Printed by Thomas Purfoot, 1606.

== Biography ==
All that is known of him is that he was a Doctor of Divinity and chaplain to Archbishop Abbot. Only two copies of his book are known. One is in the Bodleian, the other in the Huth Library, whither it came from the library of John Cotton, late ordinary of Newgate. It is dedicated to Sir H. Gaudie, Sir Miles Corbet, Sir Hammond Le-Strang and Sir H. Spellman.

An analysis of the book is given in Bibliotheca Piscatoria (p. 103), by Hone, and by the writer in The Angler's Note-Book (2nd ser. No. 1, p. 5). Other instances of moralised angling are given in Bibl. Pisc., p. 41, and in Boyle's 'Reflections' (Works, 6 vols., London, 1772, passim, and especially ii.399).

Also see Alumni Cantab.: pt. 1 (Gardiner, Samuel; adm. 1581 age 17; of Norwich; matr. 1581; BA 1586, MA 1589, DD 1601; R. of Rainham, Norfolk 1581, V. of Ormesby 1588-1631, R. of Gt. Dunham 1599-1616, Lecturer at St. Peter Mancroft, Norwich 1620-32) (source: LC authority file)

== Works ==
The following works were also written by Gardiner:

1. The Cognisance of a True Christian, 1597
2. A Pearle of Price, 1600, dedicated to the Right Hon. Sir T. Egerton, lord keeper; Gardiner speaks of his having relieved 'my poore person and afflicted condition.'
3. Doomes Day Book or Alarum for Atheistes, 1600
4. A Dialogue between Irenæus and Antimachus about the Rites and Ceremonies of the Church of England, 1605...
5. The Foundation of the Faythfull, 1610
6. The Scourge of Sacriledge, 1611. Gardiner's favourite sport of angling furnishes him in both these latter sermons with curious opportunities to moralise; he tells in the latter how Satan plays an old sinner for a time, "dallieth and giveth him length enough of line to scudde up and downe and to swallow up the baite, thereby to make him sure. So when he had gotten a Pharisee by the gilles he made good sport with him", &c
7. The Way to Heaven, 1611.
