= Race Across the World series 2 =

Second series of Race Across the World

Race Across the World
- Series 2
- Presented by: John Hannah (narrator)
- No. of days: 54
- No. of contestants: 10
- Winners: Emon and Jamiul Choudhury
- No. of legs: 8
- Distance traveled: 25,000 km (16,000 mi)
- No. of episodes: 9

Release
- Original network: BBC Two
- Original release: 8 March – 3 May 2020

Season chronology
- ← Previous; Series 1 Next → Series 3

The second series of Race Across the World began airing on 8 March 2020 with five teams setting off from Chapultepec Castle in Mexico City in a race to the most southerly city in the world, Ushuaia in Argentina, covering a distance of 25,000 km in 2 months, passing through 7 checkpoints in Honduras, Panama, Colombia, Peru, Brazil, and Argentina. Each racer was given £1,453 for the whole trip, roughly £26 per day. Filming started in September 2019.

Start and end points
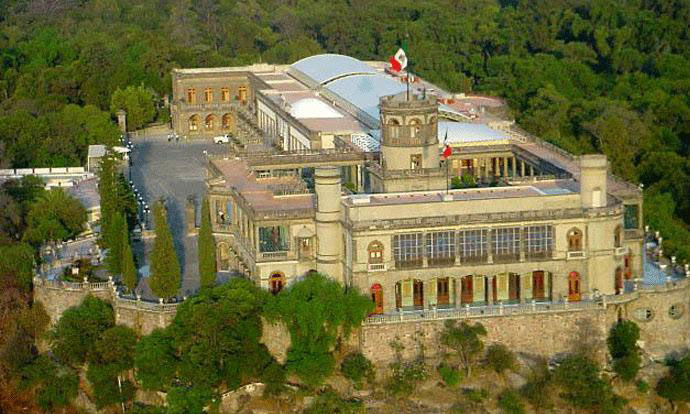
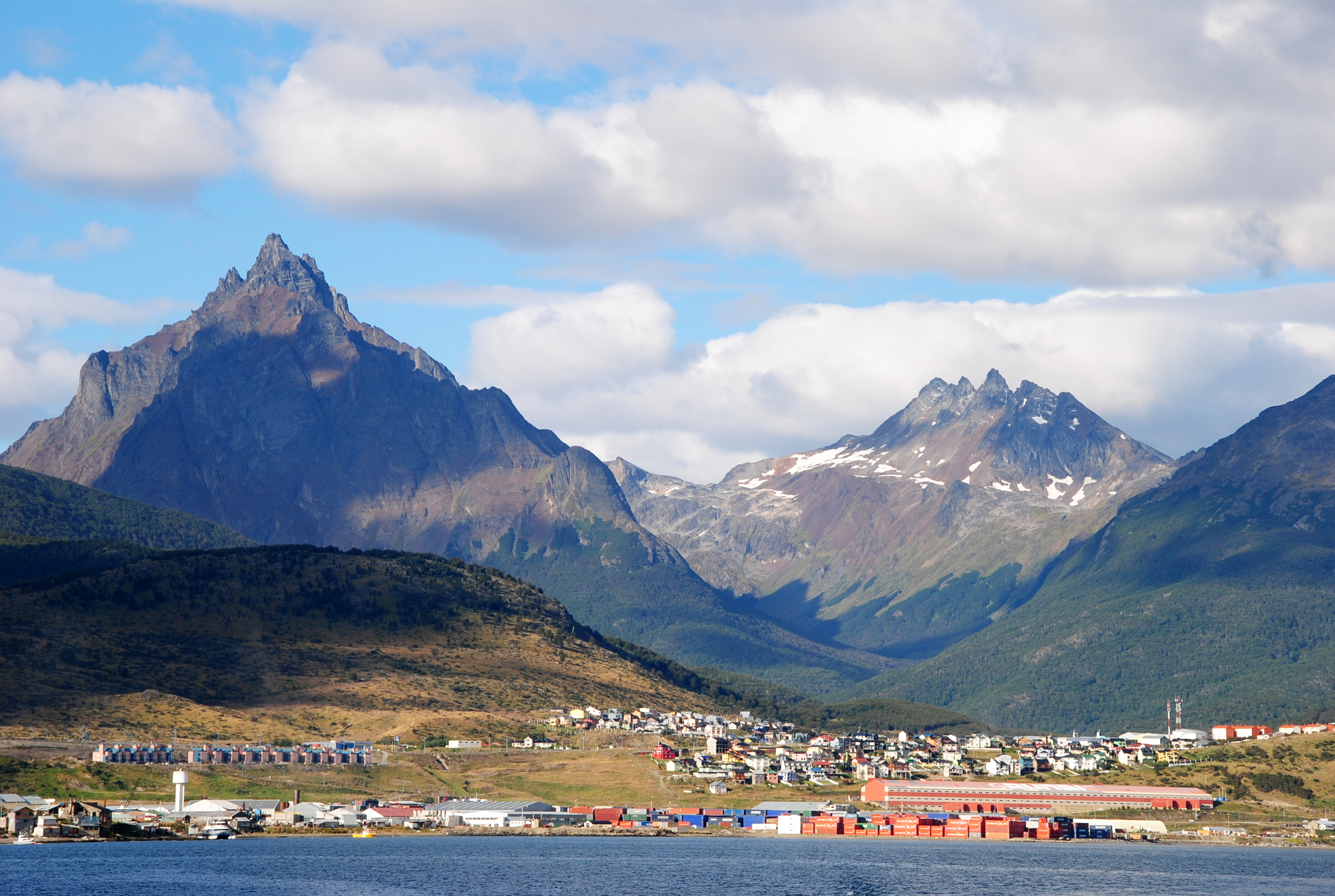
Chapultepec Castle (top) and Ushuaia (bottom)

In this series, the five teams of racers were siblings Dom and Lizzie, mother-and-son Jo and Sam, married couple Jen and Rob, couple Shuntelle and Michael, and uncle-and-nephew Emon and Jamiul. No one was eliminated this series but two teams decided to quit; Shuntelle and Michael left after losing half their money in leg 2 of the race, while Jo and Sam withdrew after they had run out of money in leg 7. The no-fly rule was abandoned this series due to civil unrest in Ecuador which made land travel through the country unsafe, and all the teams were flown from Colombia to Peru to continue the race. The winners were Emon and Jamiul.

The number of episodes increased to nine this series; eight episodes on the race followed by a reunion special.

== Contestants ==
Name	Relationship	Occupation	Age	From	Ref.
Dom Slater	Siblings	Teaching assistant	22	Wetherby	
Lizzie Slater	Siblings	Chalet host	21	Wetherby	
Emon Choudhury	Uncle and nephew	Entrepreneur/business owner	35	Oldham	
Jamiul Choudhury	Uncle and nephew	Architecture graduate	25	Oldham	
Jo Gardiner	Mother and son	Physiotherapist	54	Manchester	
Sam Gardiner	Mother and son	Landscape gardener	19	Manchester	
Jen Lambra-Stokes	Married	Resourcing consultant	33	Reading	
Rob Lambra-Stokes	Married	Systems engineer	33	Reading	
Shuntelle Greenidge	Dating	Project manager	40	South London	
Michael Greenway	Dating	Health and safety construction consultant	47	South London	

== Results summary ==
Colour key:

Team withdrawn
Series winners

Teams	Position (by leg)							
Teams	1	2	3	4	5	6	7	8
Emon and Jamiul	5th	4th	1st	3rd	1st	1st	2nd	Winners
Jen and Rob	3rd	5th	2nd	2nd	2nd	2nd	1st	2nd
Dom and Lizzie	2nd	1st	4th	4th	4th	3rd	3rd	3rd
Jo and Sam	1st	2nd	3rd	1st	3rd	4th	4th	
Shuntelle and Michael	4th	3rd						

== Route ==
The checkpoints in the second series were:

Leg	From	To	Ref
1	Chapultepec Castle; Mexico City, Mexico	Clarion Hotel; Copán Ruinas, Honduras	
2	Clarion Hotel; Copán Ruinas, Honduras	JW Marriott Panama, Panama City, Panama	
3	JW Marriott Panama, Panama City, Panama	Bethel Bio Luxury Hotel, Tatacoa Desert, Colombia	
4	Jaén Airport, Jaén, Peru	GHL Hotel Lago Titicaca, Puno, Peru	
5	GHL Hotel Lago Titicaca, Puno, Peru	Grace Cafayate, Cafayate, Argentina	
6	Grace Cafayate, Cafayate, Argentina	Pousada Portal do Sol, Ilha Grande, Brazil	
7	Pousada Portal do Sol, Ilha Grande, Brazil	Park Hyatt, Mendoza, Argentina	
8	Park Hyatt, Mendoza, Argentina	Summit of Cerro Alarkén, Ushuaia, Argentina	

Checkpoints on Series 2: Checkpoint, Start, Resume, Finish

== Race summary ==
Mode of transportation	Rail Boat / Ship Bus/coach Taxi Private car Aeroplane
Activity	Working for money and/or bed and board Excursion that cost time and money

=== Leg 1: Mexico City, Mexico → Copán Ruinas, Honduras ===
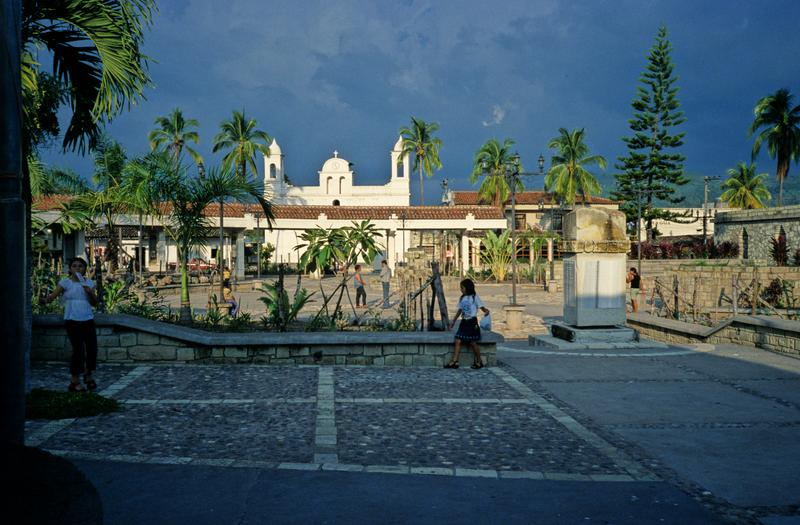
Copán Ruinas

The first checkpoint was Copán Ruinas in Honduras. Shuntelle and Michael decided to travel to the northern Caribbean coast of the Yucatan Peninsula enroute to Belize. Dom and Lizzie chose to go from Oaxaca City to Guatemala via the Pacific coast route, but visited the infinity pool at Hierve el Agua while waiting for a bus at Oaxaca City. Emon and Jamiul chose the interior route so they could see the Mayan ruins at Palenque. Initially they had intended to go via Tonalá, but found that it would mean a six hour detour, and so changed bus half-way through.

Jo and Sam also initially intended to go to Belize, but a stranger in San Cristóbal de las Casas advised them the ideal route was via Guatemala. This proved fortunate as it allowed them to reach Copán Ruinas first on day 6 of the race, despite stopping along the way to work for money at an organic farm in Antigua Guatemala.

At Belize, Shuntelle and Michael and Jen and Rob managed to catch the boat from Placencia to Puerto Cortés in Honduras, but had to take shelter in Honduras after getting caught in Tropical Storm Karen on their way to Copán Ruinas. Emon and Jamiul missed the boat despite taking an expensive taxi ride to Placencia and had to wait until the following day for a boat. They finished last in this leg.

Order	Teams	Route	Time behind leaders	Money left
1	Jo and Sam	→ San Lázaro (TAPO) → San Cristóbal de las Casas → La Mesilla → Antigua → Copán Ruinas	—N/a	87%
2	Dom and Lizzie	→ Northern Bus Terminal → → Oaxaca City / Hierve el Agua → → Tapachula → Tecún Umán → Lake Atitlán → Copán Ruinas	6	88%
3	Jen and Rob	→ Puebla → → Puebla → Frontera Corozal → Bethel → Belmopan → Placencia → Puerto Cortés → Copán Ruinas	22	
4	Shuntelle and Michael	→ Mérida → Tulum → Belize City → Caye Caulker → Belize City → Placencia → Puerto Cortés → Copán Ruinas	23	78%
5	Emon and Jamiul	→ → Palenque → Belmopan → Placencia → Puerto Cortés → Copán Ruinas	33	

=== Leg 2: Copán Ruinas, Honduras → Panama City, Panama ===
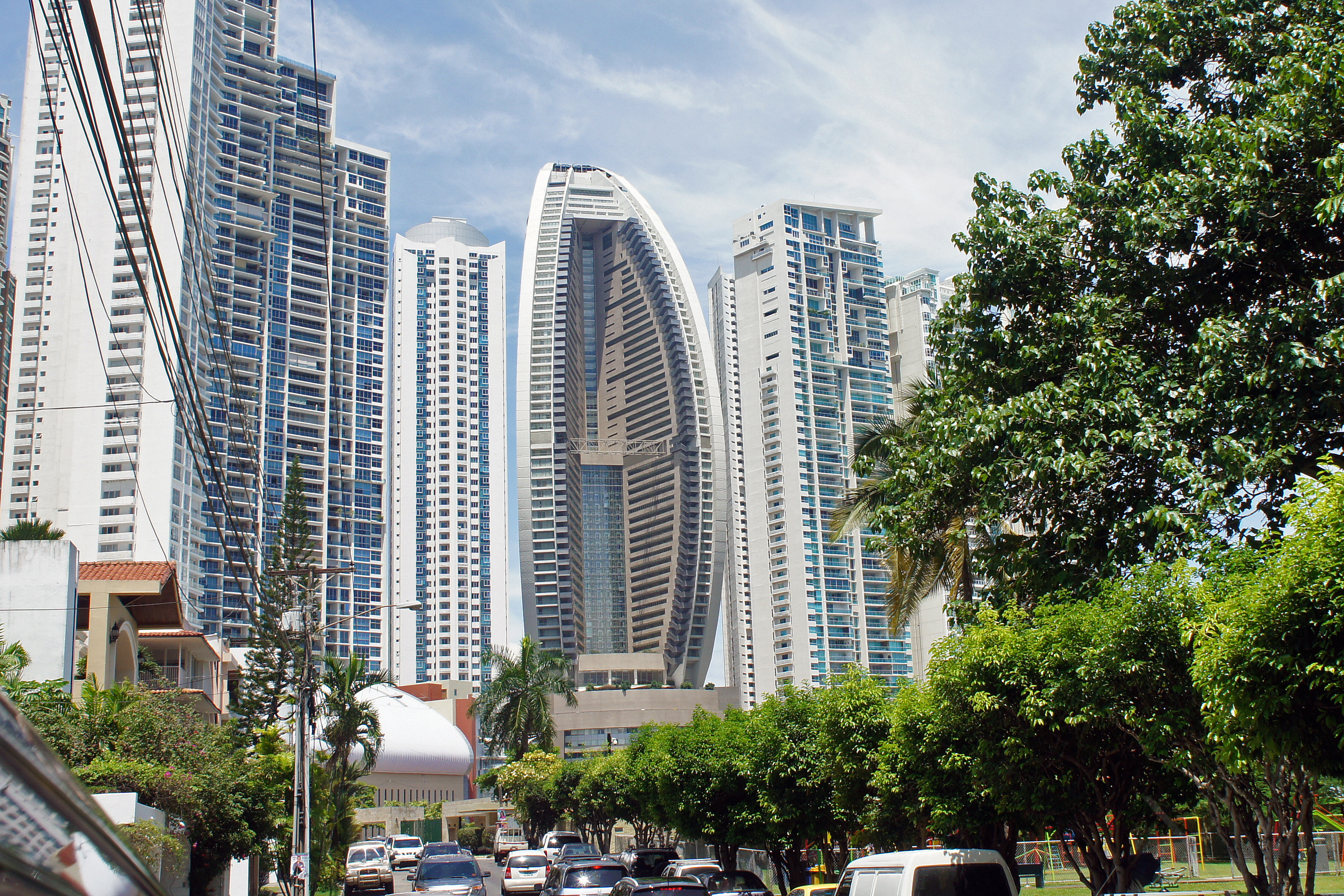
JW Marriott Panama, Panama City

Jo and Sam chose to go through El Salvador to get to Nicaragua. Although they were the first team to leave, they worked for a day at a hostel in El Cuco, El Salvador collecting turtle eggs to earn some money, which lost them their lead. In an effort to get to the front, Dom and Lizzie decided to travel non-stop in Honduras from Santa Rosa de Copán on back-to-back buses, hopping from town to town, and became the first team to cross into Nicaragua. After stopping in Limón, Costa Rica to work in a farm with the Bribri tribe, they arrived at the checkpoint in Panama City first on Day 14 of the race.

As they were a long way behind, Emon and Jamiul took the faster CA1 route via San Salvador to make up time. They also took an expensive direct bus ride from Managua to David, Panama. They overtook Jen and Rob, who took a break in León and the Monteverde Cloud Forest Reserve and were the last team to arrive at Panama City.

In Honduras, after buying food at a stop, Michael found that he had lost his money belt containing £1,155, more than half of the team's remaining funds. Even though they tried to earn some money at the Ballena National Marine Park, Shuntelle and Michael decided to quit the race at the second checkpoint as they felt they could no longer compete with so little money left.

Order	Teams	Route	Time behind leaders	Money left
1	Dom and Lizzie	→ Santa Rosa de Copán → → Peñas Blancas → Limón → Panama City (Albrook) → Plaza Francia → JW Marriott Panama	—N/a	74%
2	Jo and Sam	→ San Salvador → El Cuco → Managua → → Panama City (Albrook) → Plaza Francia → JW Marriott Panama	2.5	75%
3	Shuntelle and Michael^{[a]}	→ Santa Rosa de Copán → Comayagua → → → Managua → Ballena National Marine Park → Panama City (Albrook) → Plaza Francia → JW Marriott Panama	4.5	14%
4	Emon and Jamiul	→ Santa Rosa de Copán → San Salvador → León → Managua → David → Panama City	20	60%
5	Jen and Rob	→ Santa Rosa de Copán → León → Monteverde / Monteverde Cloud Forest Reserve → Panama City	21.5	74%

^Note a Shuntelle and Michael withdrew from the race after losing over a thousand pounds.

=== Leg 3: Panama City, Panama → Tatacoa Desert, Colombia ===
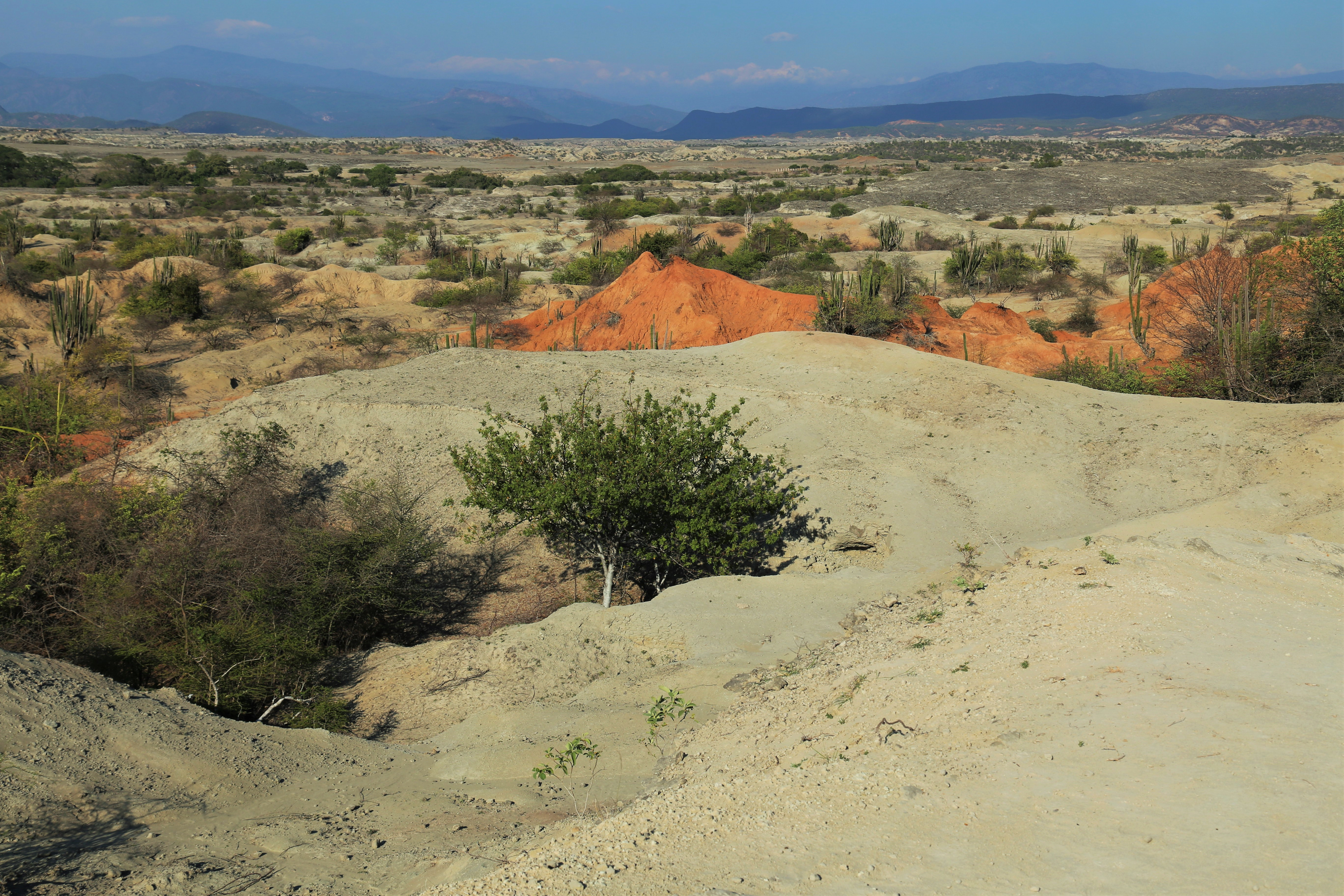
Tatacoa Desert

The original destination was to be Quito, Ecuador; however, due to civil unrest, the checkpoint was moved to the Bethel Hotel near Villavieja in the Tatacoa Desert of Colombia. The teams were instructed to avoid the Darién Gap, so they travelled by sea over the northern coast of Panama from Puerto Tupile in Cartí to the Colombian town Capurganá.

Although Dom and Lizzie were the first to leave, they had to stay overnight at Playón Chico and then missed the boat from Capurganá to Necoclí. As a result, all the teams met up at the port, just as two teams were queuing to leave for Necoclí. Jen and Rob managed to catch the next boat 5 minutes later, but Emon and Jamiul wrongly believed they had missed their chance, and decided to stay for a day at Capurganá and worked at a local scuba-diving school. Fortuitously, they were advised by the locals to travel on an obscure route from Medellín to Neiva. This choice helped them leap to the front, and they reached the checkpoint in the Tatacoa Desert near Villavieja first.

In order to save on accommodation cost, Jen and Rob took two night buses to reach Bogotá via Medellín. After a night in Bogotá, they took a bus heading to Neiva, but arranged a drop-off near Villavieja to avoid a detour. They then trekked to a river, crossing it by boat before reaching the checkpoint to finish second. Jo and Sam decided to take a break at Medellín to relieve the stress of travelling. They then travelled via Cali where they tried to work in a dance club La Matraca, although Sam failed to complete his work as he found it stressful. Dom and Lizzie took a detour to work at Guatapé before going to Bogotá. However, this choice cost them the lead, and they finished behind all the other teams.

Order	Teams	Route	Time behind leaders	Money left
1	Emon and Jamiul	→ Cartí → Ustupo → Capurganá → Necoclí → Medellín → Neiva → Villavieja → Tatacoa Desert	—N/a	44%
2	Jen and Rob	→ Cartí → Playón Chico → Capurganá → Necoclí → Medellín → Bogotá → Magdalena River → Villavieja → Tatacoa Desert	2.5	57%
3	Jo and Sam	→ Cartí → Capurganá → Necoclí → Medellín → Cali → Neiva → Villavieja → Tatacoa Desert	9.5	54%
4	Dom and Lizzie	→ Cartí → Playón Chico → Capurganá → Necoclí → Medellín → Guatapé → Bogotá → Neiva → Villavieja → Tatacoa Desert	12	53%

=== Leg 4: Jaén, Peru → Puno, Peru ===
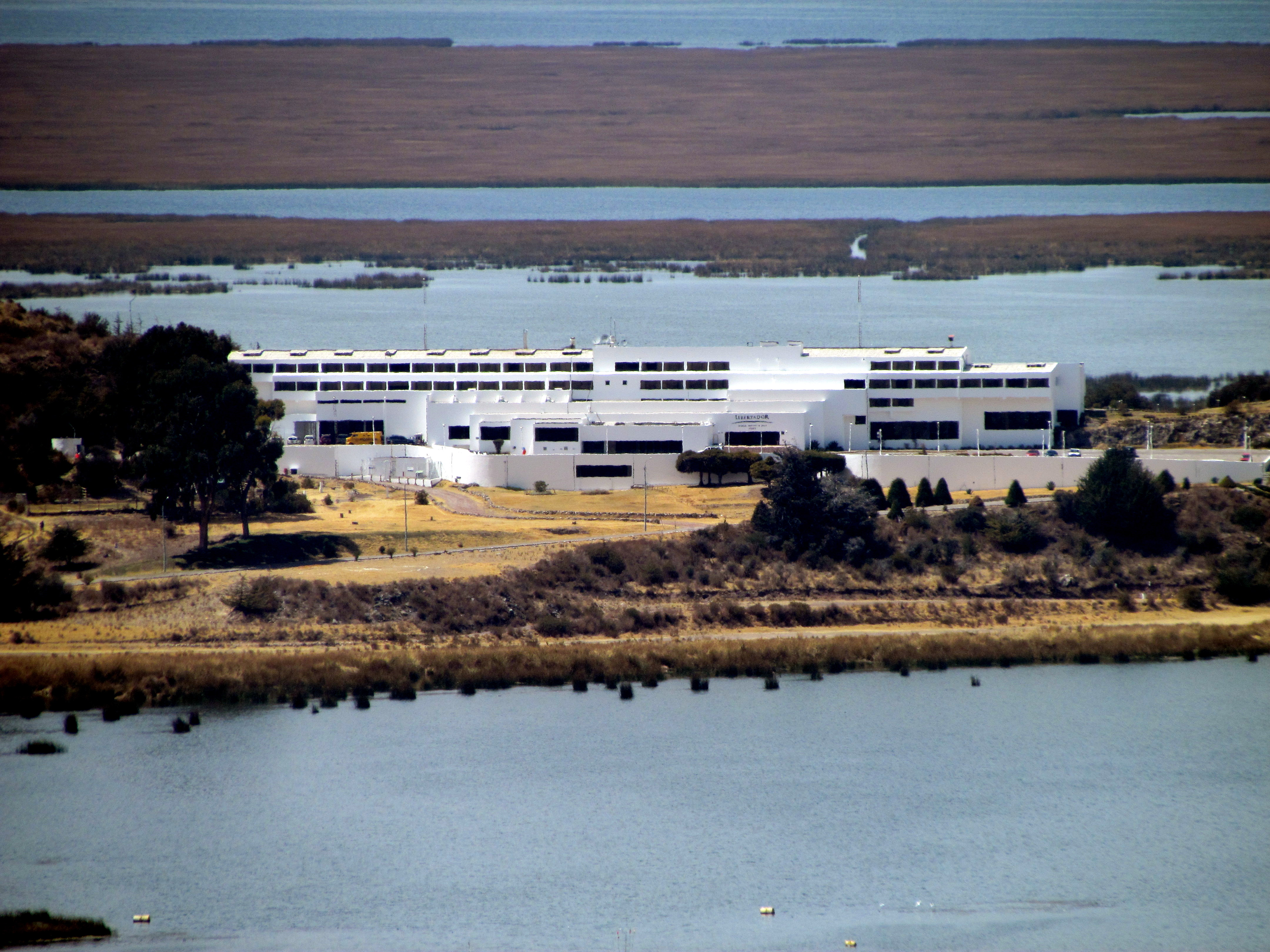
Hotel in Puno

Due to the continuing civil unrest in Ecuador, the teams were not allowed to travel to Peru by land or sea and were flown to the nearest airport in Jaén in Peru to continue the race. The teams left the Jaén airport in the same order that they arrived in at the checkpoint in the Tatacoa Desert. All the teams went down to the coast to travel to Peru's capital Lima. Emon and Jamiul went to Trujillo and they worked with fishermen for bed and board at Huanchaco, while Jen and Rob went via Chiclayo to a sanctuary for the spectacled bear. They again employed the strategy of travelling on a night bus to save on accommodation.

Both Jo and Sam and Dom and Lizzie also went to Lima via Chiclayo. Jo and Sam chose a more expensive bus ride for greater comfort, as well as taking a break to go sandboarding in the desert oasis of Huacachina near Ica before travelling to their destination in Puno, which depleted their funds. However, as they did not stop to work along the way, Jo and Sam reached the checkpoint first, a hotel on an island connected to the shore of Lake Titicaca at Puno.

Both Emon and Jamiul and Dom and Lizzie went from Lima to Puno via a steeper route through Cusco. Although ahead of the others, Emon and Jamiul took a detour to see the Rainbow Mountain. Jen and Rob travelled in a slower but more gradual climb to Puno via Arequipa. They reached Puno at the same time as Emon and Jamiul, and beat them to the second spot at the checkpoint on Day 27.

Dom and Lizzie spent a night working at a bar in Cusco. It delayed their journey to Puno, and they finished last for the second time.

Order	Teams	Route	Time behind leaders	Money left
1	Jo and Sam	→ Jaén → Chiclayo → Lima → Ica → Huacachina → Puno	—N/a	
2	Jen and Rob	→ Jaén → Chiclayo → Chaparri Reserve → Lima → Arequipa → Puno	1.5	
3	Emon and Jamiul	→ Jaén → Huanchaco → Trujillo → → Lima → Cusco → Rainbow Mountain → Sicuani → Puno	1.5	37%
4	Dom and Lizzie	→ Jaén → Chiclayo → Lima → Cusco → Puno	8.5	

=== Leg 5: Puno, Peru → Cafayate, Argentina ===
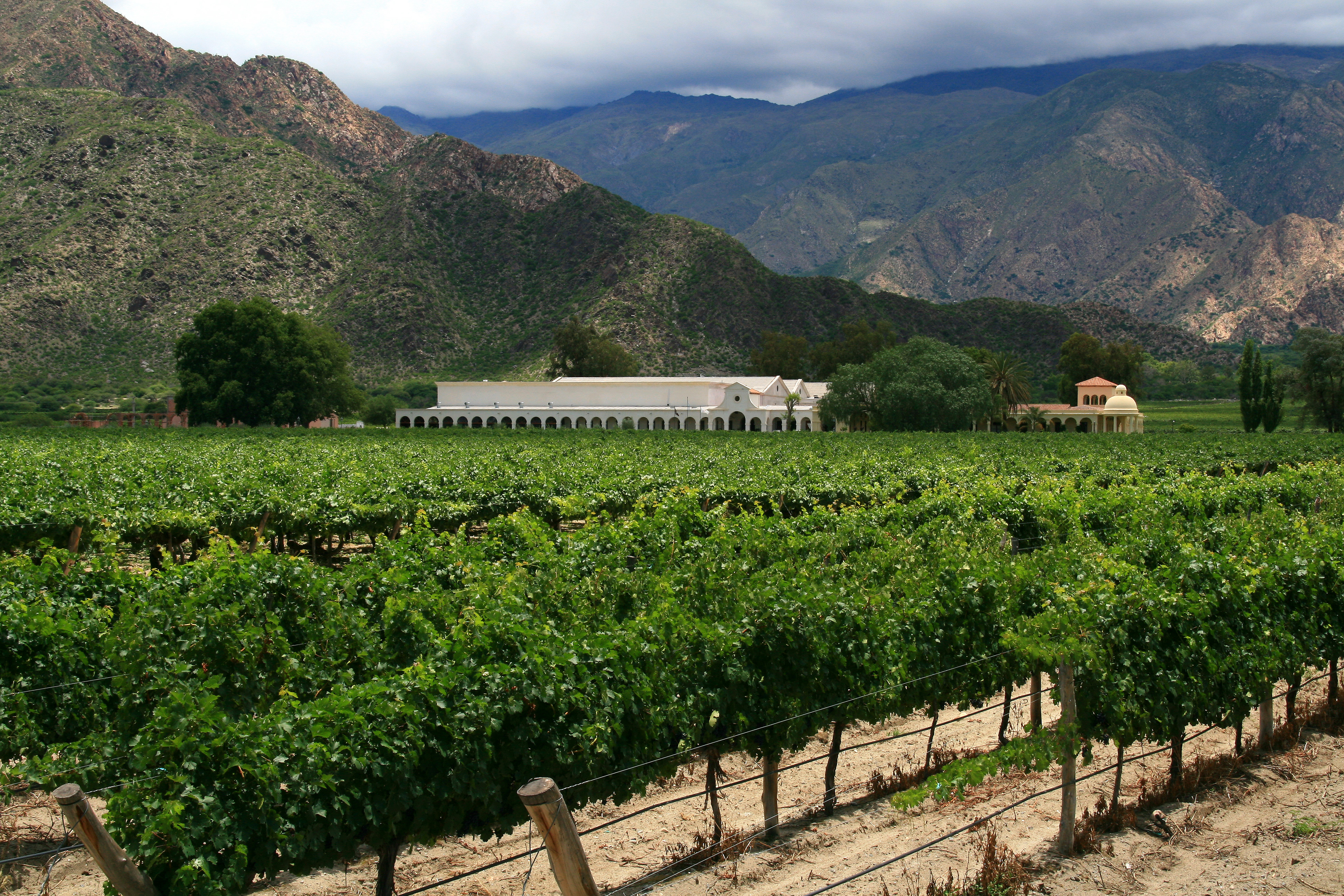
A vineyard in Cafayate

All three teams apart from Dom and Lizzie went through Bolivia to reach their destination in this leg, which was at a vineyard outside of Cafayate in Argentina. The three teams travelled via La Paz but needed to pass through Bolivia within three days due to a pending election which would close the border.

Emon and Jamiul visited Valle de la Luna near La Paz and worked at the salt flat of Salinas Grandes to earn some extra money, but still managed to reach the checkpoint Grace Cafayate first on Day 33.

Jo and Sam visited the salt flat of Salar de Uyuni before taking a train from Uyuni to the border town of Villazón to cross into Argentina, where they worked for bed and board in Quebrada de Humahuaca before travelling to Cafayate.

Dom and Lizzie chose to go via Chile as the high altitude was making Dom feeling unwell. Dom suffered a seizure while trying to leave Puno, and was forced to stay an extra day back at the checkpoint hotel, before he and Lizzie left 35 hours after the leaders. In order to catch up, they travelled on back-to-back buses, but were trapped at San Pedro de Atacama by a lack of connecting routes, so were forced to take a break in the Atacama Desert. However, civil unrest broke out in Chile and they had to be evacuated to Argentina by car. They were again the last team to arrive at the checkpoint.

Order	Teams	Route	Time behind leaders	Money left
1	Emon and Jamiul	→ La Paz / Valle de la Luna → Uyuni → Salinas Grandes → Salta → Cafayate	—N/a	30%
2	Jen and Rob	→ La Paz → Uyuni → Salta → Cafayate	4.5	44%
3	Jo and Sam	→ La Paz → Uyuni / Salar de Uyuni → Villazón → Quebrada de Humahuaca → Salta → Cafayate	10	31%
4	Dom and Lizzie	→ Tacna → Arica → Calama → San Pedro de Atacama → → Cafayate	29.5	34%

=== Leg 6: Cafayate, Argentina → Ilha Grande, Brazil ===
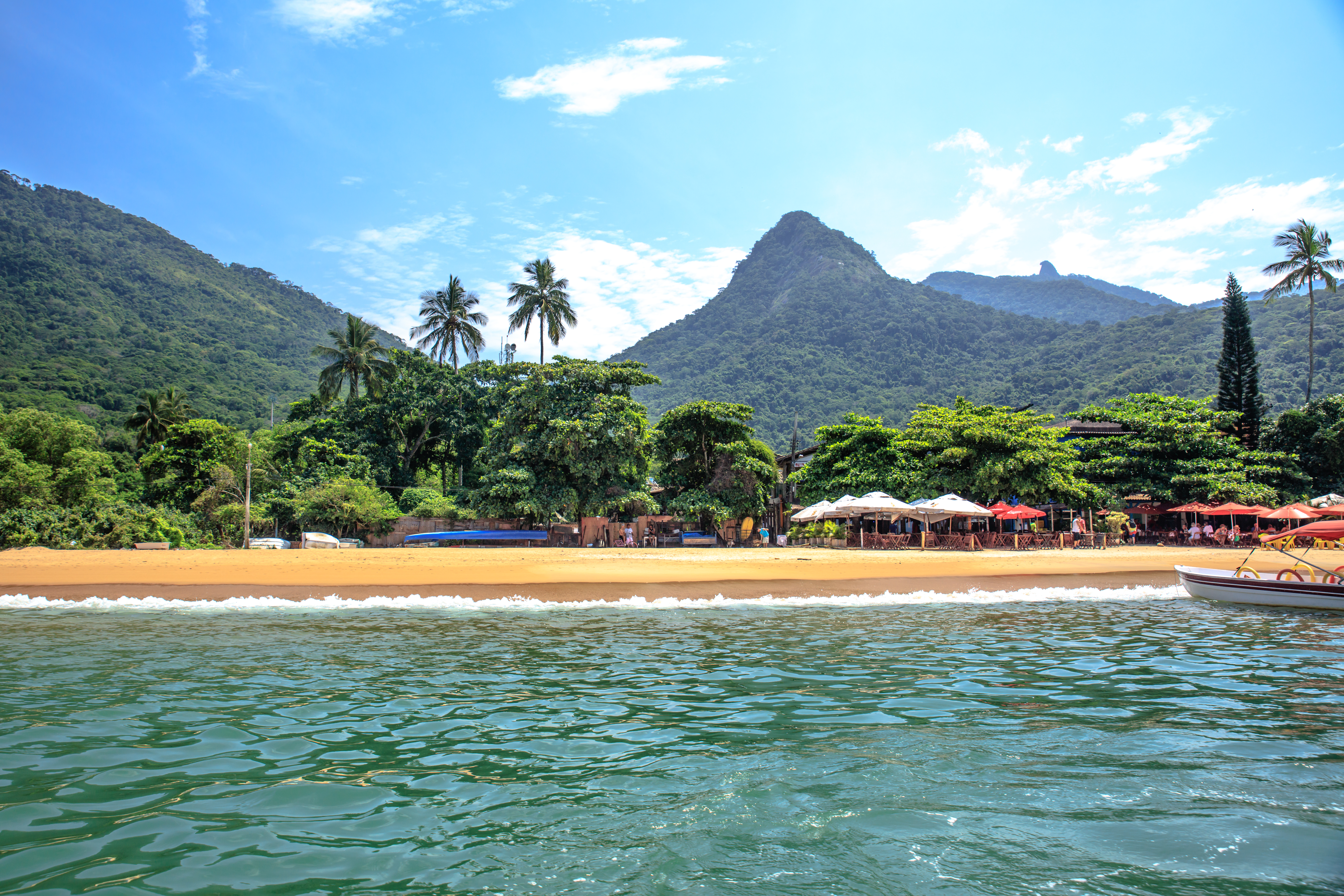
Ilha Grande

The racers embarked on the longest leg of the race so far, travelling 3,600 kilometres (2,200 mi) east to Ilha Grande in Brazil. The long journey through expensive countries forced all the teams to spend heavily.

3 teams concluded that they had to travel via Salta to catch a bus to the border. Both Emon and Jamiul and Jen and Rob chose a shorter route via Paraguay. Emon and Jamiul stopped at Asunción to work in a retirement home. Jen and Rob went to see the Iguazu Falls, and they also took a longer detour for a break to attend the Oktoberfest at Blumenau, which delayed their journey further. They finished second to Emon and Jamiul on Day 40 of the race.

Both Jo and Sam and Dom and Lizzie went on a longer route from Argentina to Brazil before travelling up along the Atlantic coast. Although Dom and Lizzie were the last to leave, a local in Cafayete informed them about a direct bus route to Corrientes. This allowed them to catch up with Jo and Sam, who had been forced to stay in Salta overnight. Both teams decided to share a mini-van ride to the border with Brazil to avoid further delay.

Jo and Sam went to Praia do Rosa where they worked for bed and board, as well as a chance for Sam to learn how to surf. Both the last two teams arrived at the checkpoint on the island at the same time, with Dom and Lizzie just pipping Jo and Sam to the third spot.

Order	Teams	Route	Time behind leaders	Money left
1	Emon and Jamiul	→ Salta → Formosa → Asunción → Foz do Iguaçu → São Paulo → Angra dos Reis → Ilha Grande	—N/a	18%
2	Jen and Rob	→ Salta → Clorinda → → San Antonio → Asunción → Iguazu Falls → Blumenau → Rio de Janeiro → Conceição de Jacareí → Ilha Grande	6	24%
3	Dom and Lizzie	→ Corrientes → Florianópolis → São Paulo → Angra dos Reis → Ilha Grande	24	16%
4	Jo and Sam	→ Salta → Corrientes → Praia do Rosa → Florianópolis → São Paulo → Angra dos Reis → Ilha Grande	24	10%

=== Leg 7: Ilha Grande, Brazil → Mendoza, Argentina ===
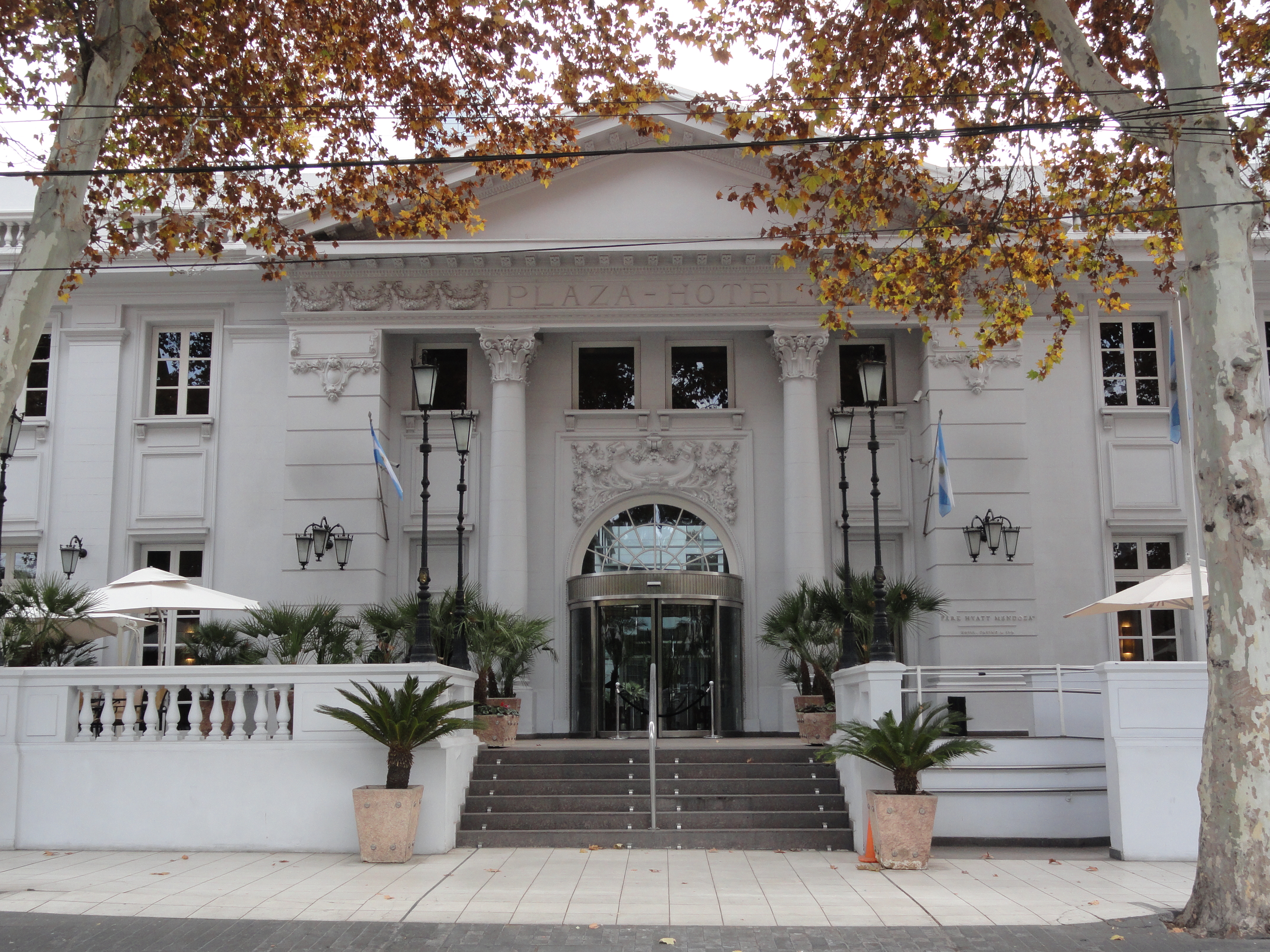
Checkpoint in Mendoza, Argentina

As the teams travelled back to Argentina for the penultimate leg, three faced financial restrictions during the journey. Only Jen and Rob proceeded without this concern, so despite missing their boat and bus and working in a hostel in Porto Alegre, they reached the destination in Mendoza, Argentina first on Day 47.

Emon and Jamiul chose a longer route through Uruguay as they needed to earn money. They cleaned yachts in Punta del Este, and then worked at a barber shop in Buenos Aires. Dom and Lizzie also had to find ways to save on money, and decided to hitch-hike from the border of Argentina to Posadas, where they worked cleaning boats, before travelling to Mendoza.

Jo and Sam no longer had enough money to finish the leg, so were forced to travel in the opposite direction for work in Rio de Janeiro. They also worked on the bus in Argentina to pay for half their fare to go to Córdoba, Argentina, where they worked on a cattle ranch. With their funds virtually gone, they quit the race at the ranch.

Order	Teams	Route	Time behind leaders	Money left
1	Jen and Rob	→ Angra dos Reis → Curitiba → Porto Alegre → Buenos Aires → Mendoza	—N/a	12%
2	Emon and Jamiul	→ Angra dos Reis → → Punta del Este → Montevideo → Colonia del Sacramento → Buenos Aires → Mendoza	4	6%
3	Dom and Lizzie	→ Angra dos Reis → São Paulo → → Posadas → Santa Fe → Mendoza	9	7%
4	Jo and Sam	→ Angra dos Reis → Rio de Janeiro → Puerto Iguazú → Córdoba →		

=== Leg 8: Mendoza, Argentina → Ushuaia, Argentina ===
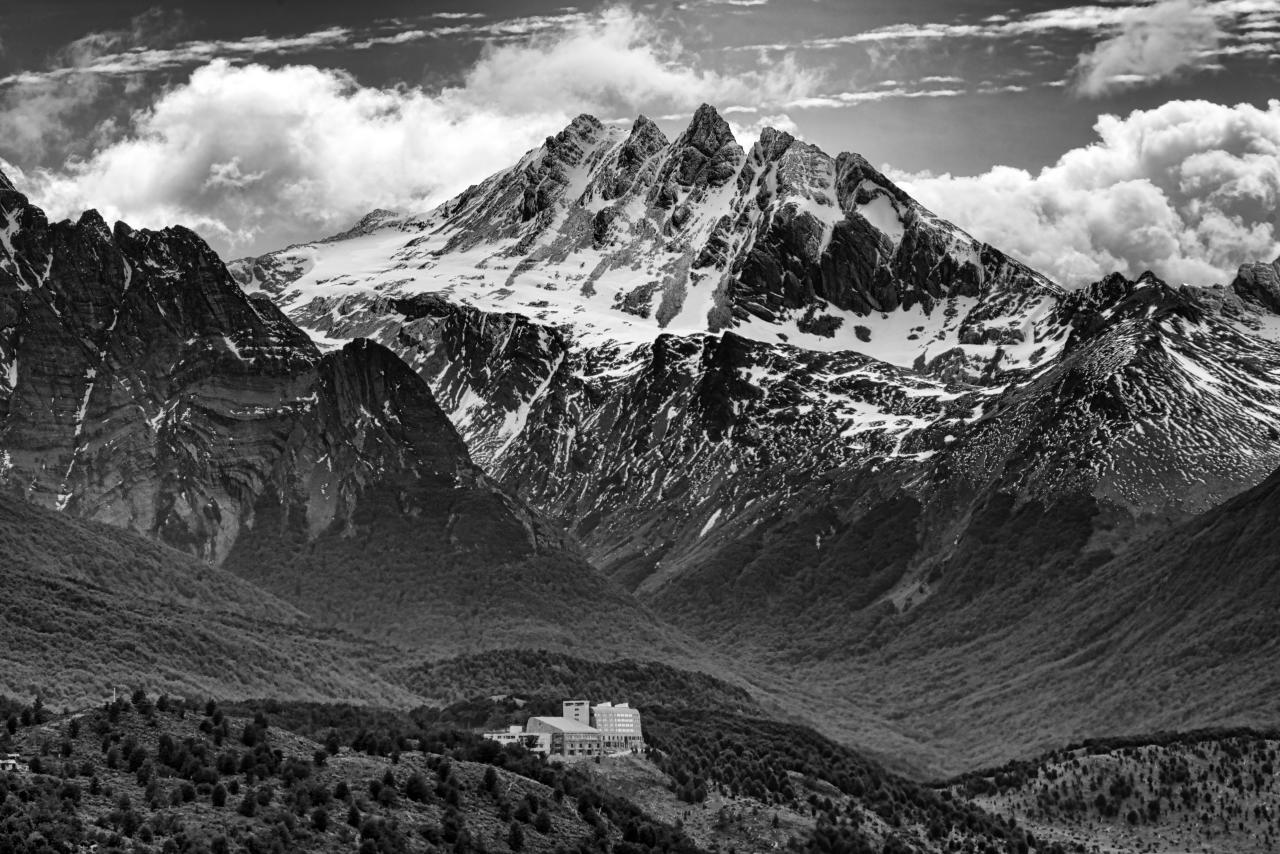
Final checkpoint near hotel (bottom centre) in Ushuaia

Jen and Rob went to Neuquén before deciding to take the mountain route to Bariloche to work. However, travelling to the mountain instead of the faster coastal route delayed their journey. As Emon and Jamiul were running low on money, they decided to work in Mendoza while waiting for a bus to Bahía Blanca. They also worked on a fishing boat in Puerto San Julián. They secured a free ride with a fisherman to Río Gallegos.

Dom and Lizzie also went to Neuquén for work in an almond plantation nearby. They spent most of their money going to Río Gallegos and were the first to arrive there. However, there was no connecting bus to Río Grande until the following day, which allowed all the teams to meet up, and they travelled on the same bus to Río Grande. Dom and Lizzie did not have enough money to pay for a taxi to Ushuaia, so had to hitch-hike all the way and were the last to arrive. Both Jen and Rob and Emon and Jamiul took taxis. Although Emon and Jamiul did not have enough money to pay for all the fare, they negotiated with the driver to pay for the rest of the fare with an mp3 player. Both teams reached Ushuaia around the same time, and in a foot race, first to Arakur Ushuaia hotel and then the final checkpoint at the summit of Cerro Alarkén, Emon and Jamiul beat Jen and Rob to win the race by 20 seconds.

Order	Teams	Route	Time behind leaders	Money left
1	Emon and Jamiul	→ Bahía Blanca → Puerto San Julián → Río Gallegos → Río Grande → Ushuaia	—N/a	£3.38
2	Jen and Rob	→ -Neuquén → Bariloche → Río Gallegos → Río Grande → Ushuaia	0 (20 seconds)	£45.83
3	Dom and Lizzie	→ -Neuquén → Comodoro Rivadavia → Río Gallegos → Río Grande → Ushuaia	2	£18.39

== Reception ==
In the second series, Joel Golby of The Guardian judged it "an astounding piece of TV" that "captures all the vibrant highs and exhausted lows of travel in all of their raw glory", and one that made him "genuinely caring how this one ends and the impact it will have on the lives of those who lived it". Anita Singh of The Telegraph thought "the casting is one of the strengths of the series" and she "can't help but warm to these wacky racers". However, Chris Moss of the same paper was more negative; he found that the obstacles the contestants faced were "largely fictive" and the tension "fabricated", and thought the show used the "old idiot abroad trope", and the viewers were "asked not to marvel at faraway places but to engage with the participants". Equally negative was Barry Didcock of The Herald who considered the show's premise of travelling without flying "a frivolous exercise" and of questionable taste as the budget of racers would exceed that of a refugee at the Mexico-Guatemala border. In contrast, Shaun Kitchener wrote in Metro that the show "is the heartfelt light we all need in these dark times" as it was aired during the COVID-19 pandemic. With the "masterful combination of escapism (the scenery!), warmth (the contestants!), drama (the conflict!) and adrenaline (the actual race!), Race Across the World is a merciful piece of TV to keep us briefly distracted over the next few weeks".

== Ratings ==
The first episode had an overnight rating of 1.9 million. The penultimate episode showing the final leg of the race was watched by an overnight audience of 3.3 million.

Episode	Airdate	7 day viewers (millions)	28 day viewers (millions)	BBC Two weekly ranking
1	8 March 2020	3.104	3.678	1
2	15 March 2020	3.421	3.703	1
3	22 March 2020	3.803	4.128	1
4	29 March 2020	3.812	4.103	1
5	5 April 2020	3.902	4.118	1
6	12 April 2020	4.152	4.346	1
7	19 April 2020	4.395	4.598	1
8	26 April 2020	4.311	4.440	1
9	3 May 2020	2.911	3.063	2
