= Tatacoa Desert =

Arid region in Colombia

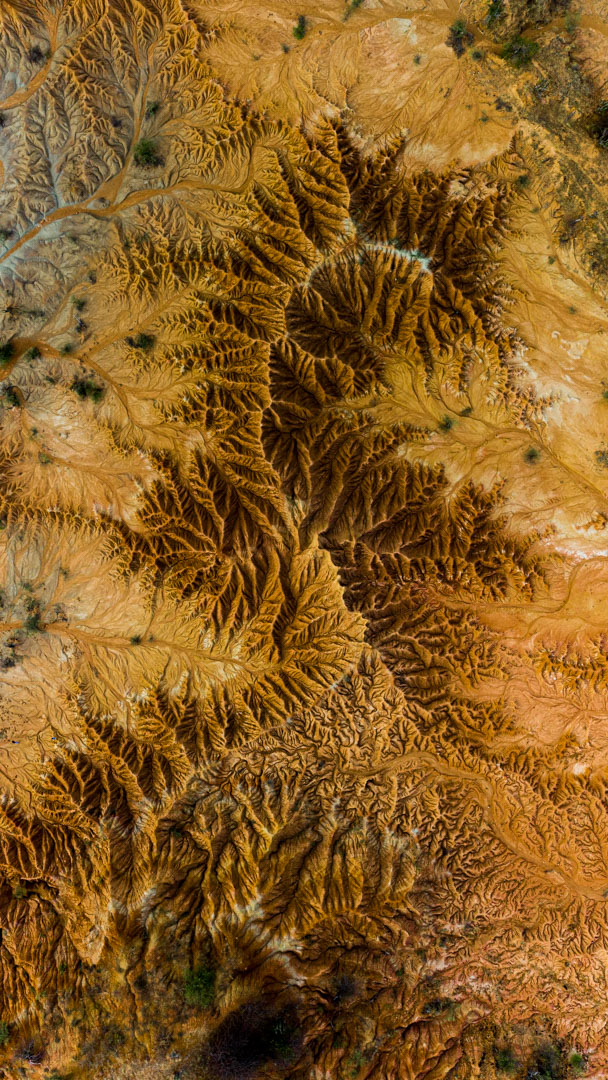

Geography
- Country: Colombia
- District: Huila
- Coordinates: 3.23°N 75.17°W
- Interactive map of Tatacoa Desert

The Tatacoa Desert is the second largest arid zone in Colombia after the Guajira Peninsula. It occupies more than 330 square kilometers. This region is located north of Huila Department, 38 km from the city of Neiva and 15 km (9 mi) from Natagaima in Tolima. It is renowned as a rich deposit of fossils and a tourist destination. The Tatacoa Desert has two distinctive colors: ochre in the area of Cuzco and gray in the Los Hoyos area.

The Tatacoa, or the Valley of Sorrows, as it was called in 1538 by the conquistador Gonzalo Jiménez de Quesada, is not a barren desert but rather a tropical dry forest. The name "Tatacoa", also given by the Spanish, refers to its rattlesnakes. During the Tertiary Period, it was wetter, with thousands of flowers and trees, but has been gradually drying up to become an arid zone.

== Geography ==
The Tatacoa covers 330 square kilometers around the town of Villavieja. The area is heavily eroded and crossed by dry canyons that develop transiently in the winter months. These shapes are created on clay surfaces, creating labyrinthine gullies.

=== Fauna and flora ===
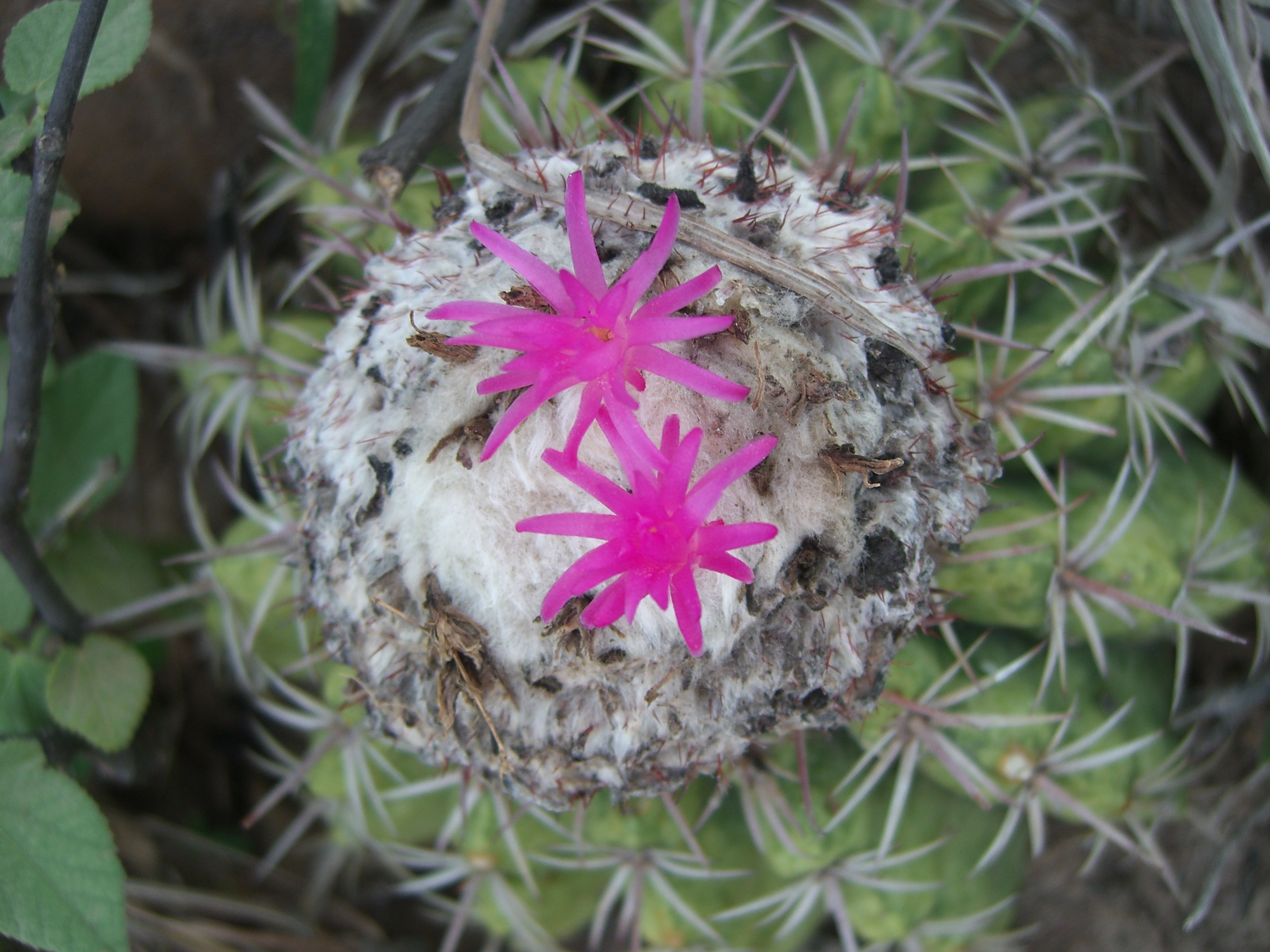
A cactus in the desert

There is relatively little runoff, and animal and plant life is adapted to the conditions of low humidity and high temperatures. The plants in this area are adapted to climatic conditions through the development of horizontal roots of up to 30 meters and vertical roots up to 15 meters deep that facilitate access to water. Wildlife includes turtles, rodents, snakes, spiders, scorpions, eagles, alligators and wildcats, and cacti reaching between four and five meters high.

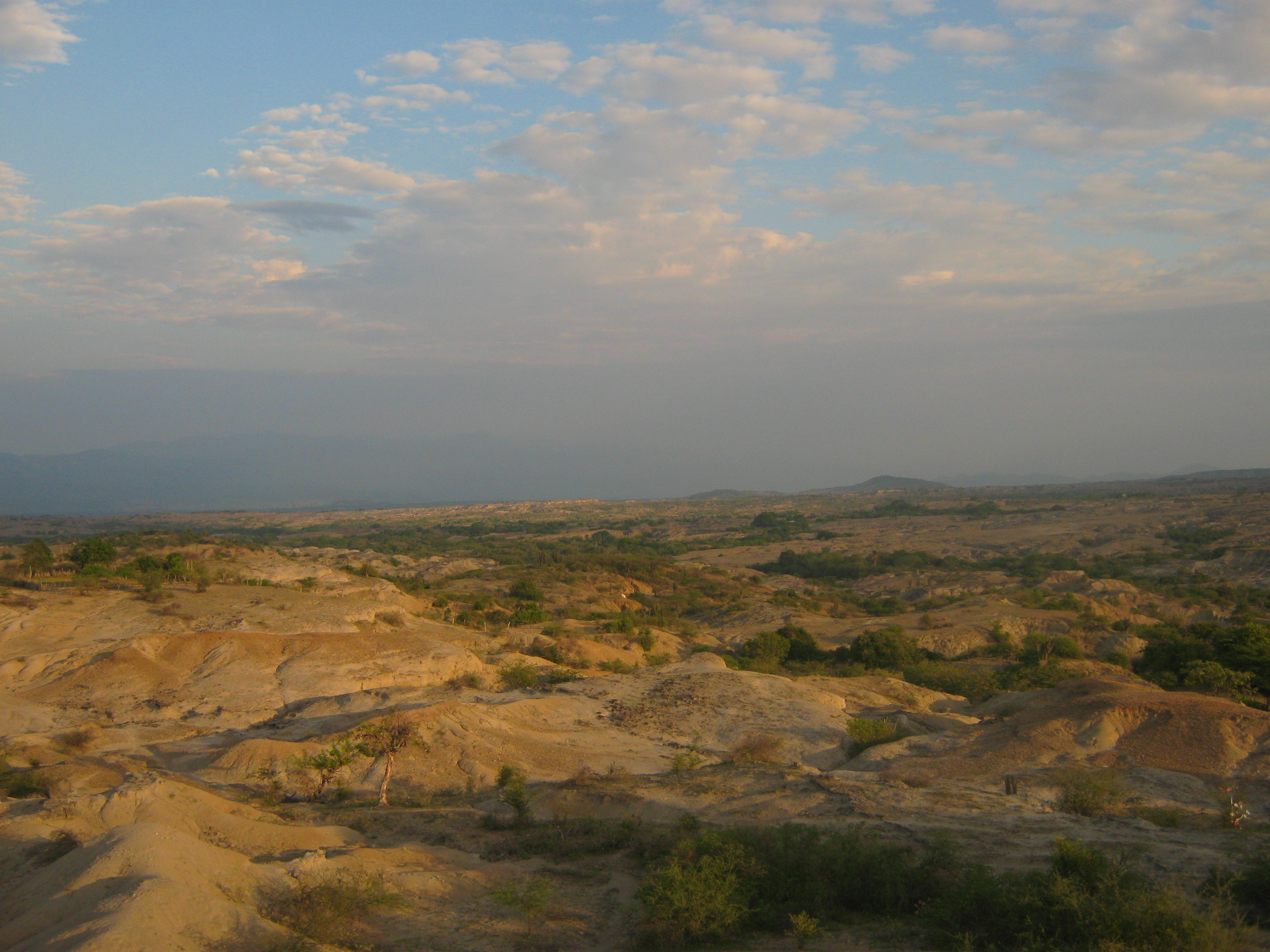
Tatacoa Desert

== Tourism ==
In addition to its geography, its atmospheric conditions are ideal for astronomy. Tatacoa has little pollution or noise, attracting tourists who stay there to enjoy the scenery and tranquility.
