= Villavieja, Huila =

Coordinates: 3°13′N 75°13′W

- Municipality and town
- Flag Coat of arms

- Location of the municipality and town of Villavieja, Huila in the Huila Department of Colombia.
- Country: Colombia
- Department: Huila Department
- Elevation: 430 m (1,410 ft)
- Time zone: UTC-5 (Colombia Standard Time)

Villavieja is a town and municipality in the Huila Department, Colombia. The municipality covers most of the Tatacoa Desert. The town is built on the banks of the Magdalena River.

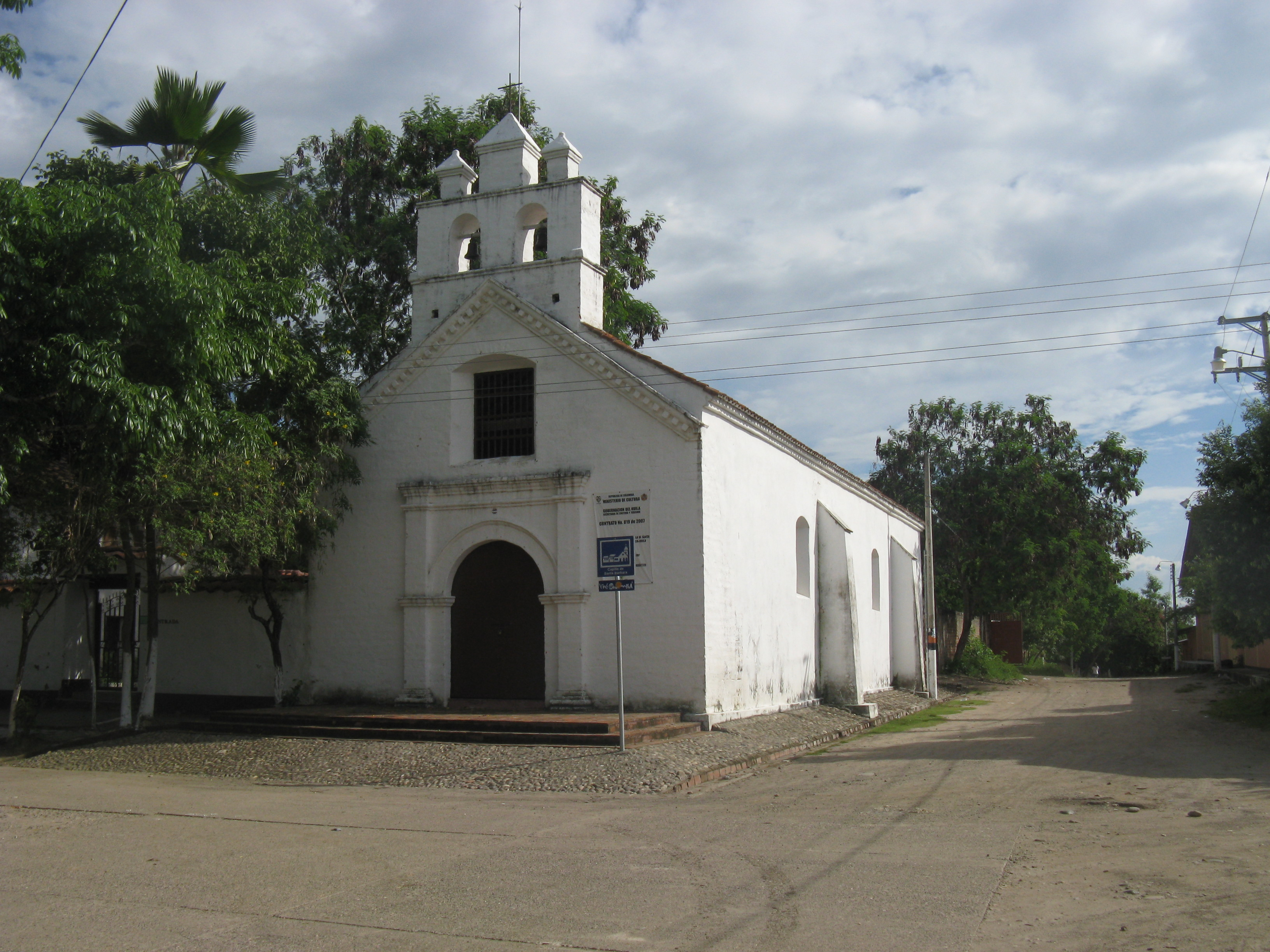
Church in Villa Vieja

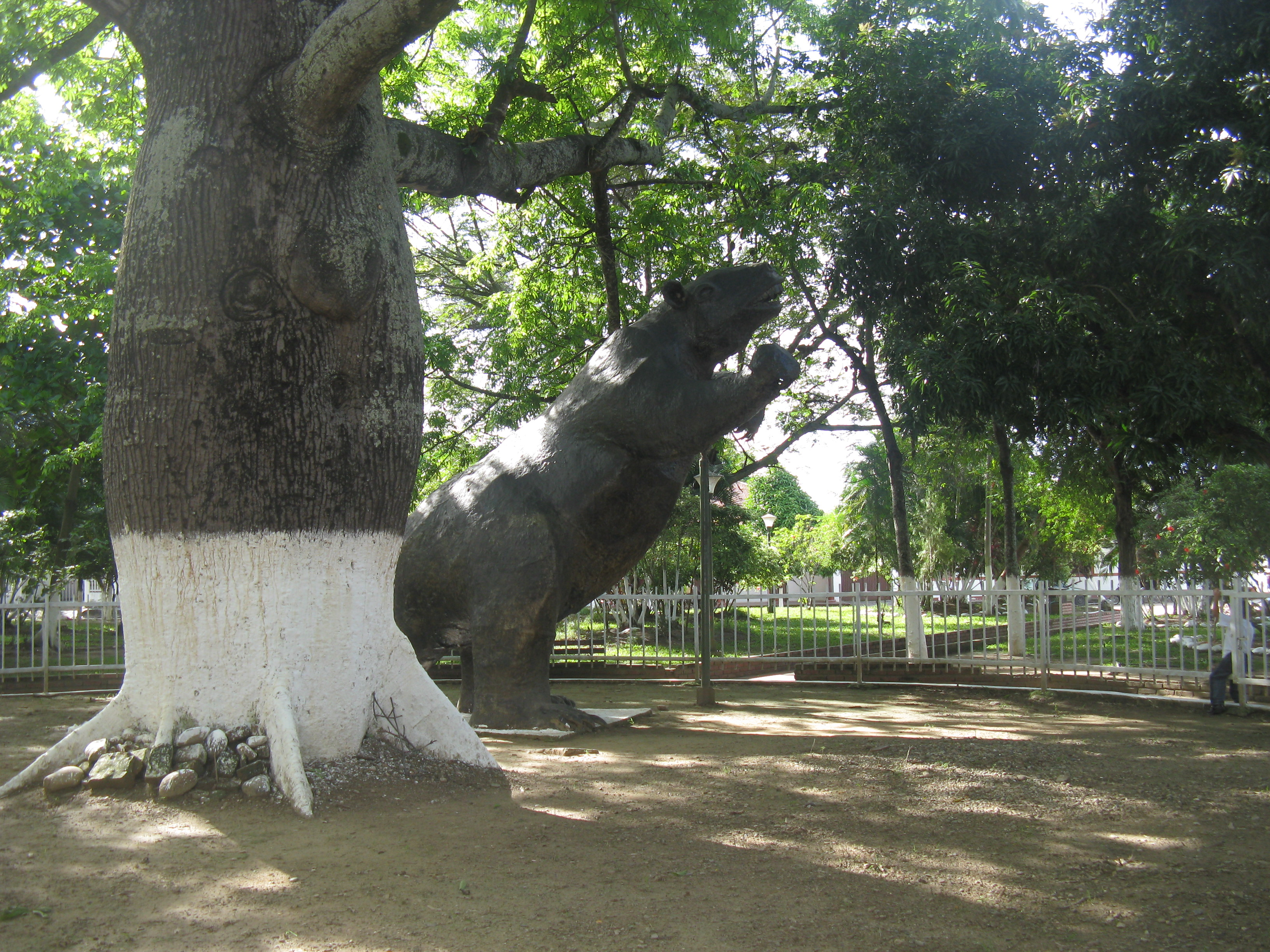
Model of Mammal found in Villa Viaja

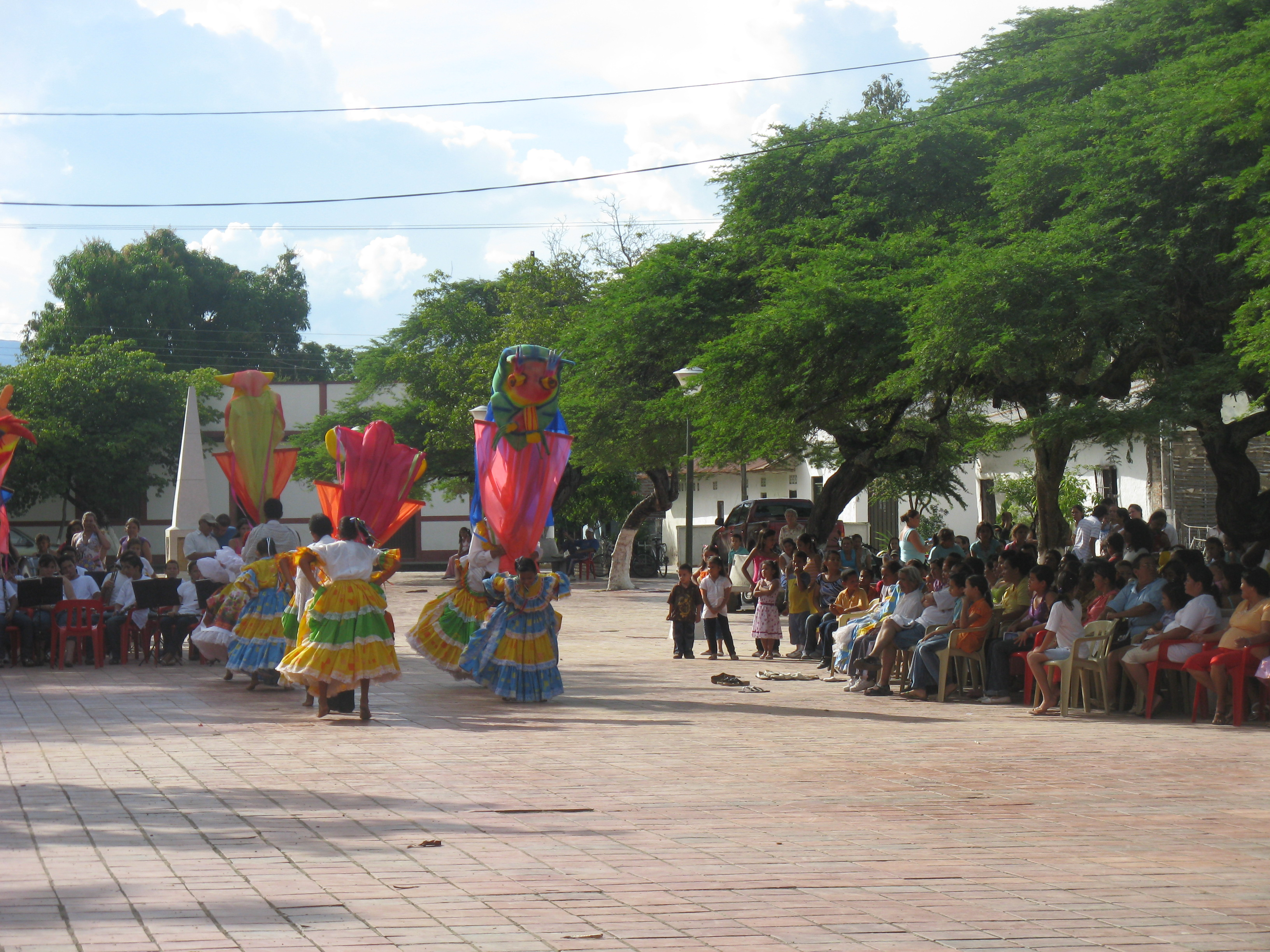
Traditional Dance

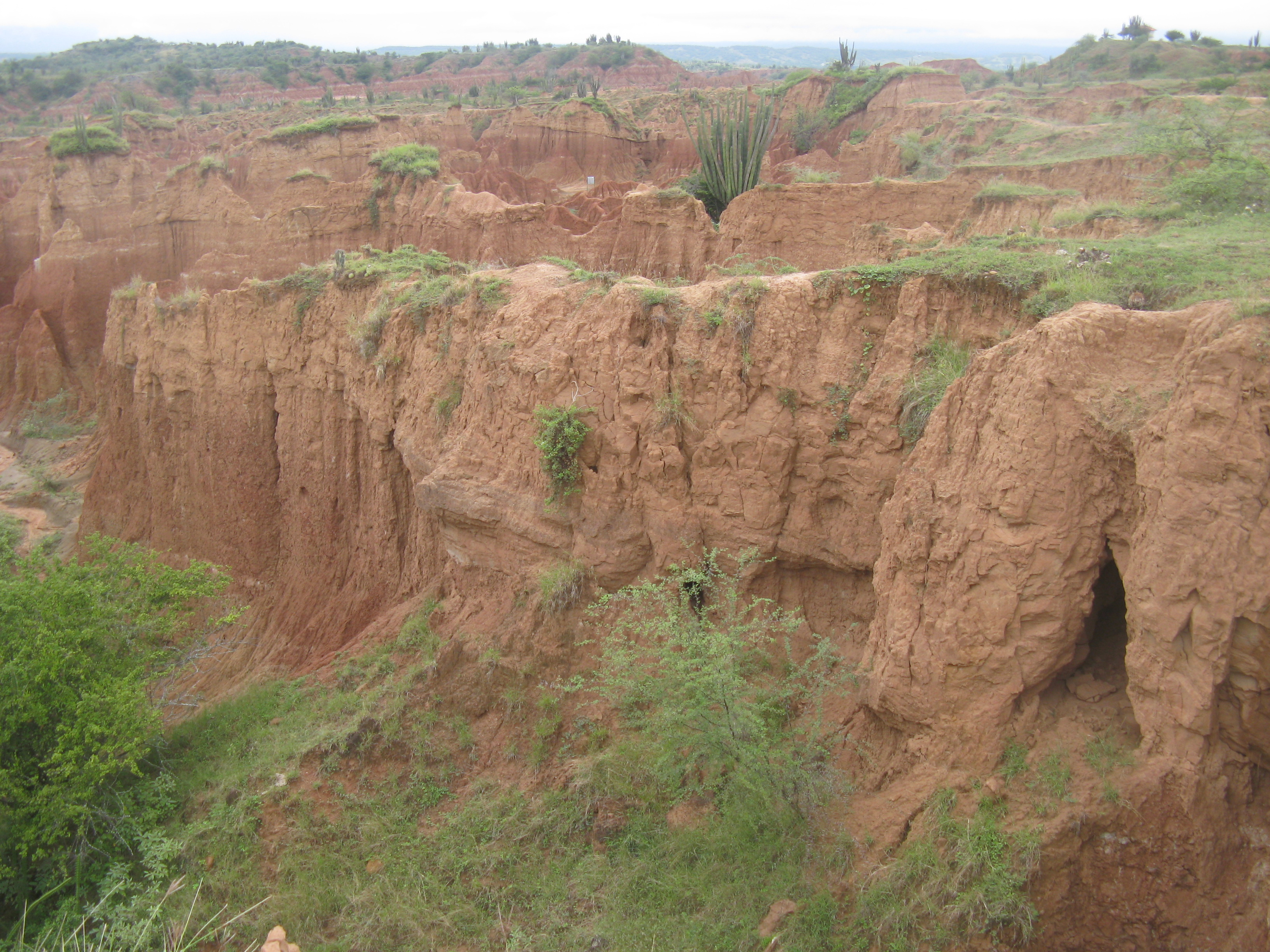
Tatacoa Desert

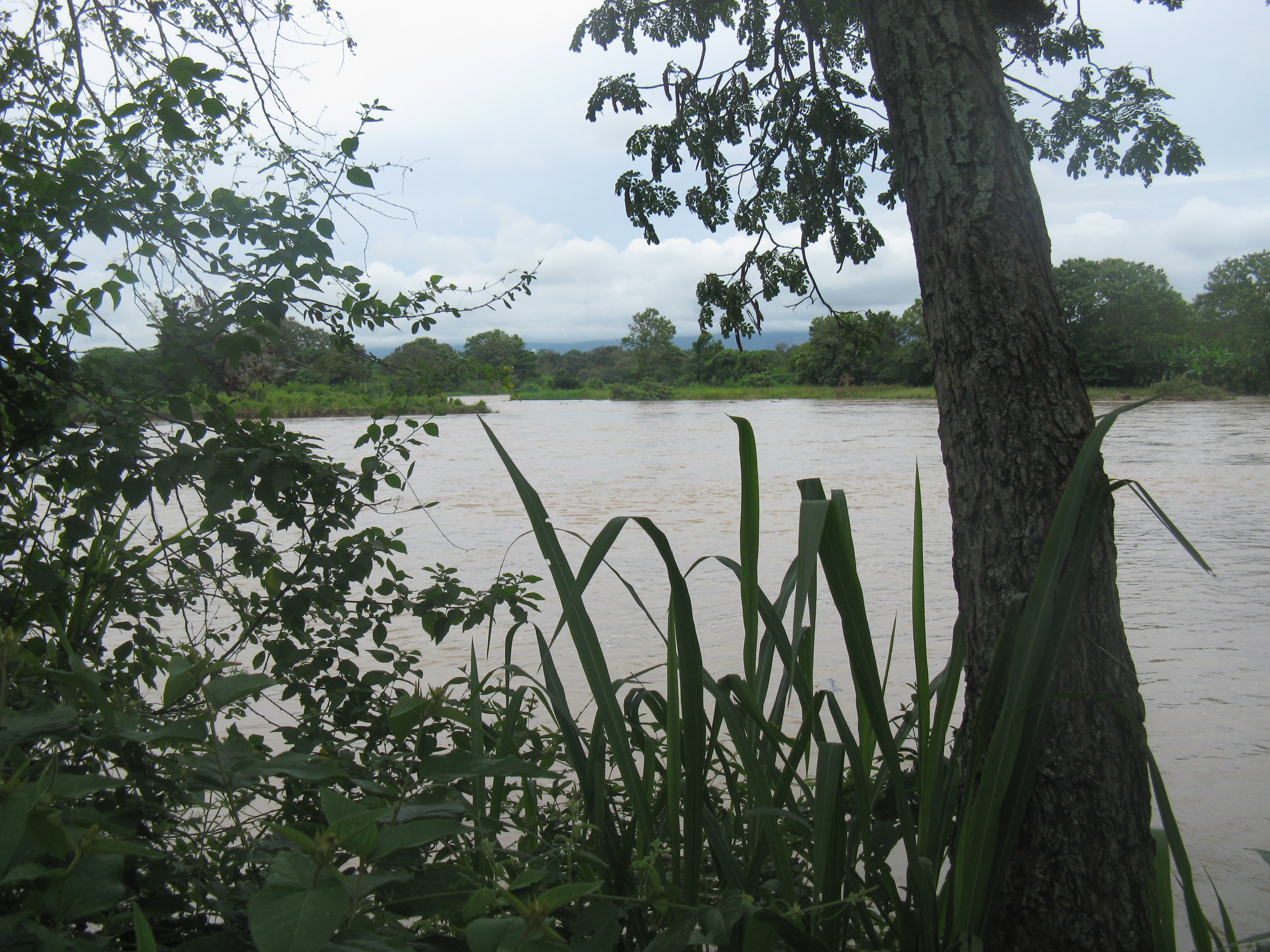
The Magdalena River

== Climate ==
Climate data for Villavieja (Villavieja Ffcc), elevation 430 m (1,410 ft), (1981–2010)
Month	Jan	Feb	Mar	Apr	May	Jun	Jul	Aug	Sep	Oct	Nov	Dec	Year
Mean daily maximum °C (°F)	34.0 (93.2)	34.3 (93.7)	33.6 (92.5)	33.2 (91.8)	33.4 (92.1)	34.2 (93.6)	34.7 (94.5)	35.6 (96.1)	35.7 (96.3)	34.0 (93.2)	32.4 (90.3)	32.7 (90.9)	34.0 (93.2)
Daily mean °C (°F)	27.8 (82.0)	28.0 (82.4)	27.7 (81.9)	27.5 (81.5)	27.5 (81.5)	27.8 (82.0)	28.0 (82.4)	28.7 (83.7)	28.8 (83.8)	27.6 (81.7)	26.9 (80.4)	27.2 (81.0)	27.8 (82.0)
Mean daily minimum °C (°F)	22.0 (71.6)	22.2 (72.0)	22.2 (72.0)	22.1 (71.8)	22.0 (71.6)	21.6 (70.9)	21.6 (70.9)	22.1 (71.8)	22.4 (72.3)	22.1 (71.8)	22.0 (71.6)	22.0 (71.6)	22.0 (71.6)
Average precipitation mm (inches)	67.0 (2.64)	88.0 (3.46)	128.8 (5.07)	131.2 (5.17)	95.2 (3.75)	29.4 (1.16)	29.8 (1.17)	20.2 (0.80)	66.7 (2.63)	158.9 (6.26)	183.6 (7.23)	129.8 (5.11)	1,128.5 (44.43)
Average precipitation days	8	9	12	14	13	10	9	7	9	15	15	12	131
Average relative humidity (%)	71	70	72	73	72	69	65	61	62	69	75	74	69
Source: Instituto de Hidrologia Meteorologia y Estudios Ambientales

Climate data for Villavieja (San Alfonso), elevation 440 m (1,440 ft), (1981–2010)
Month	Jan	Feb	Mar	Apr	May	Jun	Jul	Aug	Sep	Oct	Nov	Dec	Year
Mean daily maximum °C (°F)	33.6 (92.5)	34.1 (93.4)	33.8 (92.8)	33.5 (92.3)	33.9 (93.0)	35.0 (95.0)	35.4 (95.7)	36.4 (97.5)	36.2 (97.2)	34.1 (93.4)	32.5 (90.5)	32.6 (90.7)	34.3 (93.7)
Daily mean °C (°F)	28.4 (83.1)	27.9 (82.2)	28.6 (83.5)	27.9 (82.2)	28.2 (82.8)	28.7 (83.7)	29.2 (84.6)	30.1 (86.2)	29.8 (85.6)	28.3 (82.9)	27.3 (81.1)	27.5 (81.5)	28.5 (83.3)
Mean daily minimum °C (°F)	22.7 (72.9)	23.0 (73.4)	22.9 (73.2)	22.7 (72.9)	22.7 (72.9)	22.9 (73.2)	22.9 (73.2)	23.3 (73.9)	23.3 (73.9)	22.7 (72.9)	22.6 (72.7)	22.4 (72.3)	22.8 (73.0)
Average precipitation mm (inches)	58.1 (2.29)	73.7 (2.90)	137.1 (5.40)	127.1 (5.00)	80.7 (3.18)	29.0 (1.14)	27.7 (1.09)	19.2 (0.76)	58.7 (2.31)	167.3 (6.59)	177.3 (6.98)	125.3 (4.93)	1,081.2 (42.57)
Average precipitation days	7	10	12	14	13	10	9	7	9	14	16	12	132
Average relative humidity (%)	68	66	68	73	72	64	59	57	58	68	75	73	66
Mean monthly sunshine hours	158.1	135.5	127.1	138.0	155.0	150.0	164.3	167.4	153.0	148.8	135.0	133.3	1,765.5
Mean daily sunshine hours	5.1	4.8	4.1	4.6	5.0	5.0	5.3	5.4	5.1	4.8	4.5	4.3	4.8
Source: Instituto de Hidrologia Meteorologia y Estudios Ambientales

Climate data for Villavieja (San Jose), elevation 400 m (1,300 ft), (1981–2010)
Month	Jan	Feb	Mar	Apr	May	Jun	Jul	Aug	Sep	Oct	Nov	Dec	Year
Mean daily maximum °C (°F)	33.2 (91.8)	33.6 (92.5)	33.0 (91.4)	32.6 (90.7)	32.8 (91.0)	33.6 (92.5)	34.2 (93.6)	35.2 (95.4)	35.2 (95.4)	33.3 (91.9)	31.5 (88.7)	31.7 (89.1)	33.3 (91.9)
Daily mean °C (°F)	28.7 (83.7)	28.9 (84.0)	28.6 (83.5)	28.2 (82.8)	28.3 (82.9)	28.8 (83.8)	29.2 (84.6)	30.0 (86.0)	29.9 (85.8)	28.6 (83.5)	27.6 (81.7)	27.8 (82.0)	28.7 (83.7)
Mean daily minimum °C (°F)	23.3 (73.9)	23.4 (74.1)	23.4 (74.1)	23.2 (73.8)	23.2 (73.8)	23.2 (73.8)	23.1 (73.6)	23.6 (74.5)	23.7 (74.7)	23.3 (73.9)	23.1 (73.6)	23.1 (73.6)	23.3 (73.9)
Average precipitation mm (inches)	73.9 (2.91)	75.3 (2.96)	123.3 (4.85)	134.8 (5.31)	100.7 (3.96)	28.6 (1.13)	29.2 (1.15)	20.1 (0.79)	71.9 (2.83)	159.5 (6.28)	187.6 (7.39)	136.3 (5.37)	1,141.1 (44.93)
Average precipitation days	8	9	11	13	13	9	8	6	9	14	14	11	124
Average relative humidity (%)	68	67	68	70	70	66	61	58	59	67	72	72	66
Source: Instituto de Hidrologia Meteorologia y Estudios Ambientales
