= Culture of Thailand =

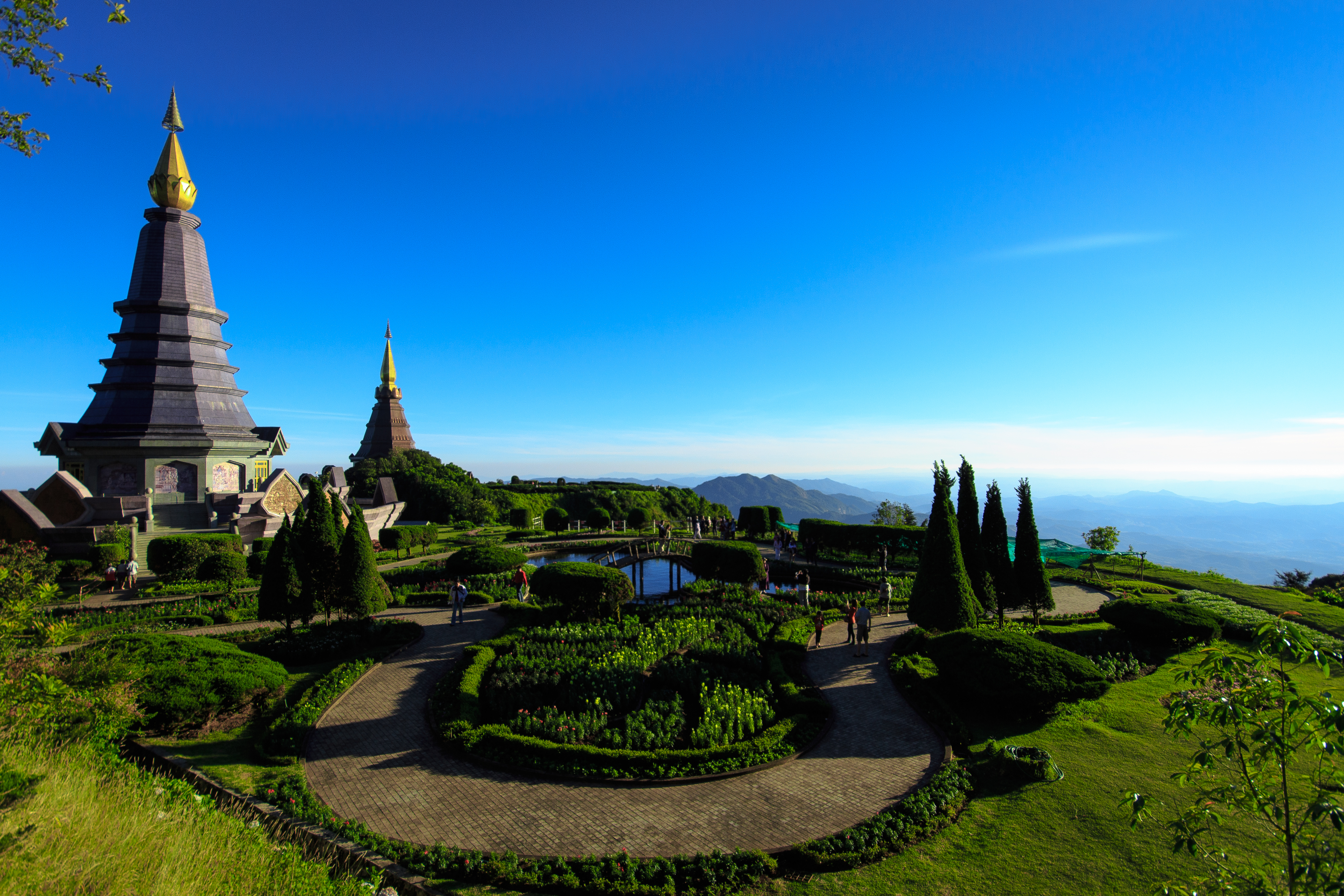
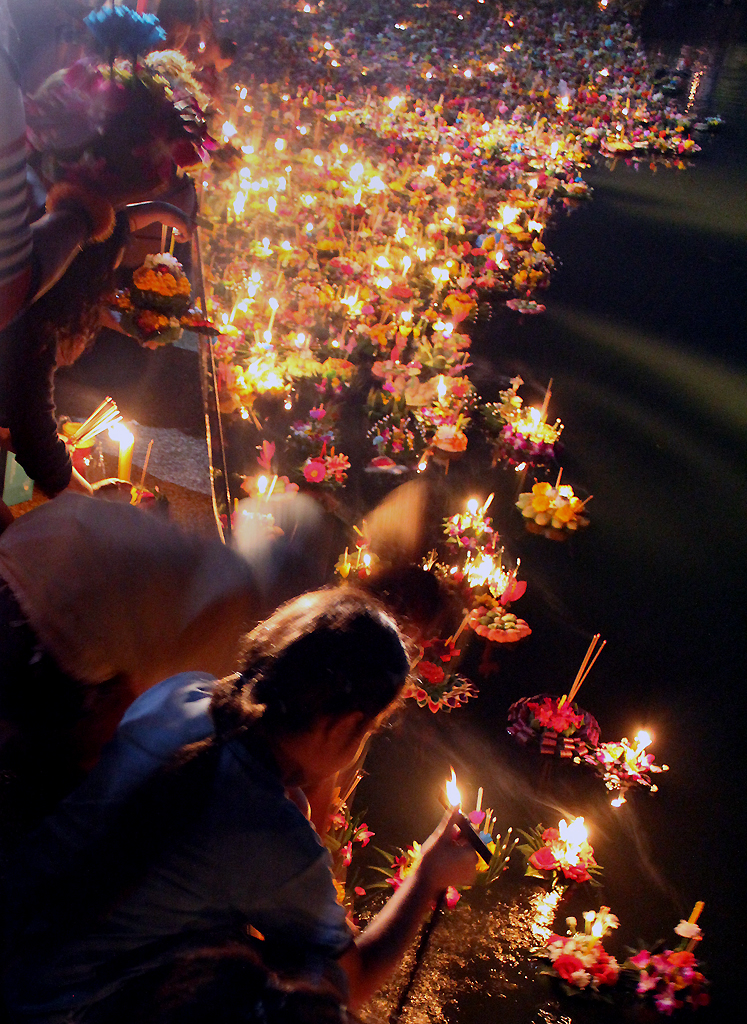
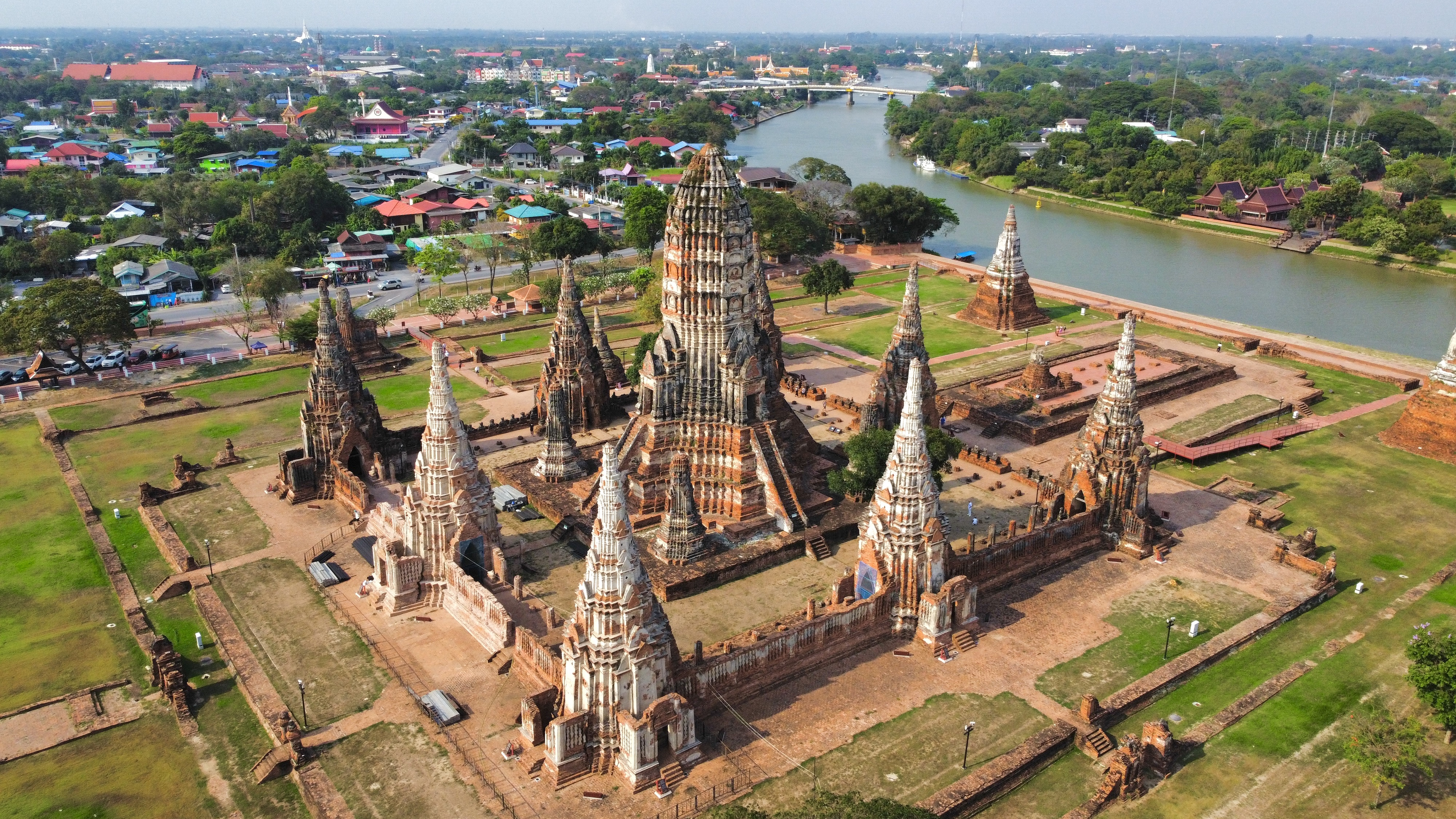
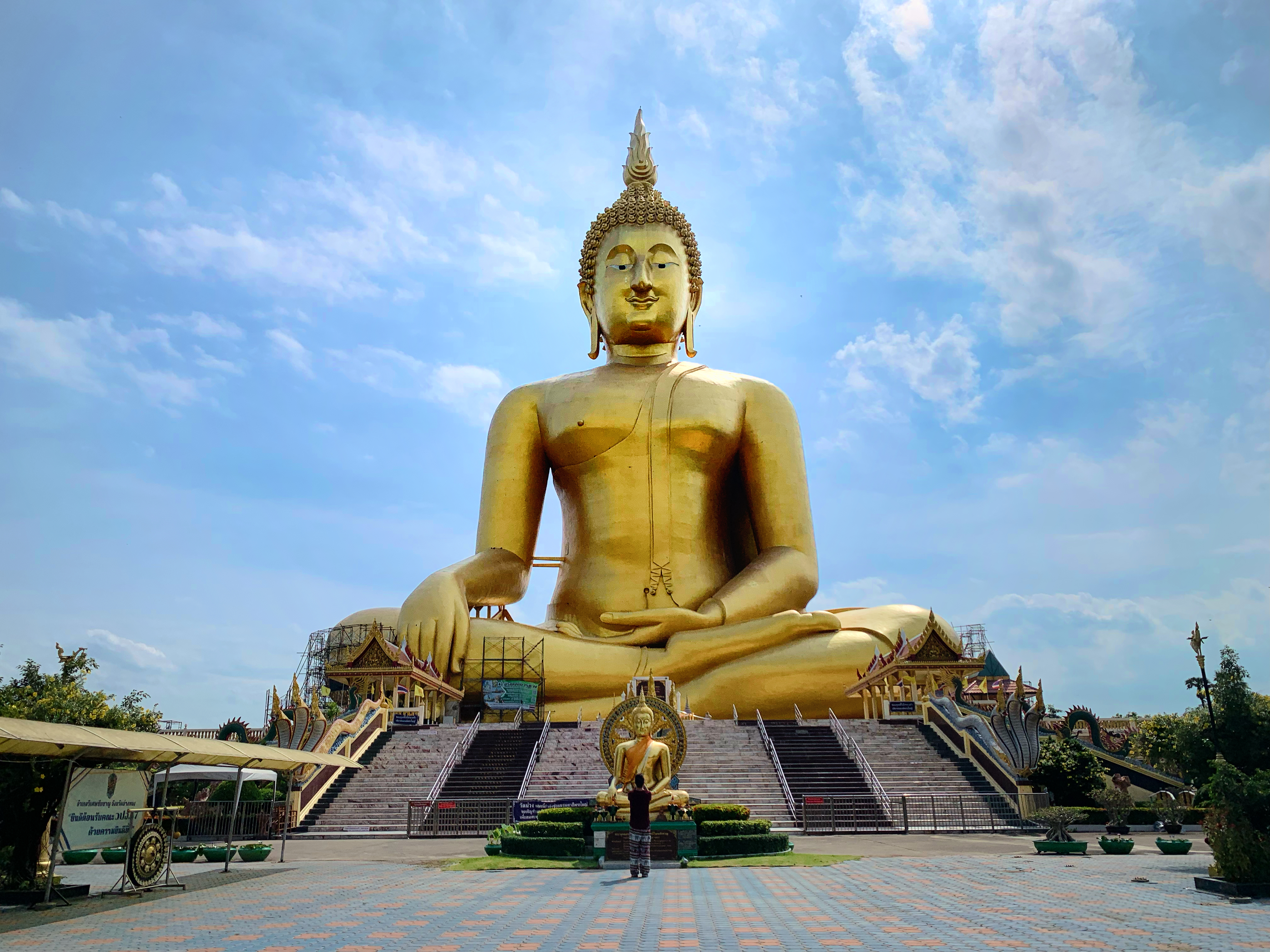
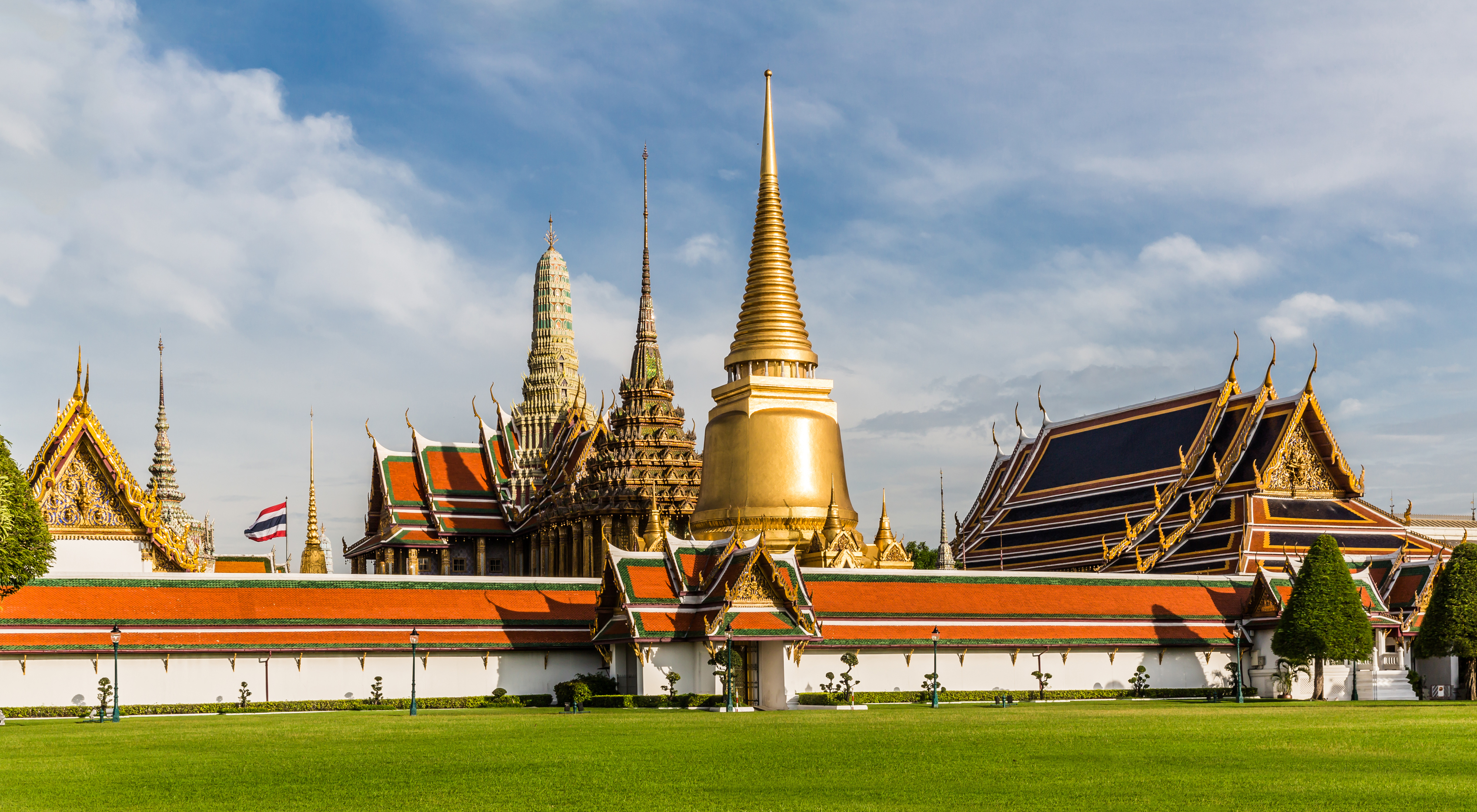
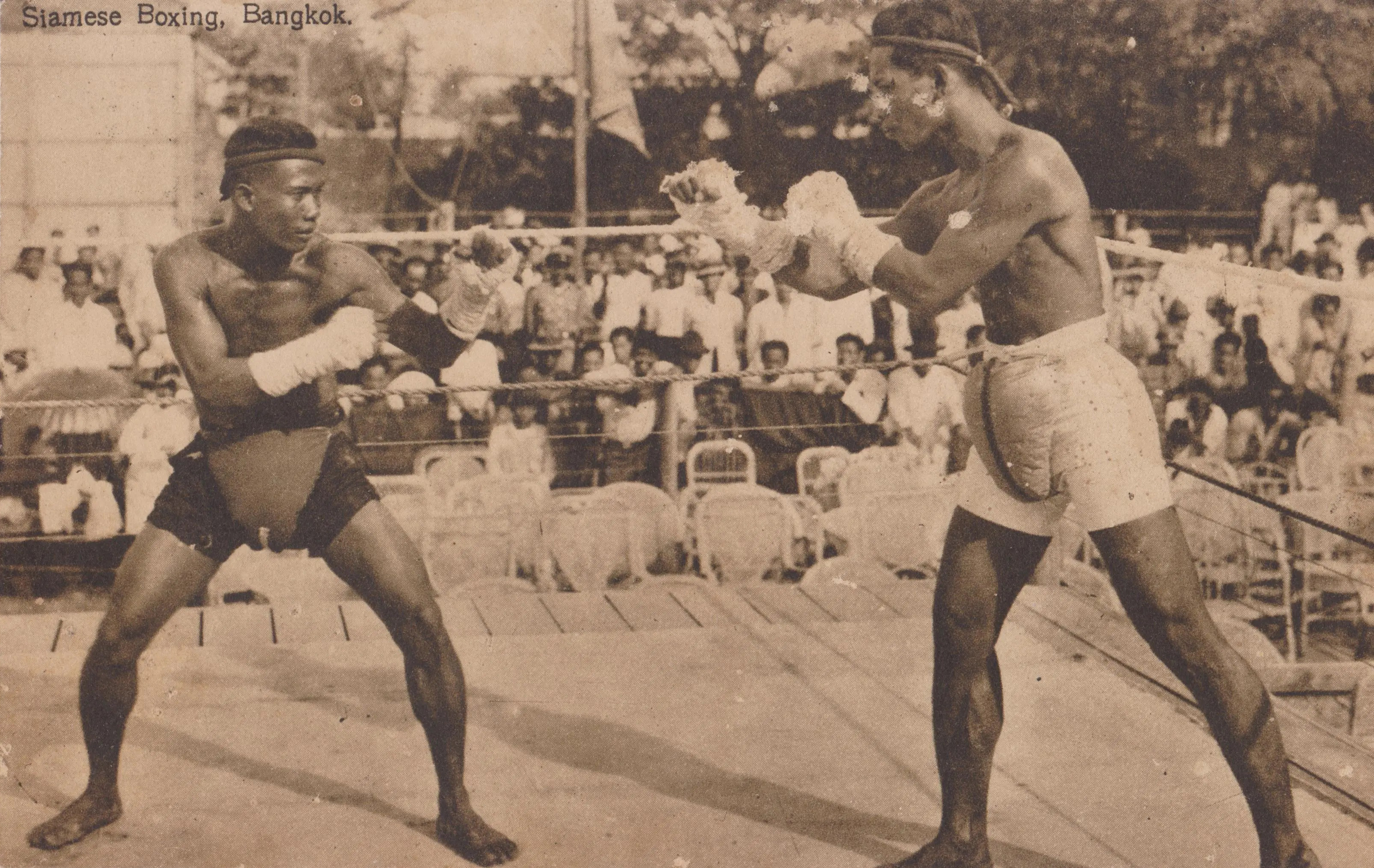
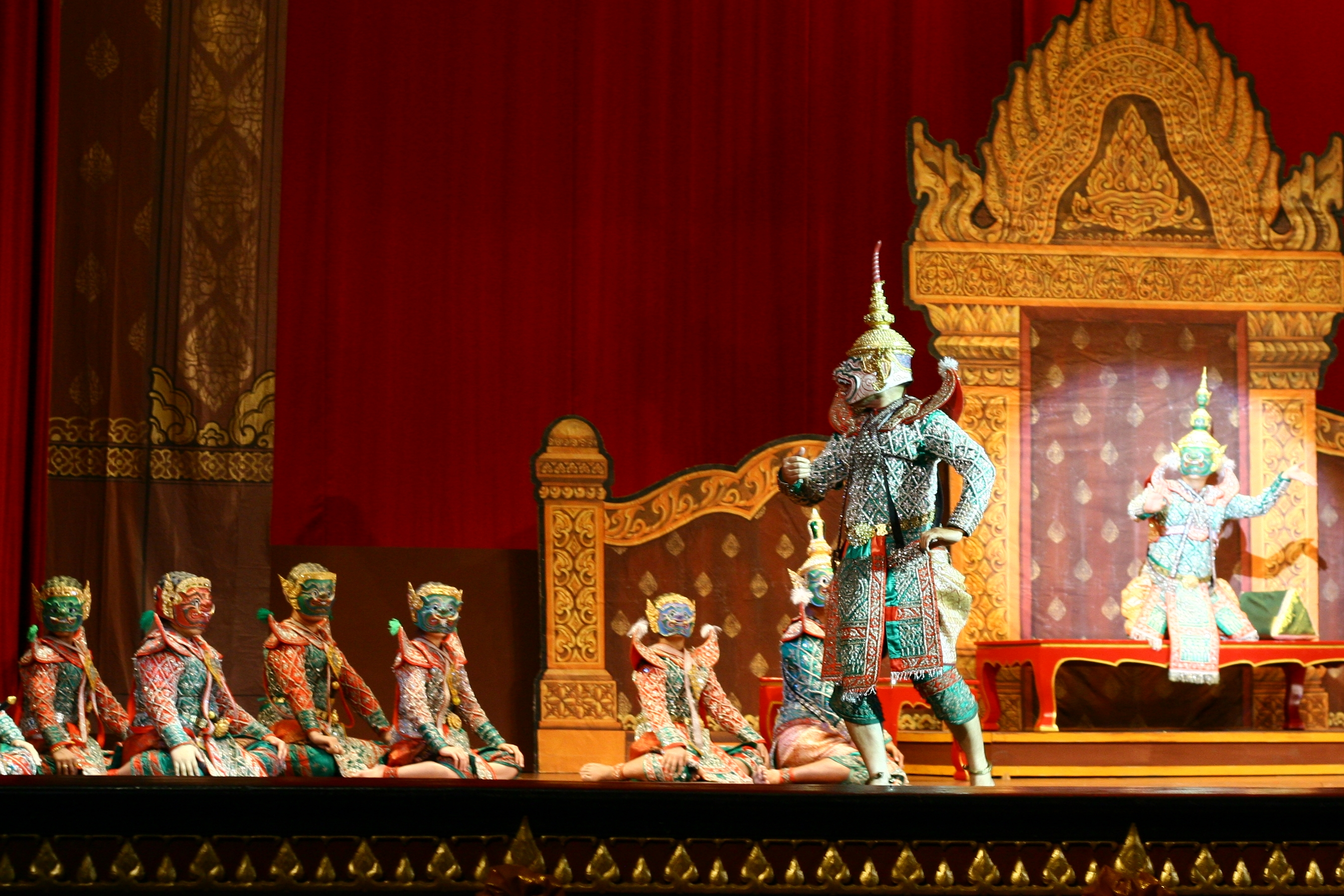
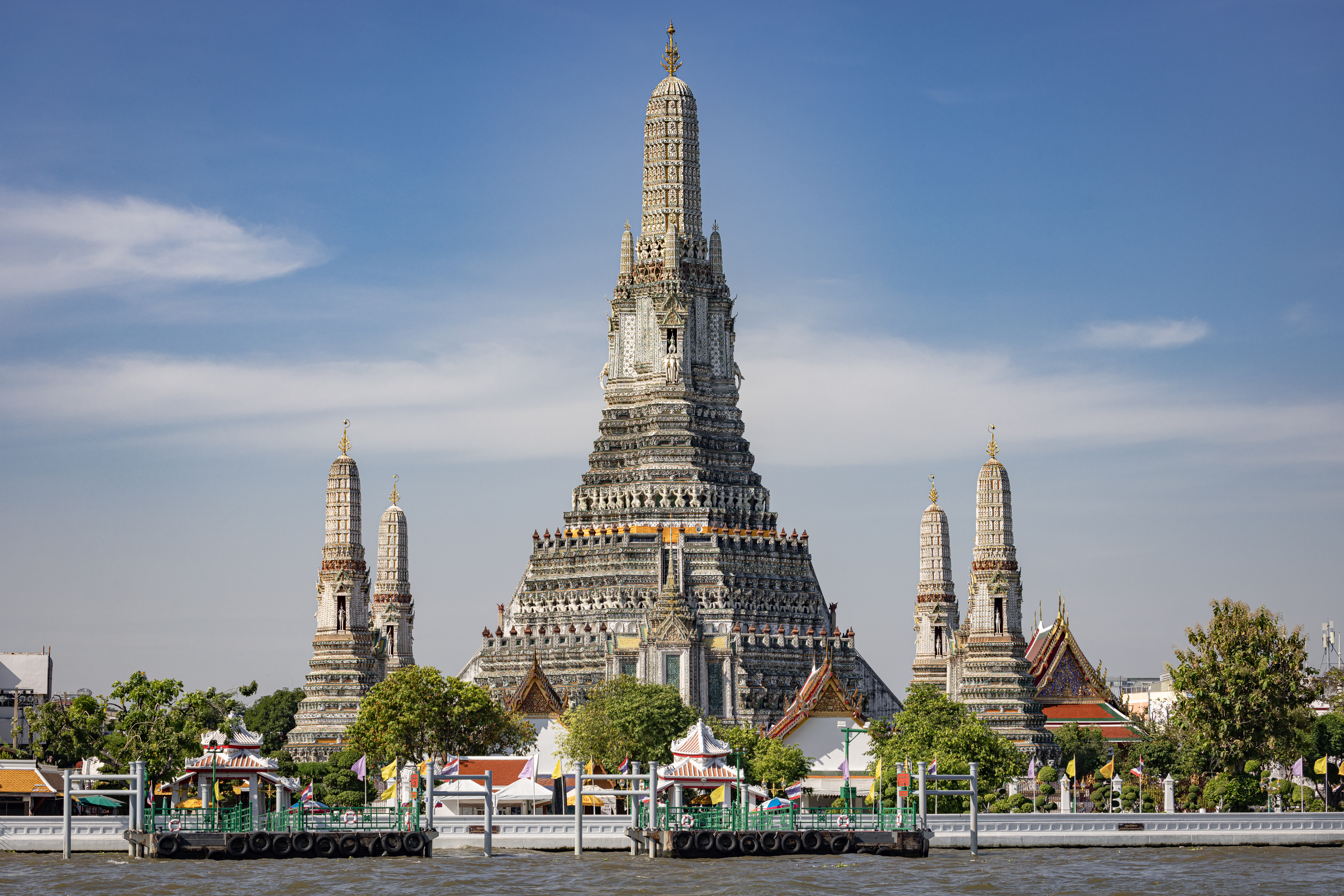
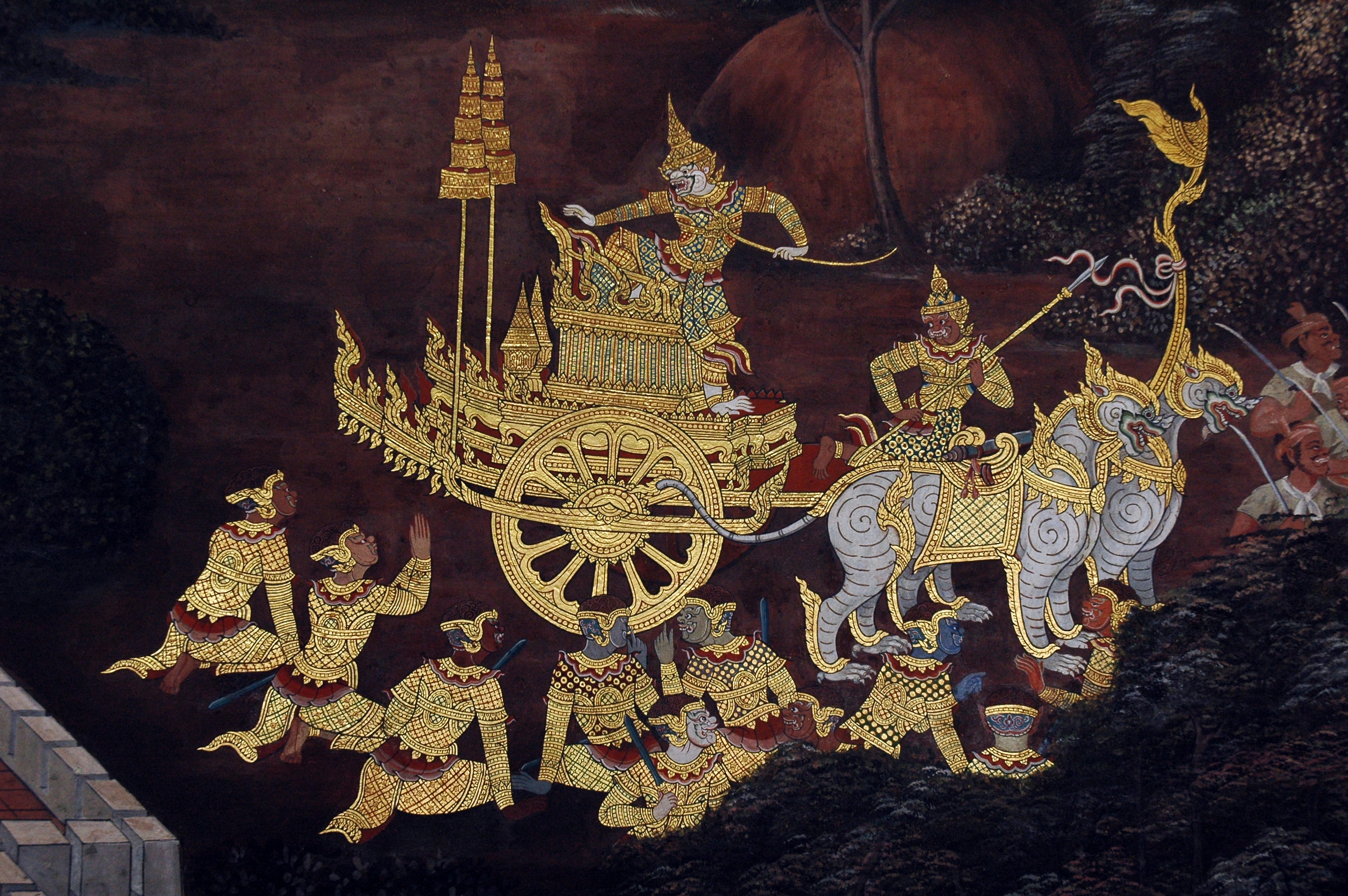
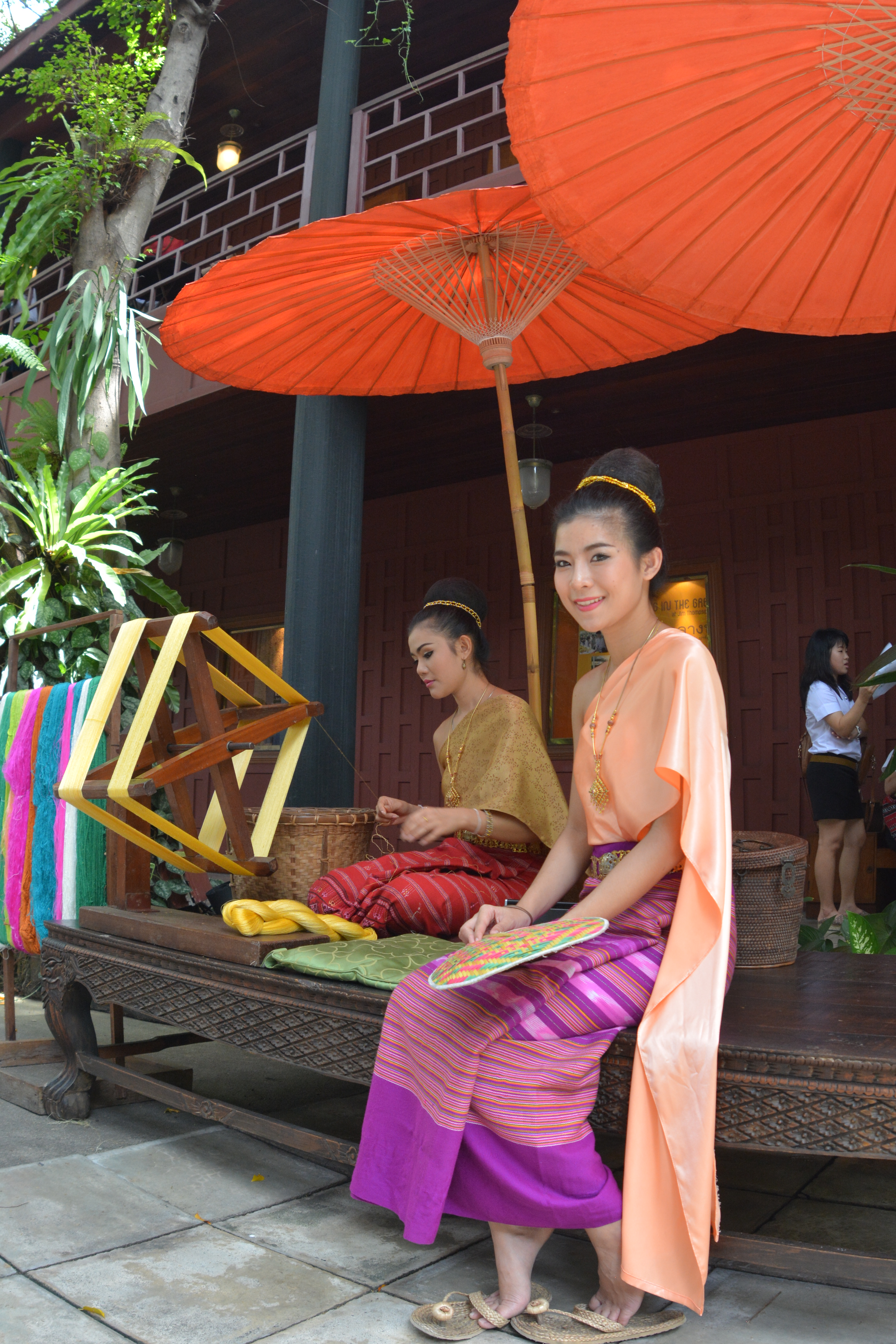
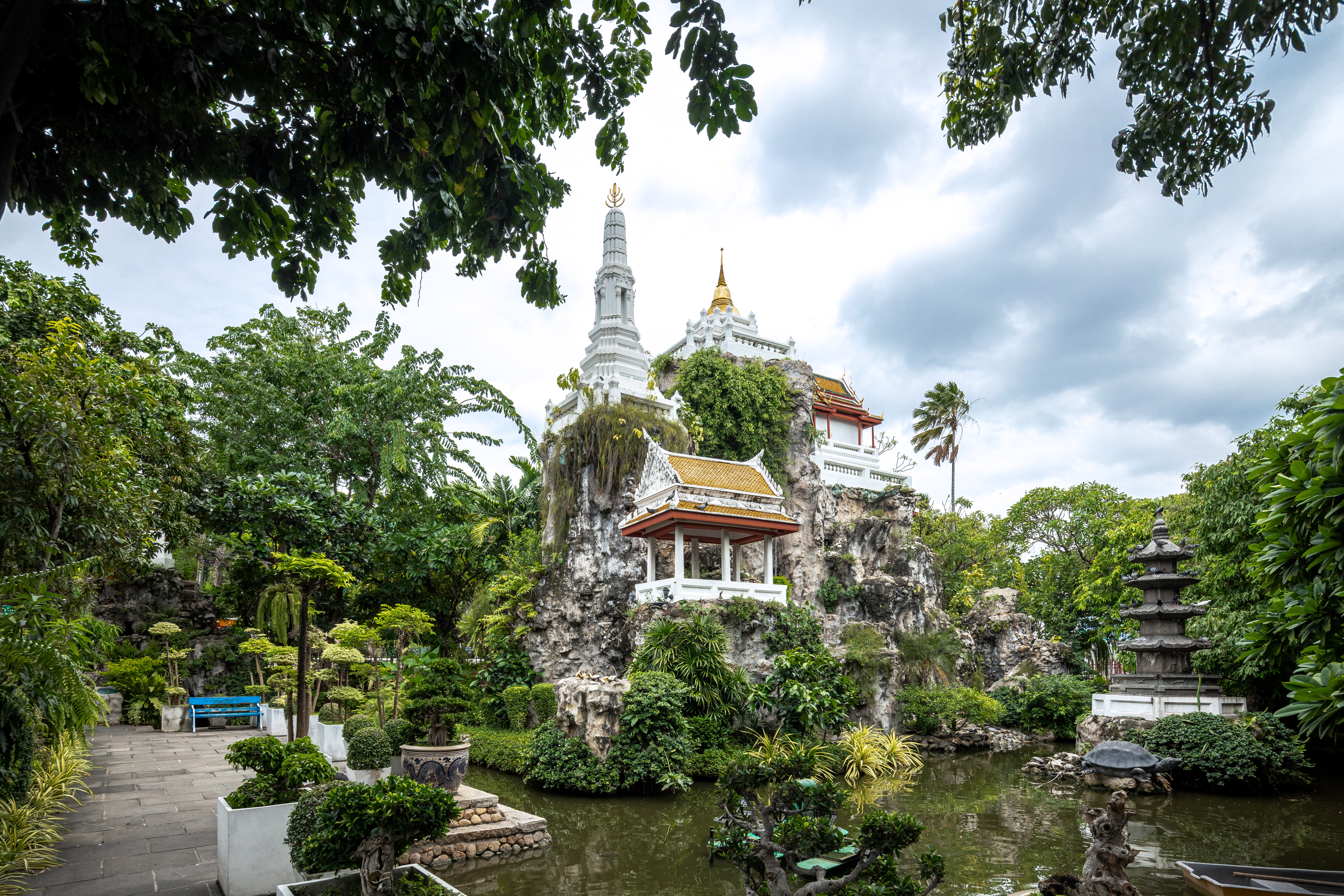
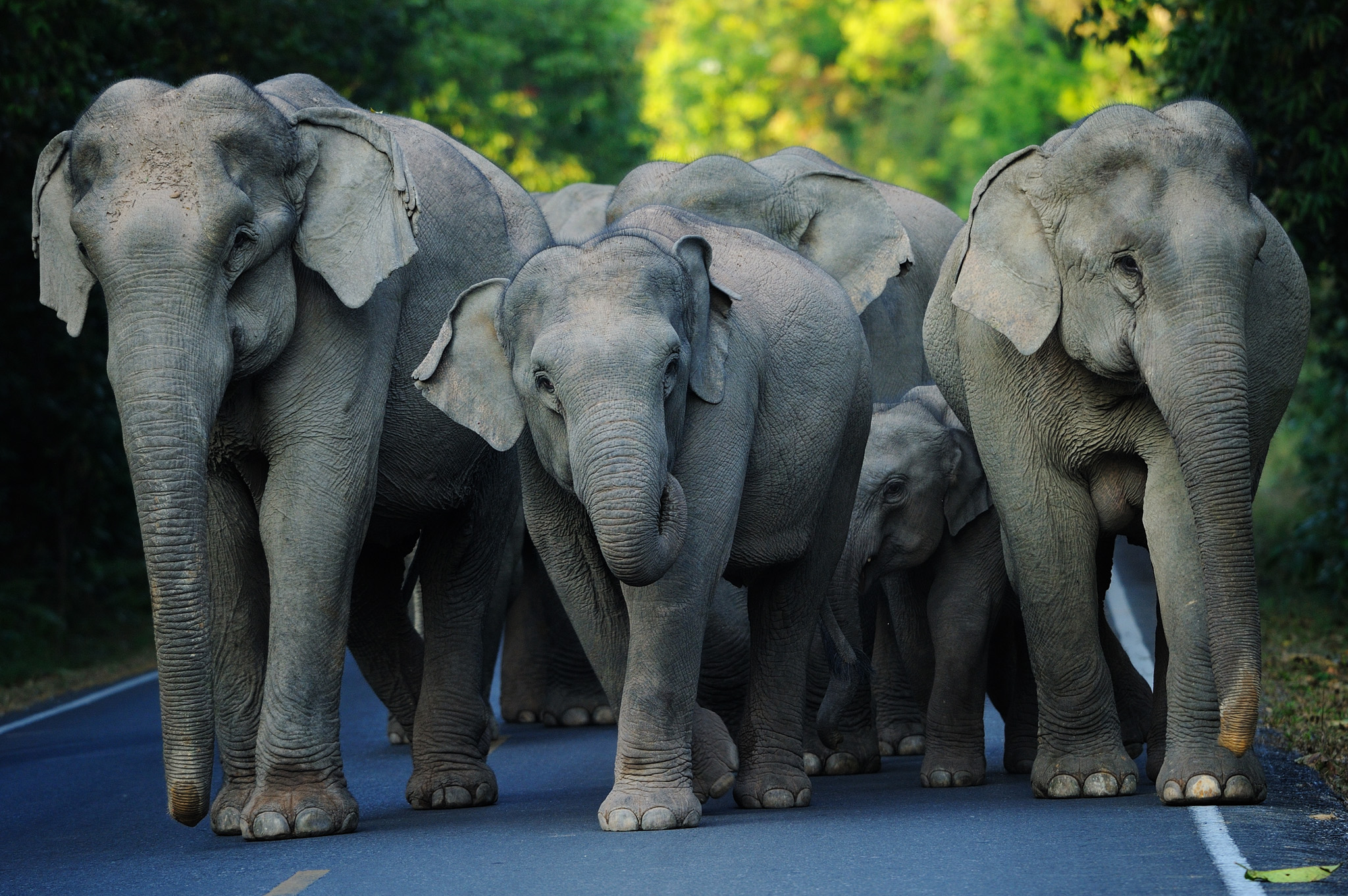
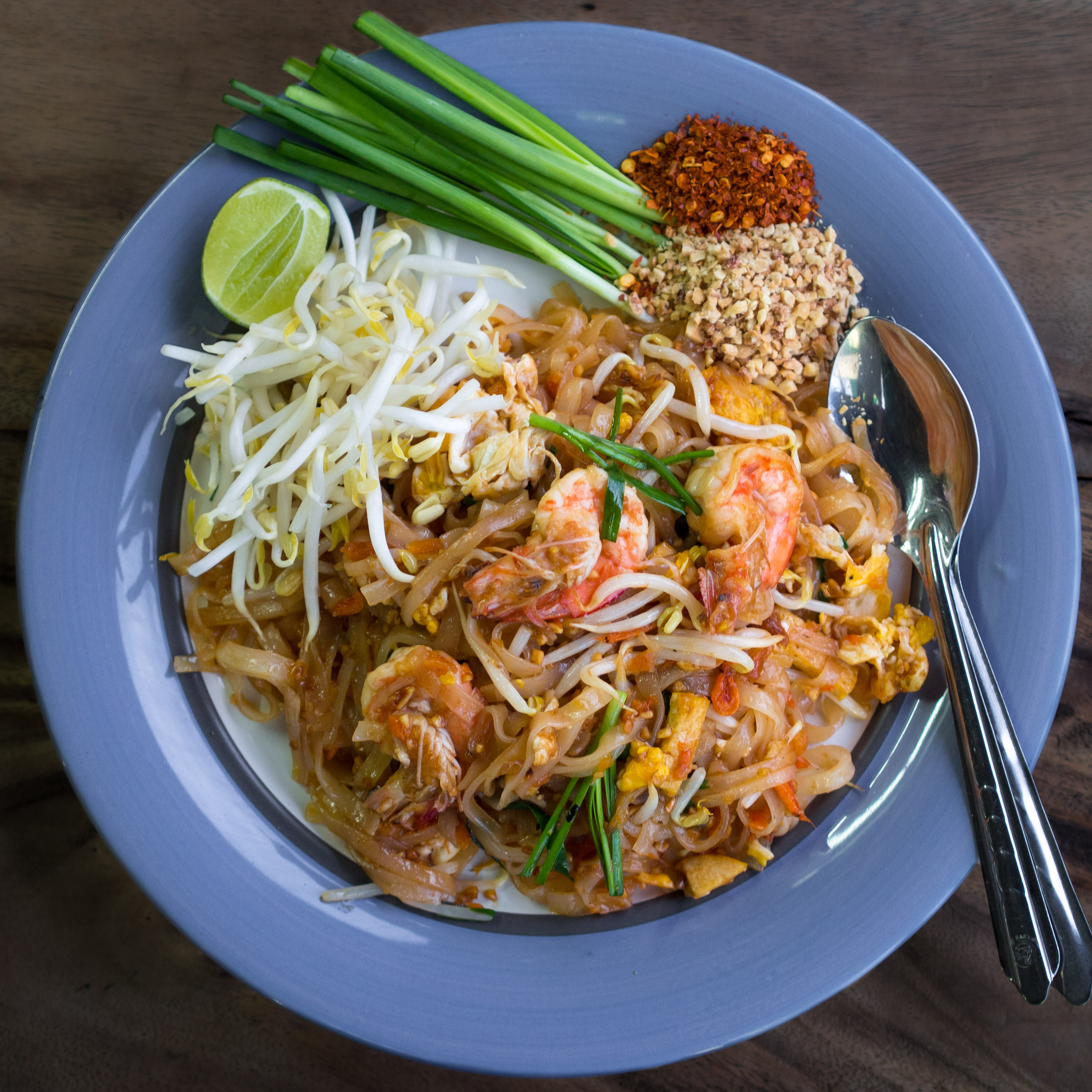
Representative elements of Thai culture
From top, left to right: Doi Inthanon, Loy Krathong, Wat Chaiwatthanaram, Great Buddha of Thailand, Wat Phra Kaew, Muay Thai, Khon, Wat Arun, Ramakien, Traditional Thai clothing, Khao mor, Elephants in Khao Yai National Park, Pad Thai

The culture of Thailand has evolved over time. Local customs, animist beliefs, Hindu, Buddhist traditions, and regional ethnic and cultural practices have all played a role in shaping Thai culture. Thainess, which refers to the distinctive qualities that define the national identity of Thailand, is evident in the country's history, customs, and traditions. While Buddhism remains the dominant religion in Thailand with more than 40,000 temples, Islam, Christianity, and other faiths are also practiced.

Thailand's historical and cultural heritage has been shaped by interactions with neighboring cultures as well as far-reaching cultures such as Indian, Chinese, Japanese, Khmer, Portuguese, and Persian, with the ancient city of Ayutthaya serving as a global trade center. Early European visitors also recognized Ayutthaya as one of the great powers of Asia, alongside China and India, highlighting the city's importance and influence in the region. In modern times, Thailand's cultural landscape has been shaped by the influence of global trends. This includes the adoption of modern educational practices and the promotion of science and technology, while also preserving traditional customs and practices.

Thailand's cultural influence extends beyond its borders, shaping neighboring countries' television programming, dance, films, art, fashion, music, and cuisine. The country's 5F cultural policy, which promotes food, films, fashion, fighting, and festivals, is aimed at becoming an important cultural export to drive economic development and generate income for the countries. Thai cuisine has become an integral part of restaurant menus worldwide, while Muay Thai, a traditional Thai martial art, has gained global popularity as a combat sport. Traditional festivals such as Songkran and Loy Krathong have also attracted tourists from around the world.

== Visual arts ==
=== Ceramics ===
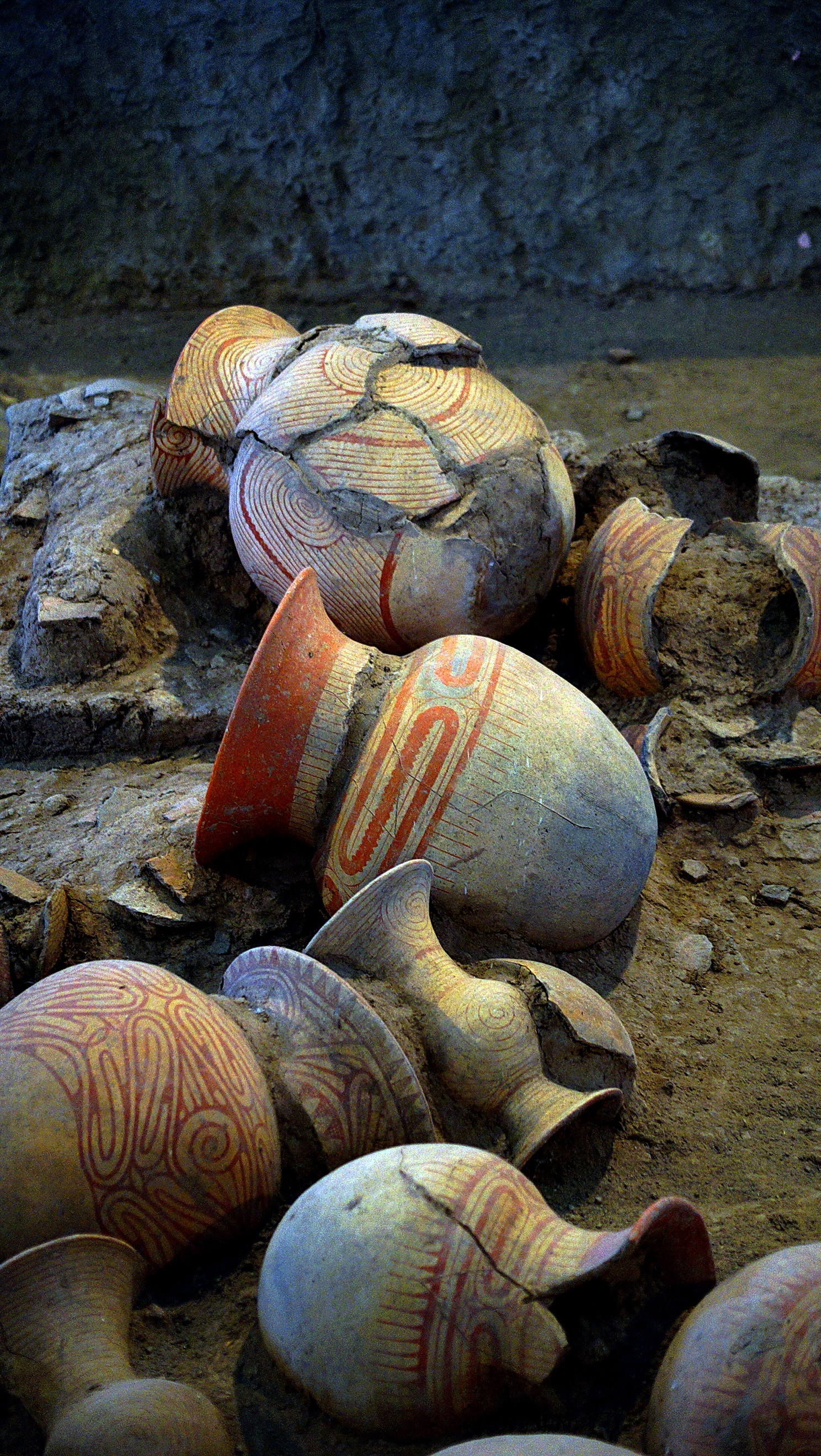
Painted pottery bowls from the Ban Chiang archaeological site.

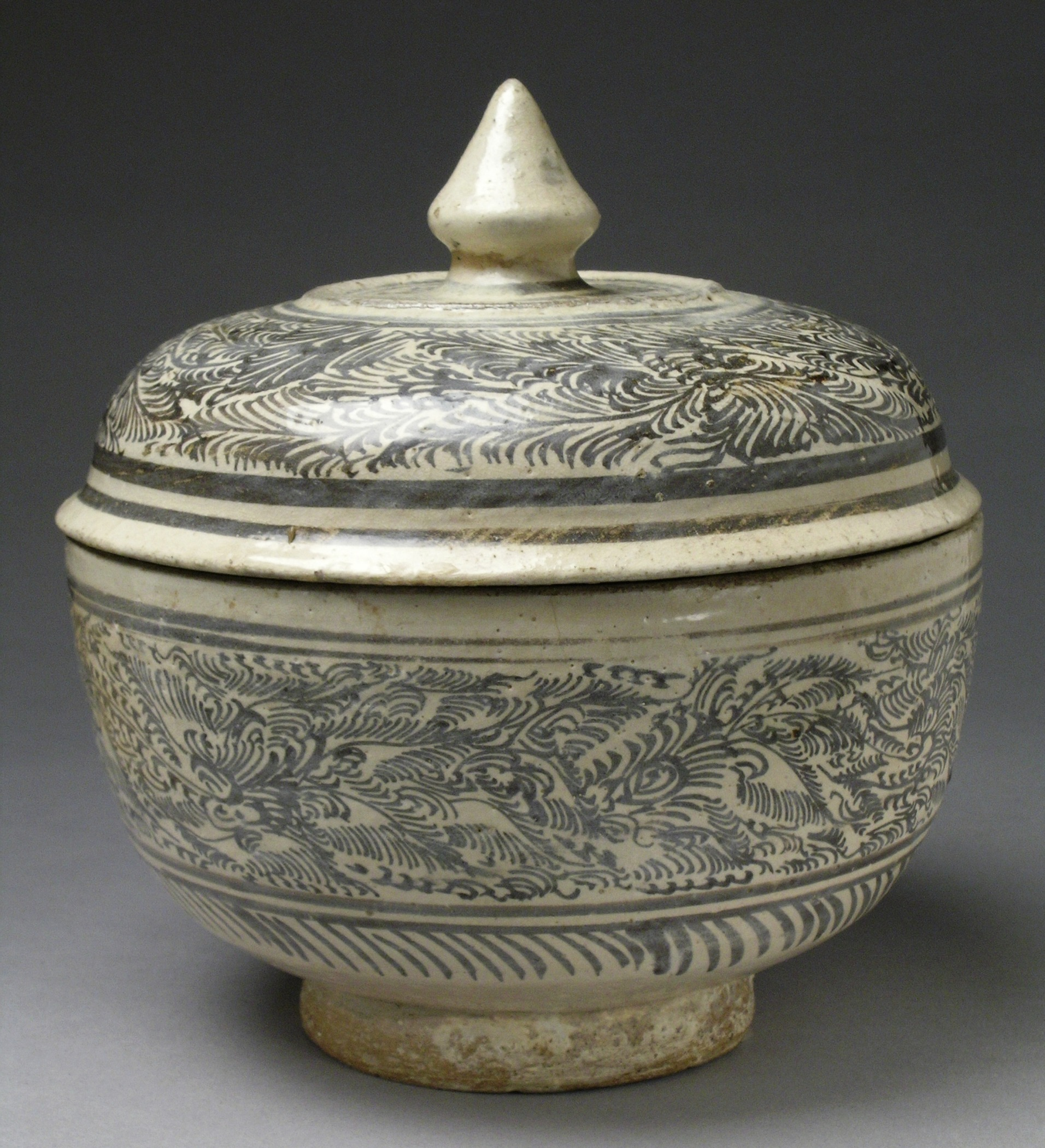
15th-16th century Sawankhalok stoneware with brown underglaze and pale blue glaze

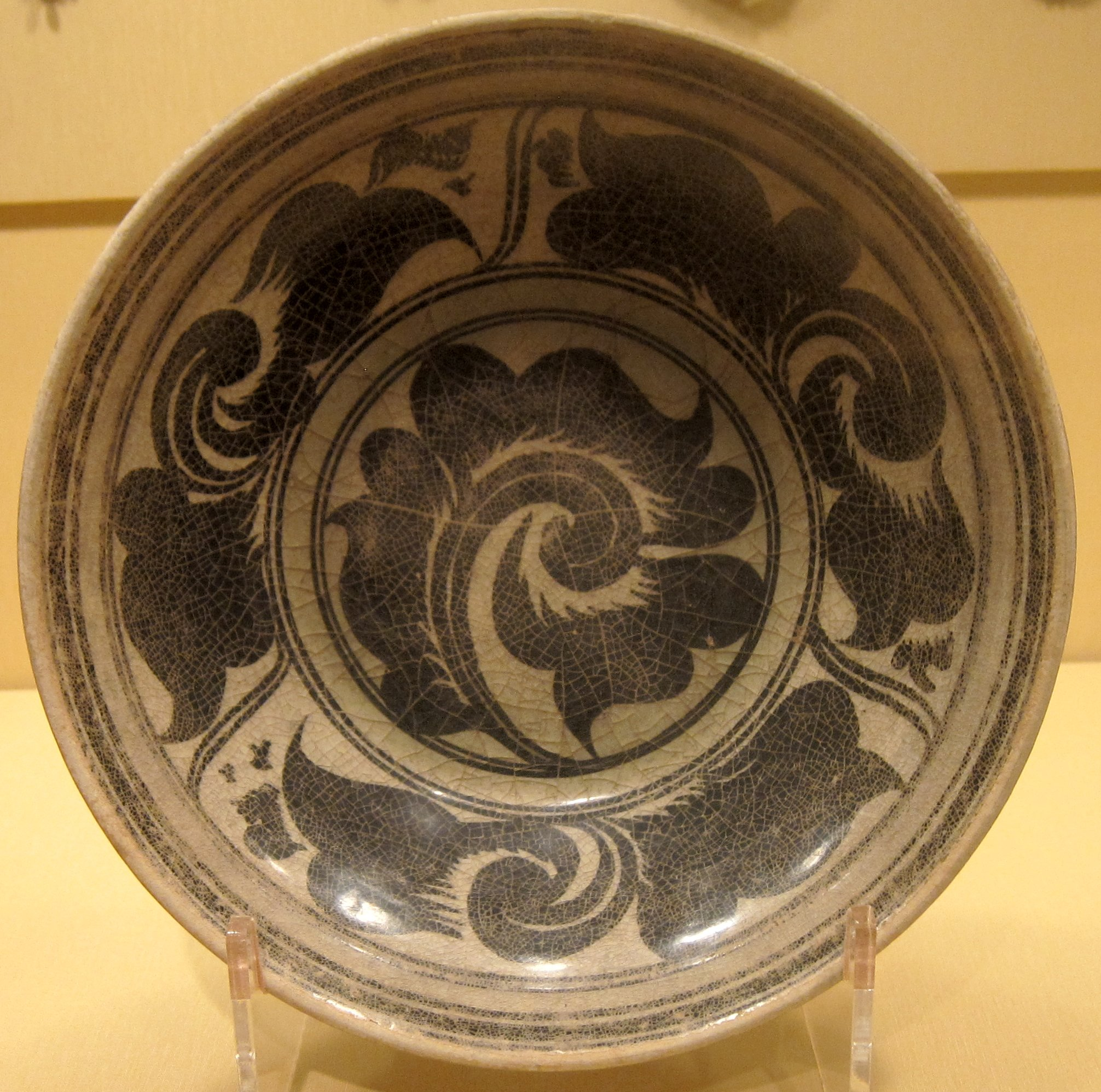
15th-century Kalong ware glazed stoneware dish

Ceramic production in Thailand has been traced back to prehistoric times. Ban Chiang archaeological site in northeast Thailand is one of the most important prehistoric settlements in Southeast Asia and a World Heritage Site since 1992. The site provides insights into earliest metallurgical civilizations, especially those that used bronze and iron, as well as valuable evidence of early pottery, among which the red-on-buff painted pottery is the most well-known. The site also offers evidence of early agriculture, with domesticated rice and elaborate burial offerings.

The Sukhothai Kingdom, which emerged from the mid-1200s, marked another significant period for ceramic production in Thailand. The two major centers for ceramic production were Si Satchanalai and Sukhothai. Ayutthaya Kingdom rose up as a major trading hub located on a navigable river that became the primary route for shipping Sawankhalok and Sukhothai ceramics abroad. Other areas of Thailand, including Suphanburi, San Kamphaeng, Singburi, and Kalong, also produced ceramics, but they were mainly used within their respective regions and not exported to the same extent as Sawankhalok and Sukhothai ceramics. According to archaeological evidence from various sites, Thai ceramics were generally considered the second most popular type of ceramics after Chinese ceramics.

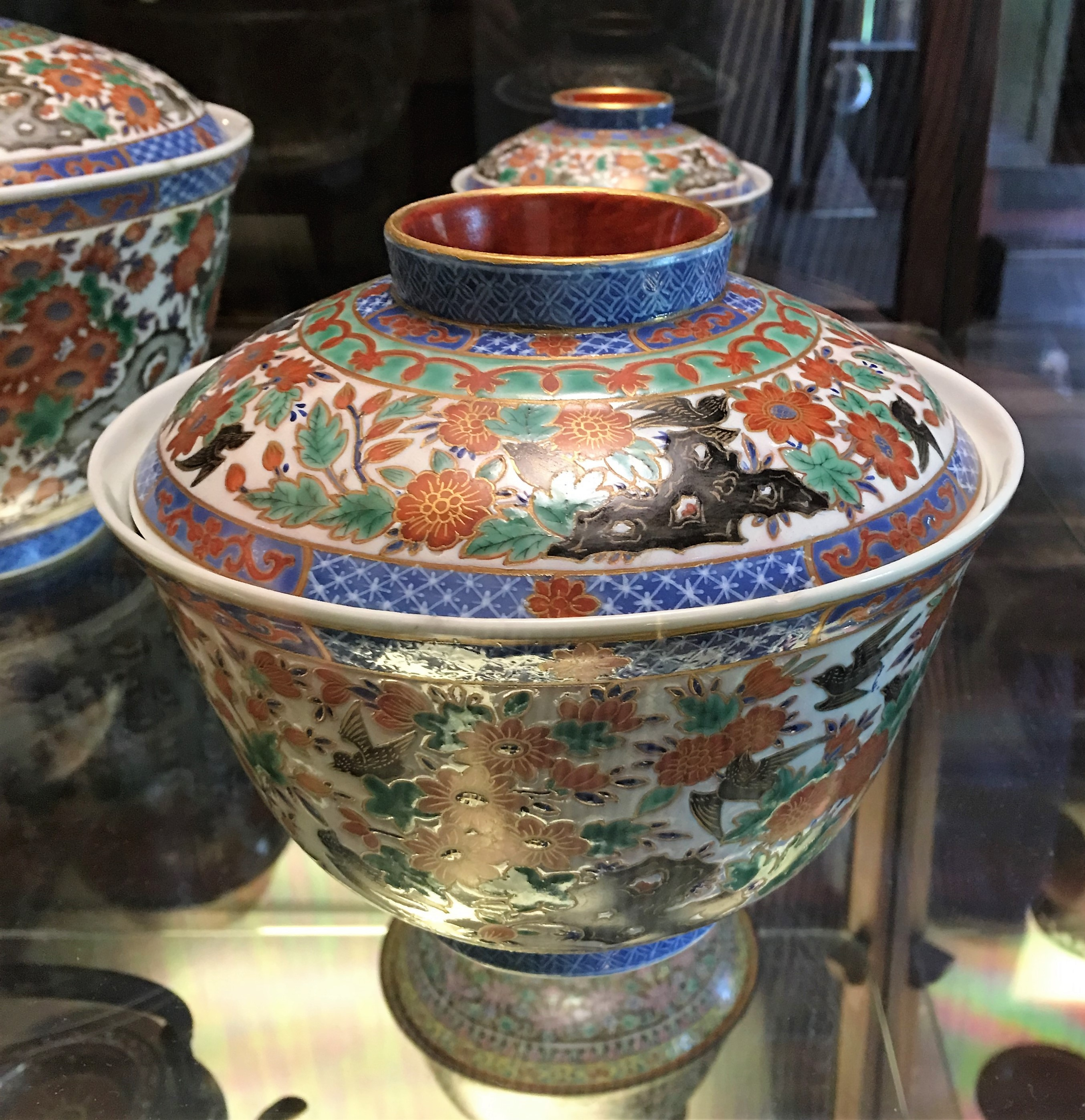
17th-19th century Benjarong style ceramics from Ayutthaya.

During the Ayutthaya period and beyond, Thai ceramic continued to develop and evolve. One type of porcelain that became especially prominent was Benjarong, originally produced in China with Thai-inspired designs. This intricately designed porcelain features five major colors, including black, red, white, yellow, and green. Over time, Thai artisans began producing Benjarong themselves, and it continued to be produced in Krung Thonburi and Rattanakosin, with a specific style called Lai nam thong incorporating gold leaf decoration that was mainly used by the aristocracy. Today, Thai ceramics continue to reflect the unique culture and way of life of Thailand, with more than 30 new colors and design styles that are unique to Thai ceramics.

=== Painting ===
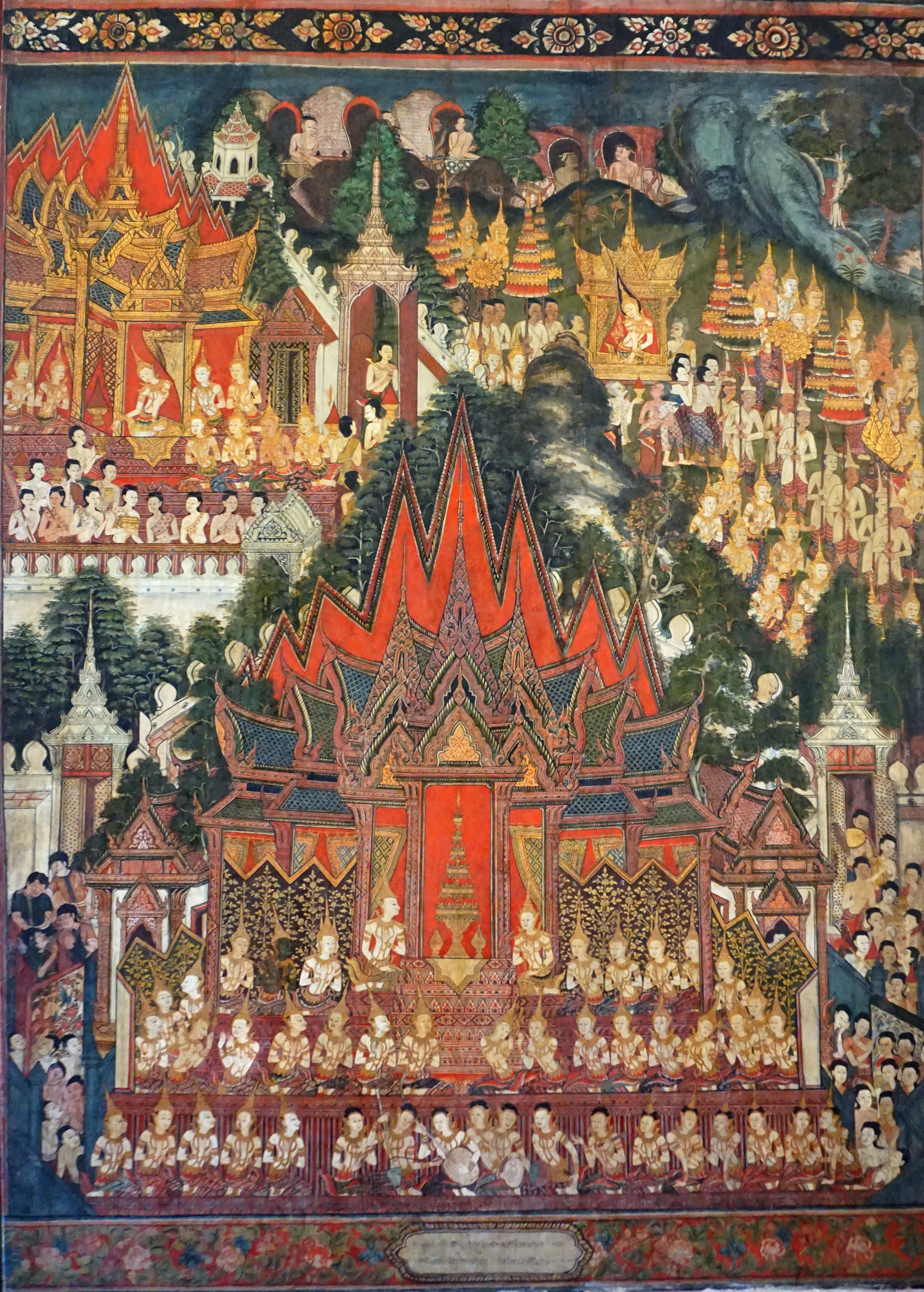
Mural painting at Phra Thi Nang Phutthaisawan dates back to the early Rattanakosin period.

Prehistoric painting can be observed in the form of cave paintings, a type of rock art found in caves. Rock art is categorized into two periods: prehistoric and historic. It is often reported that rock art sites date back to around 3,000-5,000 years ago, although many of these sites remain undated. The majority of rock art sites are regarded to be prehistoric, and they can be found throughout the country. Rock art is typically located in rock shelters and on cliff faces, with only a few instances found in deep caves. Thailand has the highest number of known and documented rock art sites in mainland Southeast Asia, with over 250 sites cataloged.

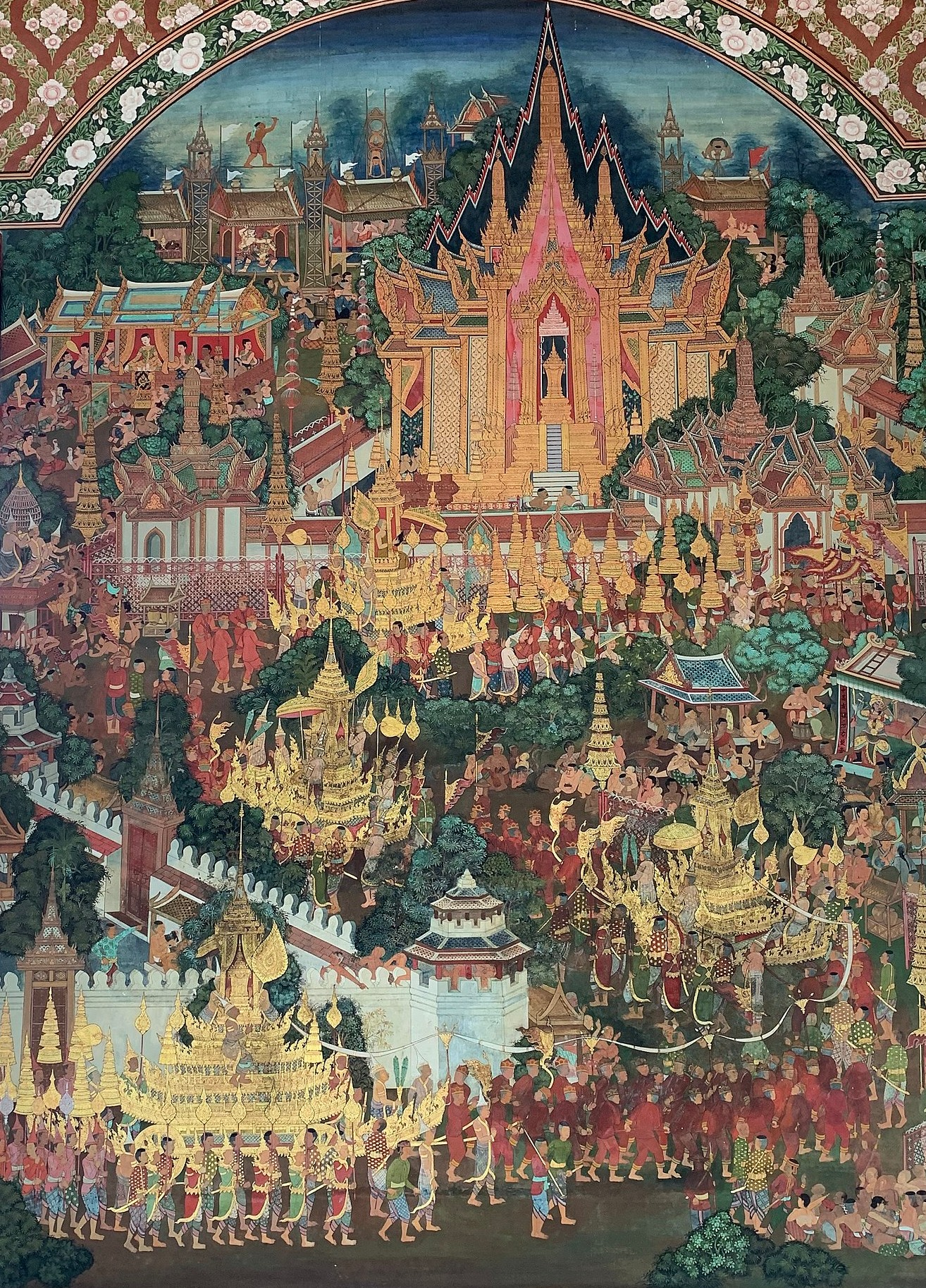
Mural painting in Wat Amphawan Chetiyaram showing the royal cremation ceremony

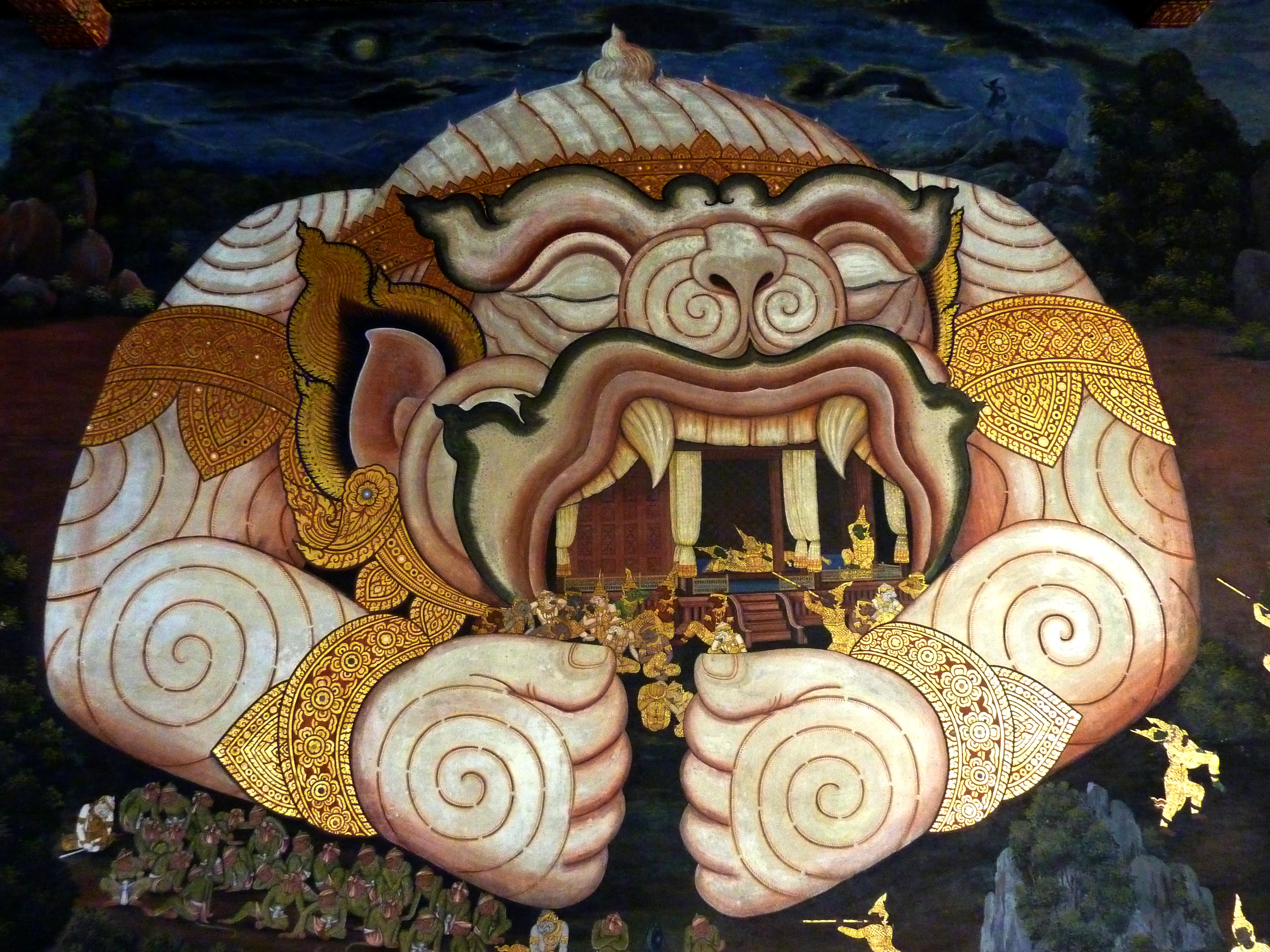
Mural painting of the epic Ramakien depicts the Hanuman enlarging his body to rescue Phra Ram.

Traditional Thai paintings often depict scenes from Buddhist mythology, literature, history, or daily life, blending realism and symbolism. They are mostly found in temples and palaces, where they serve as decorations and illustrations of religious texts. To solve composition problems in empty spaces, Sintao is an important technique used in traditional Thai paintings, which involves dividing the image into sections using secondary elements such as trees, mountains, streams, and rocks, or lines with different patterns. In terms of color, initially, Thai artists used a limited palette of mainly white, black, and red, collectively known as Aekarong, which were made from natural materials. Later, additional colors became more common, including the five main colors known as Benjarong or Kayarong, which include yellow, indigo, scarlet, white, and black. This allowed for a wider range of color combinations, leading to the development of Pahurong, which features more diverse colors such as Tangchae green and Lychee red. The early style of Thai painting was flat and two-dimensional, with little use of light and shadow. However, with the influence of Western art, later artists began to incorporate these elements into their work, resulting in a more naturalistic style.

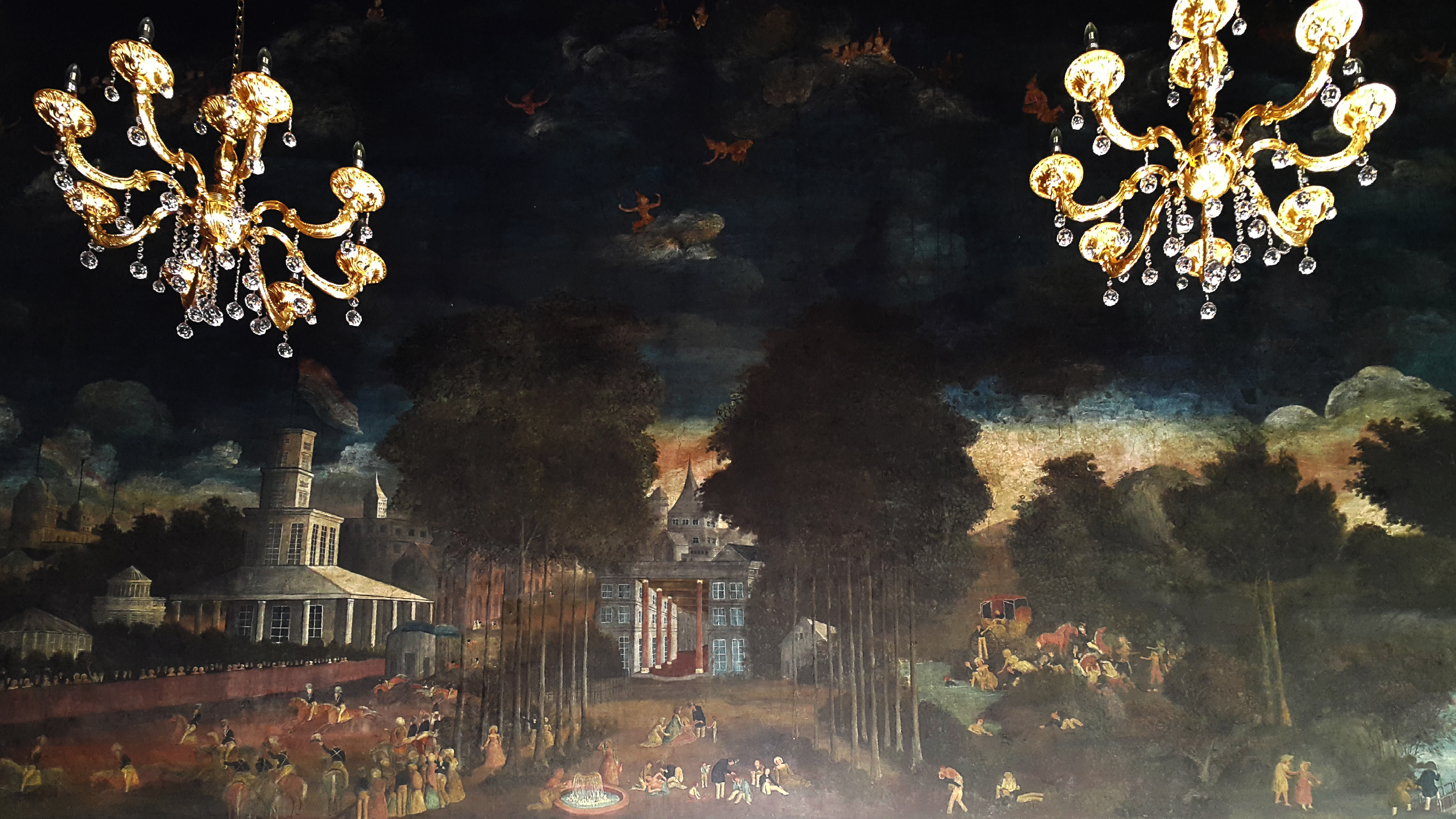
Mural painting in Wat Borom Niwat by Khrua In Khong.

In the 19th century, Thai artists under King Rama IV began experimenting with modernism and abstraction. Khrua In Khong introduced Western techniques such as linear perspective, shading, light, and shadow into traditional Thai painting for a more realistic portrayal of space, depth, volume, and form. Hem Vejakorn was another pioneering artist who explored Western techniques in his paintings. Silpa Bhirasri, an Italian-Thai sculptor who is considered the father of modern art in Thailand, founded Silpakorn University in Bangkok in 1943, which became the leading art school in the country. Fua Hariphitak, a student of Bhirasri, was an avant-garde artist who experimented with Impressionism, Post-Impressionism, and Cubism. His artwork featured thick, bold brushstrokes and vivid colors to convey the essence of different locations and moods. Sawad Tantisuk, a notable artist in the modern Thai painting movement, was recognized for his use of bold colors and geometric shapes to create abstract compositions. Chakrabhand Posayakrit is another artist of note, who fuses traditional Thai painting with modern aesthetics in his work.

Contemporary Thai painting builds upon the experimentation and incorporation of Western techniques that began in the 19th century. Today, many Thai painters continue to explore new techniques and styles, resulting in a diverse range of approaches and aesthetics. For example, Navin Rawanchaikul's paintings incorporate pop art influences and bright colors, while Natee Utarit's surreal and sometimes disturbing images comment on contemporary society. Jirapat Tatsanasomboon draws inspiration from Thai folklore and mythology to create intricate and fantastical works. Meanwhile, Sakarin Krue-On's abstract works explore the relationship between art and nature, and Chatchai Puipia's paintings combine figurative and abstract elements to examine the human condition.

=== Architecture ===
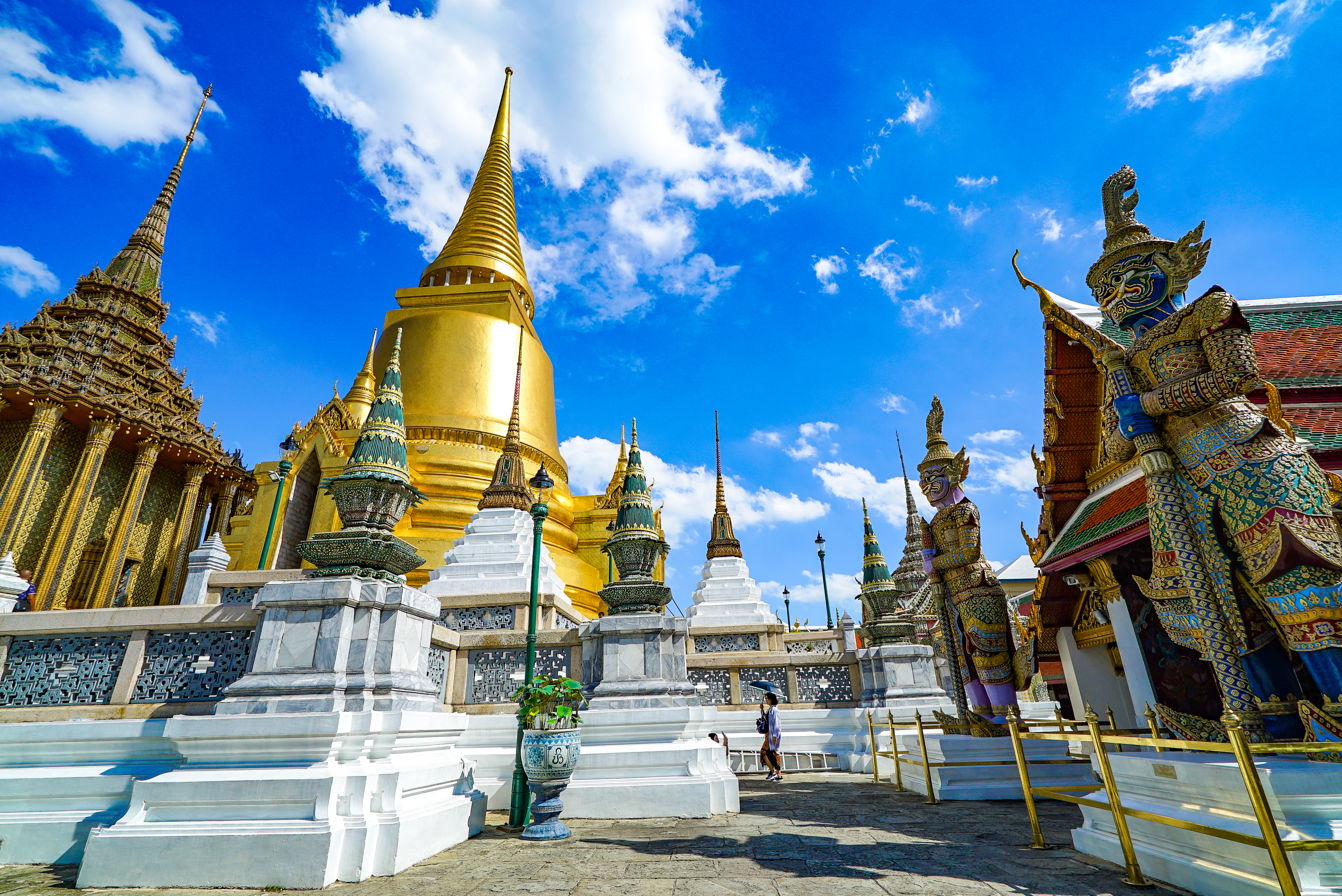
Wat Phra Kaew, an example of early Rattanakosin period architecture located in Bangkok's historic Rattanakosin Island.

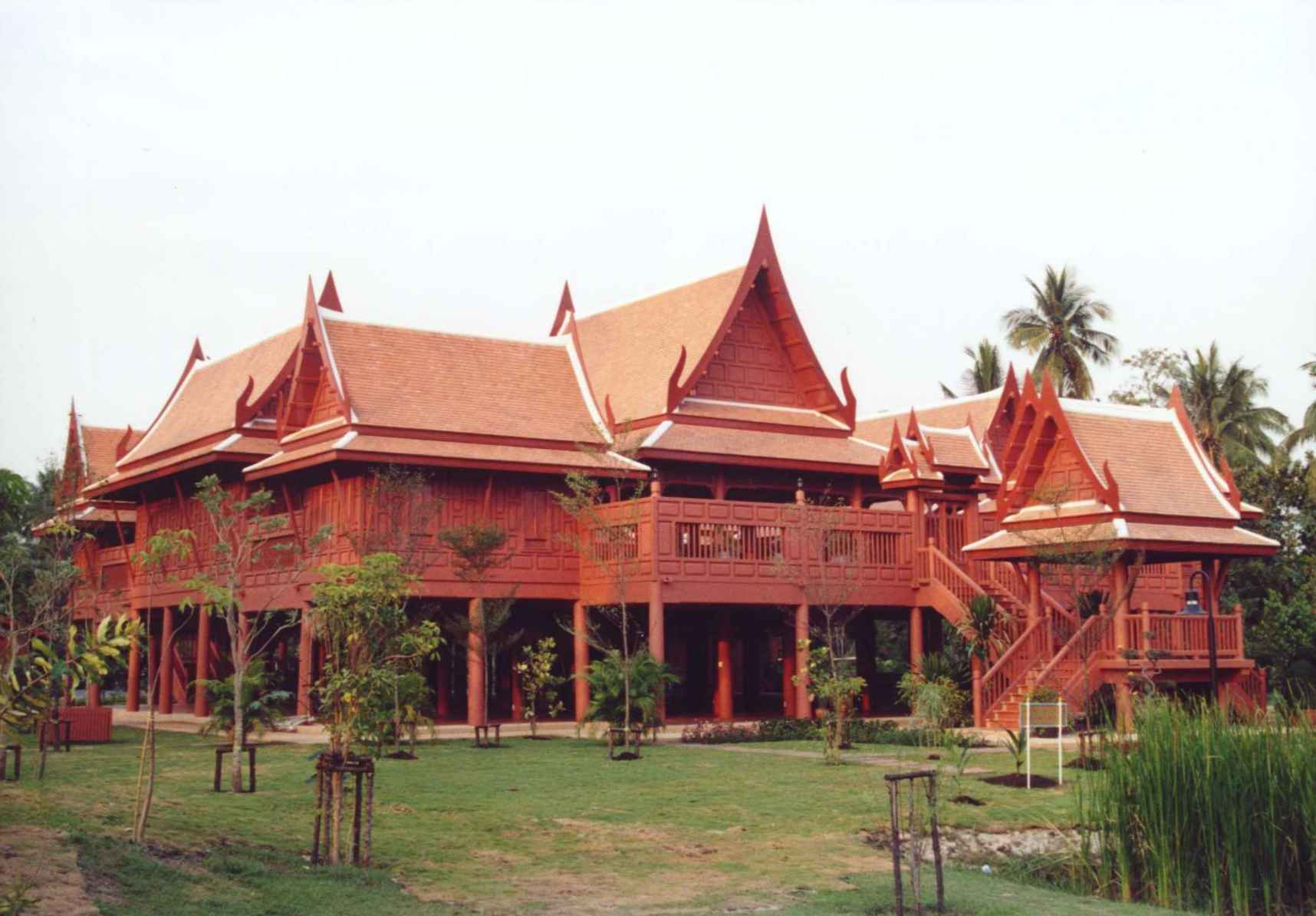
A group of traditional Thai houses at King Rama II Memorial Park in Amphawa, Samut Songkhram.

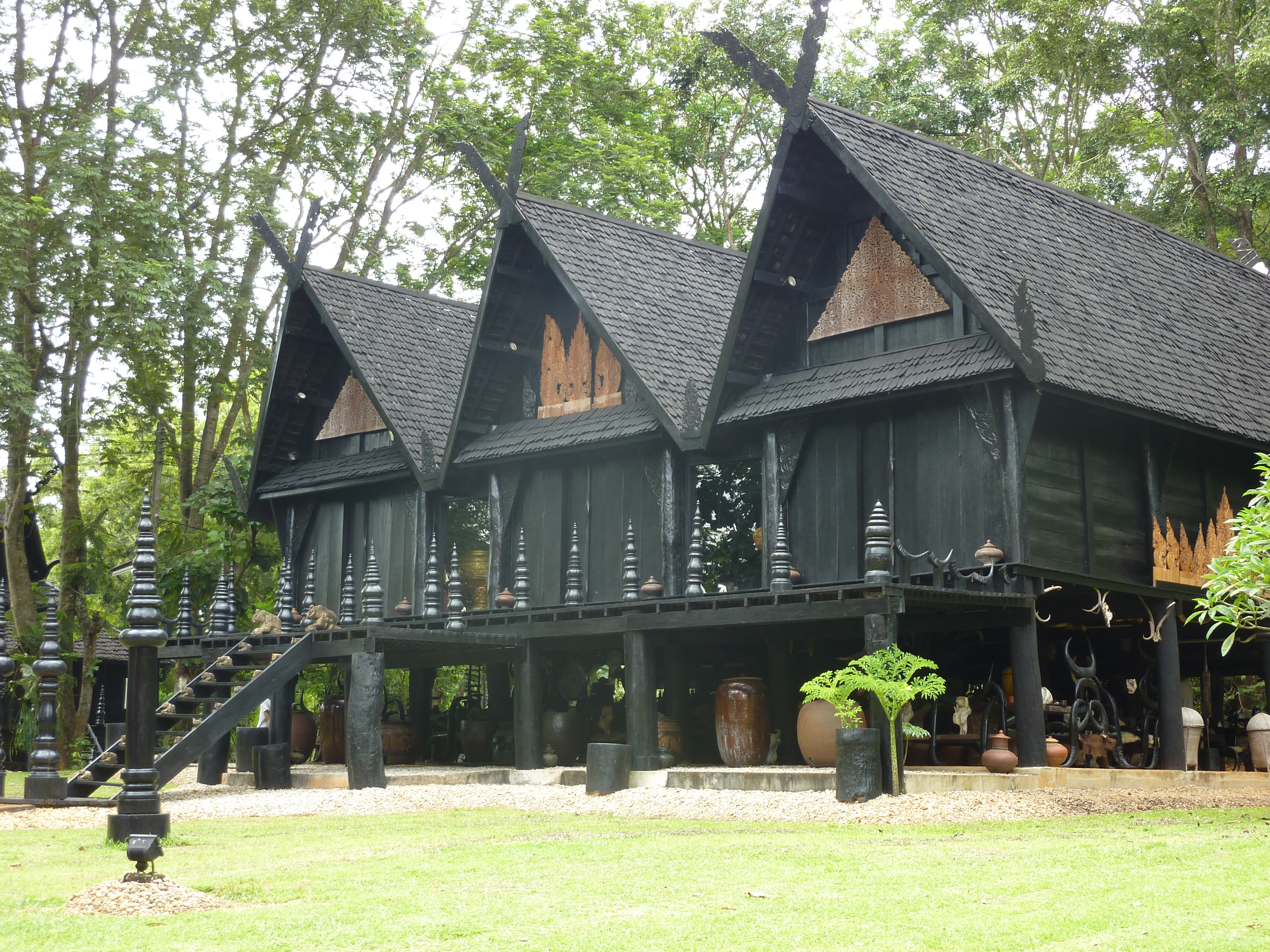
A group of Kalae houses, traditional northern Thai house located at Thawan Duchanee's house in Chiang Rai.

Traditional Thai houses are usually constructed of natural materials such as bamboo or wood, and elevated on stilts to protect against floods and pests. The steeply gabled roofs facilitate efficient rainwater drainage. Designs vary depending on location, climate, and function, while also emphasizing natural materials and airy designs to create environmentally suitable habitats with good ventilation. The houses often feature high roofs and shaded areas like roof terraces and patio planters.

Buddhist temples in Thailand are known as wats, from the Pāḷi vāṭa, meaning an enclosure. A temple has an enclosing wall that divides it from the secular world. Wat architecture has seen many changes in Thailand in the course of history. Although there are many differences in layout and style, they all adhere to the same principles.

In contemporary Thai architecture, there has been a fusion of traditional Thai and modern styles. The Sanctuary of Truth and Wat Rong Khun are two popular examples of this fusion. The Sanctuary of Truth is a wooden temple that showcases intricate carvings and sculptures, while Wat Rong Khun is a unique temple designed entirely in white with glass and mirror mosaics.

Architectures of Thailand

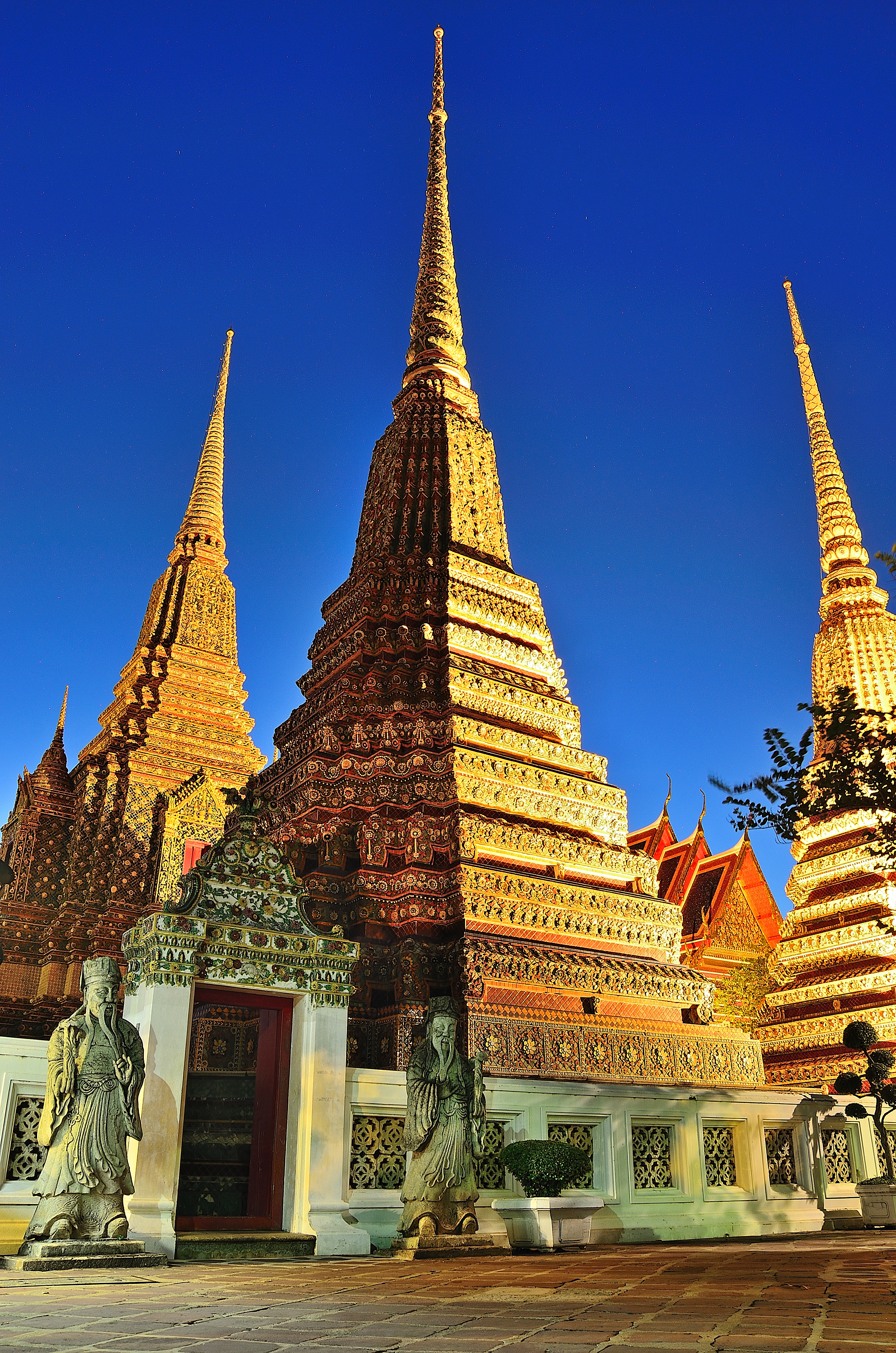
Wat Pho, Bangkok.

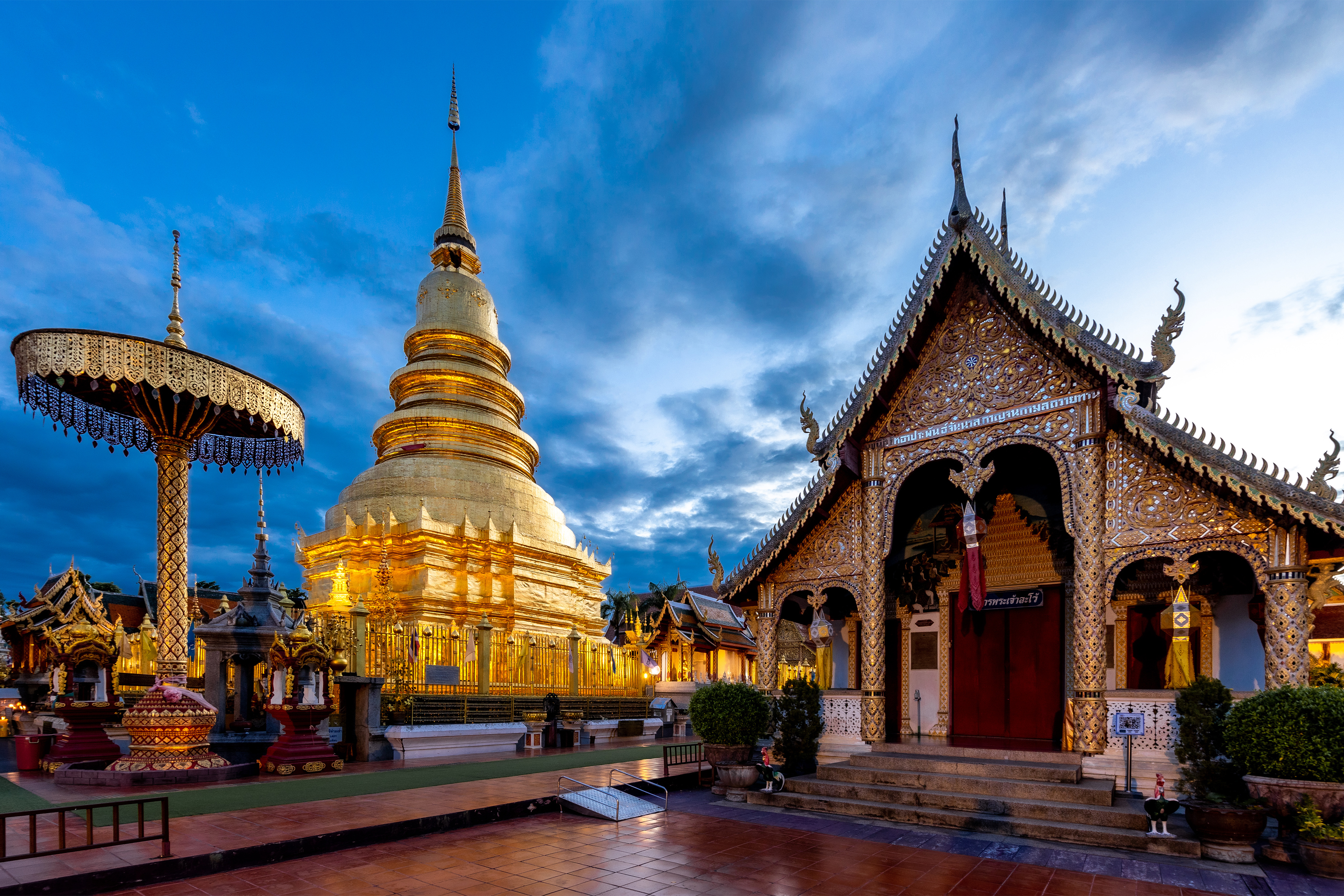
Wat Phra That Hariphunchai, Lamphun.

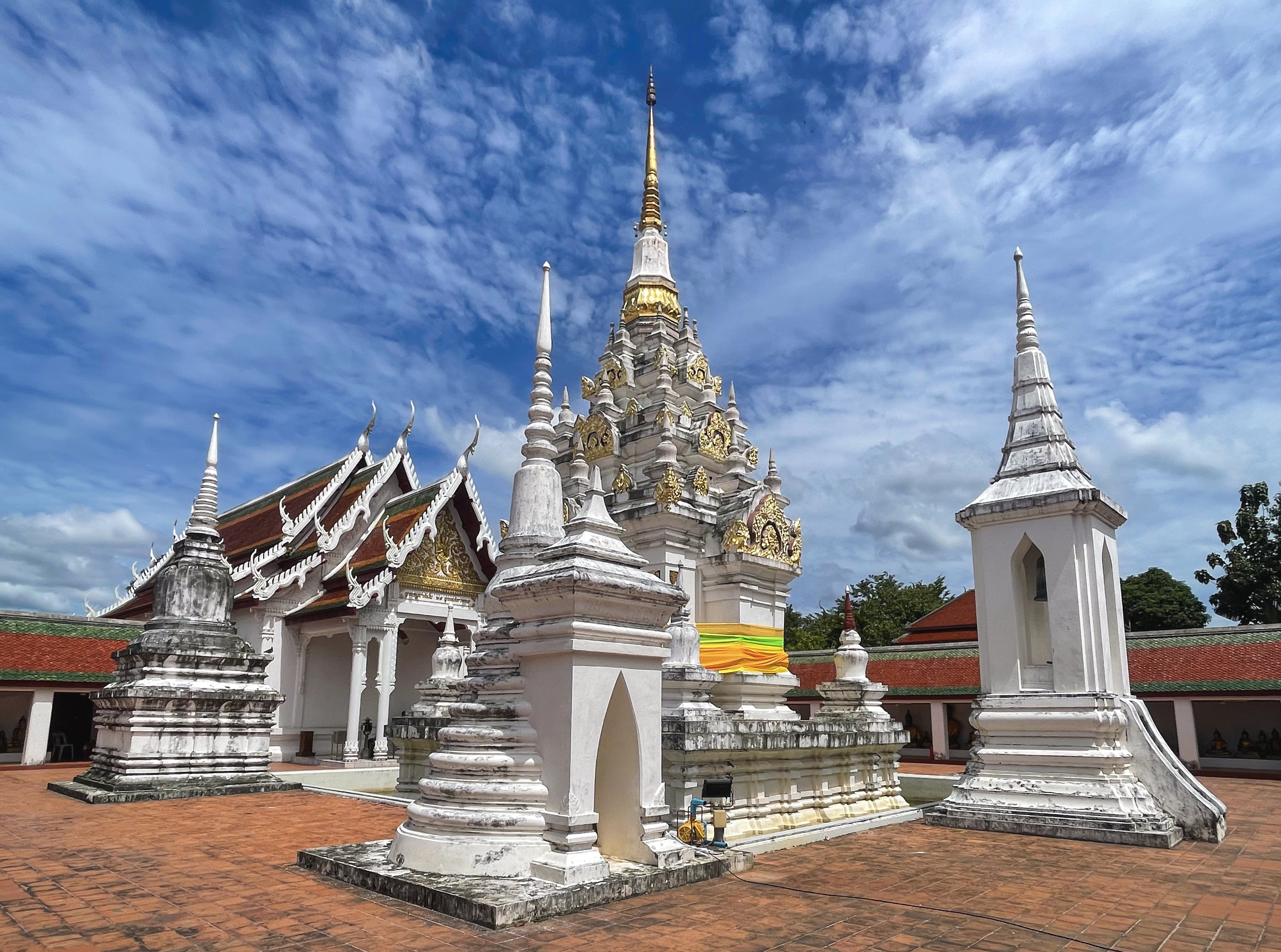
Wat Phra Borommathat Chaiya Ratcha Worawihan, Surat Thani.

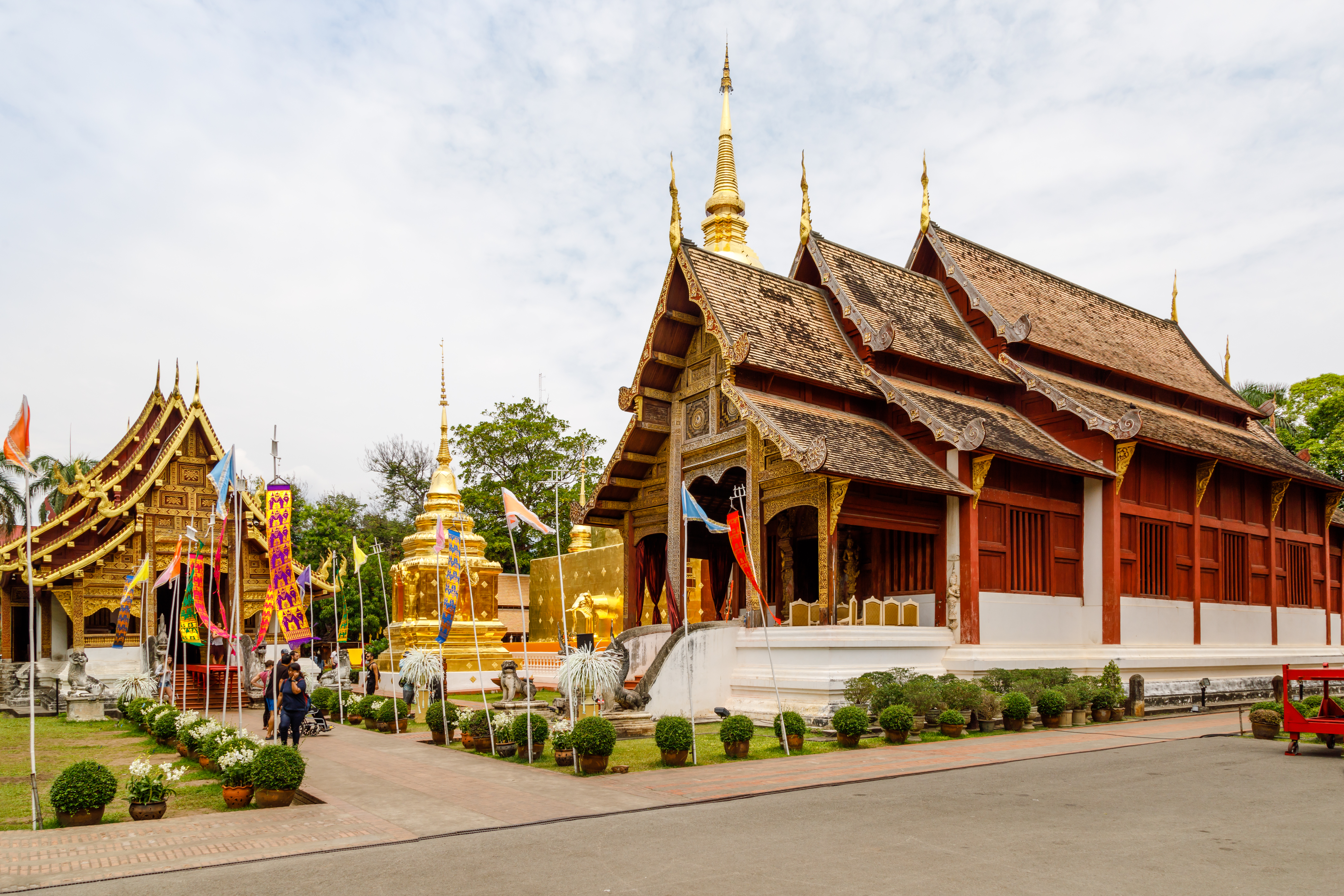
Wat Phra Sing, Chiang Mai

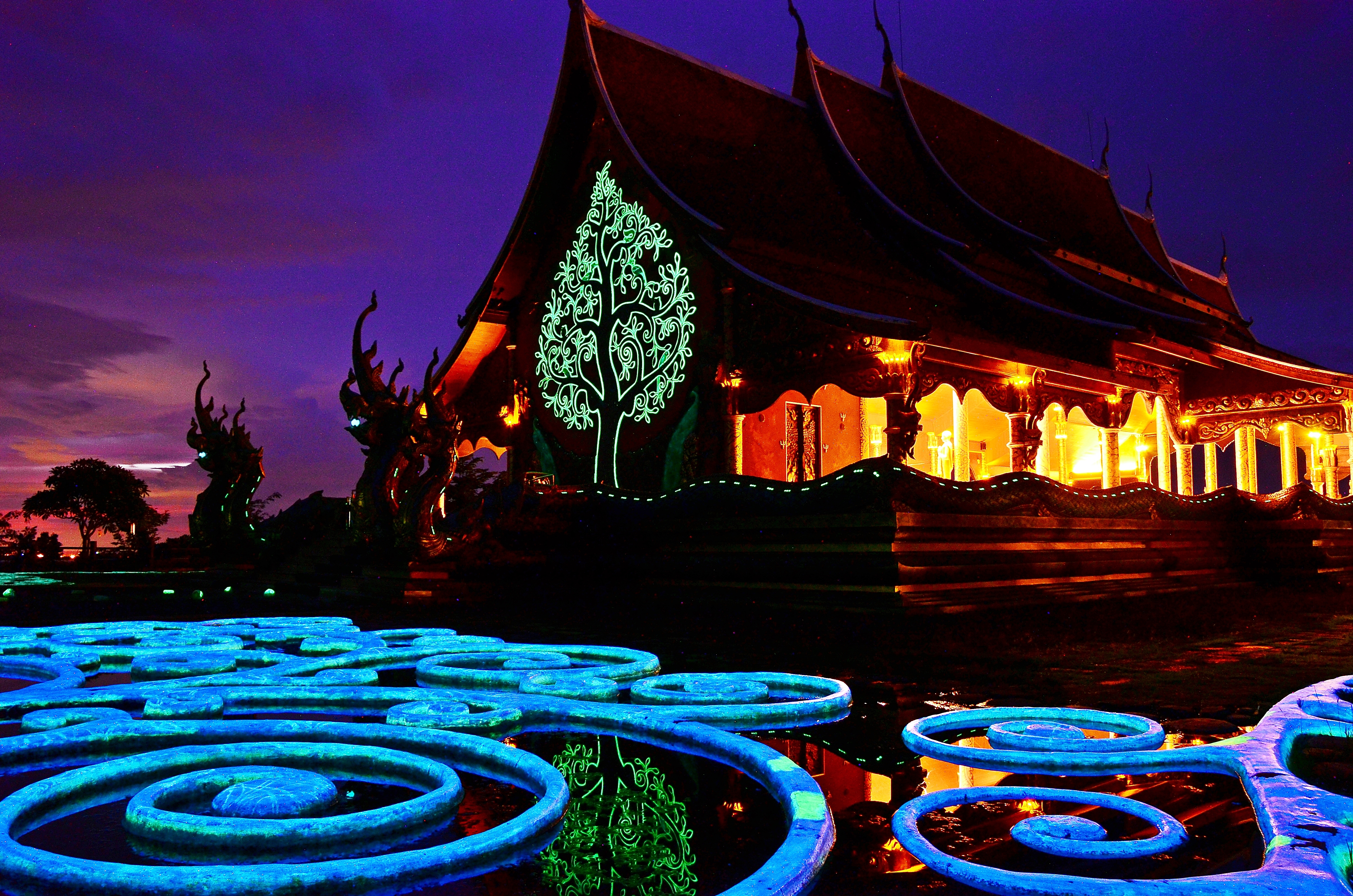
Wat Sirindhorn Wararam Phu Phrao, Ubon Ratchathani

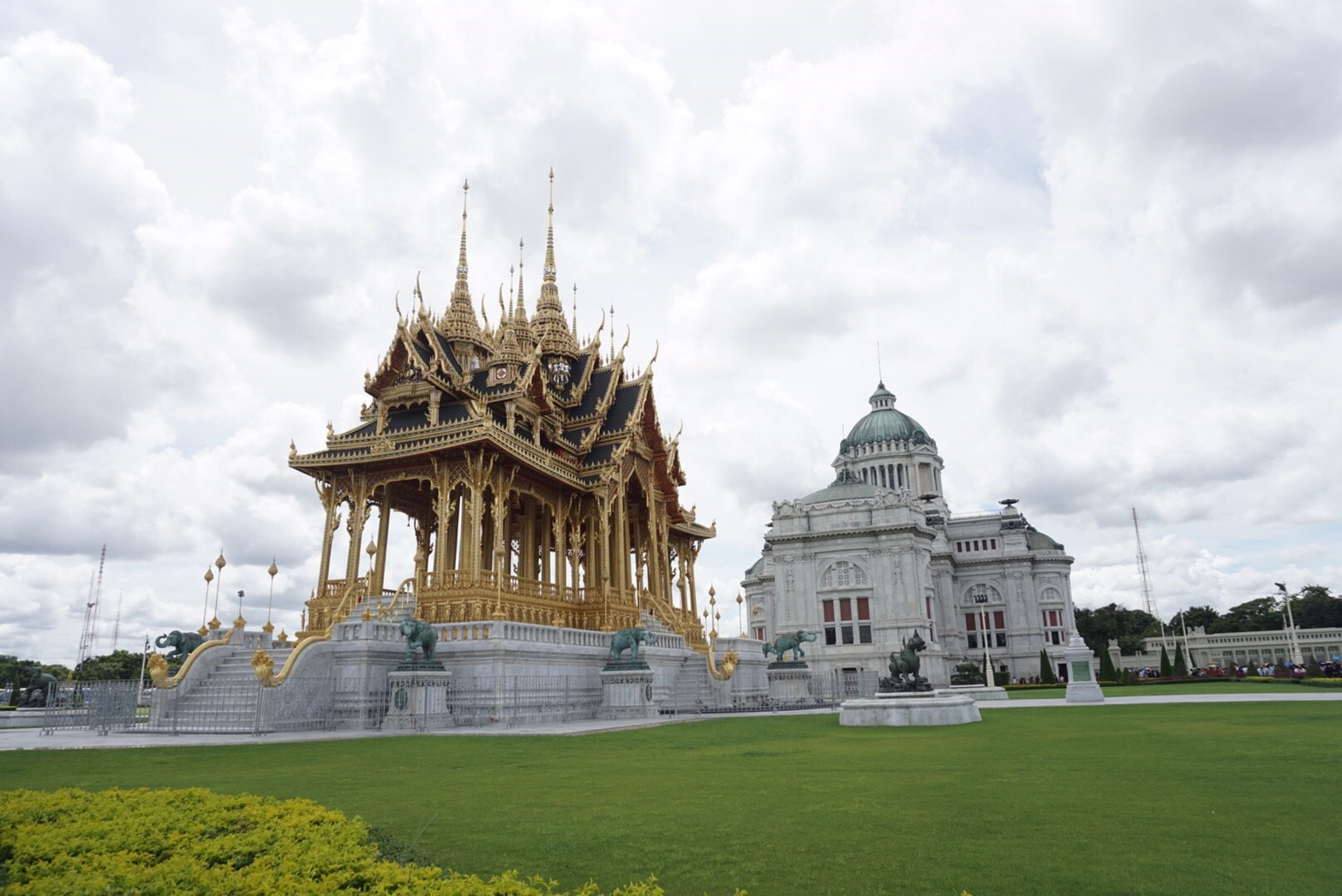
Ananta Samakhom Throne Hall, Bangkok.

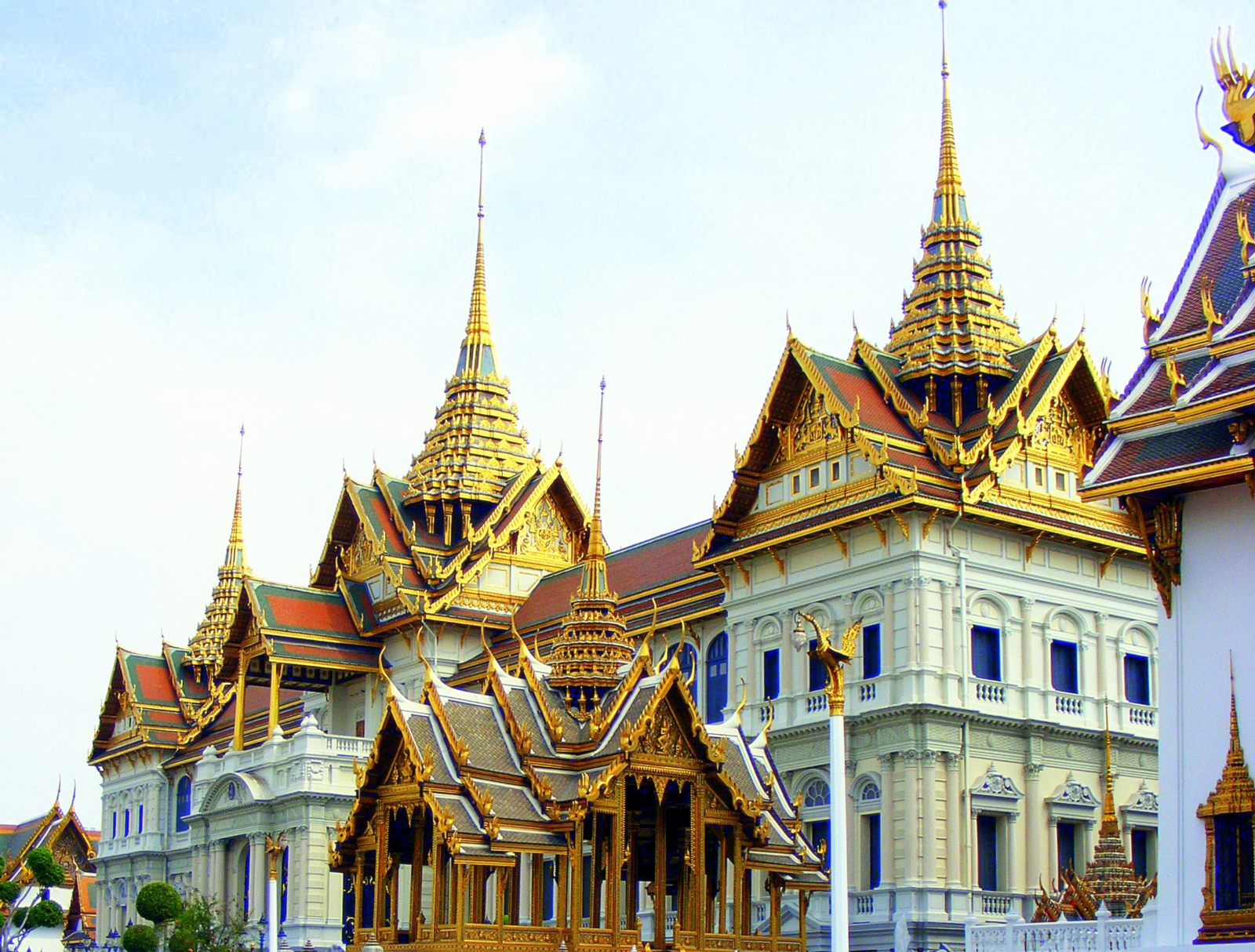
Phra Thinang Chakri Maha Prasat, Bangkok.

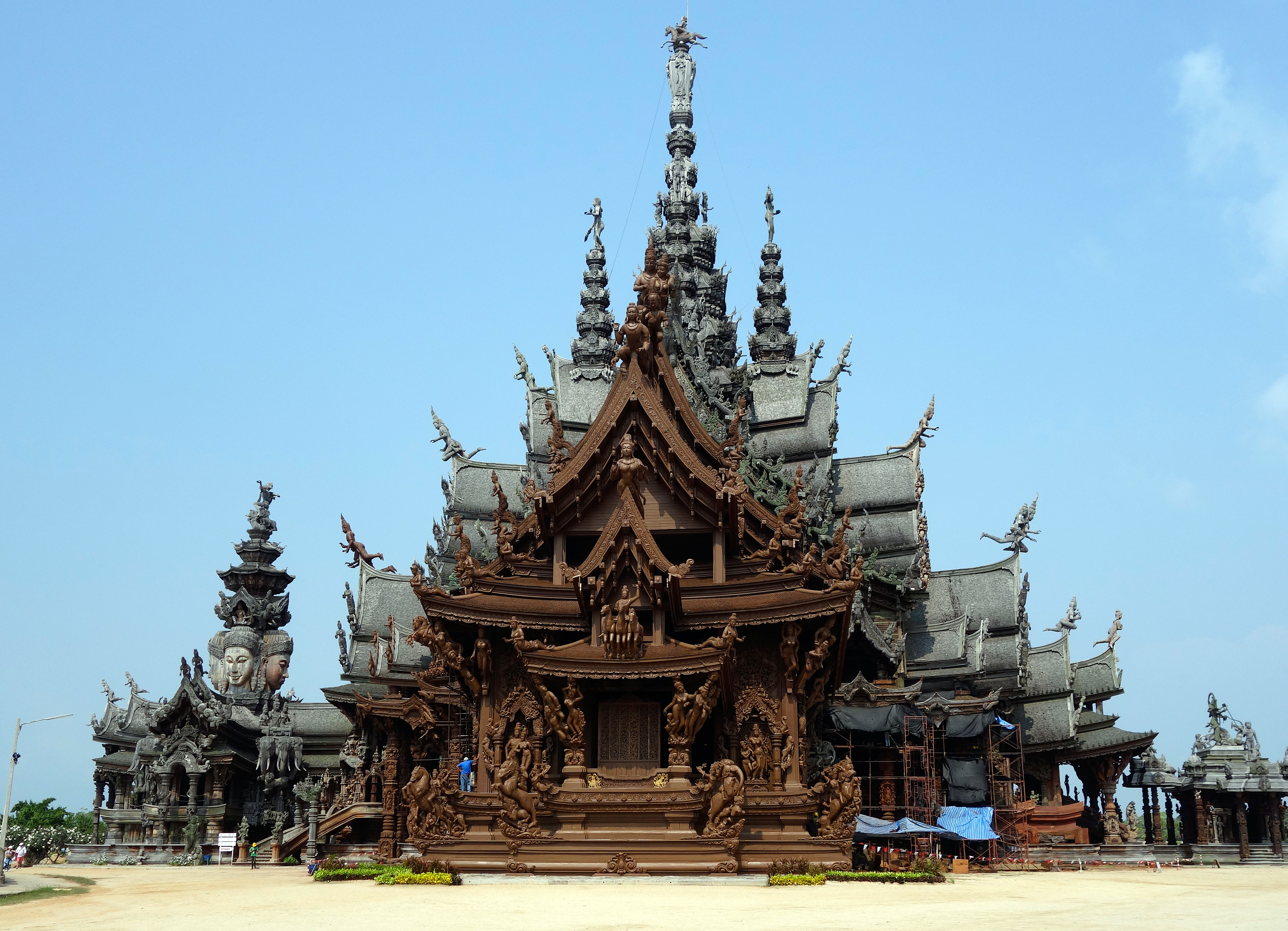
Sanctuary of Truth, Pattaya

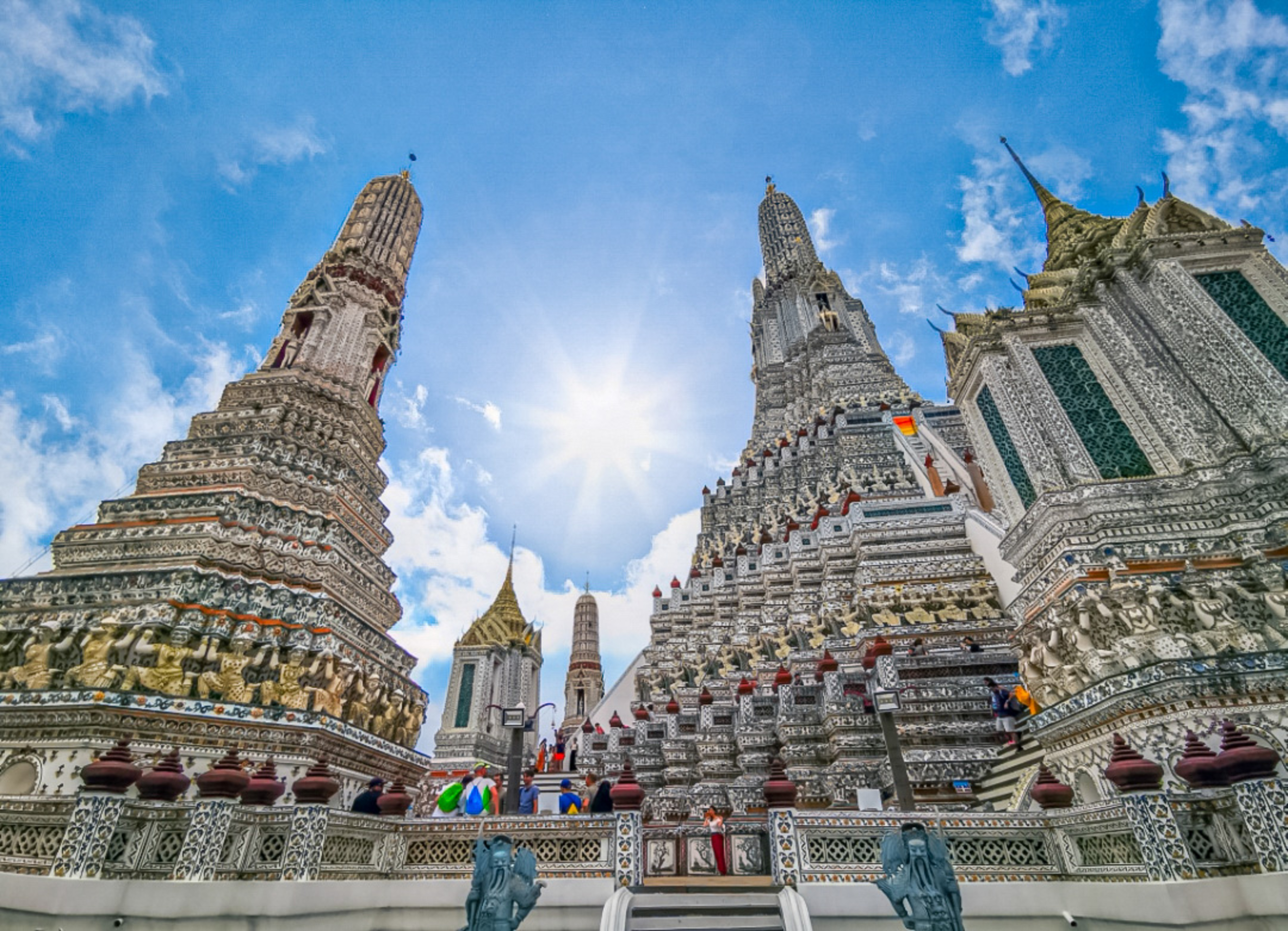
Wat Arun, Bangkok

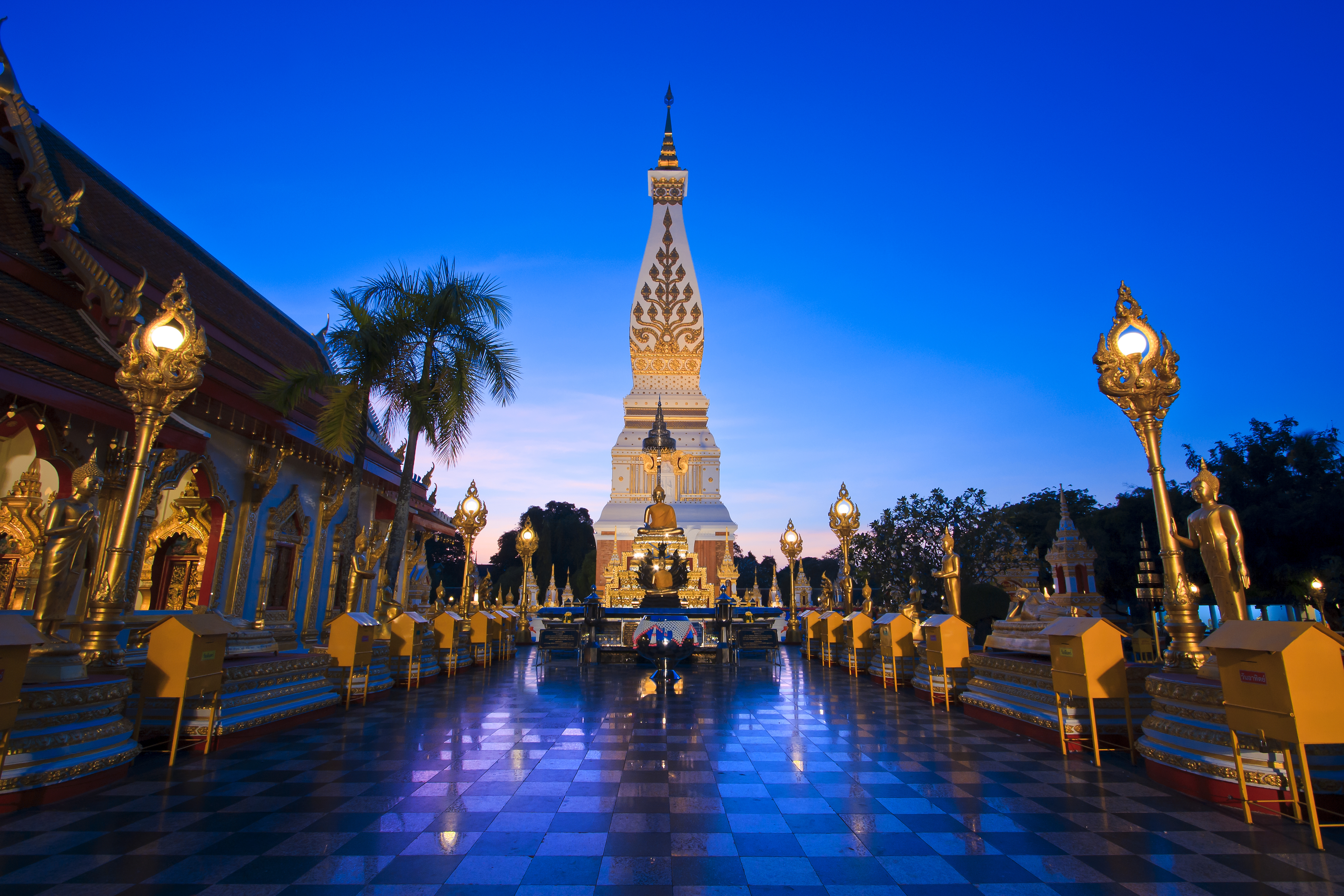
Wat Phra That Phanom, Nakhon Phanom

== Literature ==
Thai literature reflects the history, culture, religion, and worldview of the Thai people, as well as their interactions with other nations and peoples. One of the earliest forms of Thai literature is the stone inscription, which records historical events, royal decrees, religious teachings, and cultural values. The Ramkhamhaeng inscription of 1292, which is considered the first Thai literary work written in the Thai script, describes matters of faith, feats of kings, and the way of life of commoners. Another notable work from this period is Traiphummikatha, also known as Trai phum phra ruang. It is a treatise on Buddhist cosmology and traditional worldview and beliefs, and was composed by King Lithai in 1345. It is recognized as the first Thai Buddhist literary work and the earliest example of a scholarly thesis in the country.

During the Ayutthaya period, various literary forms were developed. The earliest known Ayutthaya work was Lilit Ongkan Chaeng Nam. Other notable works from this period include Lilit Yuan Phai, Lilit Phra Lo, Mahachat Kham Luang, Nirat Hariphunchai, Khun Chang Khun Phaen, Sri Thanonchai, The Legend of Phra Malai, and Nang Sib Song. The Ayutthaya period ended in 1767, resulting in the loss of literary works. The Thonburi period was a transitional period until the establishment of a new capital in 1782, beginning the Rattanakosin period. Many classical works, such as Ramakien and Sang Thong, were revived and adapted during this time, along with improvements in prose composition. King Rama II was responsible for repairing and reviving important literary works. Sunthorn Phu was a prominent poet in this period, best known for his epic poem Phra Aphai Mani.

=== Poetry ===
Thai poetry, includes forms such as klong, chan, kap, klon and rai, which are based on rhyme, rhythm, tonal patterns, and syllabic structures. Poetry was used to express various themes such as religion, romance, war, and nature.

== Performing arts ==
=== Dance ===
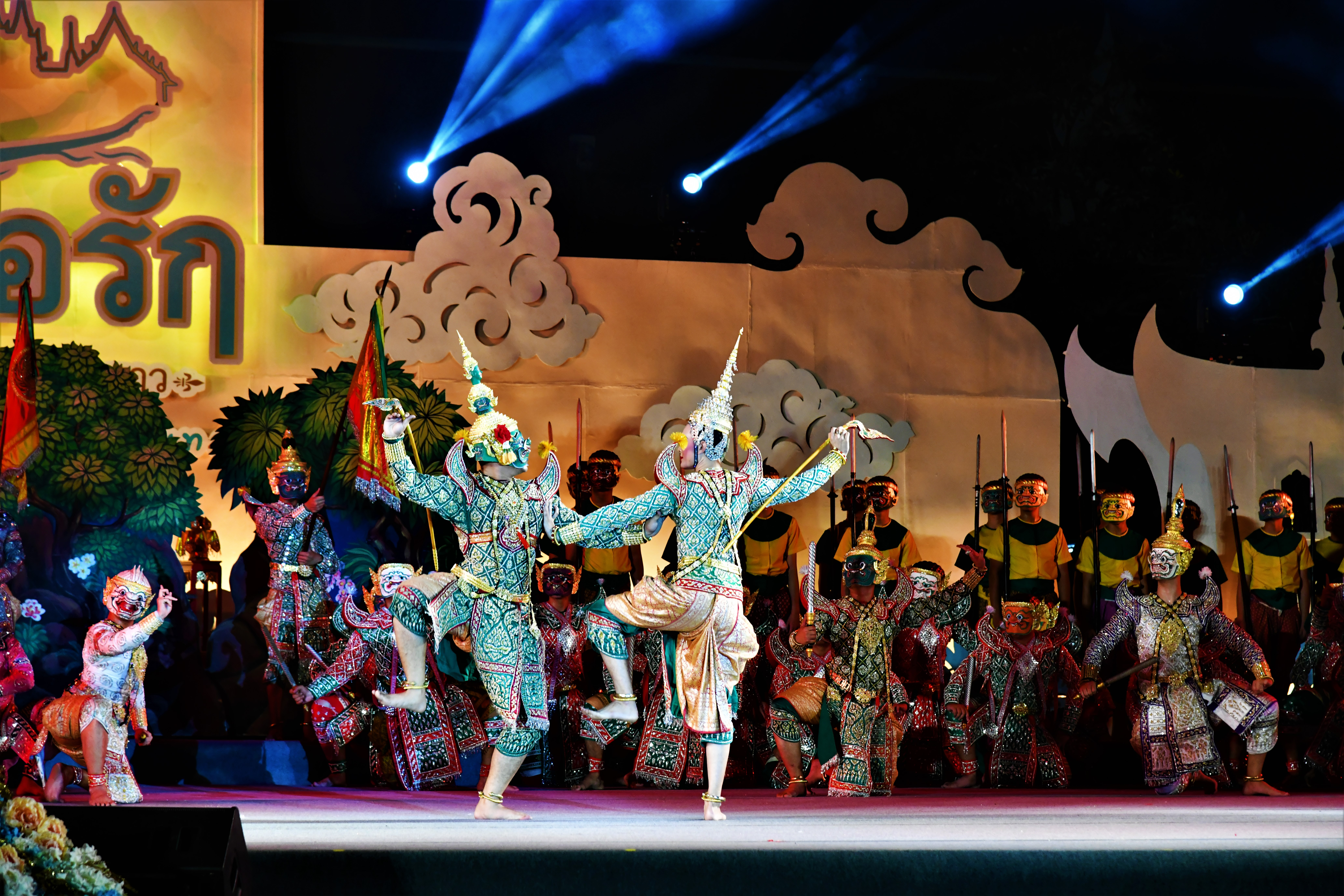
The image depicts Khon, a traditional dance drama that has been recognized as a UNESCO Intangible Cultural Heritage since 2018.

Thai classical dance has several main types of dance including Rabam, Ram, Fon/Sueng/Manora, Khon, and Lakhon. Within these categories, there are subtypes. The first detailed European record of Thai classical dances was made during the Ayutthaya Kingdom, which described a tradition and style that is still seen today. During the reign of King Narai, Ayutthaya had formal diplomatic relations with Louis XIV, the Sun King of France. In 1687, French diplomat Simon de la Loubère was sent to record Ayutthaya Kingdom traditions. In his account, La Loubère described Khon as a figure dance with armed and masked dancers representing combat. He also recorded Lakhon, a three-day epic and dramatic poem sung by several actors, and Rabam, a slow march round dance with contorted body and arm movements. Khon dancers wore gilded paper-bonnets with hanging sides adorned with counterfeit stones and pendants of gilded wood.

Thai classical dance took a profound influence from neighboring countries such as Cambodia, Myanmar, and Laos. It is widely regarded as a highly refined and sophisticated art form, with intricate movements, ornate costumes, and complex choreography.

=== Music ===
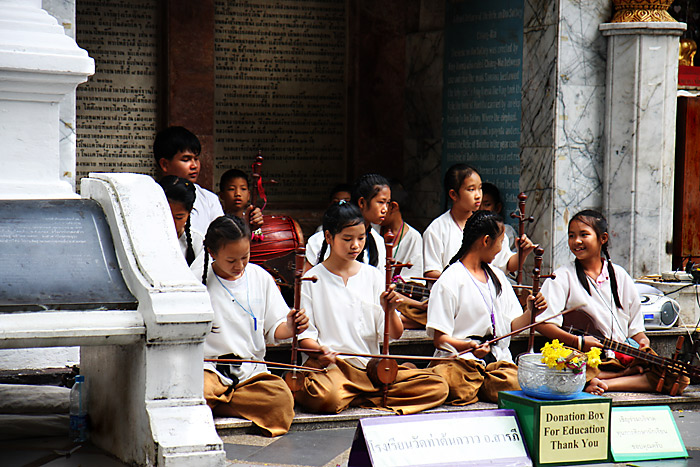
Schoolgirls and boys playing khrueang sai in front of a temple

The music of Thailand can be categorized into two main genres: classical and popular. Thai classical music, also known as Phleng Thai-derm, is the most revered form of Thai music and is considered the pinnacle of the country's unique musical heritage, took profound inspiration from the Pin Peat music of ancient Khmer. With a history dating back centuries, classical music in Thailand is known for its intricate melodies and use of traditional instruments such as the ranat (xylophone), khong (gong), pi (oboe), saw (fiddle), khim (hammered dulcimer), chakhe (wooden percussion instrument), phin namtao (plucked string instrument), krachappi (percussion instrument), khaen (mouth organ), and khlui (flute), among others. Its importance to Thai culture is reflected in its use in royal ceremonies, religious rituals, and other formal occasions. In addition to ensemble genres such as piphat, khruang sai, and mahori, Thai classical music includes a total of 981 categorized classical songs.

Thai popular music, also known as phleng Thai sakon, on the other hand, can be divided into two categories: traditional country music and modern music. The former includes genres such as luk thung, luk krung, and mor lam, which are associated with country or regional music and are popular domestically. Luk thung, specifically, is a favorite among the majority of Thai citizens throughout the country. The latter category comprises modern music genres that have gained popularity in recent years and are influenced by Western and other Asian music styles, such as pop, rock, and hip-hop. These genres often incorporate instruments like the guitar, keyboard, drum, and synthesizer and are frequently sung in standard Thai or English.

Traditional musical instruments of Thailand

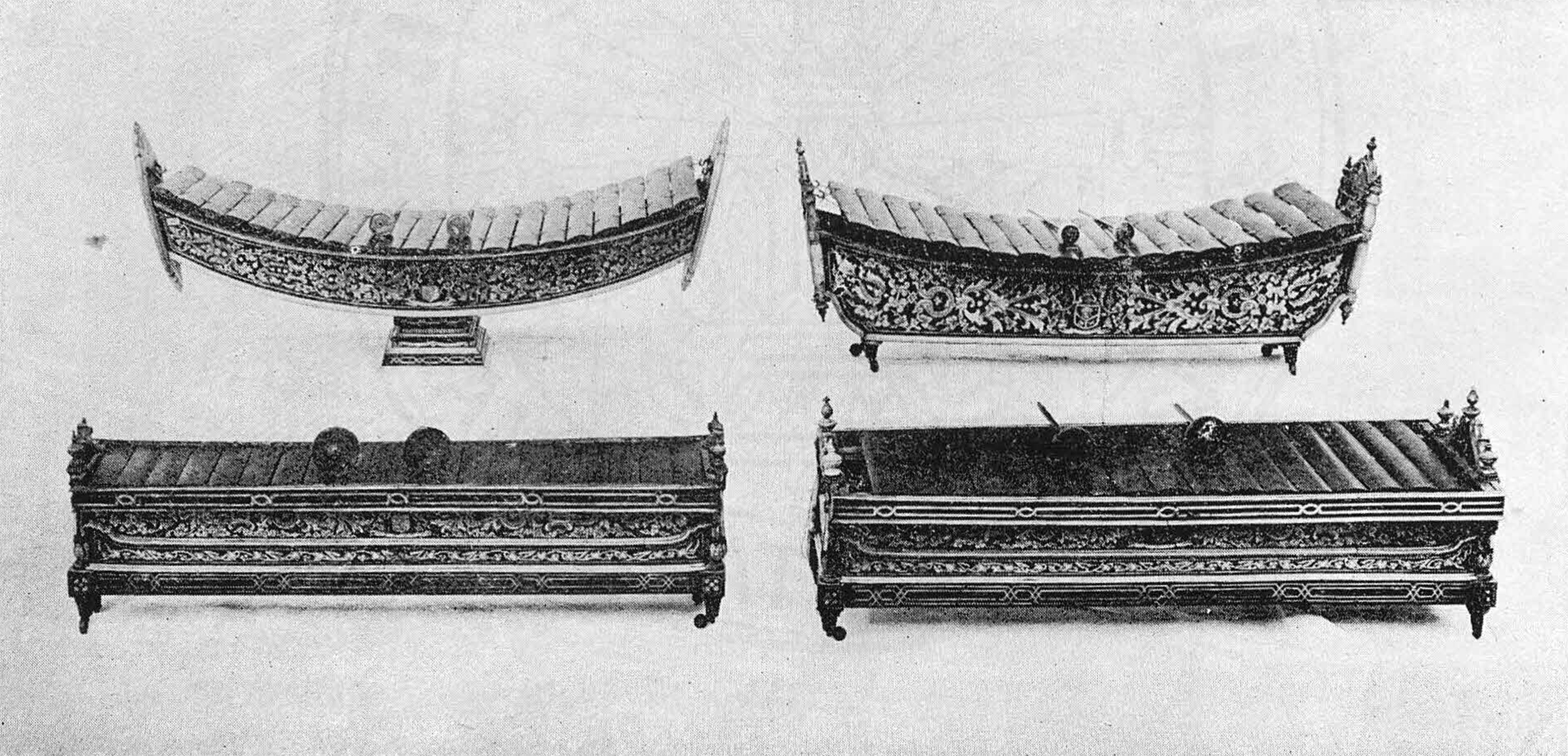
From upper left to lower right: ranat ek, ranat thum, ranat thong, and ranat lek.

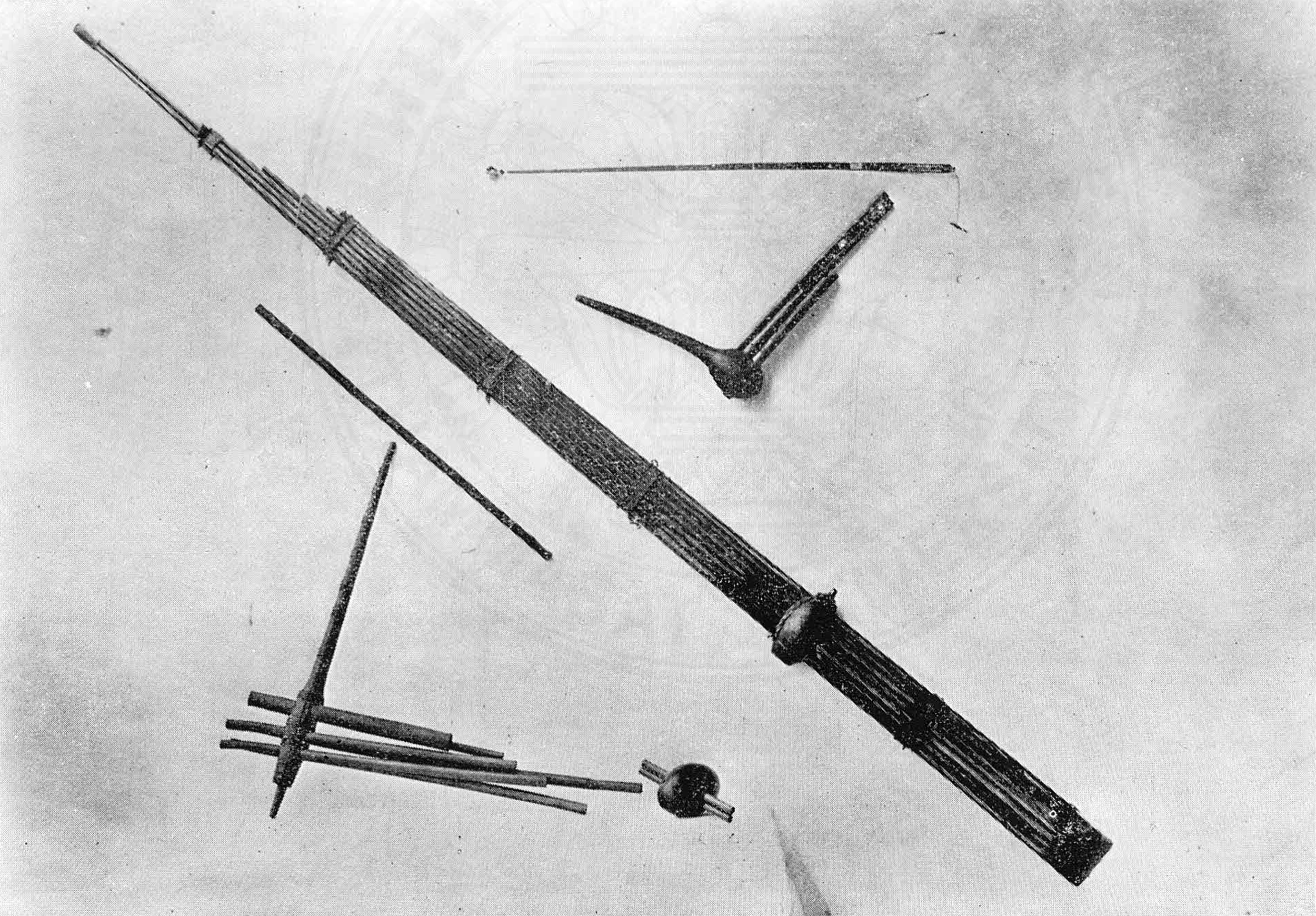
From top to bottom: chongnong, no, khaen, pi so, teng, and rerai.

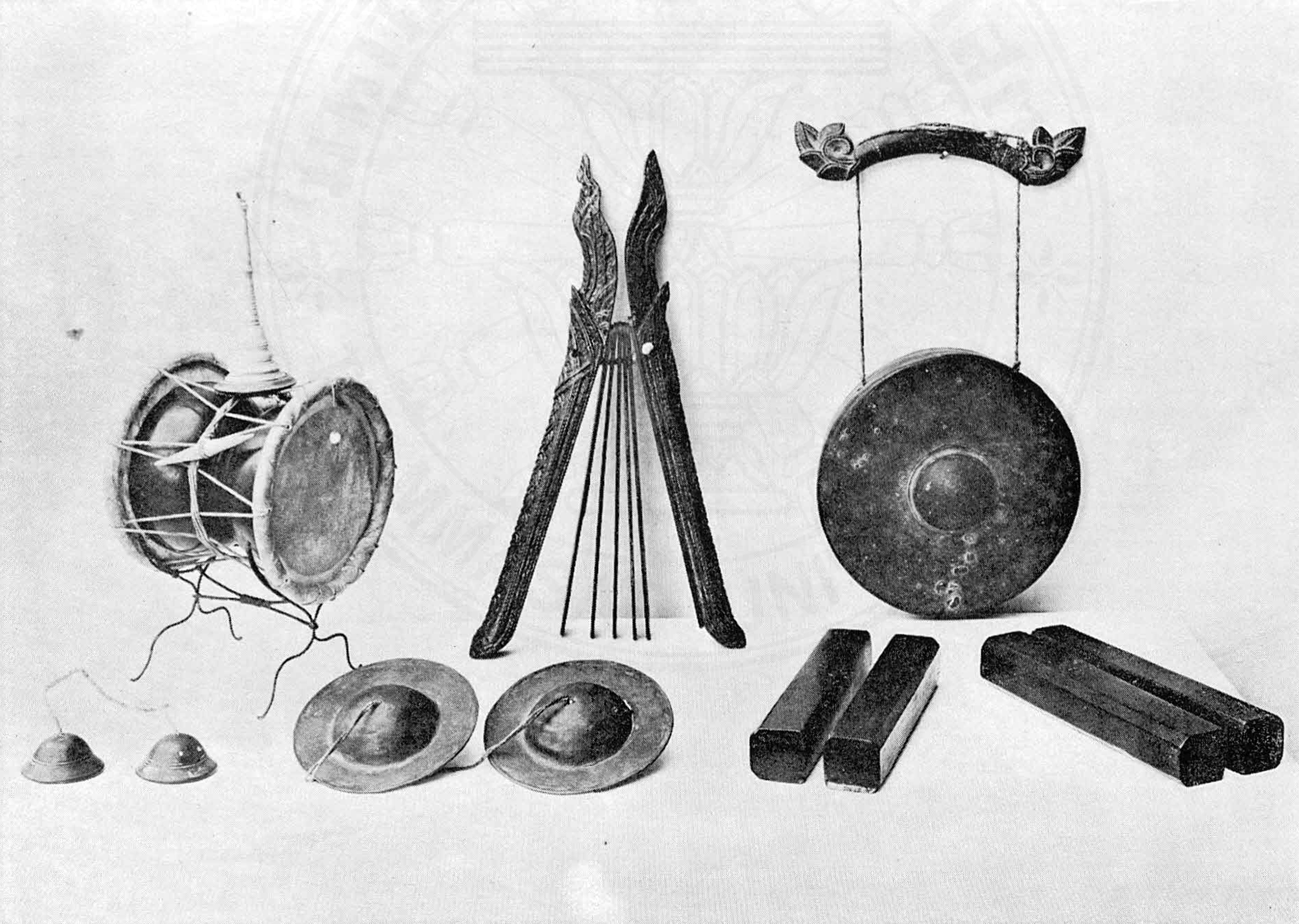
From upper left to lower right: bando, krap phuang, khong mong, ching, chap, and krap sepha (two instruments shown).

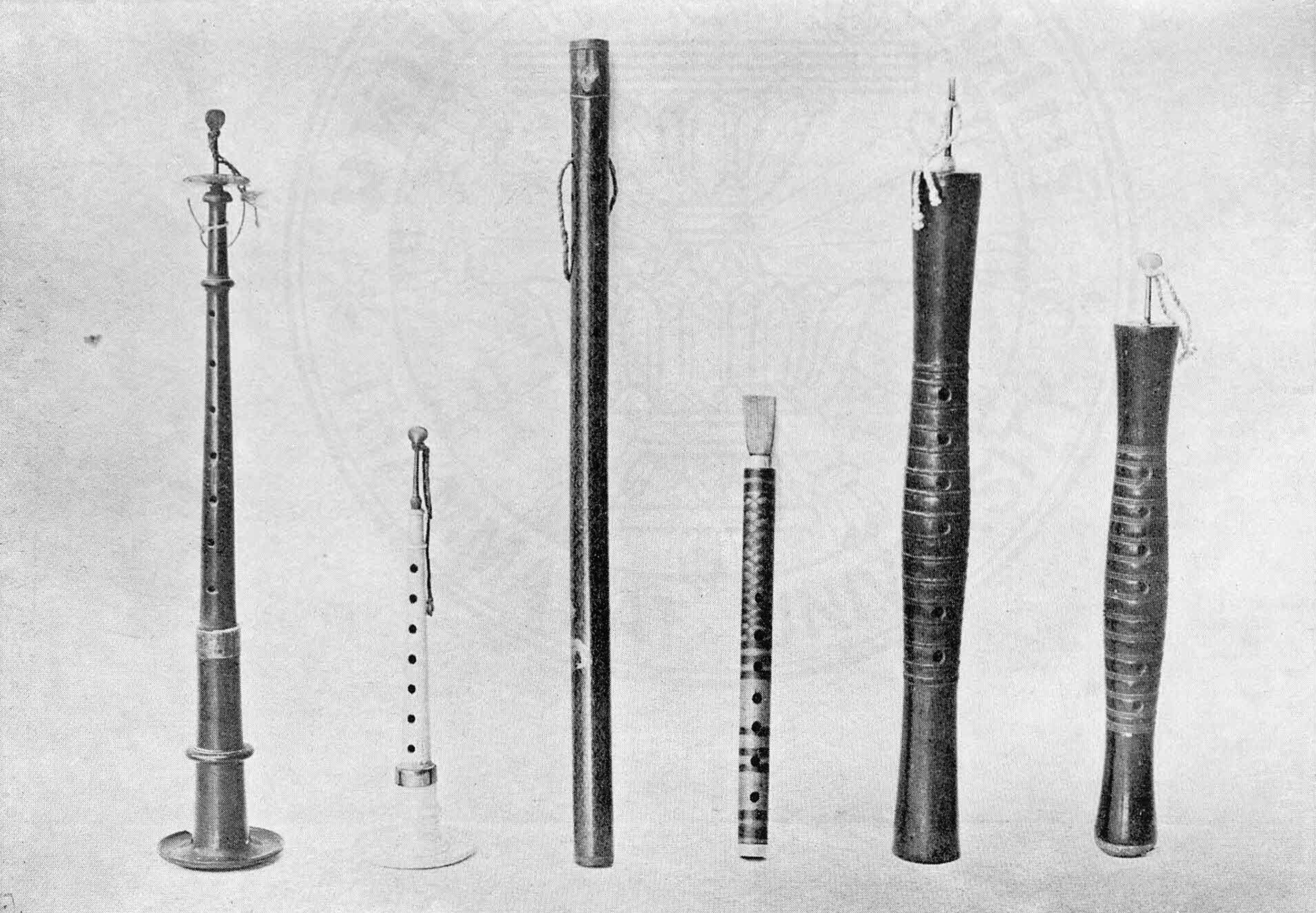
From left to right: pi chawa, pi chanai, khlui, pi o, pi nai, pi nok.

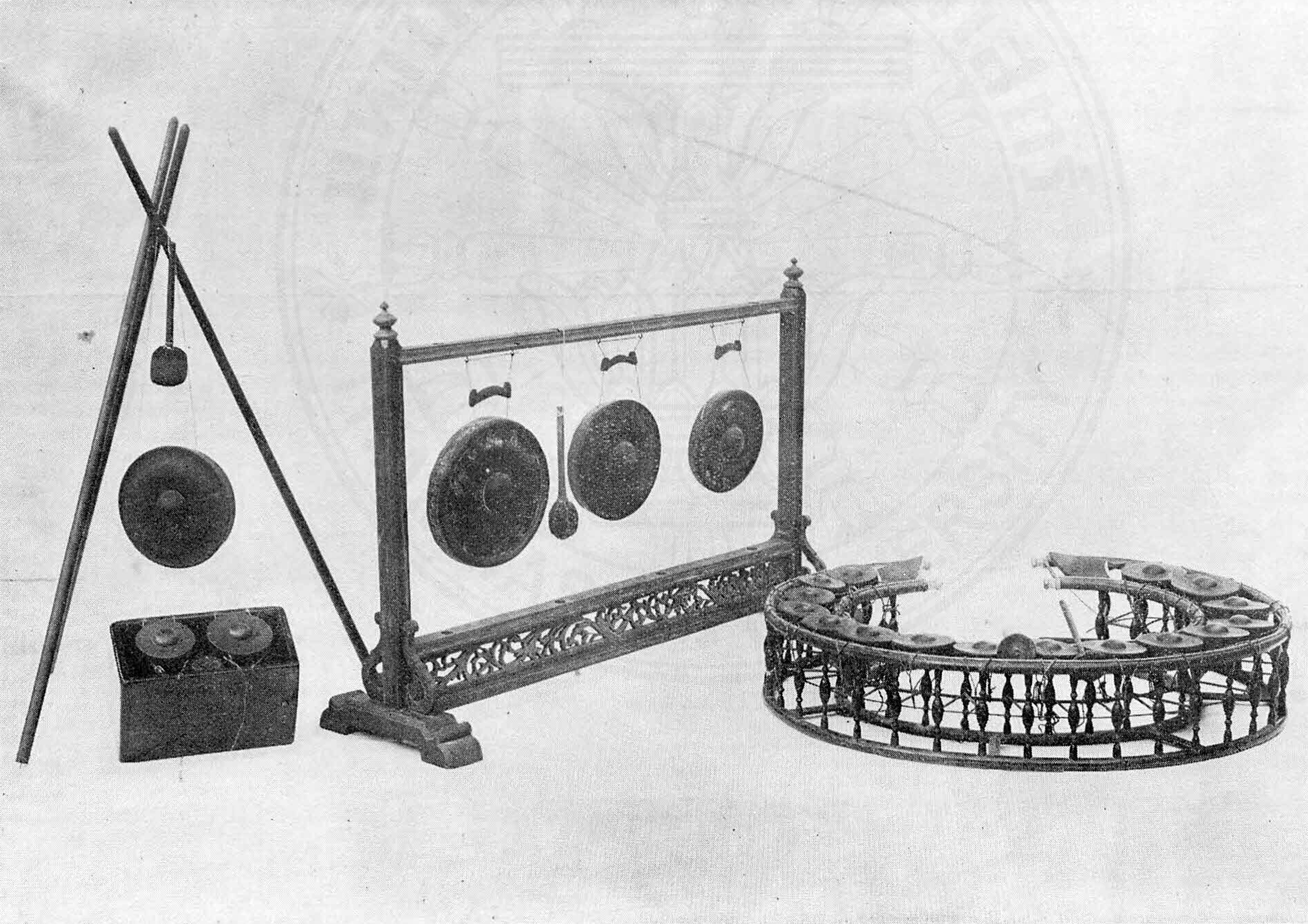
From left to right: khong mong (on stand); and adaptations of khong mong: khong khu (on floor), khong rabeng, and khong wong.

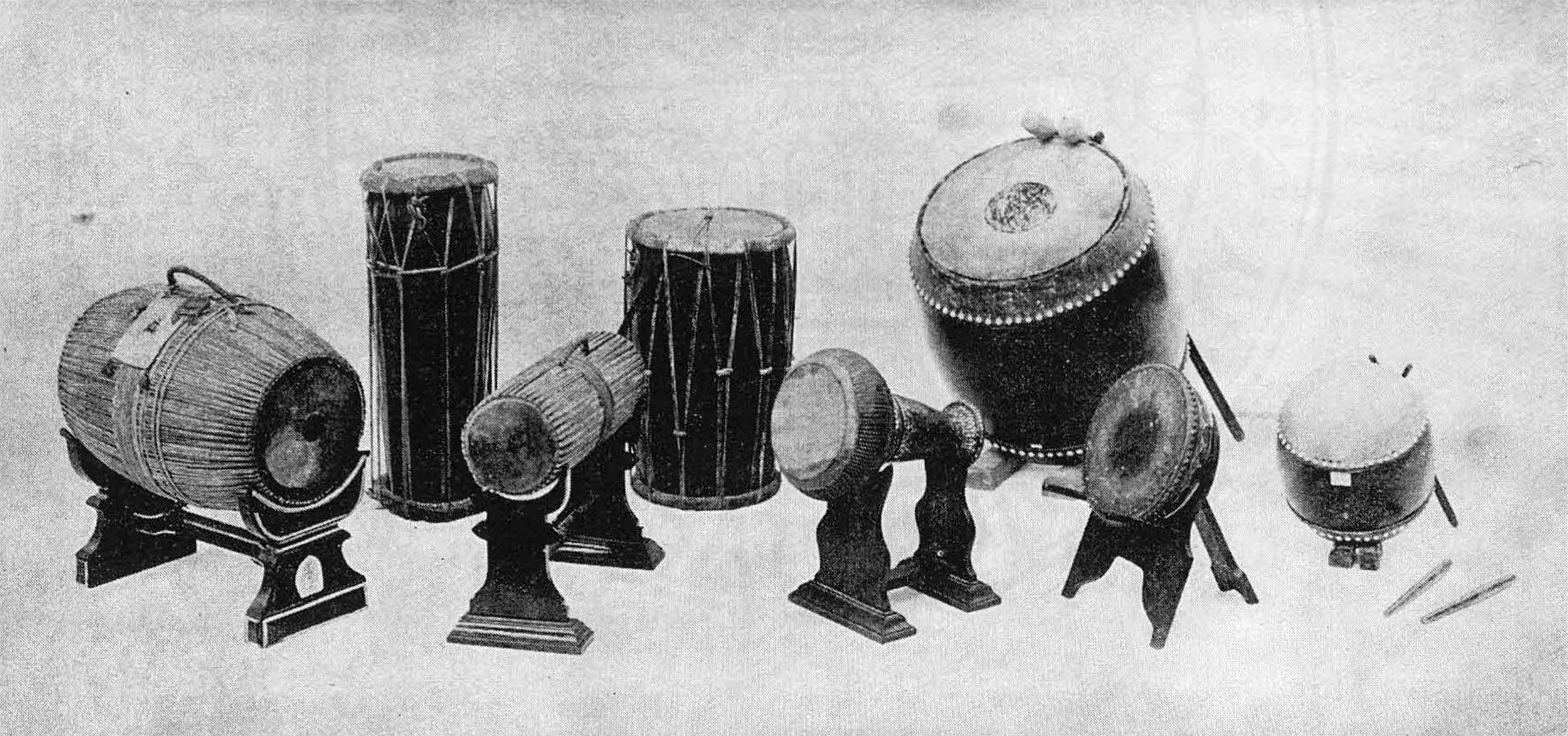
From left to right: taphon, klong khaek, klong malayu, poengmang, thon, klong that, rammana, klong chatri.

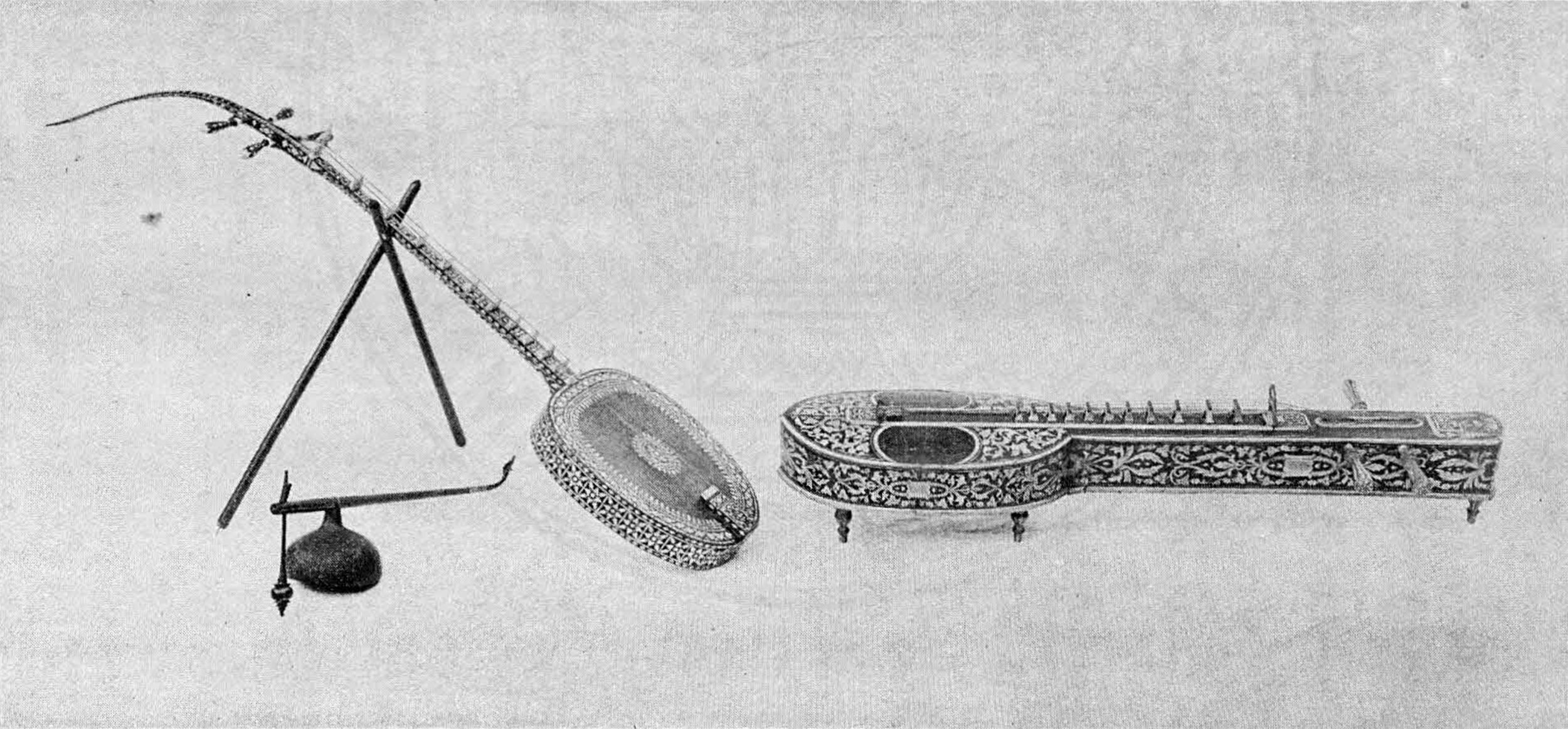
From left to right: phin namtao, krachappi, and chakhe.

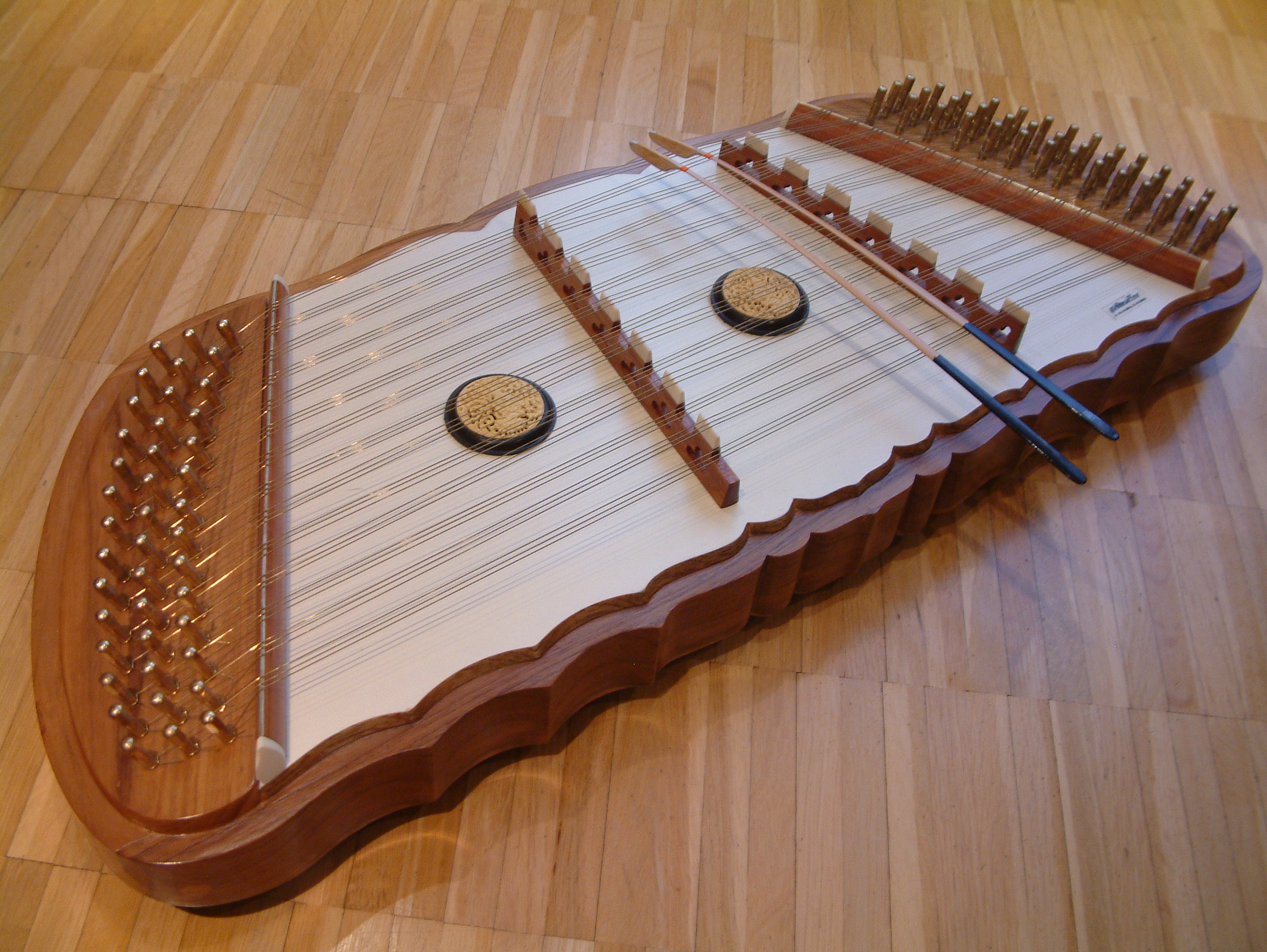
Khim

=== Theatre ===
Traditional Thai theatre includes various forms such as Khon (masked dance-drama), Nang (which encompasses shadow play, including Nang yai and Nang talung), Lakhon (classical dance-drama), Likay (folk theatre), Manora (classical dance-drama), and Hun (puppetry). Each of these forms has its own unique style, costume, and music.

== Entertainment ==
=== Cinema ===
Thailand has a film industry with a rich history dating back to the late 19th century when King Chulalongkorn first encountered movies and cinema equipment during a visit to Switzerland. Since then, Thai cinema has produced a wide range of genres and styles, including horror films about ghosts, spirits, and the supernatural, as well as documentaries, dramas, romance, comedies, and action movies. Major cinema chains in Thailand include Major Cineplex, the largest with more than 828 screens nationwide and overseas, and SF Cinema City among others.

Some of the most celebrated Thai film directors in the industry include Chatrichalerm Yukol, Nonzee Nimibutr, Wisit Sasanatieng, Banjong Pisanthanakun, Pen-Ek Ratanaruang, and Apichatpong Weerasethakul, while actors and actresses such as Ananda Everingham, Mookda Narinrak, Pimchanok Luevisadpaibul, Davika Hoorne, Mario Maurer, Phuwin Tangsakyuen, Naravit Lertratkosum, Nadech Kugimiya, Natapohn Tameeruks, Ranee Campen, Kimberley Anne Woltemas, Patcharapa Chaichua, Araya A. Hargate, Hussawee Pakrapongpisan, Tontawan Tantivejakul, Korapat Kirdpan, Nattawin Wattanagitiphat, James Jirayu, Yaya Urassaya, Vachirawit Chivaaree, Prin Suparat, Yanin Vismitananda, and Tony Jaa have gained both domestic and international fame. Major film studios in Thailand include GDH 559, Sahamongkol Film International, and Five Star Production, with blockbuster films like The Legend of Suriyothai (2001), Ong-Bak: Muay Thai Warrior (2003), Shutter (2004), Pee Mak (2013), Bad Genius (2017), Homestay (2018), and Love Destiny: The Movie (2022). The Suphannahong National Film Awards are the main film awards in the Thai film industry. They are presented annually by the National Federation of Motion Pictures and Contents Associations (MPC), and are named after the Suphannahong, a royal barge whose figurehead is the inspiration for the trophy statuette.

=== Television series ===
Lakorn is a term used in Thailand to refer to television dramas or series. It encompasses a wide range of genres and styles, including romantic dramas, historical dramas, and action series. Lakorn productions often reflect Thai culture through their use of music, dance, and clothing, and explore complex social issues such as family conflicts and star-crossed lovers. Lakorn has become popular not only in Thailand, but also internationally, with shows such as Hormones: The Series (2013–2015), Love Destiny (2018), The Gifted (2018), and Girl From Nowhere (2018–2021), gaining a following overseas.

== Religion ==
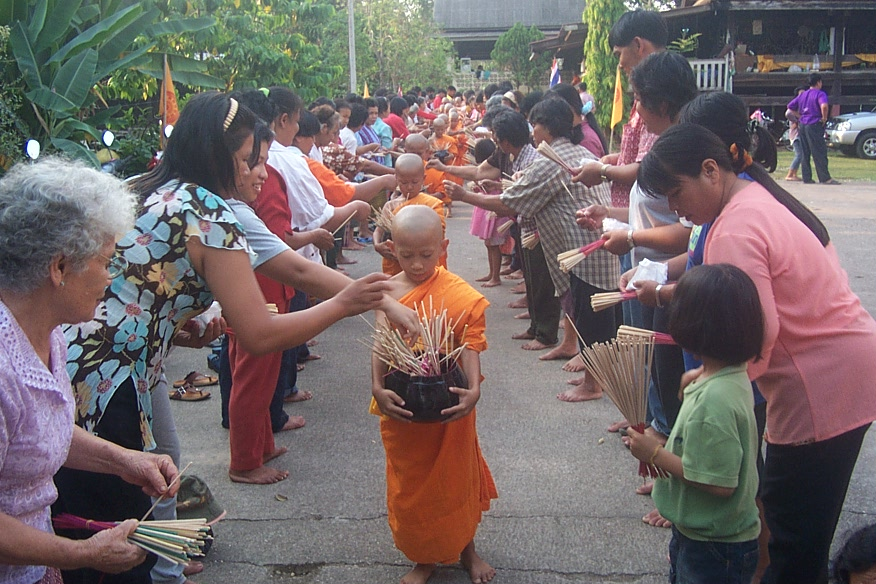
Buddhist novices receiving joss sticks.

Thailand allows freedom of religion unless it threatens the security of the state. The government recognizes Buddhism, Islam, Hinduism, Sikhism, and Christianity, providing subsidies and tax benefits to these groups. The country is predominantly Buddhist (94.6%), followed by Muslims (4.3%), Christians (1%), and followers of other religions. The majority of Buddhists observe the Theravada, which includes the Thai Forest Tradition, Dhammayuttika Nikaya, and Santi Asoke sects, and an unknown minority belong to the Mahayana.

Buddhism in Thailand is strongly influenced by traditional beliefs regarding ancestral and natural spirits, that have been incorporated into Buddhist cosmology. Most Thai people install spirit houses (Thai: ศาลพระภูมิ; RTGS: san phra phum), miniature houses outside their dwellings, where they believe household spirits live. They present offerings of food and drink to these spirits to keep them happy. If these spirits aren't happy, it is believed that they will inhabit the household and cause chaos. These spirit houses can be found in public places and on the streets of Thailand, where the public make offerings.

Prior to the rise of Theravada Buddhism, both Indian Brahminical religion and Mahayana Buddhism were present in Thailand. Influences from both these traditions can still be seen in present-day Thai folklore. Brahminical shrines play an important role in Thai folk religion, and the Mahayana Buddhist influence is reflected in the presence of figures like Lokesvara, a form of the bodhisattva Avalokitesvara sometimes incorporated into Thailand's iconography.

=== Marriage ===
Thai Buddhist marriage ceremonies are generally divided into two parts: a Buddhist component, which includes the recitation of prayers and the offering of food and other gifts to monks and images of the Buddha, and a non-Buddhist component rooted in folk traditions, which centers on the couple's families.

In former times, it was unknown for Buddhist monks to be present at any stage of the marriage ceremony itself. As monks were invited to attend to the dead during funerals, their presence at a marriage (which was associated with fertility, and intended to produce children) was considered a bad omen. A couple would seek a blessing from their local temple before or after being married, and might consult some monks for astrological advice in setting an auspicious date for the wedding. The non-Buddhist portions of the wedding would take place away from the temple, and would often take place on a separate day.

In modern times, these prohibitions have been significantly relaxed. It is not uncommon for a visit to a temple to be made on the same day as the non-Buddhist portions of a wedding, or even for the wedding to take place within the temple. While a division is still commonly observed between the "religious" and "secular" portions of a wedding service, it may be as simple as the monks present for the Buddhist ceremony departing to take lunch once their role is complete.

The Thai bride price system is known as the sin sot (Thai: สินสอด; RTGS: sin sot). It roughly translates to "bride price". The groom will be expected to pay a sum of money to the family, to compensate them for the loss of a daughter and to demonstrate that the groom is financially capable of taking care of their daughter. Bride prices of 50,000 to 300,000 baht have been documented, but bride prices can sometimes run into the tens of millions of baht. In many cases, the bride price is purely symbolic and will be returned to the bride and groom after the wedding has taken place. Whether the practice of sin sot is a tradition or a scam has been debated by critics. One observed, "All that talk of face and argument for cherished tradition? It's a thinly veiled con. Behind that gobbledygook, it's the same old forces of the material world and about the parents getting enough cash to buy a new pickup, pay outstanding debts or acquire something to elevate their status." Actually, in the Thai culture the sin sot is an essential part of the marriage and no man would refuse it to the bride's family.

Khanom Si Thuai is a dessert traditional served at Thai weddings.

=== Funerals ===
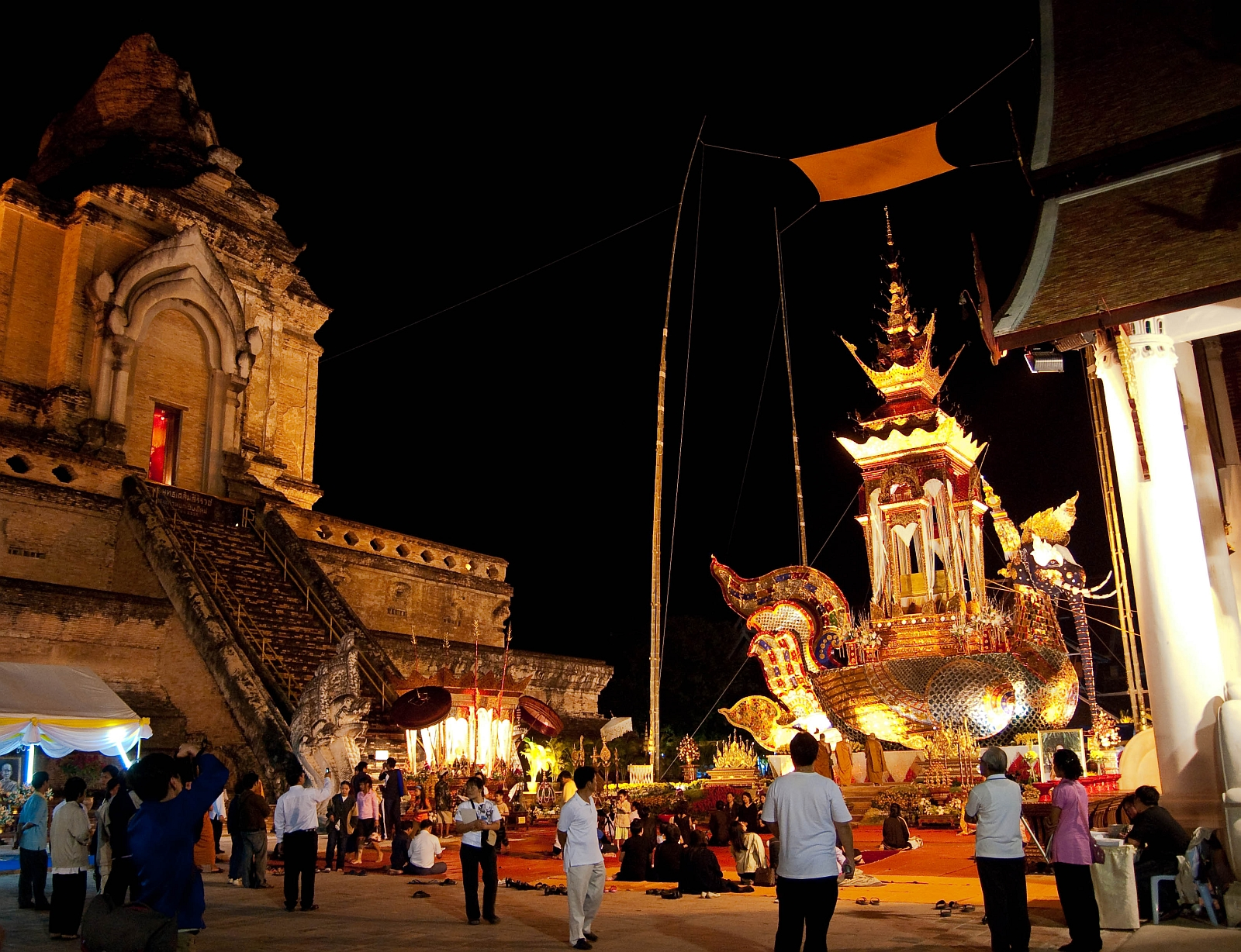
Funeral pyre of Chan Kusalo, the patriarch-abbot of northern Thailand.

Traditionally, Thai funerals last for at least one week and are focused on making merit for the deceased. Activities include distributing Buddhist scriptures, giving gifts to temples, and inviting monks to chant prayers for the deceased's protection. The corpse is cremated, and the urn is kept in a chedi in the local temple. Thai Chinese and Thai Muslim have their own funeral rituals. Pet funerals are also common in Bangkok, with one company cremating up to 400 animals per month.

== Etiquette ==
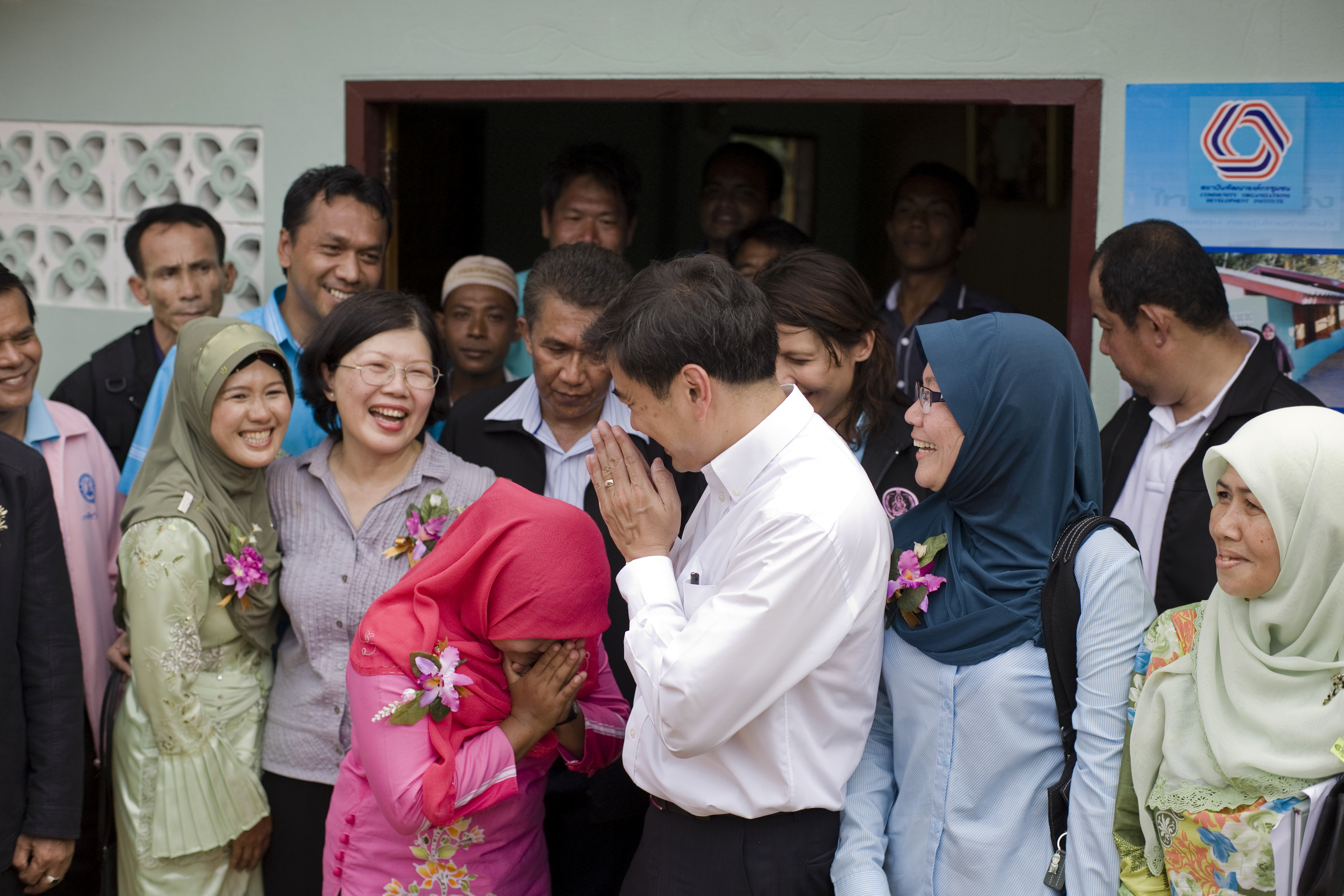
Thai greeting, the smile is an important symbol of refinement in Thai culture.

Thai etiquette was described by Phya Anuman Rajadhon in the 20th century, during a time when modernity changed Thailand and many traditions disappeared. Refinement and avoiding coarseness are highly valued in Thai culture. The wai is a prayer-like gesture used in greetings, leave-taking, acknowledgements, or apologies, varying depending on the relative status. Thais tend to use the ubiquitous phrase mai pen rai (meaning it doesn't matter) to minimize disagreements, mistakes, or misfortunes and avoid conflict. A smile and mai pen rai indicate that the incident is unimportant, and no conflict or shame is involved. The pleasant attitude conveyed through the wai has earned Thailand the nickname land of smiles.

A notable social norm holds that the head is the highest and most respected part of the body, while the feet are considered the lowest and dirtiest. As a result, touching someone's head or pointing/touching something with the feet is rude. Placing one's feet above someone else's head is impolite, especially towards the royal family. When sitting on the ground, Thais point their feet away from others or tuck them to the side/behind them. Public displays of affection are not common in traditional Thai society, especially among lovers, but are becoming more accepted among younger generations.

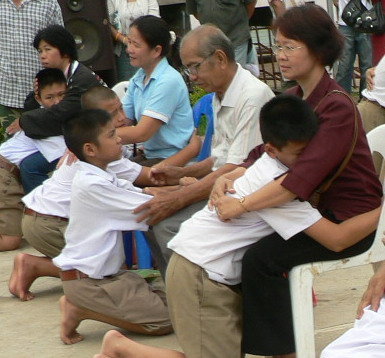
Display of respect of the younger towards the elder is a cornerstone value in Thailand. A family during the Buddhist ceremony for young men who are to be ordained as monks.

Thai culture values serenity and avoids conflict and sudden displays of anger. Visitors should take care not to create conflict and handle disagreements with a smile, without assigning blame. The concept of sanuk emphasizes that life should be fun, and Thais often display positive emotions in social interactions. Respect for hierarchy is essential, and the custom of bun khun highlights indebtedness to parents, guardians, teachers, and caretakers. It involves slow-acting accounting of an exchange based on locally interpreted scales and measures. The bidet shower is common in Thai toilets, as evidenced by an uproar by parliamentarians when it was disclosed that the new parliament building was not equipped with bum guns.

Thai customs regarding monks prohibit physical contact between them and women, leading to various methods being employed to avoid accidental contact. Women make offerings by placing them at the feet of the monk, on a cloth or table, and blessings are applied using the end of a candle or stick. Laypersons are expected to sit or stand with their heads lower than the monk's. Feet should be pointed away from Buddha images in temples, and footwear should be removed before entering homes or sacred areas.

Thai dining etiquette has also been influenced by the introduction of the fork and spoon during the reign of King Rama IV and King Rama V. These utensils have become the norm for dining in Thailand, as they are better suited for eating Thai food than the traditional fork and knife. In addition to using spoons and forks, Thai people also commonly use chopsticks, knives, and their hands to eat, depending on the type of food and the occasion.

=== National anthem and respect for the flag and king ===
Thailand has a daily national anthem played by all media outlets at 08:00 and 18:00, during which Thais pay homage to the flag by standing at attention. Students sing the anthem in front of the flag every school day. The practice originated in 1935 and is now mandated by the Flag Act of 1979, which imposes a fine of up to 2,000 baht and one year imprisonment for not observing the custom. The royal anthem of the King of Thailand is also played before movies, concerts, and sporting events, and everyone is expected to stand.

== Clothing ==
=== Traditional ===
Traditional Thai clothing is called chut thai (Thai: ชุดไทย Thai pronunciation: [tɕʰút.tʰai]) which literally means "Thai outfit". It can be worn by men, women, and children. Chut thai for women usually consists of a pha nung or a chong kraben, a blouse, and a sabai. Northern and northeastern women may wear a sinh instead of a pha nung and an ancient Khmer chong kraben pant-like with either a blouse or a suea pat. Chut thai for men includes a chong kraben or pants, a Raj pattern shirt, with optional knee-length white socks, and a sabai. Chut thai for northern Thai men is composed of a sado, a white Manchu styled jacket, and sometimes a khian hua. In formal occasions, people may choose to wear a so-called formal Thai national costume.

=== Uniforms ===
Thailand is a uniform-wearing society. From elementary school to university, school uniforms in Thailand are the norm, with few exceptions. Teachers at elementary and secondary levels wear uniforms, usually once a week. All civil servants up to ministerial level have uniforms appropriate to their organization and rank and wear them regularly.

== Cuisine ==
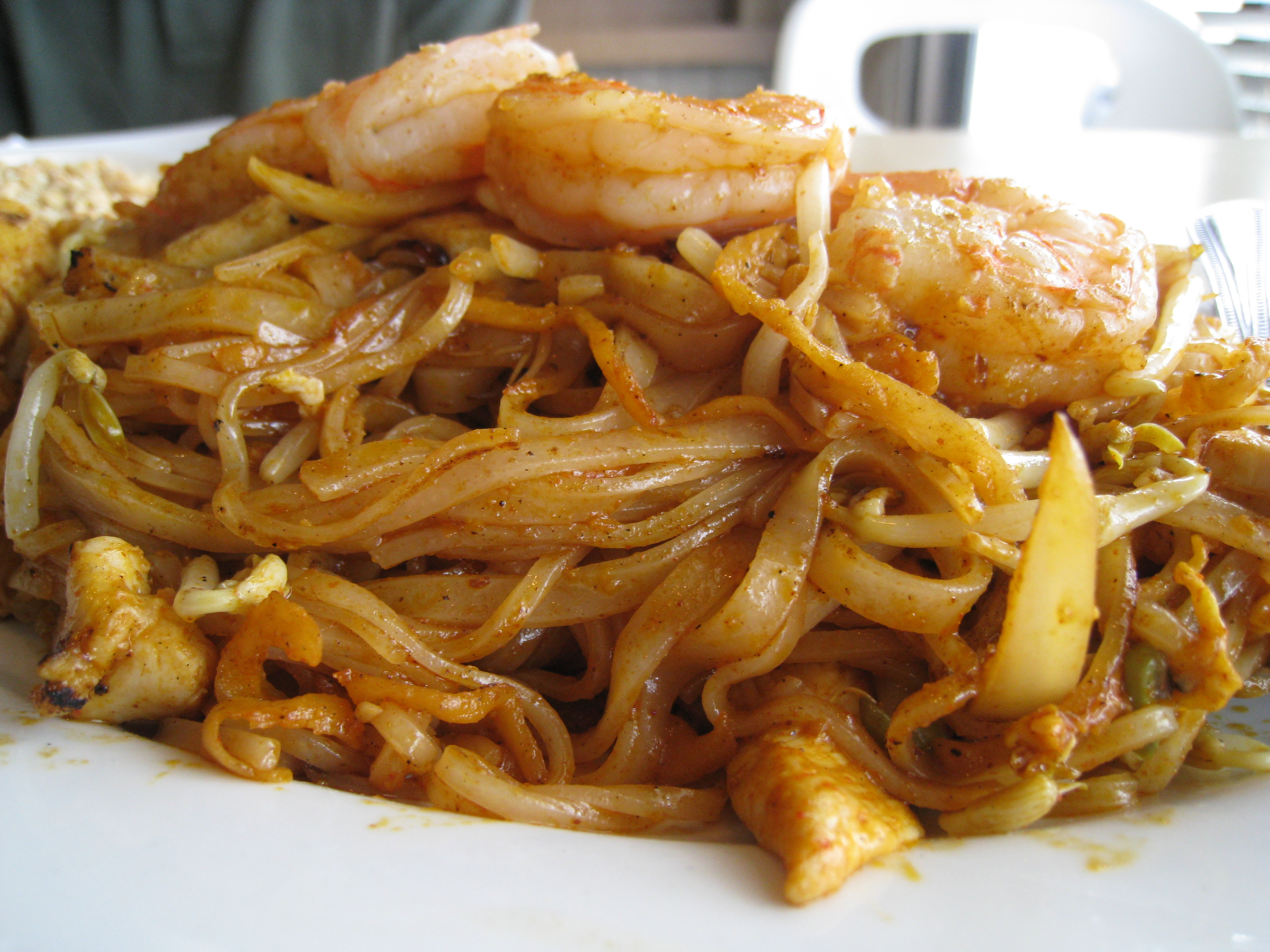
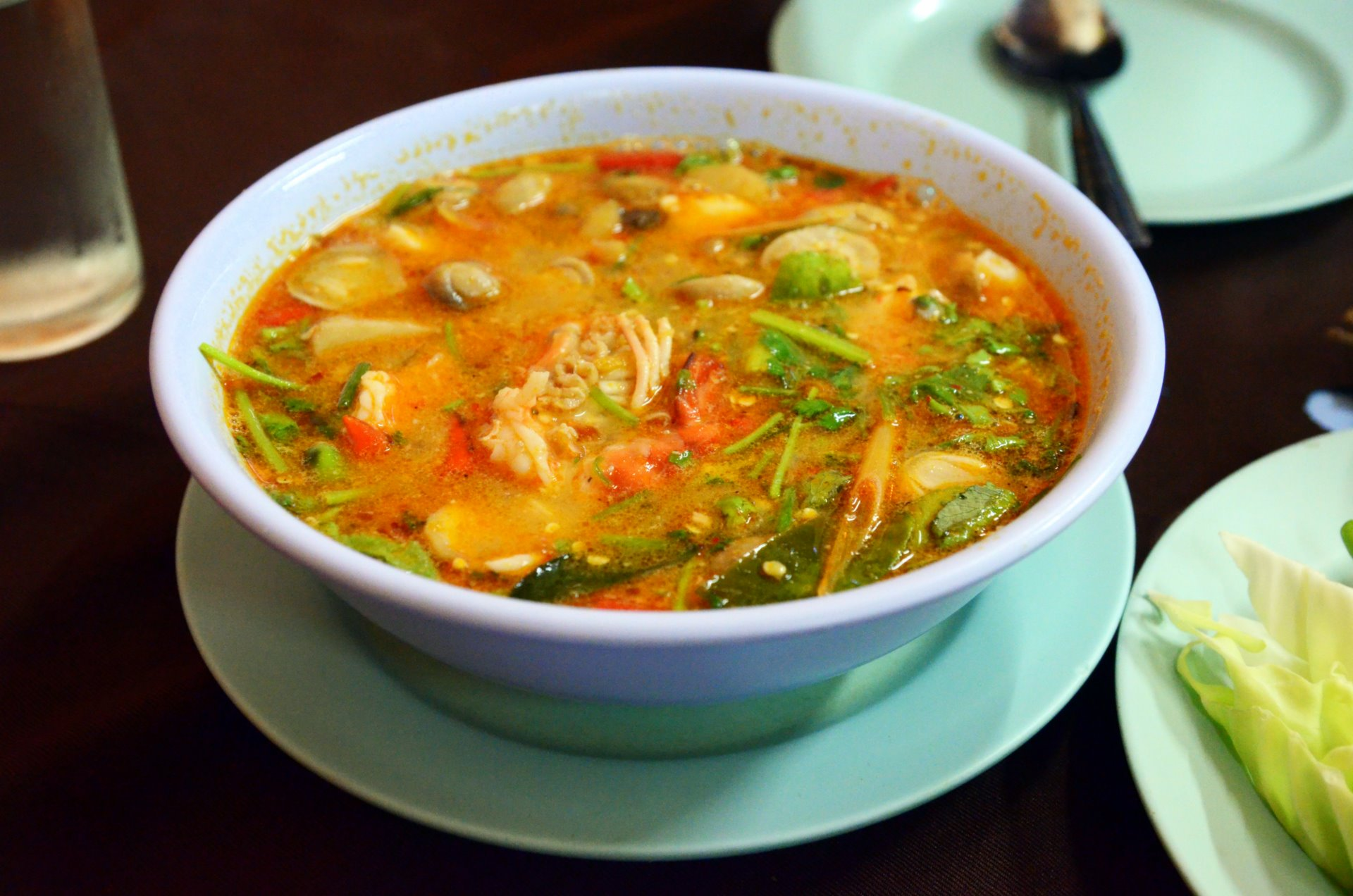
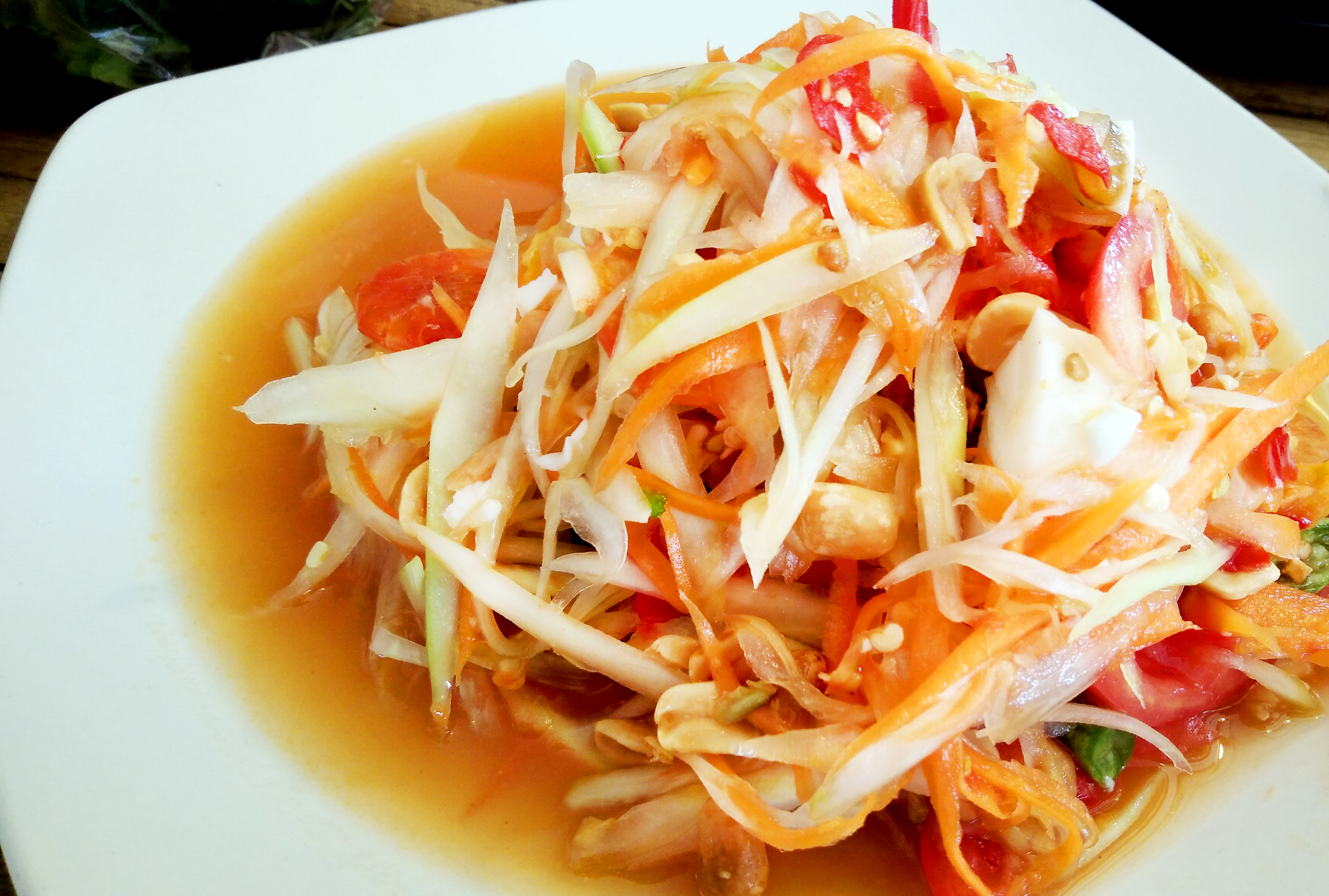
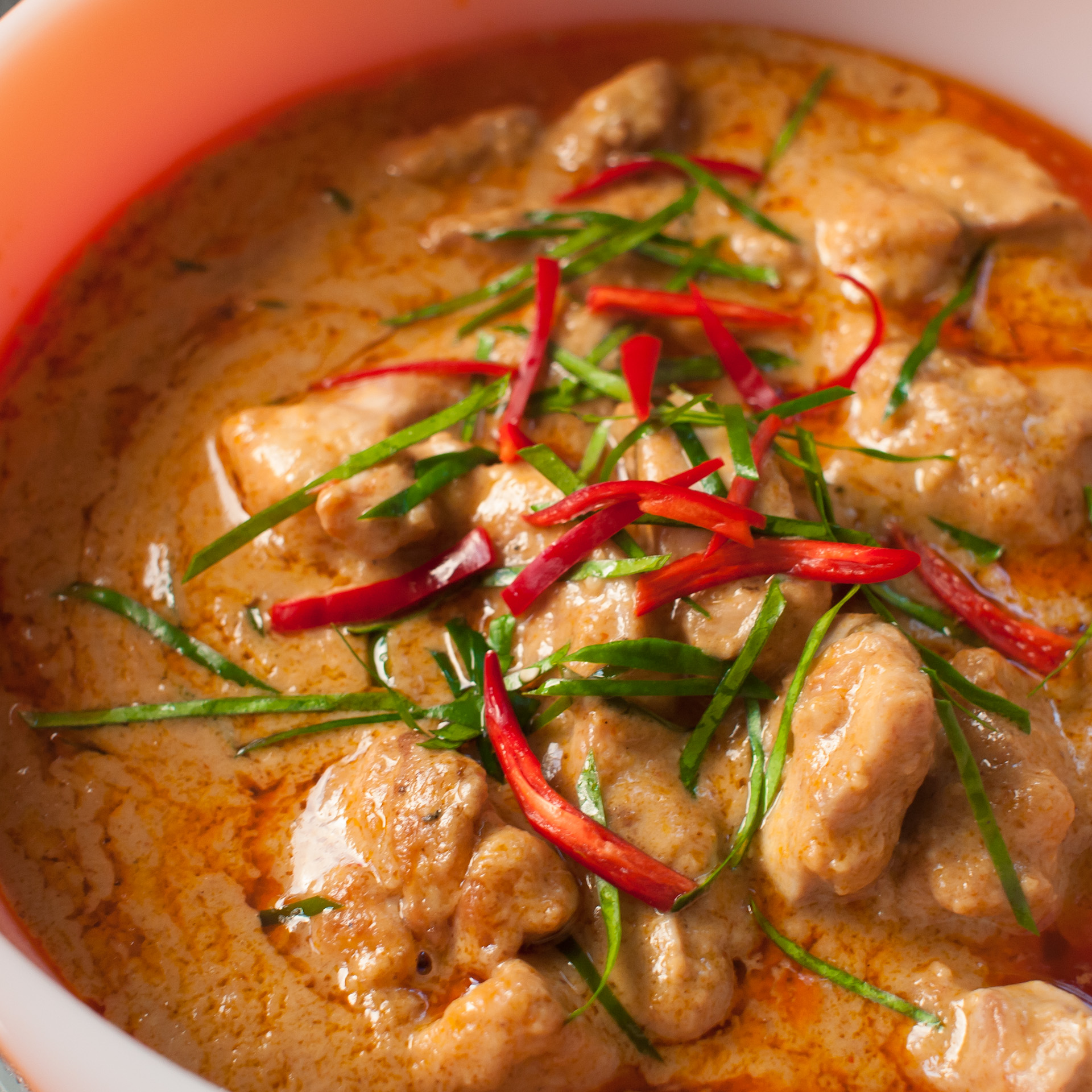
Clockwise from top left: Pad Thai, Tom yam, Som tam and Kaeng phanaeng.

Thai cuisine is known for its diverse range of dishes, which include spicy salads, soups, curries, stir-fries, and desserts. The flavors in Thai cuisine are balanced and often incorporate sweet, sour, salty, bitter, and spicy elements. The most common ingredients used in Thai cooking are fresh herbs and spices, such as lemongrass, ginger, garlic, and chili peppers, as well as fish sauce, coconut milk, and palm sugar. Thai cuisine varies across regions, with dishes influenced by local traditions and ingredient availability. In central Thailand, sticky rice is not commonly used as a staple food but is instead used in desserts, such as mango sticky rice, custard sticky rice, durian sticky rice, etc., which are often made with coconut milk/cream. However, it is still commonly served as a side dish with savory dishes like Gai yang (grilled chicken). The combination of Gai yang and sticky rice is a popular in Thailand, often served with a spicy dipping sauce and a side salad. Therefore, sticky rice is not exclusively a dessert but can also be served as a side dish.

Thai cuisine has evolved over time due to influences from various cultures. Persian traders introduced curry dishes and Muslim cooking styles, while Portuguese missionaries introduced chilies and other New World crops. Chinese immigrants brought stir-frying techniques and noodles. Over the past decade, Thai cuisine has gained global recognition, with over 11,800 Thai restaurants reported overseas in 2007. The Thai government's Kitchen of the World campaign has further boosted the growing Thai food business.

Thai cuisine can be broadly categorized into four types of dishes: Tom (boiled dishes), Yam (spicy salads), Tam (pounded foods), and Kaeng (curries). Some cooking techniques, such as deep-frying, stir-frying, and steaming, are influenced by Chinese cuisine. Popular Thai dishes include Tom yum (spicy soup), Pad thai (stir-fried noodles), Som tam (green papaya salad), Kaeng keow wan gai (green curry chicken), Massaman curry (beef curry), and Pad see ew (stir-fried noodles), Kaeng phanaeng (Panang curry), Tom kha (coconut soup), Pad kaphrao (stir-fried Thai basil chicken), Rad na (stir-fried noodles in gravy), Kuai tiao (noodle soup), and Mu kratha (Thai hotpot).

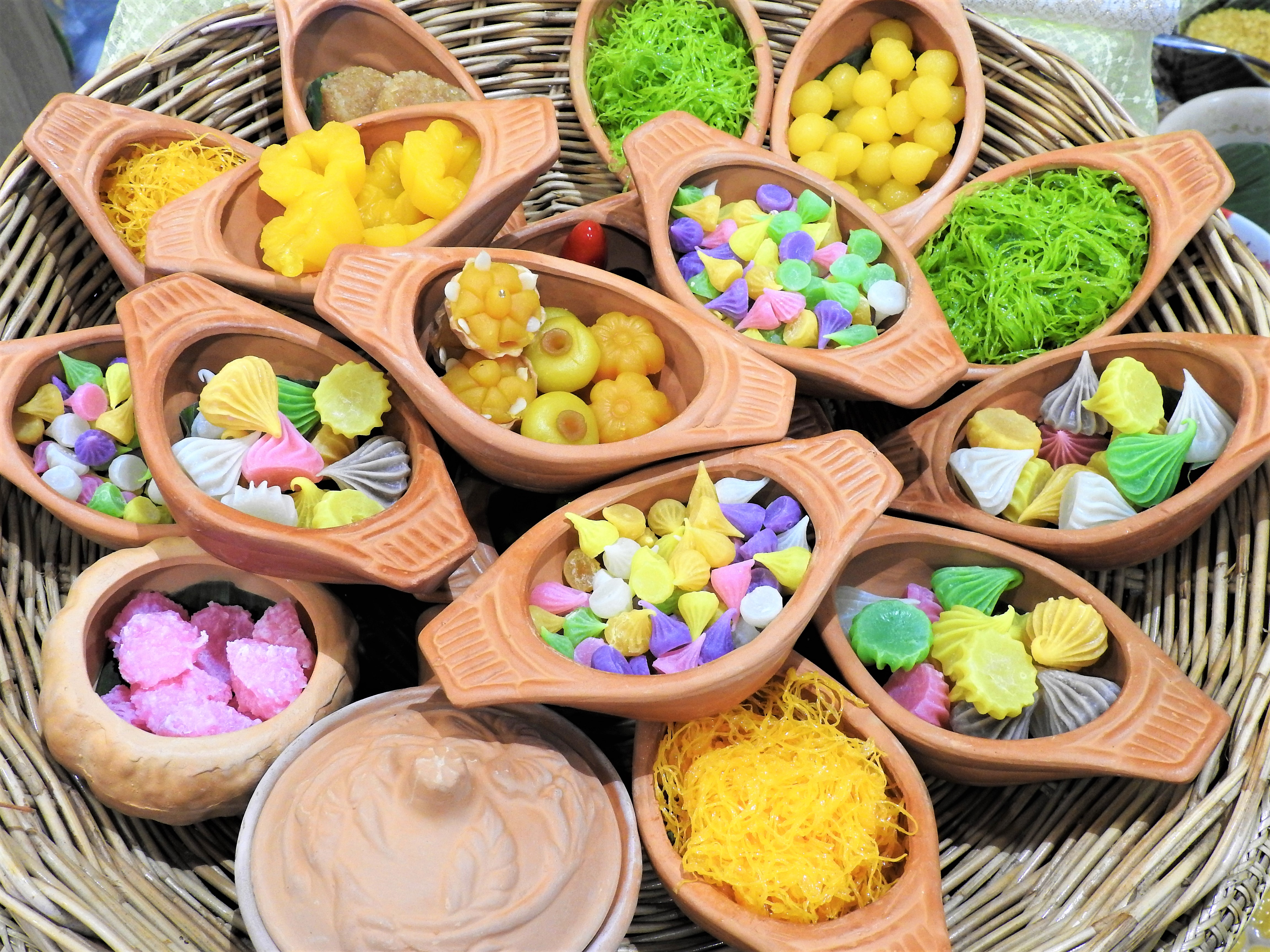
Traditional Thai desserts

Thai desserts are also popular and feature a variety of sweet treats, such as Khanom chan (layered pudding), Khanom mo kaeng (mung bean cake), Sangkhaya fak thong (pumpkin custard), Khanom thuai (coconut cream jelly), Khanom krok (coconut-rice pancakes), Khanom bueang (crispy pancakes), Khanom tan (palm cake), Khanom farang kudi chin (Portuguese influenced cake), Thong yip (pinched gold egg yolks), Thong yod (drop of gold egg yolks), Foi thong (golden threads egg yolks), Lod chong (pandan noodles in coconut milk), Ruam mit (mixed ingredients in coconut milk), Tako (coconut pudding with jasmine scent), Wun (agar jelly), Tub tim krob (water chestnuts in coconut milk), Chaokuai (Grass jelly), Namkhaeng sai (shaved ice dessert with syrup), Khao niao mamuang (sticky rice with mango), Khao niao sangkhaya (sticky rice with custard), Khao niao nakrachik (sticky rice with caramlized) and Khao niao durian (sticky rice with durian).

Thai cuisine also features a range of sauces and condiments, such as Nam chim (dipping sauce), Nam phrik (chilli sauce), Nam pla (fish sauce), and Pla ra (fermented fish). These sauces are used to enhance the flavors of various dishes, such as fried rice, noodles, soups, salads, and grilled meats.

Cuisines of Thailand

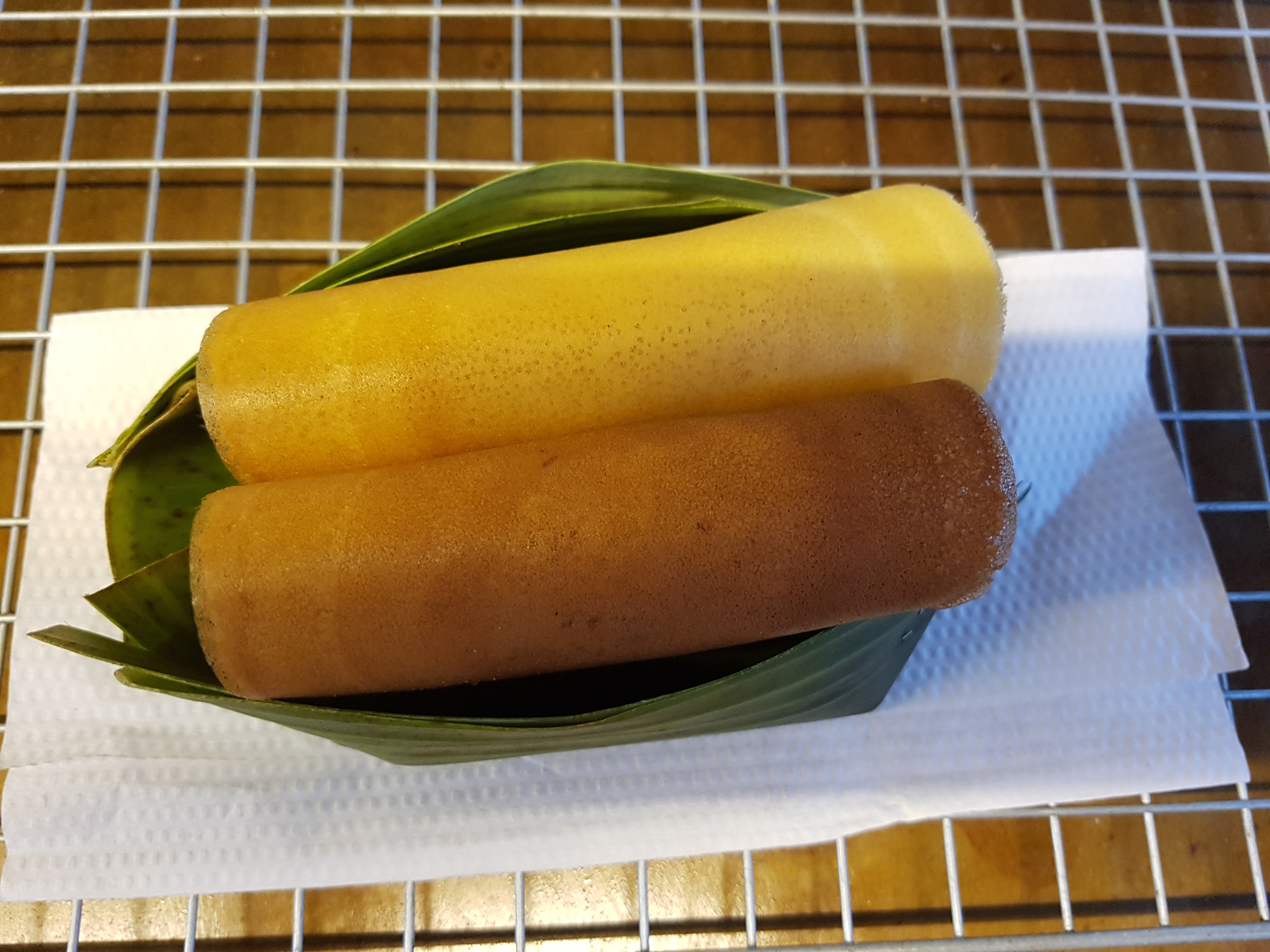
Khanom tokyo

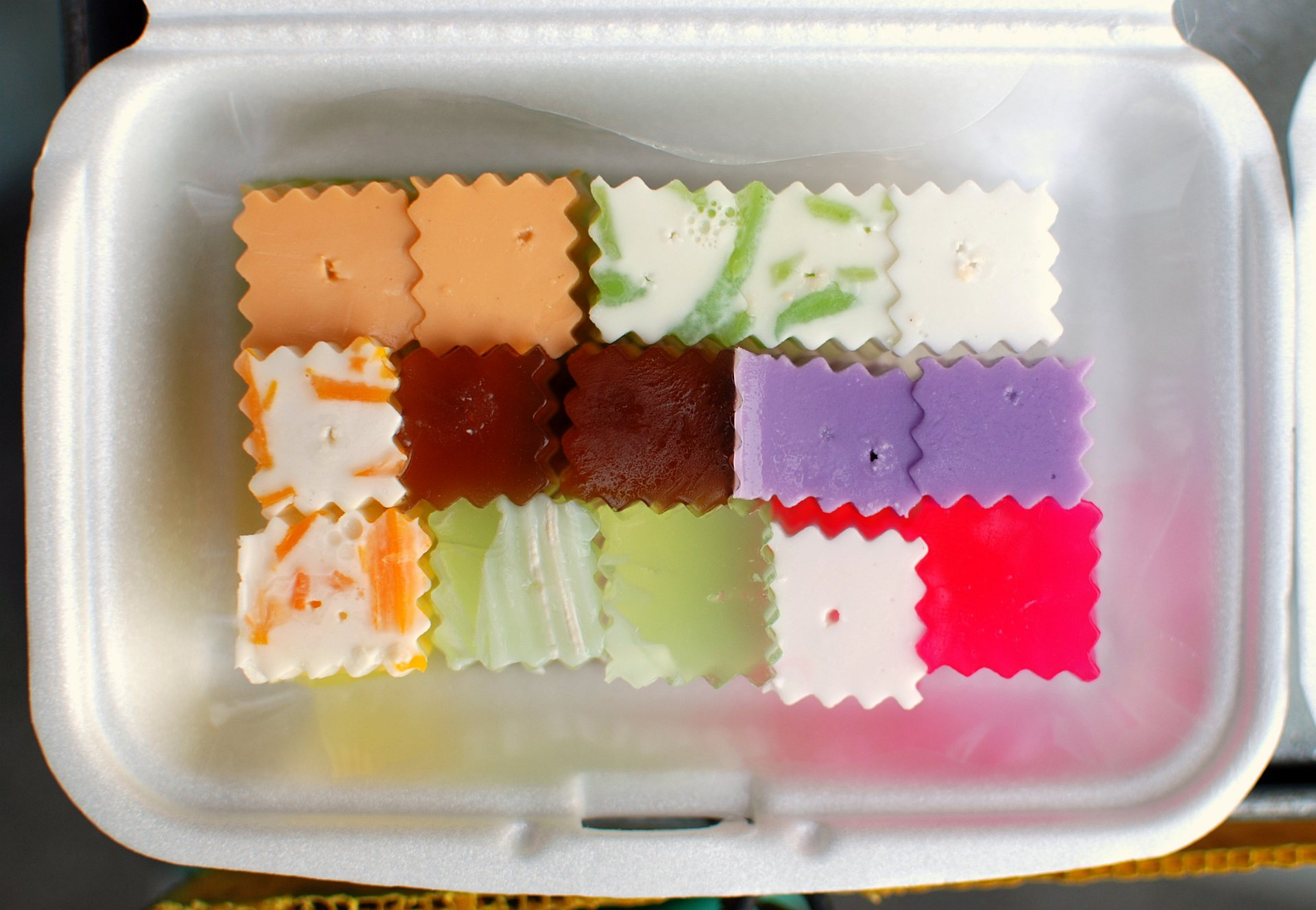
Khanom wun

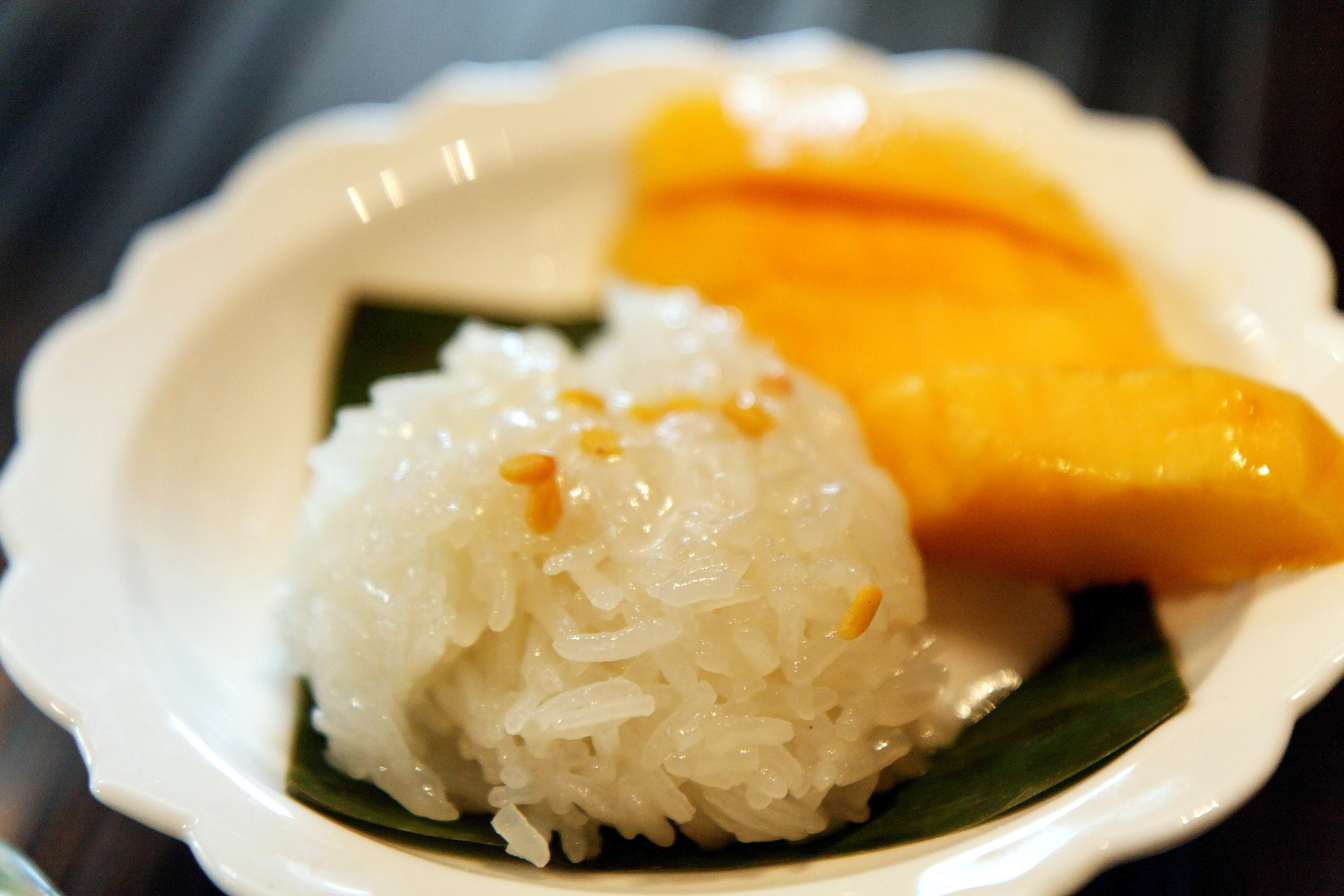
Khao niao mamuang

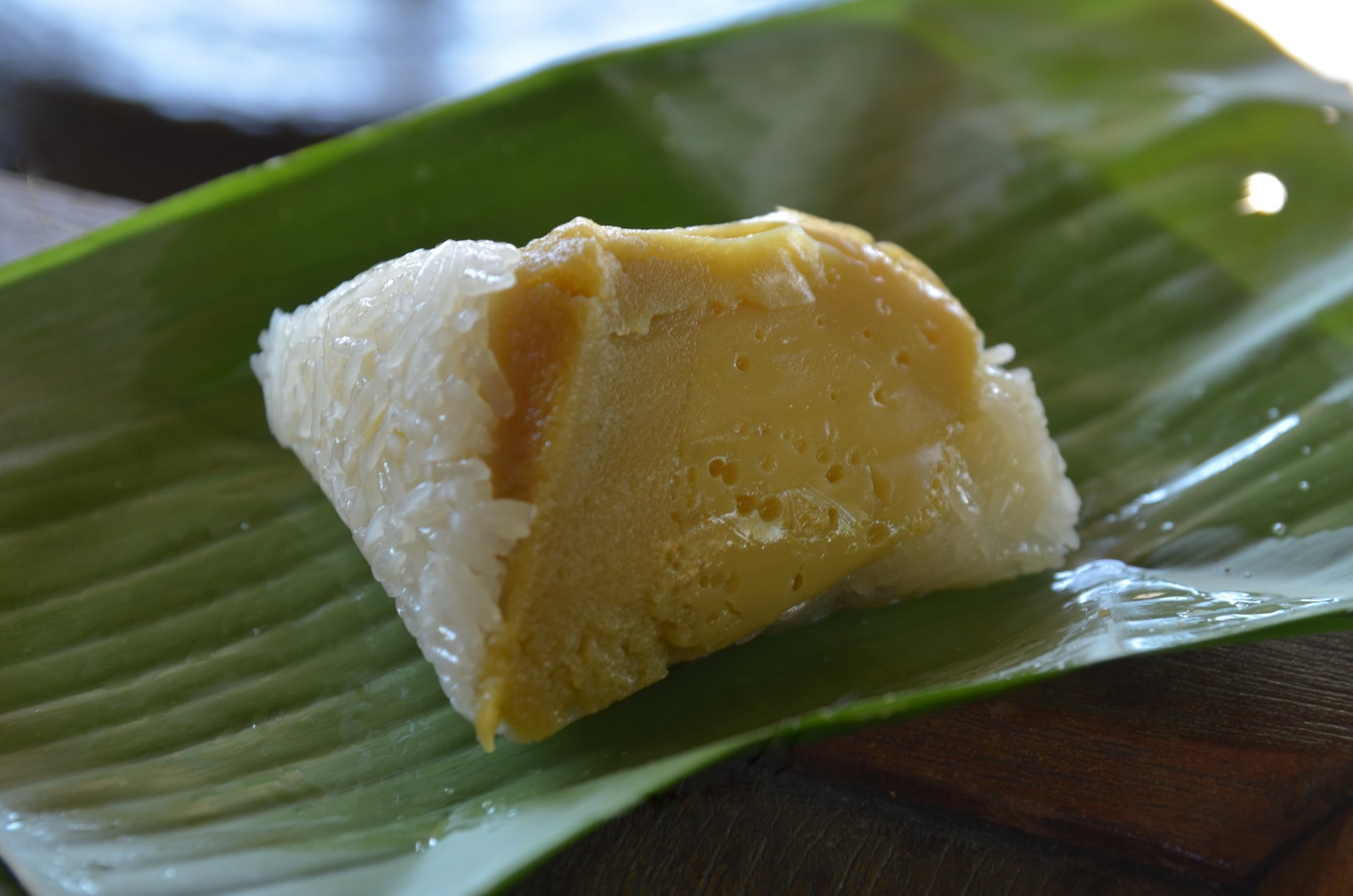
Khao niao sangkhaya

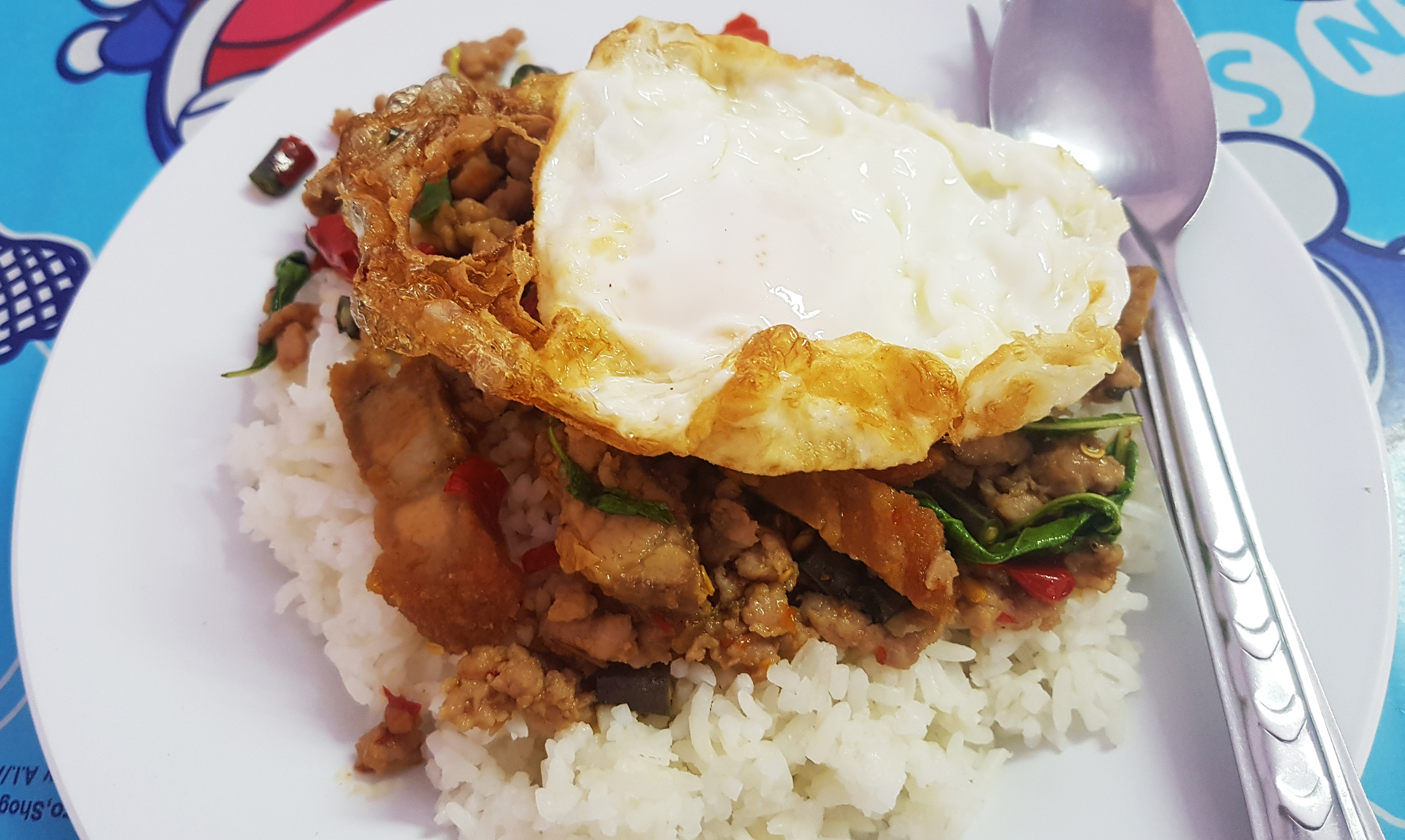
Pad kaphrao

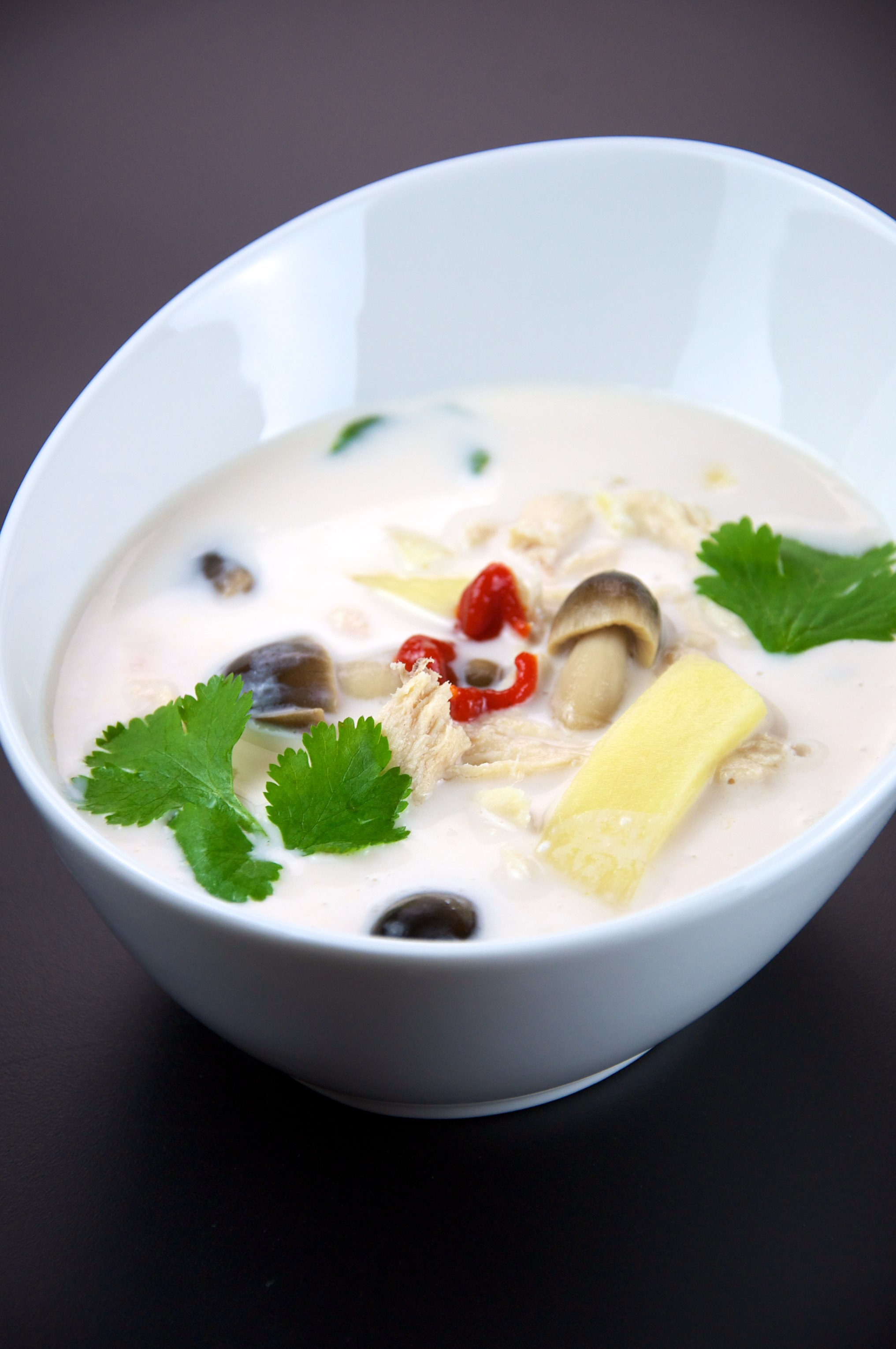
Tom kha

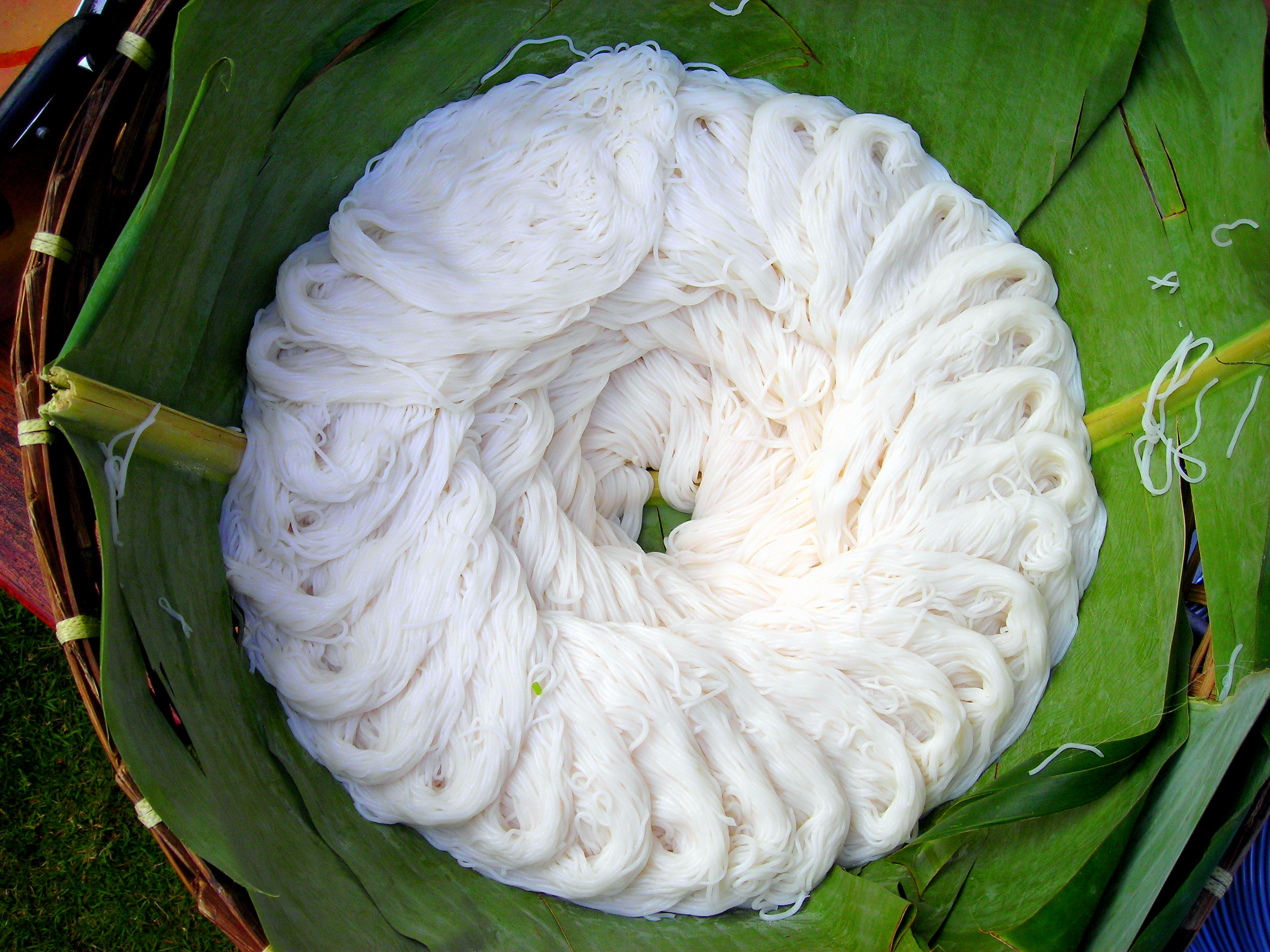
Khanom chin

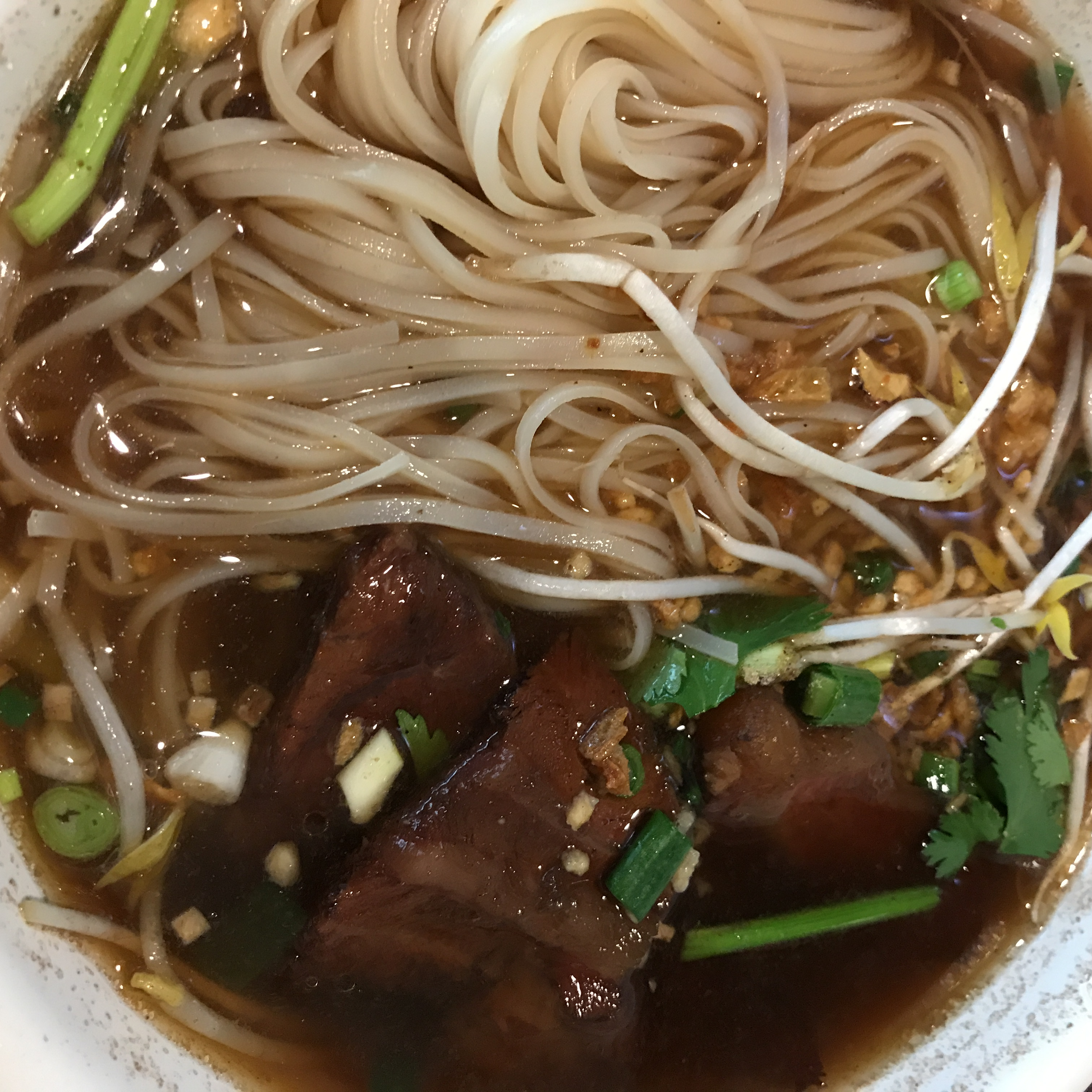
Kuai tiao nuea

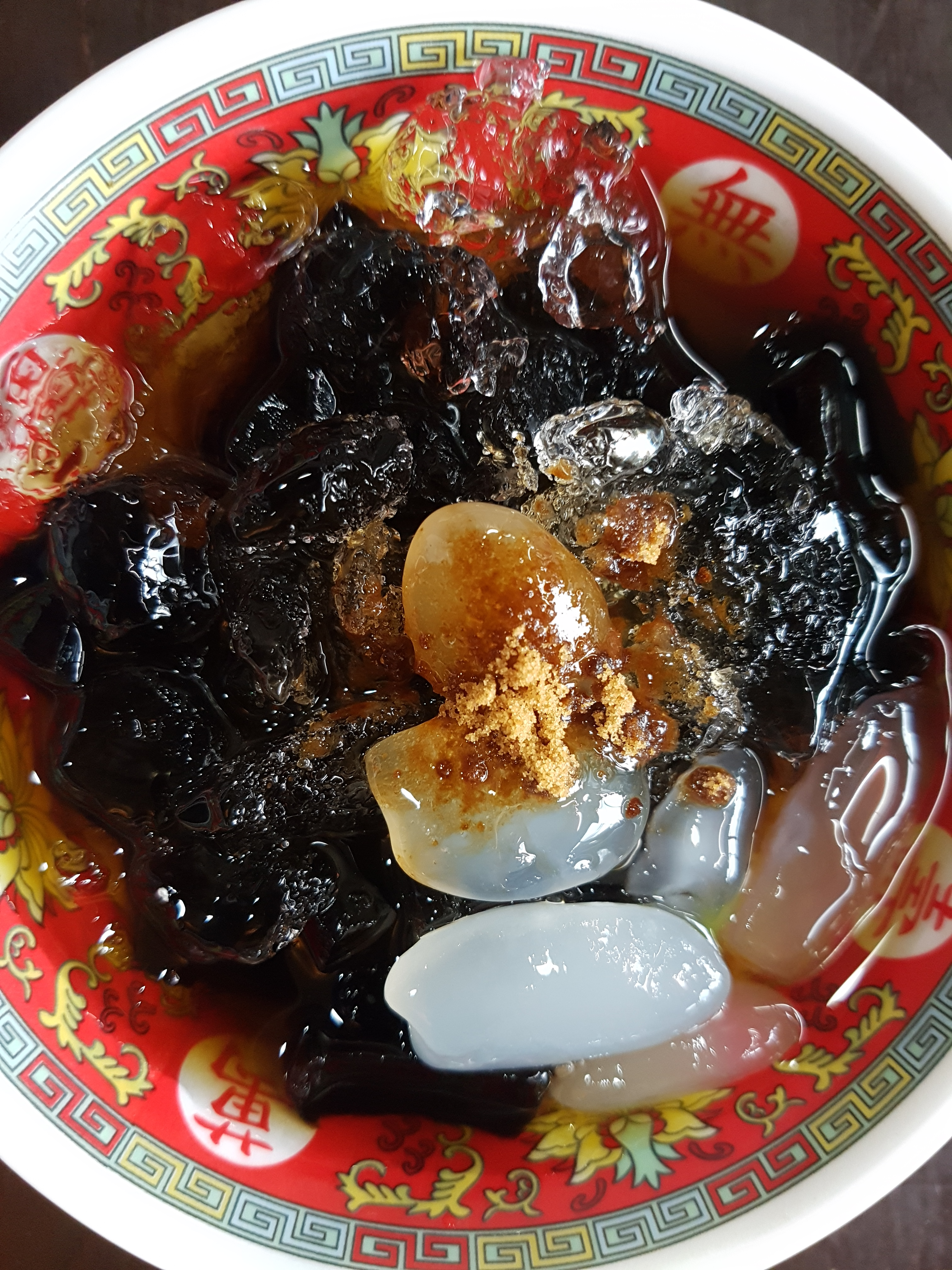
Chaokuai

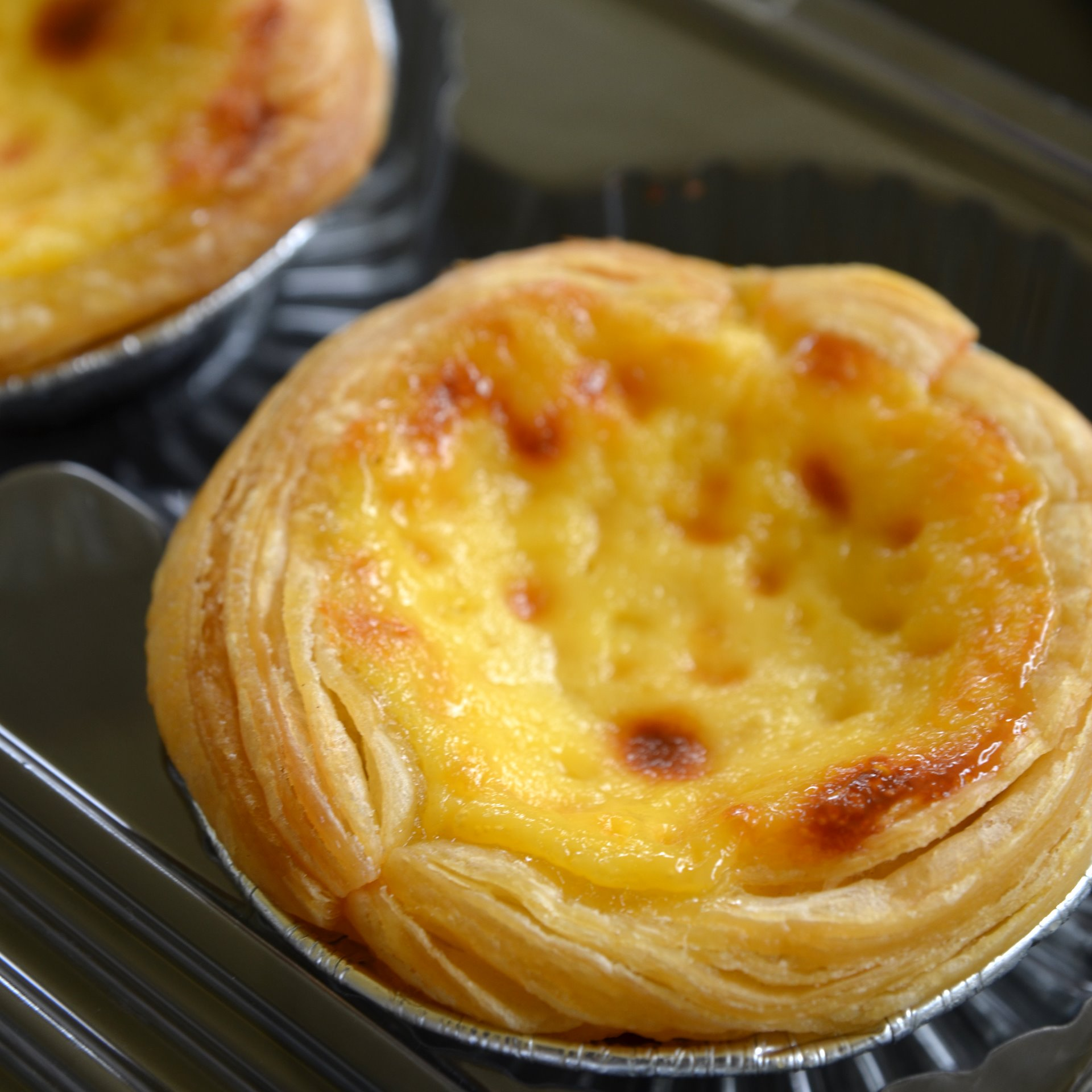
Thad khai

=== Drinks ===
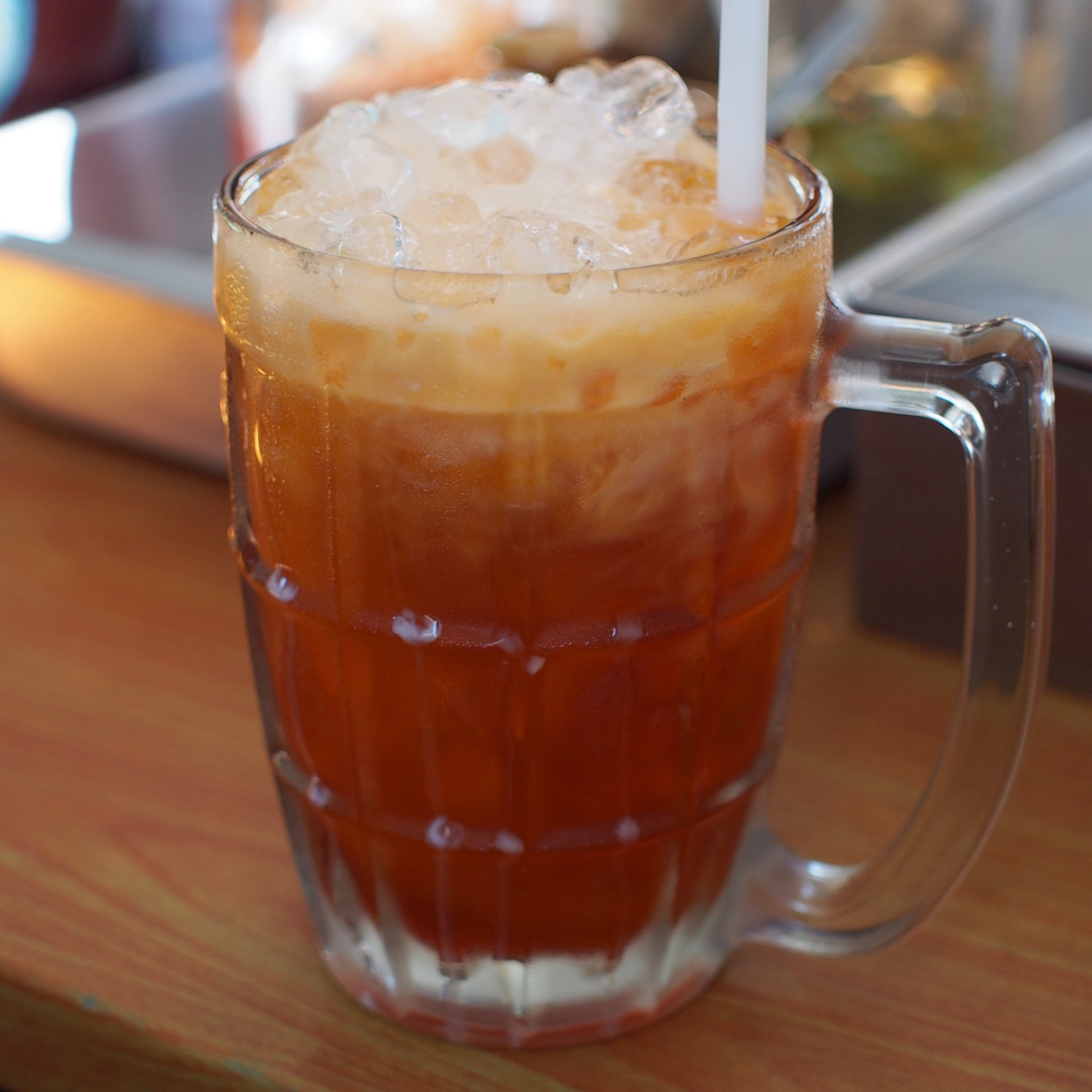
Cha yen, a Thai iced tea

Thai iced tea, Oliang, and Nom yen are popular drinks in Thailand, often sweetened with condensed milk and flavored with cardamom or syrup. Krating Daeng (Red Bull), M-150, and Carabao Daeng are popular energy drinks. There are a wide variety of alcoholic drinks in Thailand, including Mekhong whisky, SangSom, Lao khao, and Sato, etc. Singha and Chang are popular Thai beers, with Singha being the most popular.

== Language ==
=== Names ===
Thai people typically have one or occasionally more short nicknames (Thai: ชื่อเล่น playing name) that they use with friends and family. These nicknames are overwhelmingly one syllable and were traditionally based on animals, fruits, colors, and nature. Nowadays, Thai nicknames tend to be more complex, with an increase in syllables and the addition of foreign influences.

== Sports ==
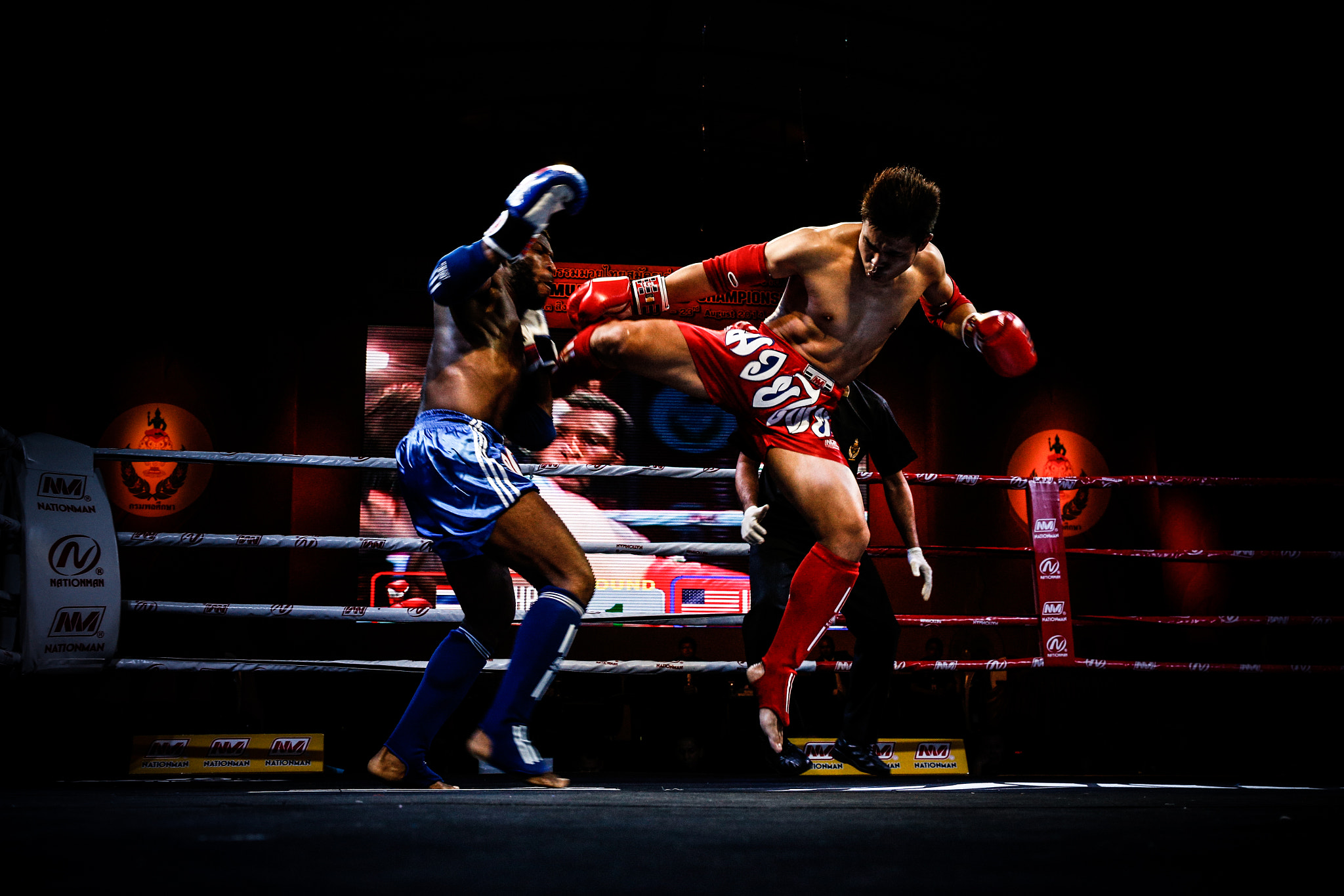
Muay Thai match in Bangkok, Thailand

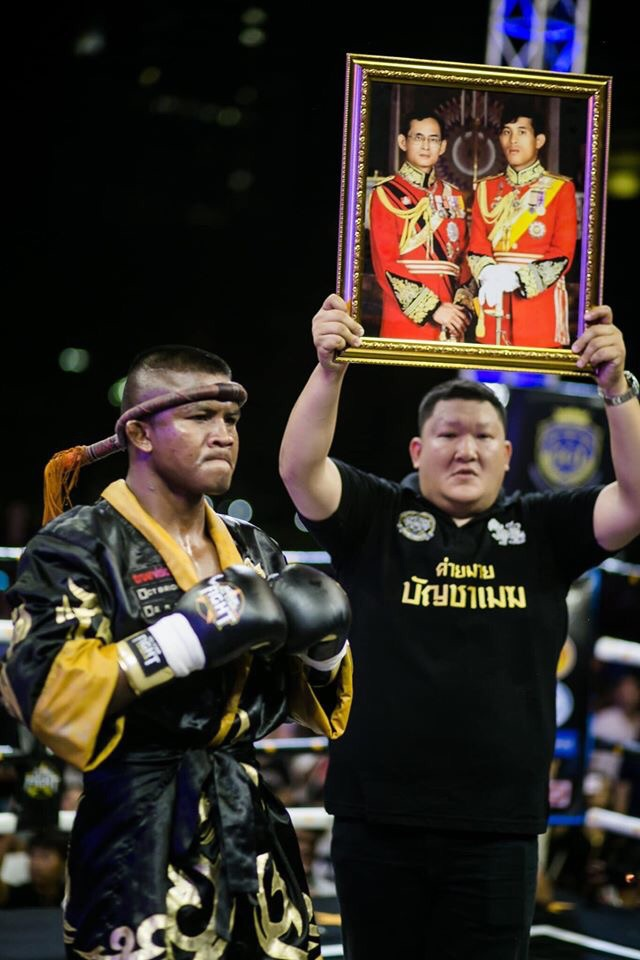
Buakaw Banchamek, a famous Muay Thai fighter

Association football and Futsal are the most popular sports in Thailand for both spectators and players. Muay Thai, a combat sport, is recognized as a national sport and is gaining popularity worldwide. It incorporates kicks, punches, knees, and elbow strikes in a ring with gloves similar to those used in Western boxing, and this has led to Thailand gaining medals at the Olympic Games in boxing. Takraw, one of the two national sports, officially known as Sepak takraw, is a sport similar to volleyball but played with the legs. Other popular sports include badminton, volleyball, motorsports, athletics, cycling, swimming, golf, and basketball. Traditional sports such as long-tail boat racing, long boat racing, makruk, krabi krabong, and dab Thai are still preserved. Thailand has been the most successful Southeast Asian country in the SEA Games, Asian Games, and Olympics, demonstrating the country's strong sports culture.

== Holidays ==
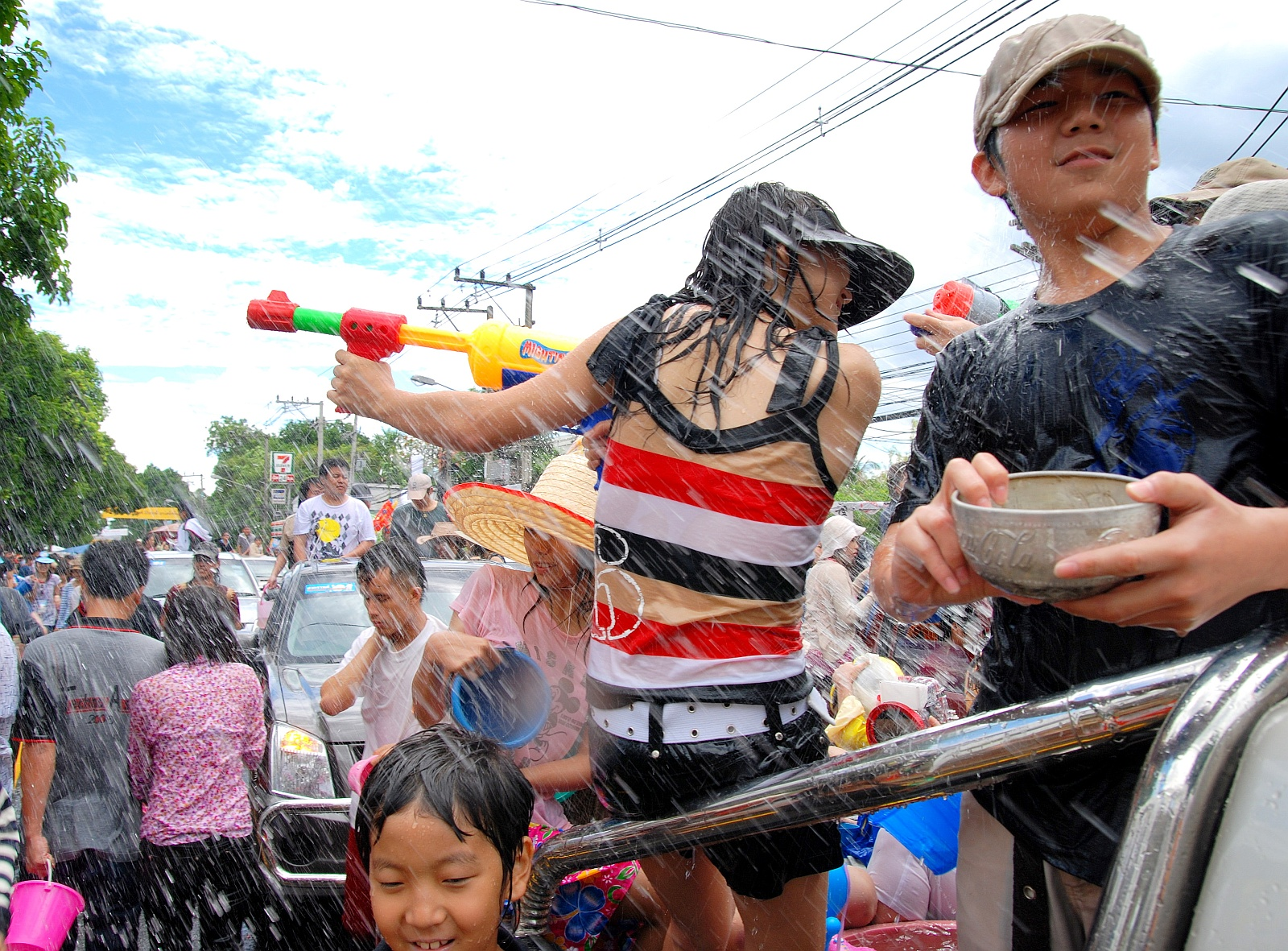
The roads along the old moat of Chiang Mai are full of vehicles during the Songkran water splashing festival.

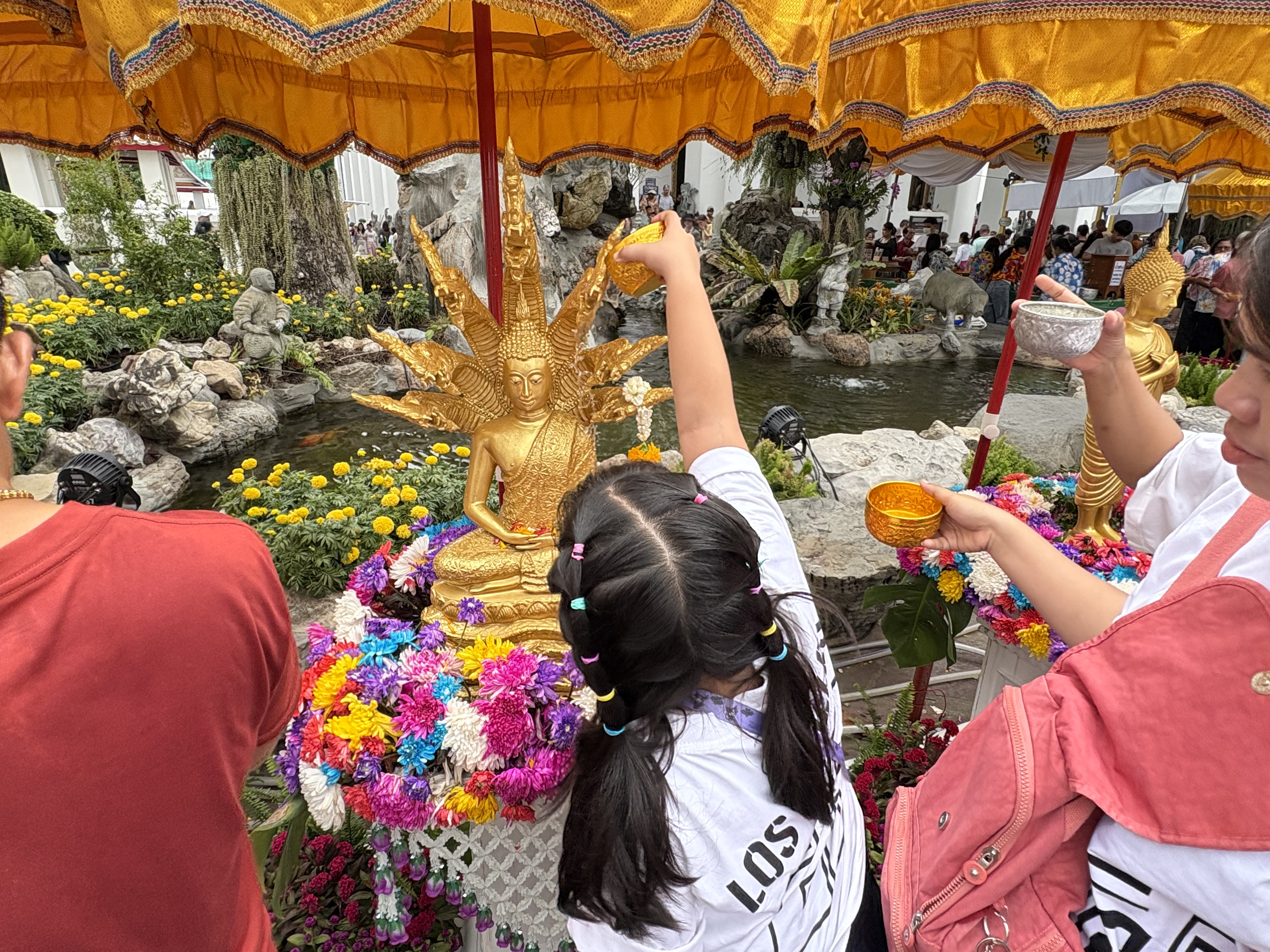
Thai student participating in a ritual bathing of a Buddha statue at a temple

Important holidays in Thai culture include Songkran, the traditional Thai New Year festival, based on the Thai lunisolar calendar, which is celebrated annually from 13 to 15 April. The festival falls at the end of the dry season and during the hot season in Thailand, and in some parts of Thailand, it can last up to a week. In recent decades, especially in major cities, the festival has rapidly expanded and commercialised to attract tourists. Common sights in contemporary water fights are hoses, water barrels, squirt guns, water-filled surgical tubing, and marl clay applied on the face and body, known in Thai as Din Sor Pong (Thai: ดินสอพอง). An integral part of Songkran's many traditions is Rod Nam Dam Hua (Thai: รดน้ำดำหัว), literally, "pouring water to wash the head", a cleansing ritual in which the hands of elders are washed using jasmine-scented water with rose petals in order to express gratitude, wash away misfortune, and welcome blessings. Scented water is also used to wash Buddha images, in a ritual called Song Nam Phra (Thai: สรงน้ำพระ) or "bathing the Buddha". Small statues can be found in temples, homes, and public spaces like malls for bathing during the Songkran season. Songkran is a period of Buddhist merit-making, and common merit-building activities such as giving alms to Buddhist monks, cleaning homes or public spaces, releasing animals and building sand stupas are also highly popular during the holiday.

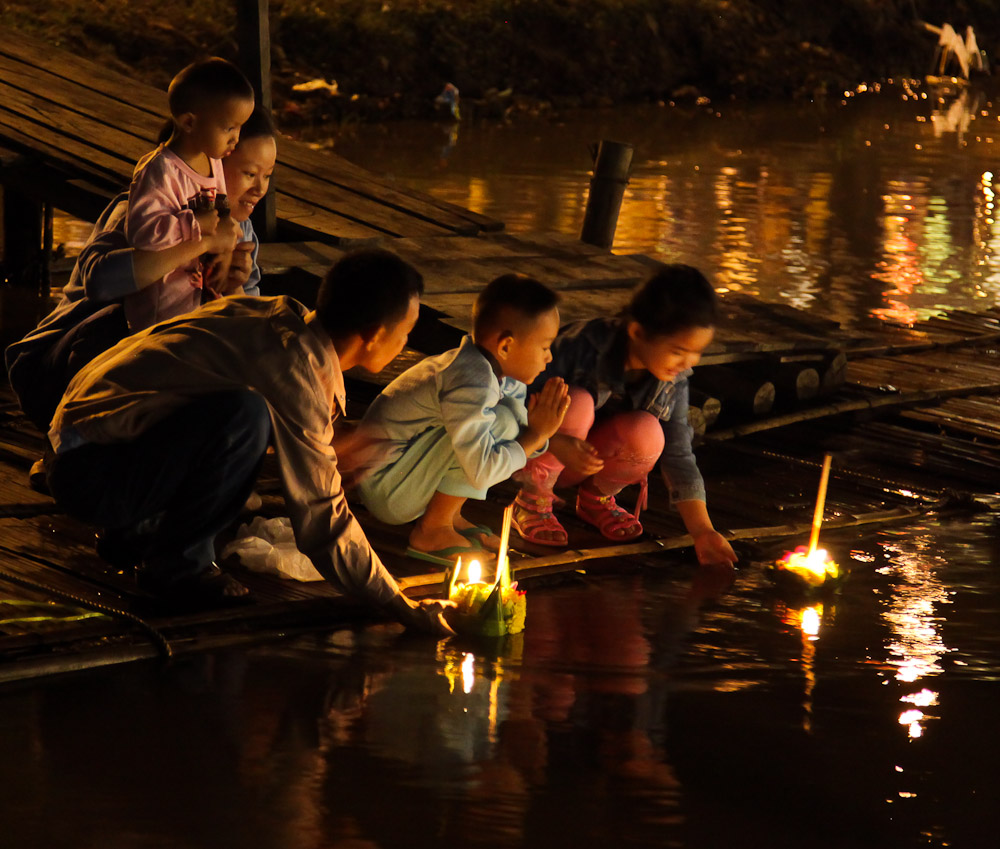
People floating krathong rafts during the Loi Krathong festival in Chiang Mai, Thailand

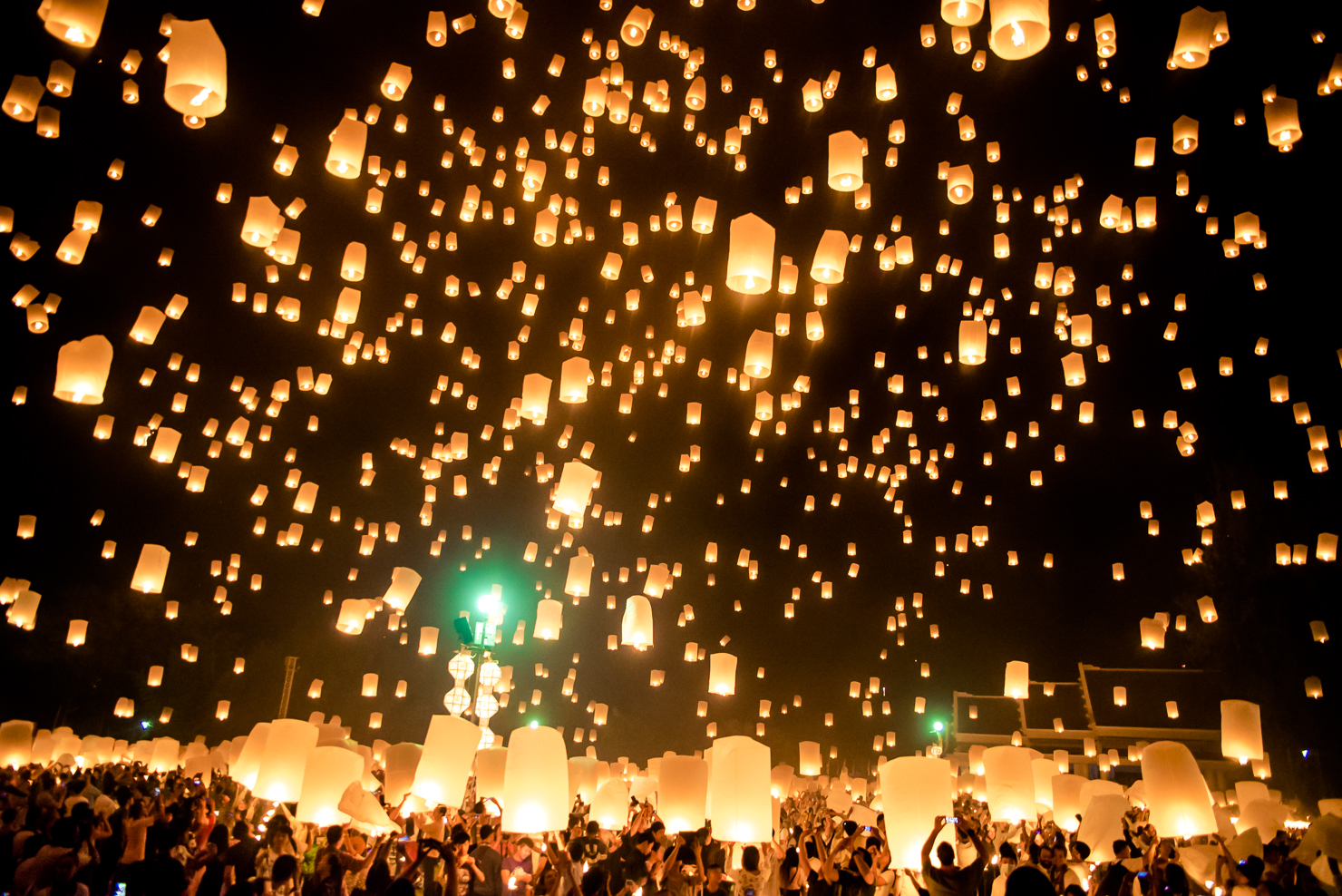
Yi Peng, floating lantern festival in Northern Thailand, observed around the same time as Loy Krathong.

Loy Krathong is another important festival celebrated on the full moon of the 12th lunar month, which usually falls in November. Loy means to float and a Krathong is a handmade small bowl traditionally made from banana leaves and a section of banana tree trunk. The bowl is decorated with folded (origami) banana leaves, flowers, candles, and incense sticks. During the Loy Krathong night, the moon shines brightly, and the river looks calm. It is a scenic beauty with Krathongs floating on the river. Fireworks are lit as a part of celebration and the act of worship. Yipeng, also known as the Lantern Festival, is another festival celebrated in Northern Thailand around the same time as Loy Krathong. During Yipeng, people release floating lanterns into the sky and make wishes as the lanterns rise into the night. Both Loy Krathong and Yipeng are celebrations of light and symbolize letting go of negative emotions and starting anew.

National Elephant Day or Chang Thai Day is a holiday in Thailand, held on 13 March, which celebrates the cultural and historical significance of the elephant in Thailand.

== National symbols ==
The national symbols of Thailand play an important role in representing the country's culture and heritage, and are widely recognized and revered by the Thai people. The official symbols of Thailand include the Thai flag, the national emblem featuring Krut, the Thai National Anthem, and three symbols declared in 2001, the Ratchaphruek or golden shower tree as the national flower, the Thai elephant as the national animal, and Sala Thai, national architecture. Three works of literature have been declared as national literature: Triphumikatha in 2010, Ramakien in 2015, and Mahachat Kham Luang in 2022.

Other national symbols of Thailand include the Siamese fireback, declared as the national bird in 1985; the Siamese fighting fish, declared as the national aquatic animal in 2019; and the Phaya Nak, declared as the national mythological creature on 1 November 2022.

Unofficial symbols of Thailand include the Siamese cat, known for its distinctive appearance and personality, and traditional sports such as Muay Thai and Takraw, widely recognized and celebrated as national sports.

National symbols of Thailand

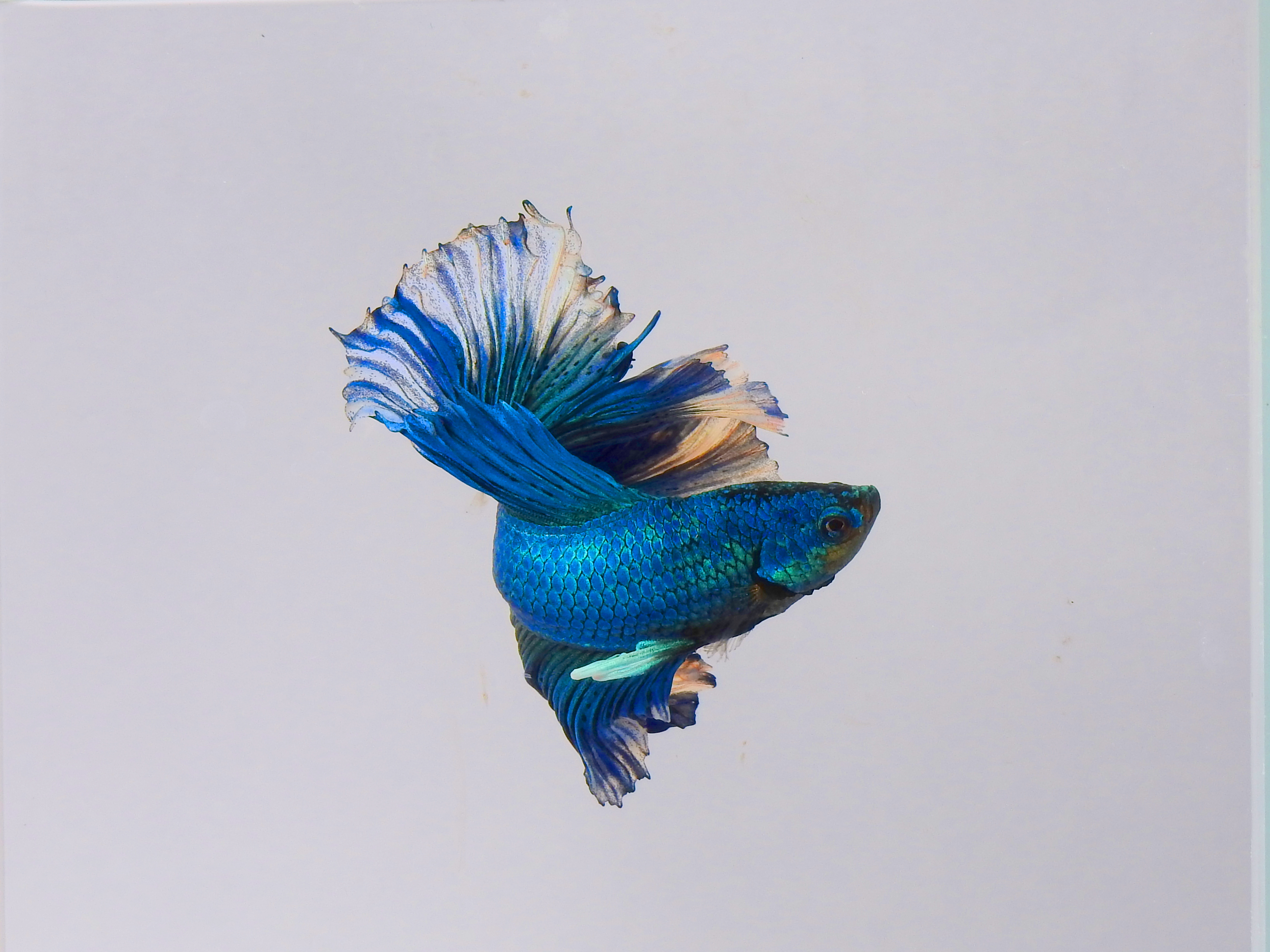
Siamese fighting fish

Krut

Thai flag

Thai National Anthem

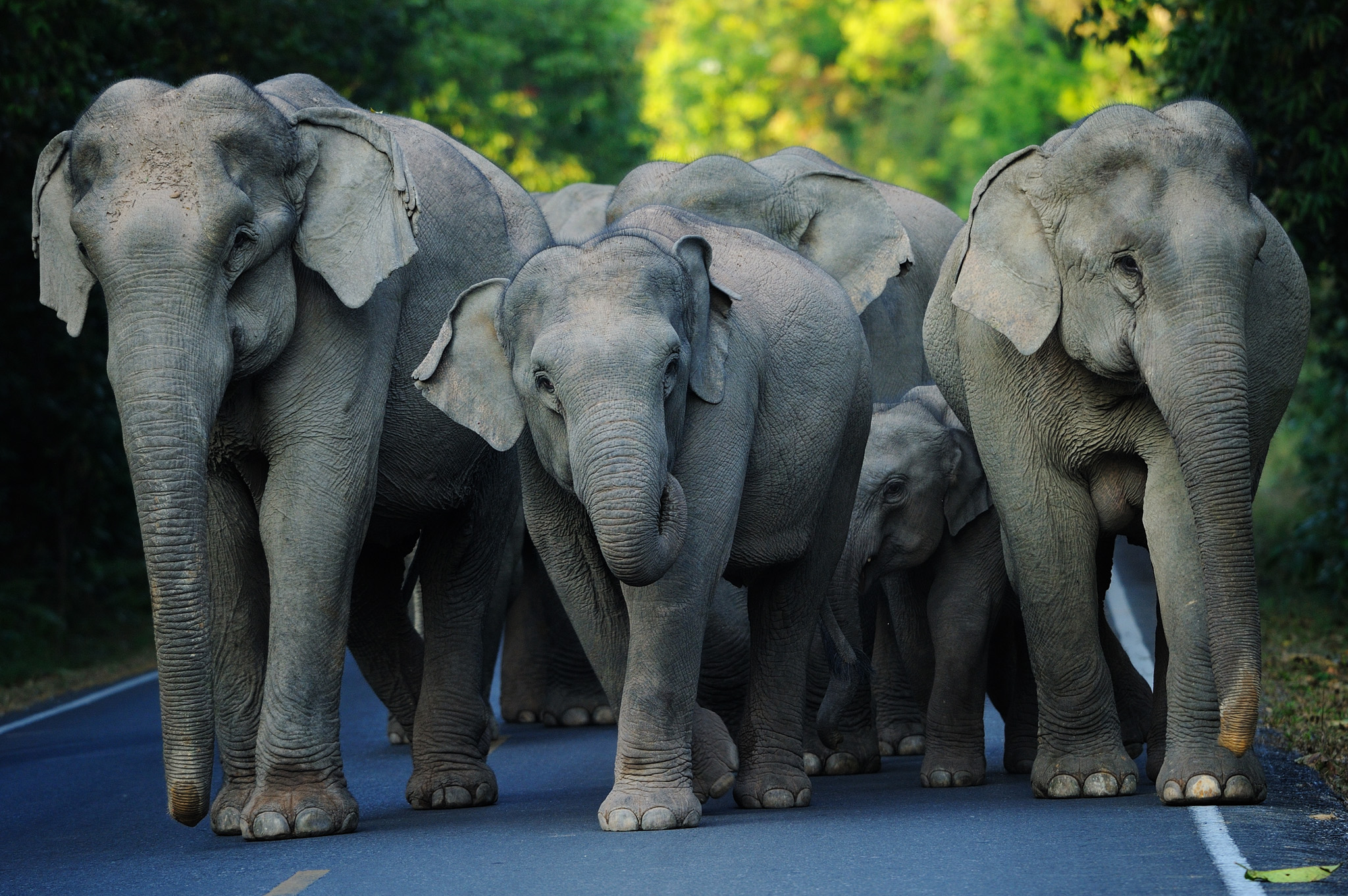
Thai elephant

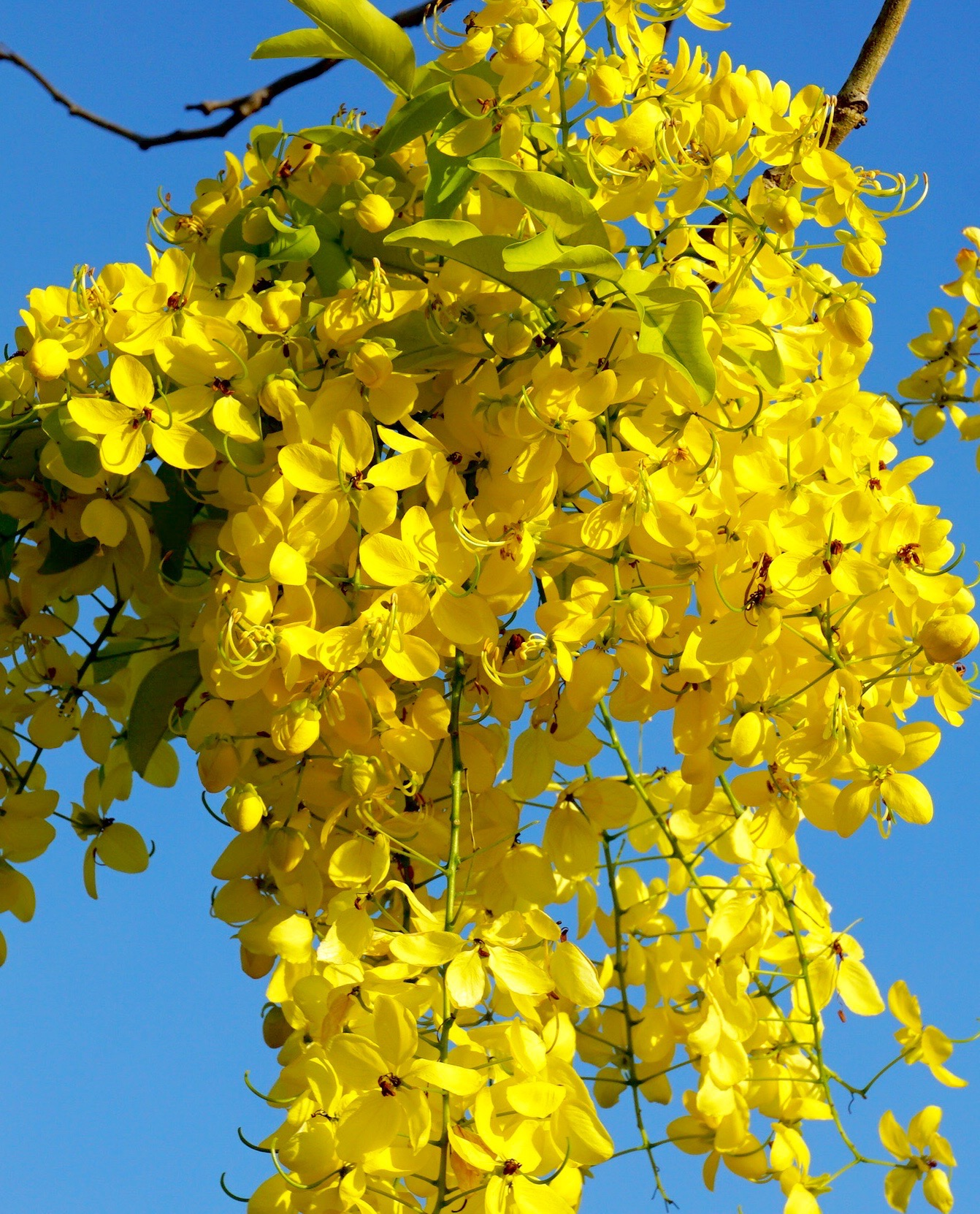
Ratchaphruek

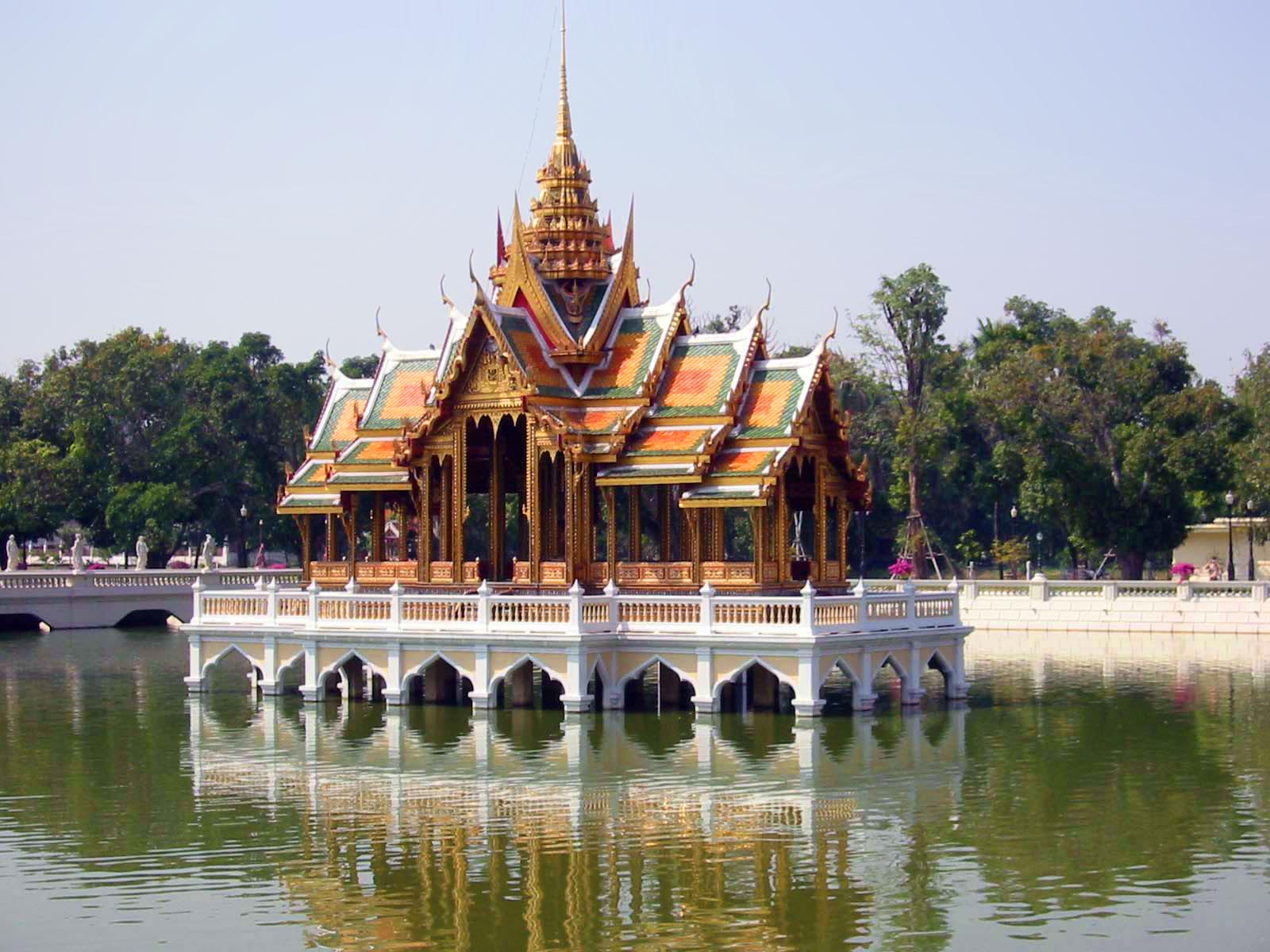
Sala Thai

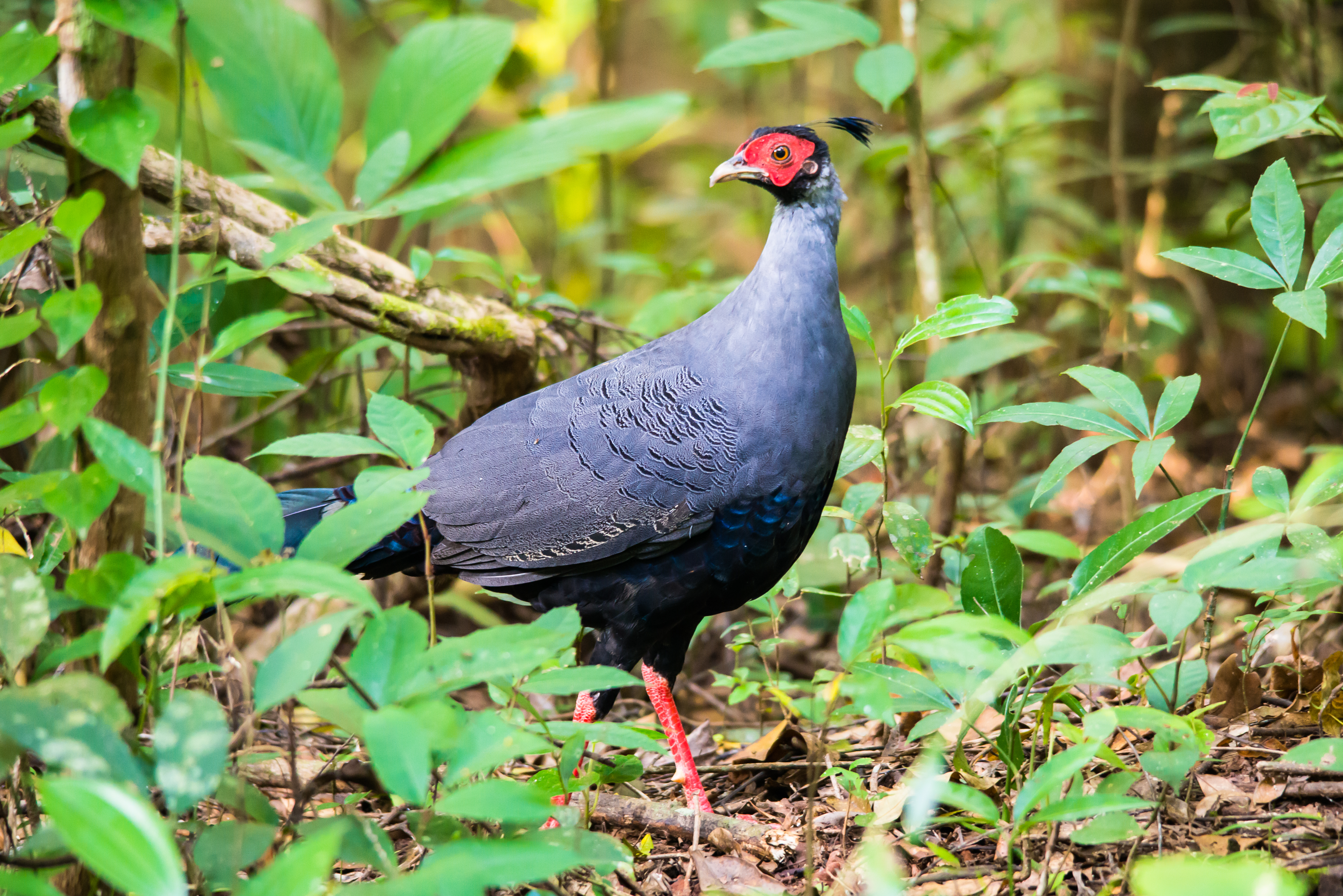
Siamese fireback

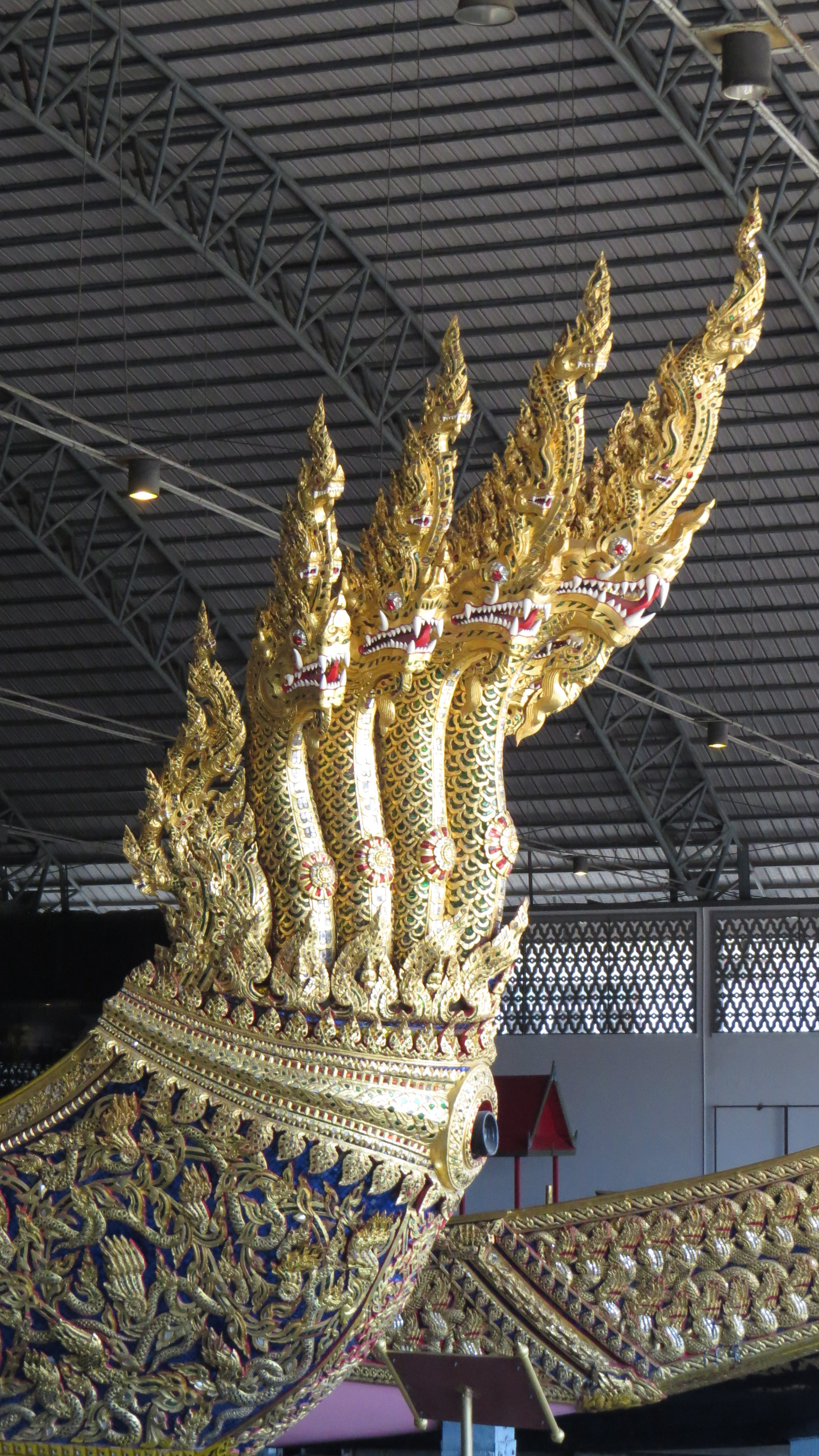
Phaya Nak

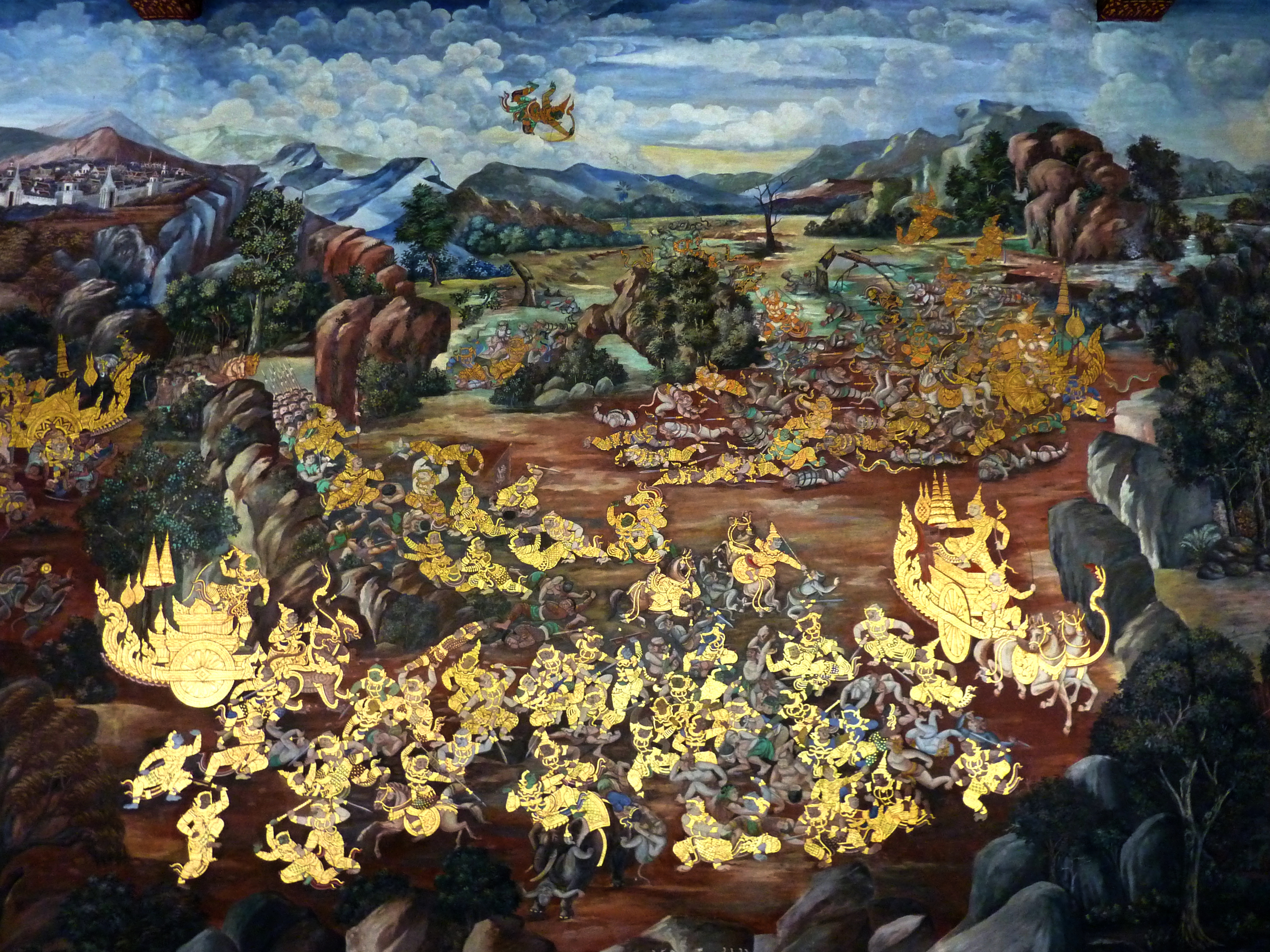
Ramakien

== World sites and Intangible cultural heritage ==
Thailand has several UNESCO World Heritage Sites, including the Historic City of Ayutthaya and the Historic Town of Sukhothai and Associated Historic Towns, both recognized in 1991. Ban Chiang Archaeological Site was also recognized in 1992. In terms of natural heritage, Thungyai-Huai Kha Khaeng Wildlife Sanctuaries were recognized in 1991, followed by Dong Phayayen-Khao Yai Forest Complex in 2005, and Kaeng Krachan Forest Complex in 2021.

Thailand also has several sites on the Tentative List for UNESCO recognition, including Phuphrabat Historical Park listed in 2004, Wat Phra Mahathat Woramahawihan in Nakhon Si Thammarat listed in 2012, and the Monuments, Sites and Cultural Landscape of Chiang Mai, Capital of Lanna listed in 2015. Phra That Phanom, its related historic buildings, and associated landscape were listed in 2017, followed by Ensemble of Phanom Rung, Muang Tam, and Plai Bat Sanctuaries in 2019, and The Ancient Town of Si Thep in the same year. Lastly, in terms of natural heritage, the Andaman Sea Nature Reserves of Thailand were added to the Tentative List in 2021.

Thailand has submitted several elements of its intangible cultural heritage to UNESCO for recognition, such as Nora, a dance drama in southern Thailand recognized in 2021, Nuad Thai, traditional Thai massage recognized in 2019, and Khon, a masked dance drama in Thailand recognized in 2018. In 2023, the Songkran festival has been submitted for UNESCO's consideration as part of Thailand's intangible cultural heritage.

== Pastimes ==
=== Reading and Internet ===
Eighty-eight percent of Thai people read books and spend an average of 28 minutes per day doing so, according to a poll conducted by the Thai Publishers and Booksellers Association (PUBAT) and Chulalongkorn University's Faculty of Economics and Research Centre for Social and Business Development.

In 2013 the Thai National Statistical Office conducted a reading survey that found that Thais aged over six spent an average of 37 minutes a day reading. The survey was not focused specifically on reading books, but also reading journals, the Internet, tablet computers, and smart phones.

== See also ==
- Betel Chewing In Thailand
- Buddhist temples in Thailand
- Cinema of Thailand
- Folklore of Thailand
- Ghosts in Thai culture
- List of museums in Thailand
- Media of Thailand
- Ministry of Culture (Thailand)
- Phya Anuman Rajadhon
- Racism in Thailand
- Royal Flags of Thailand
- Thai Buddhist sculpture
- Thai temple art and architecture
- Thailand National Artist
