= Eulogy of King Prasat Thong =

Eulogy of King Prasat Thong is a long poem in Thai, composed during the king’s reign (1629–1656) by a senior noble. It is the first Thai poem which is specifically a royal panegyric and titled as such. It recounts the main events of the reign, including the building and renaming of the Chakkawat Phaichaiyon audience hall, adjustment of the calendar, a grand almsgiving, and a military parade and festival, all also described in the Royal Chronicles of Ayutthaya. It also states that King Prasat Thong is a bodhisatta, destined to become the tenth in a sequence of ten future Buddhas beginning with Metteyya. This claim is currently found in no other document. The sole manuscript, which was discovered in the 1980s, was copied in 1747/8 and is clearly incomplete. An annotated edition, including a facsimile of the original, was prepared by Buntuean Siworaphot and published in 2000.

== Dating and authorship ==
Eulogy of King Prasat Thong by Phra Maharatchakhru (Thai: คำฉันท์สรรเสริญพระเกียรติสมเด็จพระพุทธเจ้าหลวงปราสาททองของพระมหาราชครู), Khamchan sansoen phrakiat somdet phra phuttha chao luang prasat thong khong phra maharatchakhru, is a long poem in Thai. The only surviving text is a single samut thai dam, a black folding book, kept in the National Library of Thailand, provenance unknown. It has 398 verses with a total of roughly a thousand lines and is clearly incomplete. The cover states:

This Eulogy of King Prasat Thong was composed in the reign of King Prasat Thong as khamchan by Phra Maharatchakhru Mahethon, who was Phra Maharatchakhru Phraborohit when King Narai was king of Lopburi.

The first fold states:

Composed in the reign of King Prasat Thong by Phra Maharatchakhru Phraborohit, the person who composed Tiger and Cow, with the same skill. It seems this eulogy was composed before Tiger and Cow. On the 6th day of the week (Friday), 7th day of the waxing moon, 5th month, Chula Sakarat 1109 [1747/8 CE], year of the rabbit, ninth of the decade, this copy was made from the text that Prince Thep Phiphit brought from a chest in the phra sastrakhom (Thai: พระสาษตราคม, perhaps a library).

The two Maharatchakhru were heads of the Brahmin division within the department of the palace. Buntuean Siworaphot suggests that the author held the slightly junior post of Maharatchakhru Mahethon in the reign of Prasat Thong, and became Maharatchakhru Phraborohit under King Narai (1656–1688). Tiger and Cow refers to Suea kho khamchan (Thai: เสือโคคำฉันท์), a work usually dated early in the reign of King Narai. Prince Thep Phiphit (Khaek) was a son of King Borommakot (1733–1758), who had a prominent role in politics before and after the fall of Ayutthaya in 1767.

== Publication ==
The manuscript of the Eulogy came to light only in the 1980s. A transcription was printed in the Fine Arts Department journal, Silpakorn, in 1988, and reproduced in the Department’s three-volume collection of Ayutthaya literature the same year, followed in 2000 by an edition prepared by Buntuean Siwaraphot with an introduction, facsimile of the manuscript, text in modernized Thai spelling, and glossary.

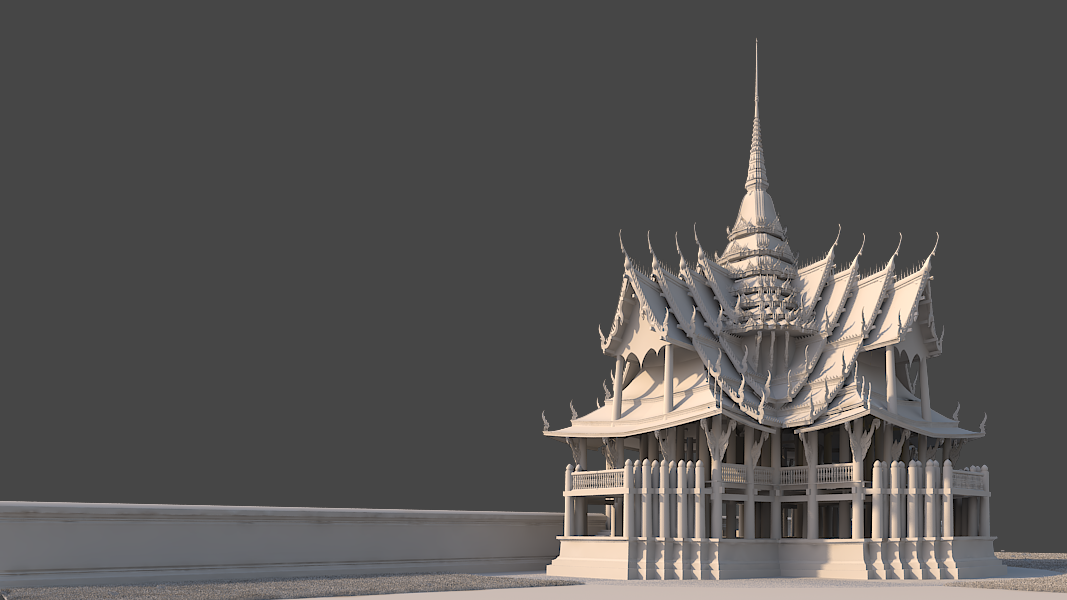
Computer reconstruction of Chakkawat Phaichaiyon audience hall

== Synopsis ==
The Eulogy begins with Prasat Thong descending from the heavens to be born as a bodhisatta and king of Ayutthaya in order to counter the disasters of the Kali Yuga. The events described in the poem—altering the calendar, supporting Buddhism, almsgiving—are part of this mission as well aiding his passage to nibbana and rebirth as a Future Buddha.

1-12: Invocation of the Triple Gem of Buddhism, and honoring the king.

13-67: As the world has entered a Kali Yuga, the god Indra invites a bodhisatta to descend from the heavens to rule in Ayutthaya. Celebrations of the glories of Ayutthaya and the power and splendor of the king.

68-88: The King questions his courtiers in audience about the approach of year 1000 in the Chula Sakarat calendar, and proposes to alter the calendar from a tiger year to a pig year, following instructions in tripanjaka (Thai: ตรีบัญจก), Pali: tri pañcaka, “three times five,” an unknown source.

89-140: The court Brahmans agree, and recount a prophecy that the king is destined to become the tenth in a sequence of Future Buddhas, beginning with Phra Si Ariya Metteyya. They list the king’s talents and his religious patronage. They urge him to alter the calendar as proposed.

141-165: The king builds a new audience hall and names it the Great Palace of Si Yasodhara, an old name for Angkor. The god Indra visits the king in a dream and advises him to create a “wheel battle array,” (Thai: จักรพยู่ห) chakkara phayu, a military formation in the shape of a wheel.

165-198: The king summons his courtiers, recounts the dream, and announces his decision, in response to Indra’s advice, to rename the audience hall as Chakkawat Phaichaiyon (Thai: จักรวัดดิไพชะยนต (จักรวรรดิ์ไพชยนต์)), the “wheel roller of victory,” using Vejayanta, the name of Indra’s banner, palace, and chariot. The courtiers agree.

199-216: The two head court Brahmans go to oversee preparations of a great Mount Meru, surrounded by images of elephants.

217-228: The king also goes to inspect the site.

229-280: The ceremony for “erasing the era” (changing the calendar) is completed, preceded by a Brahmanical fire ceremony, and followed by massive celebrations, many supernatural events, and fulsome praise by the gods.

281-320: The King proceeds around the city in a great procession, offering alms to the people, who come in great numbers. When he dedicates the fruit of this almsgiving to advance his progress towards nibbana, more supernatural events occur.

321-343: The king recalls the austerities performed by other Future Buddhas, including self-mutilation. He decides to perform the seven hundred great donations, meaning donation of seven items, each in the quantity of one hundred.

344-390. A great military parade is held, with many martial displays, climaxing in the donation of a hundred of elephants, horses, male slaves, female slaves, silver, gold and royal chariots. There is a great festival with various entertainments.

391-398: Envoys are received from Ava and Lan Xang.

398: The text ends abruptly in mid-sentence.

== Sample ==
In verses 14-21, Indra invites Prasat Thong to descend to the human world.

๏ อยู่จำเนียรมามนุสสา ทั่วทังโลกา
ก็เกิดพิบัติเบียนบีฬ์
๏ เพราะเหตุถึงกรรมกลี- ยุคทั่วไตรตรี
พิโรธใจพาธา
๏ ด้วยเดชวรพุทธศาสนา ร้อนอาสน์พันตา
พิภพเจ้าไตรตรึงษ์
๏ เป็นโกลาหลอึกอึง ชุมชอมไปถึง
สำนักสมเด็จทศพล
๏ ก้มเกล้าอภิวาทยุคล ทูลแถลงทำงน
ในพื้นพิภพชมพู
๏ มาริสะข้าแต่เจ้ากู ผู้นฤทุกข์ตู
อัญเชิญสมเด็จลีลา
๏ ปางนี้วรพุทธศาสนา โพ้นเกิดธรรมา
นรานิกรเบียดเบียน
๏ เชิญเจ้ากูเสด็จไปเนียร- ทุกข์ศาสน์จงเสถียร-
ภาพห้าพันปี

From the past, humans have lived together for a long time, but now the whole world faces disaster and distress,
because, as a result of karma, all three worlds have entered the Age of Kali, of anger and oppression.
Through the great power of the religion of the Buddha, the throne of the thousand-eyed lord of the Tāvatiṃsa realm became hot,
and a noisy uproar arose, so he [Indra] went to the abode of a ten-powered lord,
bowed his head, prostrated at his two feet, and related the troubles in the Jambu world:
"I invite you, lord, one-without-suffering, to go down.
At this time, mankind is creating trouble for the great religion of the Buddha, which once gave rise to the dhamma.
I invite you, sire, to go down to relieve suffering and make the religion strong and stable for 5,000 years."

== Historical significance ==
The royal panegyric is a prominent genre in Thai poetry, possibly influenced by the Praśasti genre in Sanskrit. Praise of the king is a large element in Yuan Phai, a 15th-century war poem. This is the first work framed and titled specifically as a royal panegyric. It was followed by the Eulogy of King Narai and later works.

In the Eulogy, the ceremony of changing the calendar is identified as Indrabhiseka, an old Indian ceremony based on a legend of Indra flying down in his chariot to present the five insignia of kingship. This identification had been surmised by scholars including Prince Damrong Rajanubhab, George Cœdès and Forrest McGill on the basis of the description of the event in the Royal Chronicles of Ayutthaya, but is here explicitly confirmed (v. 237).

King Prasat Thong is here identified as a bodhisatta, reincarnated from the Palelai elephant which served the Buddha in the forest (v.94-95), and destined to become the tenth in a sequence of ten future Buddhas beginning with Metteyya. This prediction is probably based on texts known as Anagatavaṃsa, “lineage of the future,” in which the tenth Future Buddha is named Sumaṅgala. In the Royal Chronicles of Ayutthaya, the building and renaming of the Chakkawat Phaichaiyon audience hall took place in Chula Sakarat 994 (1632/3 CE), and the revision of the calendar in Chula Sakarat 1000 (1638/9 CE). In the Eulogy, the two events coincide. This adjustment seems to be deliberate

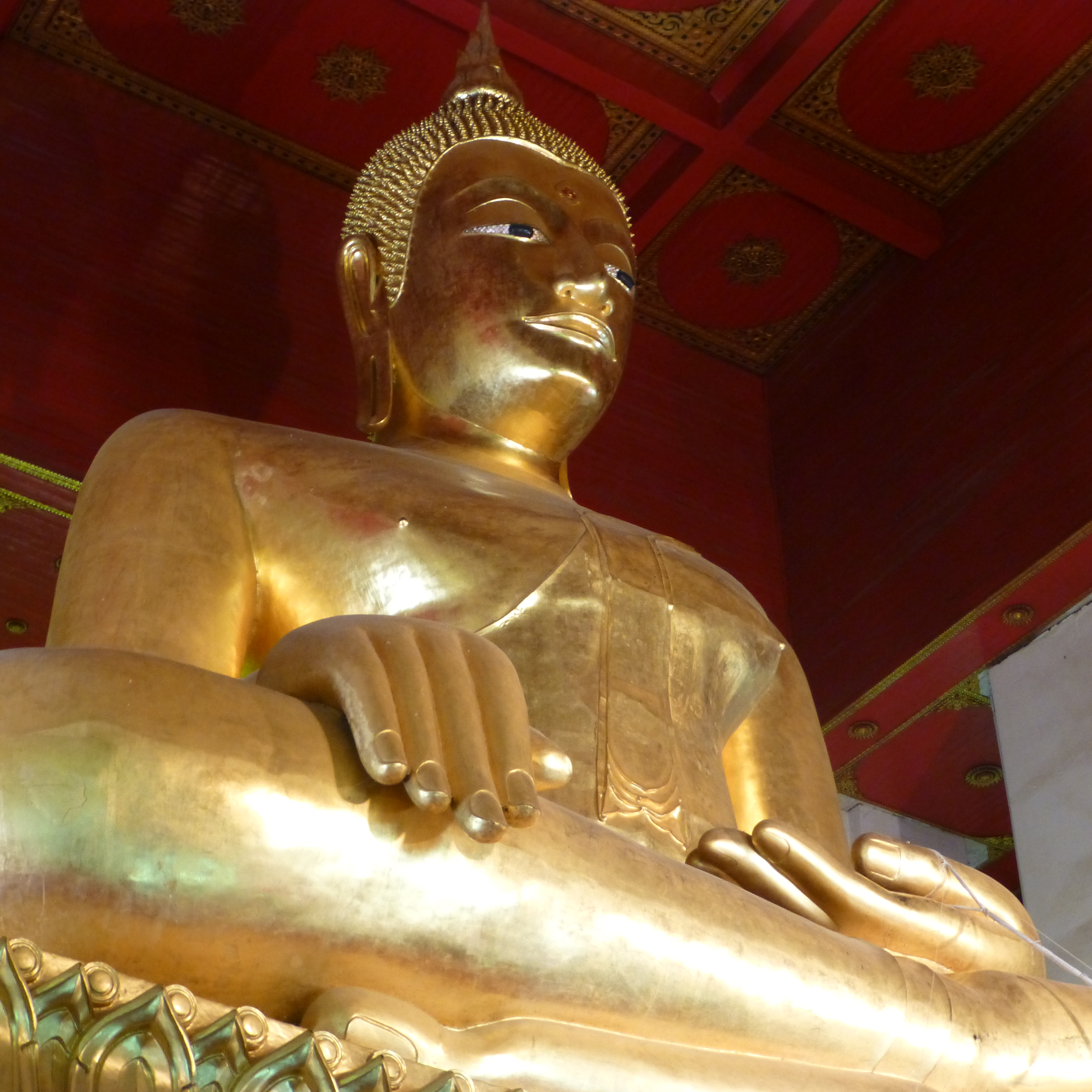
Phra Mongkhon Bophit image

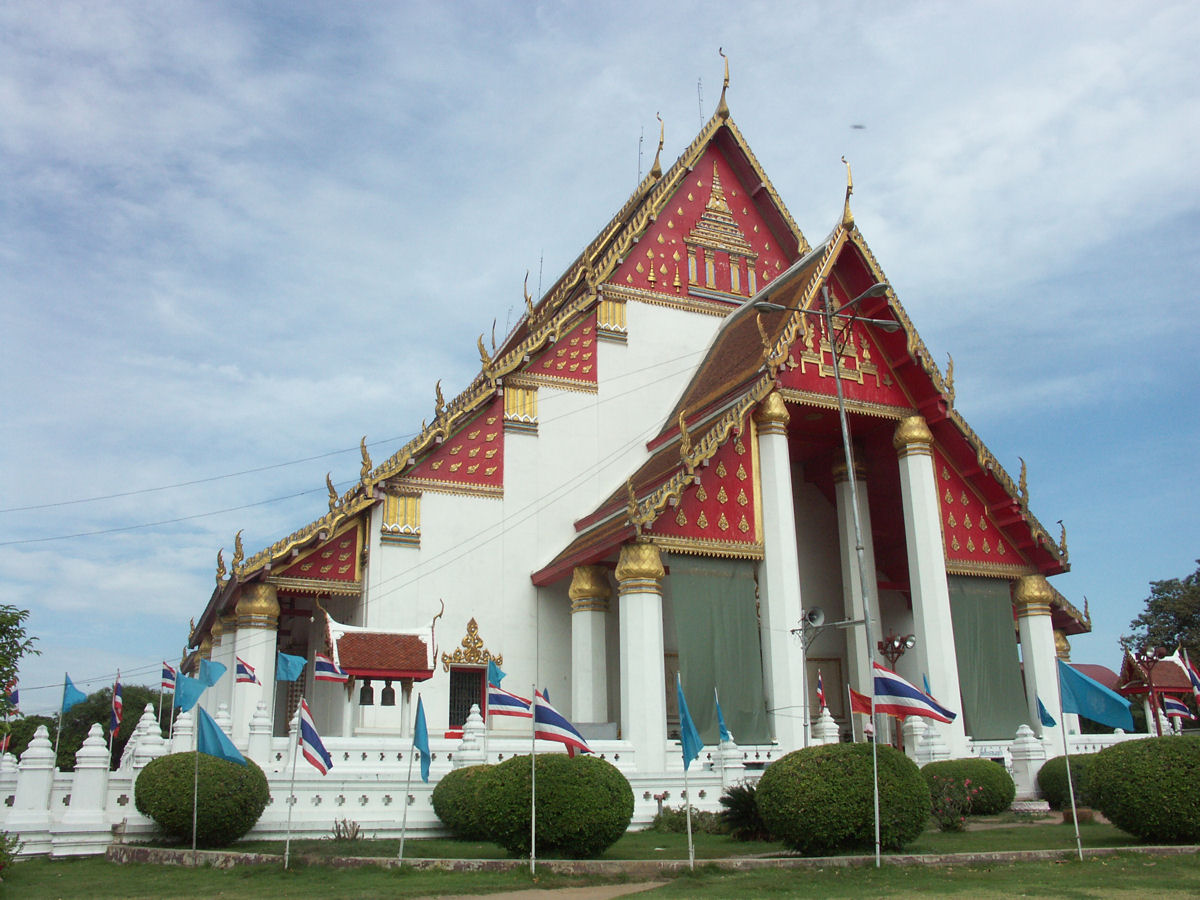
Wat Phra Mongkhon Bophit

== Erasing the era ==
The alteration of the calendar was promoted by the approach of year 1000 in the Chula Sakarat calendar, and by several inauspicious events, including the collapse of part of Wat Mahathat in 1632. The ceremony altered the animal of year 1000 from tiger to pig, three back in the sequence to the same animal as the first year in the Chula Sakarat calendar, signalling a regeneration, a return to the happier Dvapara Yuga era that preceded a Kali Yuga. According to Prasert na Nagara, the change was made on the “fifth month, first waxing, 2181 BE, Thai new year day, equivalent to Monday 15 March 1636 CE, 26 days before the start of CS 1000 on Saturday 2nd waning, fifth month, equivalent to 10 April.” According to the records of the Dutch East India Company, the king held two festivals a year later, for three days at the Thai new year on 3 April 1639 and another three days at the start of CS 1001 on Sunday 10 April, presumably to celebrate the success. According to the Royal Chronicles of Ayutthaya, the change in the calendar was abandoned after Burma refused to adopt the innovation.

== Academic study ==
Boonsomying Polamuangdee proposed that King Prasat Thong was influenced by the religious experience of Phya Lithai (Mahathammaracha) of Sukhothai, as detailed in Sukhothai inscriptions.

Pitchaya Soomjinda has drawn on the Eulogy to analyze the art history of Prasat Thong’s reign. He proposed that the line “the king built great fragrant quarters for a Buddha image with an aura of shimmering gold” refers to the rehousing around 1638/39 of the image now known as Phra Mongkhon Bophit, named after Sumaṅgala, his name as a future Buddha. Pitchaya also suggests that “the great preaching hall in the wat for the great holy omniscient one” built by the King (v.110) is the wihan palelai on the south side of Wat Phra Si Sanphet, where there is a triple plinth suitable for images of a Buddha flanked by an elephant and monkey. Both these renovations hence refer to King Prasat Thong as a bodhisatta and future Buddha. Pitchaya argues that the King’s extensive religious patronage and his revision of the calendar were efforts to overcome his lack of legitimacy after usurping the throne.

== Meter ==
The poem is composed in seven meters derived from Pali-Sanskrit forms. Each has a fixed number of syllables per hemastich, and a specific rhyming scheme." Two are of the type kap (Thai: กาพย์): These are: chabang 16 (Thai: ฉบัง ๑๖) and surangkhanang 28 (Thai: สุรางคนางค์ ๒๘). Five are of the type chan (Thai: ฉันท์). These are: wasandilok 14 (Thai: วสันตดิลก ๑๔), intharawichian 11 (Thai: อินทรวิเชียร ๑๑'), totok 12 (Thai: โตฎก ๑๒), malini 15 (Thai: มาลินี ๑๕), and satthara 21 (Thai: สัทธรา ๒๑).
