= Wat Phra That Hariphunchai =

11th century Thai Buddhist Temple in Lamphun

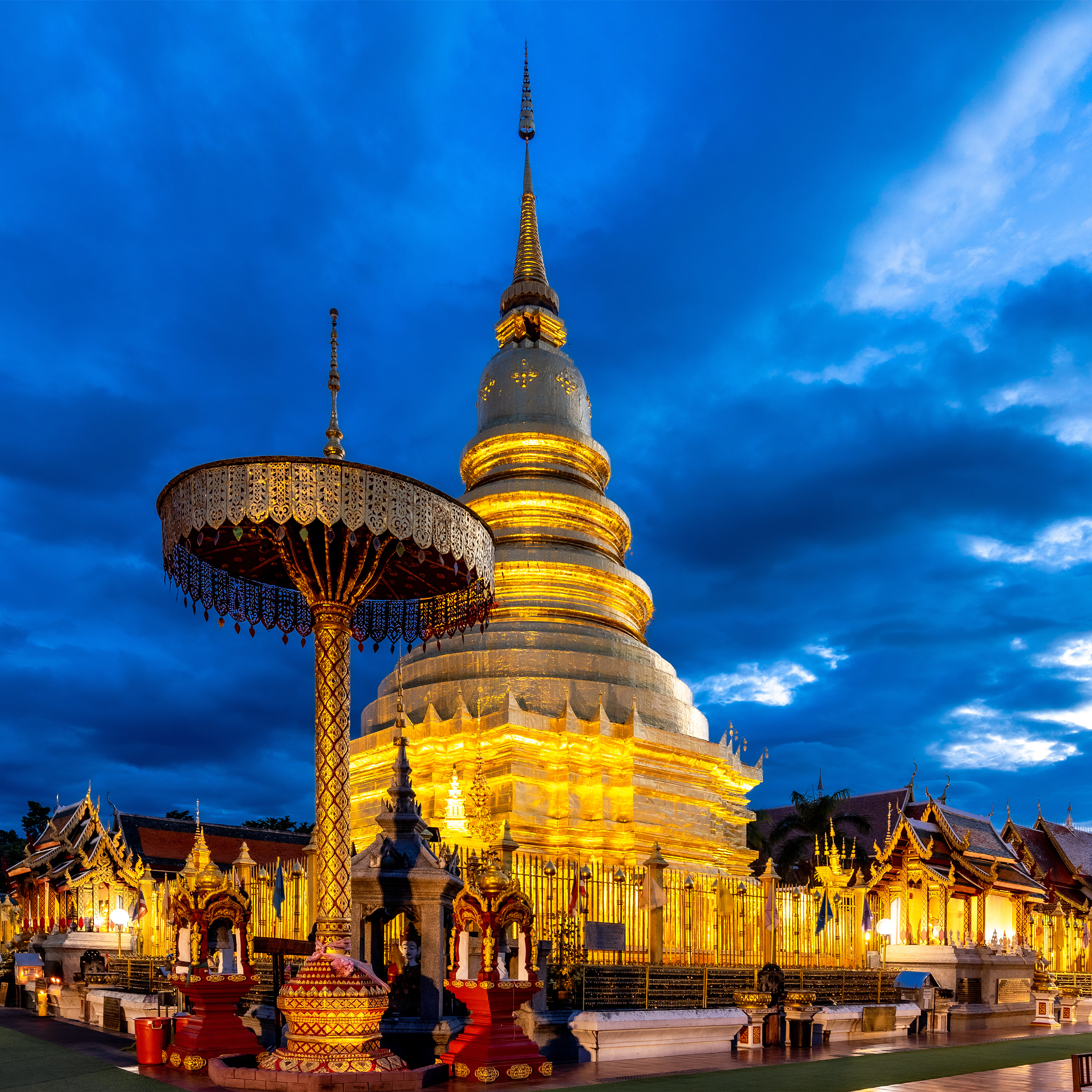
- The stupa of Wat Phra That Hariphunchai in 2022

- Location in Thailand

Religion
- Affiliation: Theravada Buddhism

Location
- Location: Lamphun, Lamphun Province
- Country: Thailand
- Interactive map of Wat Phra That Hariphunchai
- Coordinates: 18°34′39″N 99°0′28″E

Architecture
- Founder: King Athitayarai
- Completed: 1044

Wat Phra That Hariphunchai (Thai: วัดพระธาตุหริภุญชัย) is a Buddhist temple (wat) in Lamphun, Thailand. The temple's origins date from the 11th century but the central stupa is thought to originate in the 9th century.

== History ==
Wat Phra That Hariphunchai's earliest origins were in 897 when the then king of Hariphunchai is said to have built a stupa (now the central stupa) to house a hair of the Buddha. The present compound, founded by Hariphunchai King Athitayarat, dates from 1044.

The temple was first rebuilt in 1443 by King Tilokaraja of Lanna kingdom Chiang Mai. The temple's pyramid-shaped Chedi Suwanna was built in 1418. In the 1930s temple renovations were made by the northern Thai monk Khru Ba Sriwichai.

Nirat Hariphunchai, a poem of around 720 lines, originally written in Northern Thai language, describes a journey from Chiang Mai to worship at Wat Phra Thai Hariphunchai, possibly in 1517/8.

== Architecture ==
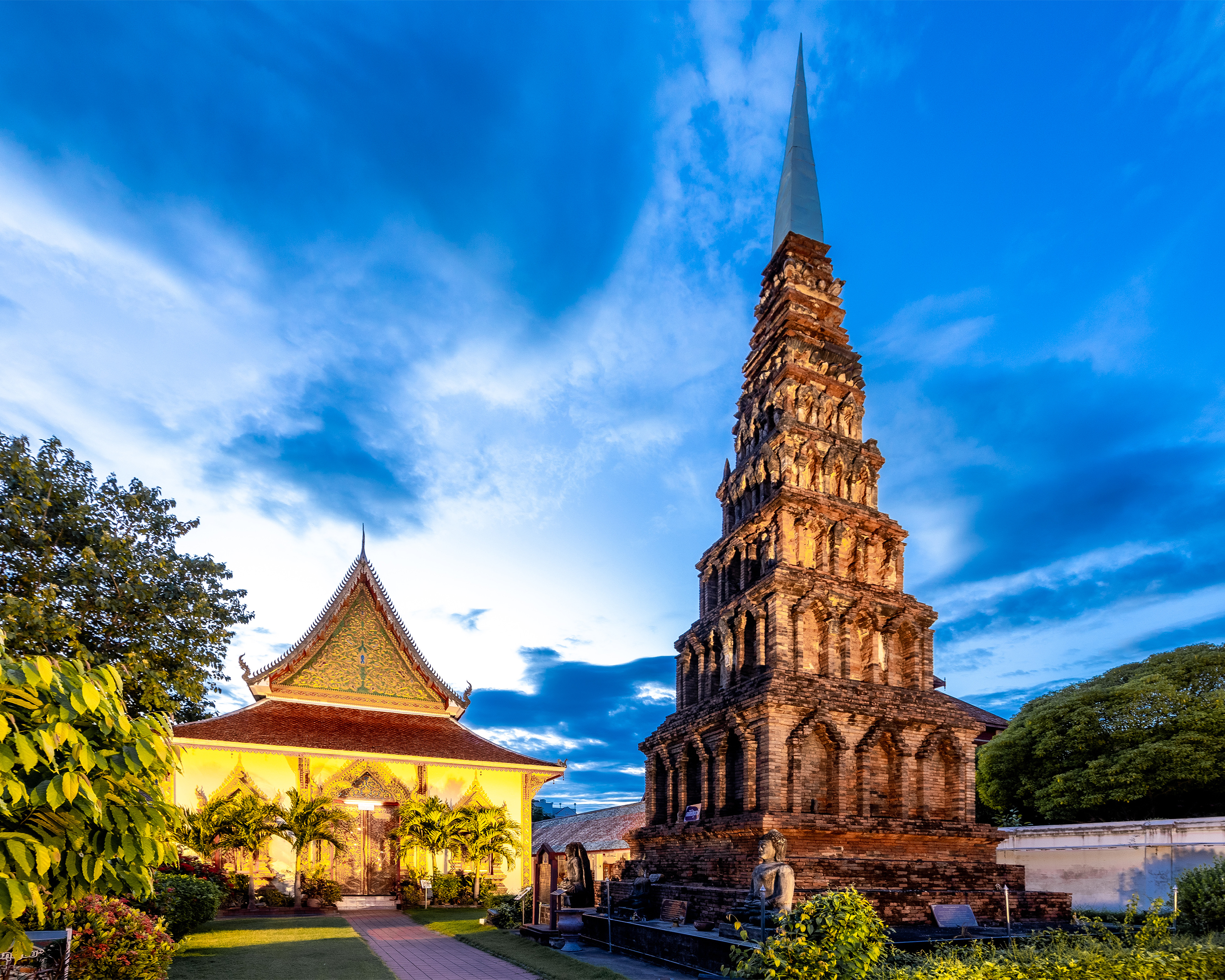
Chedi Suwanna

The restoration of 1443 enlarged and enhanced the central stupa, including the incorporation of repousse Buddha images on bronze sheets affixed to the stupa bell element (anda). These repousse Buddhas are indicative of the Lanna Early Classic period.

The unusual pyramid-shaped, 46 m high Chedi Suwanna in the northwest of the compound is in the Dvaravati-style of the Haripunchai period and believed to be modeled on similar stupas at nearby Wat Chama Thewi (Wat Kukut). The chedi is featured on the reverse of the one-satang coin.

Wat Phra That Hariphunchai's wihan houses a 15th-century Lanna Buddha. Near the wihan is a library of 19th-century origin. The library's staircase features naga images. Also near the wihan is a large bronze gong, purportedly the world's largest. The gong dates from 1860.

== Mythology ==
The southwestern corner of the temple compound has a stone indented with four footprints. Worshippers believe these to confirm the legend of a Buddha visit to the area.
