= Eulogy of King Narai =

17th-century Thai poem

Eulogy of King Narai (Thai: โคลงเฉลิมพระเกียรติสมเด็จพระนารายณ์มหาราช) is a Thai poem composed during the reign of King Narai (1656–1688). It is a major example of the Thai genre of royal panegyrics. The identity of the author is uncertain. The poem relates the key events of the reign, the king’s power, his palace at Lopburi, the beauties of the forest, and an elephant hunt.

== Dating and authorship ==
The poem was probably composed in the early 1680s as no event after 1680 is mentioned in the text. As with most old Thai literature, the author is not identified. Some authorities attribute authorship to Luang Si Mahosot, while others including Winai Pongsripian favour Phra Maharatchakhru, a head of the Brahman department, and author of several other poetic works.

== Significance ==
The royal panegyric is a prominent genre in Thai poetry, possibly influenced by the Praśasti genre in Sanskrit. Praise of the king is a large element in Yuan Phai, a 15th-century war poem. The first work framed and titled specifically as a royal panegyric was the Eulogy of King Prasat Thong about King Narai’s father and predecessor.

King Narai (1656–1688) is best known for his involvement with the British and French in the later part of his reign. This poem dates before the climax of that involvement. It portrays Narai as the ruler of a powerful and flourishing Ayutthaya Kingdom. It describes his power stretching in all four directions, the grandeur of his palace at Lopburi, the beauty of the forest, and the excitement of an elephant hunt.

== Publication and translation ==
The poem was first printed in 1925 on the instigation of Princess Nabhabhorn Prabha (Thai: พระเจ้าบรมวงศ์เธอ พระองค์เจ้านภาพรประภา กรมหลวงทิพยรัตนกิริฎกุลินี), a daughter of King Mongkut. An English translation by historian Dhiravat na Pombejra was published in 2015.

== Form ==
The poem has 78 four-line verses composed in khlong si suphap (Thai: โคลงสี่สุภาพ), the refined version of the khlong form.

== Synopsis ==
1: Invocation of the Hindu gods, Shiva, Brahma, Vishnu.

2–15: Important events: receipt of a white elephant; military campaign to Chiang Mai and acquisition of the Phra Phuttha Sihing image; homage from Ava, Champa, Cambodia, and Kedah; suppression of rebellion in Songkhla.

16–25: Description of the royal palace in Lopburi including the Dusit Prasat Hall, Chanthraphisan Hall, gardens, and the piped water system.

26: Happiness of the kingdom

๏สมบูรณ์พูลเกษตรล้วน เกษมสุข
สมเสพย์สโมสรสนุก เรื่อยหล้า
สำเภาเพียบบรรทุก ทรัพย์มาก มานา
สมบัติพัสถานกล้า กลาดด้วยสมภาร ฯ

The fields are more bountiful, bringing contentment to all
who live together happily throughout the whole kingdom.
Junks come filled with various precious goods,
people's property and possessions are secure and all prosper through His Majesty's accumulated merit. (v. 26)

27–41: Lyrical description of the king visiting the forest, describing trees, flowers, aquatic life, birds, and animals; allusion to the Than Kasem and Satchaphan Hill, visited on pilgrimages to the Buddha footprint at Phra Phutthabat

42–64: Elephant hunt: initial ceremonies; the king releases a captured cow elephant; corralling a large herd; description of the king’s mount; selection of the best captured elephants; the king rewards the hunters and officials with money and garments; return to the city.

๏เสนาเนืองไพร่พร้อม อึดอึง
ส้าวแซ่เสียงบืนผึง ป่าก้อง
แจจรรโจษพลหึง แหนรอบ
ตีจรขาบขับร้อง โห่เร้ารุกราญ ฯ

The commanders and their retainers together make a resounding noise.
The sound of gunfire intermittently echoes in the forest.
The shouts and commands of the men surrounding the elephants are confusingly deafening,
while the sound of beating clappers accompanies the men's morale-boosting cries upon approaching the herd. (v.53)

65–78: Invocations, asking for blessings from the major and minor Hindu gods and goddesses.

== Appraisal ==
The two earlier Thai eulogies, Yuan Phai and the Eulogy of King Prasat Thong are largely historical accounts of the reign. The Eulogy of King Narai is more thematic in style. It includes a lyrical celebration of the beauty of the forest, a common topic for Thai poets but something not found in the earlier eulogies. It celebrates the piped water system in the Lopburi palace, a touch of innovation. The longest section is an account of an elephant hunt. King Narai is believed to have spent much of the year at Lopburi because he could hunt elephants and tigers nearby. He built an elephant enclosure and a hunting lodge at Thale Chupson on the outskirts of the city. A poem of lullabies for elephants is believed to have been composed during his reign.

The conventional invocations at the start and end of the poem mention several Hindu gods, but make no reference to Buddhism. Scholars have wondered whether this reflected the king’s conflict with the monkhood.
