= Nirat Hariphunchai =

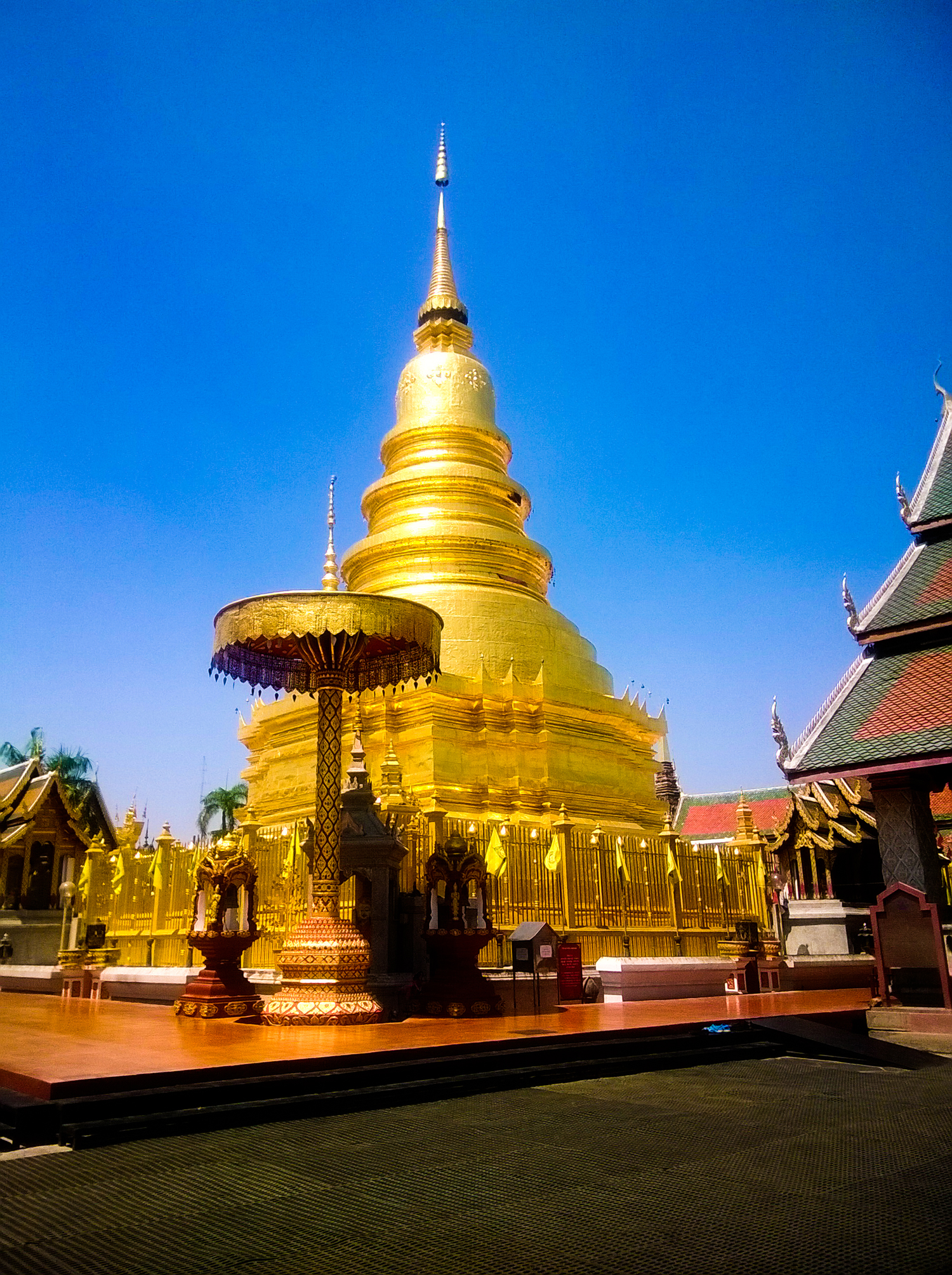
'Wat Phra That Hariphunchai. Photo by Ritthichai Siangdee.

Nirat Hariphunchai (Thai: โคลงนิราศหริภุญชัย, Khlong nirat hariphunchai) is an old poem of around 720 lines, originally composed in Northern Thai language. Nirat, derived from a Sanskrit word meaning “without”, is a genre of Thai poetry that involves travel and love-longing for a separated beloved. Hariphunchai (Pali: Haribhuñjaya) was an ancient kingdom, centered at Lamphun, incorporated into the Lan Na kingdom by Mangrai in the late 13th century. The poem recounts a journey from Chiang Mai to Lamphun to venerate the Buddhist reliquary, Wat Phra That Hariphunchai, with visits to around twenty temples and shrines along the way. During the journey, the author laments his separation from his beloved Si Thip. The journey takes two or three days. The poem ends at a festival in the reliquary, attended by a queen and her son. The original may date to 1517/18 CE. The poem was little appreciated until recently owing to the difficulty of the old language.

== Manuscripts and publication ==
Seven texts written in Northern Thai language on palm leaf have been found in Lan Na at Chiang Mai, Chiang Rai, Lamphun and Phayao. Another text on samut thai in Siamese Thai is lodged in the National Library of Thailand, in four copies with similar content. It is believed that a manuscript was brought from Lan Na to Ayutthaya, possibly by King Narai’s military expedition in 1661, and adapted into Siamese Thai, though there is no evidence.

The Siamese text was first printed by the Vajirayana Library in 1924 with a preface by Prince Damrong Rajanubhab, stating that the work “may be the model for the nirat composed in Ayutthaya and down to Bangkok.” However, the work was little read because the language is obscure. In 1943, the historian and linguist Prasert na Nagara began transcribing the Lanna text into modern Thai characters. The result was circulated privately and published a year later as a cremation book. Around 1959, the author and scholar Phya Anuman Rajadhon encouraged Prasert na Nagara to expand and publish his work. The result was printed in the journal of the Thai Society of Language and Literature in 1960. In 1973 Prasert published an expanded edition with the transcribed Lanna text, the Siamese text, annotations, a rendering in modern Thai, a short introduction, mostly on the dating, and an appendix on words and places by Wijit Yodsuwan.

In 1989, Lamoon Janhom completed an MA thesis at Chiang Mai University with a comparison of six Lanna texts (see table), and her harmonized version which she claimed as “the closest to the original.”

In 1992, Thiu Wichaikhatkha and Phaithun Dokbua published another Lanna text which they dubbed the “Lamphun version.”

In 2019 Winai Pongsripian completed a new edition with new renderings in modern Thai and in English along with historical research on the poem’s background.

The name Nirat Hariphunchai may have been applied later, after the nirat genre had developed. In one manuscript from Wat Chedi Luang the poem is called lamlaphun (Thai: ลำลพุน), the Lamphun recitation.

== Date and authorship ==
The opening verse gives the date of composition in the sixty-year cycle as “year of the ox, ninth of the decade”. This could be 1457/8, 1517/8, 1577/8, 1637/8, and so on. Prince Damrong surmised it was 1637/8 in the reign of King Prasat Thong or before then.

Prasert na Nagara proposed it was 1517/8. The poem mentions that the Phra Kaeo Morakot, the Emerald Buddha, is resident in Wat Chedi Luang, Chiang Mai, which was true only from 1468 to 1548, and the Phra Sihing Buddha is resident in Wat Phra Singh, Chiang Mai, which was true only from 1407 to 1548. The only year within these ranges that matches the animal year is 1517/8.

Some scholars have cast doubts on this date on grounds of other evidence in the poem.

From vocabulary used in the poem, it is clear that the author and his beloved were of royal lineage. For example, he refer to his offerings as ratchakuson (Thai: ราชกุศล, Pali: rājākusala), “royal good works” (v.126), and describes the beloved as akkhacha (Thai: อัคคชา, Pali: agga chāya), “primary consort/queen” (v.127).

Winai Pongsripian proposed that the author was King Mueang Kaeo (r. 1495–1525), ruler of Chiang Mai in 1517/8, and that the beloved Si Thip was his major queen. Like other Chiang Mai rulers, Mueang Kaeo patronised Wat Phra That Hariphunchai. In 1512/3, he built a palace on the outskirts of Hariphunchai-Lamphun, initiated the constructed of a great preaching hall in the reliquary, and had the city walls strengthened, following several armed raids from Ayutthaya in recent years. Winai suggests that the visit in 1517/8 was thus to inspect the new walls and hold a ceremony to inaugurate the new preaching hall.

Aroonrat Wichienkeeo proposed that the author was a noble called Maha-Ammat from Lampang and that Si Thip was his wife, Pongnoi, the mother of King Mueang Kaeo.

== Form ==
The poem has 181 four line verses in khlong si meter, with many different variations of rhyme and tone, and no chain rhymes linking one verse to the next.

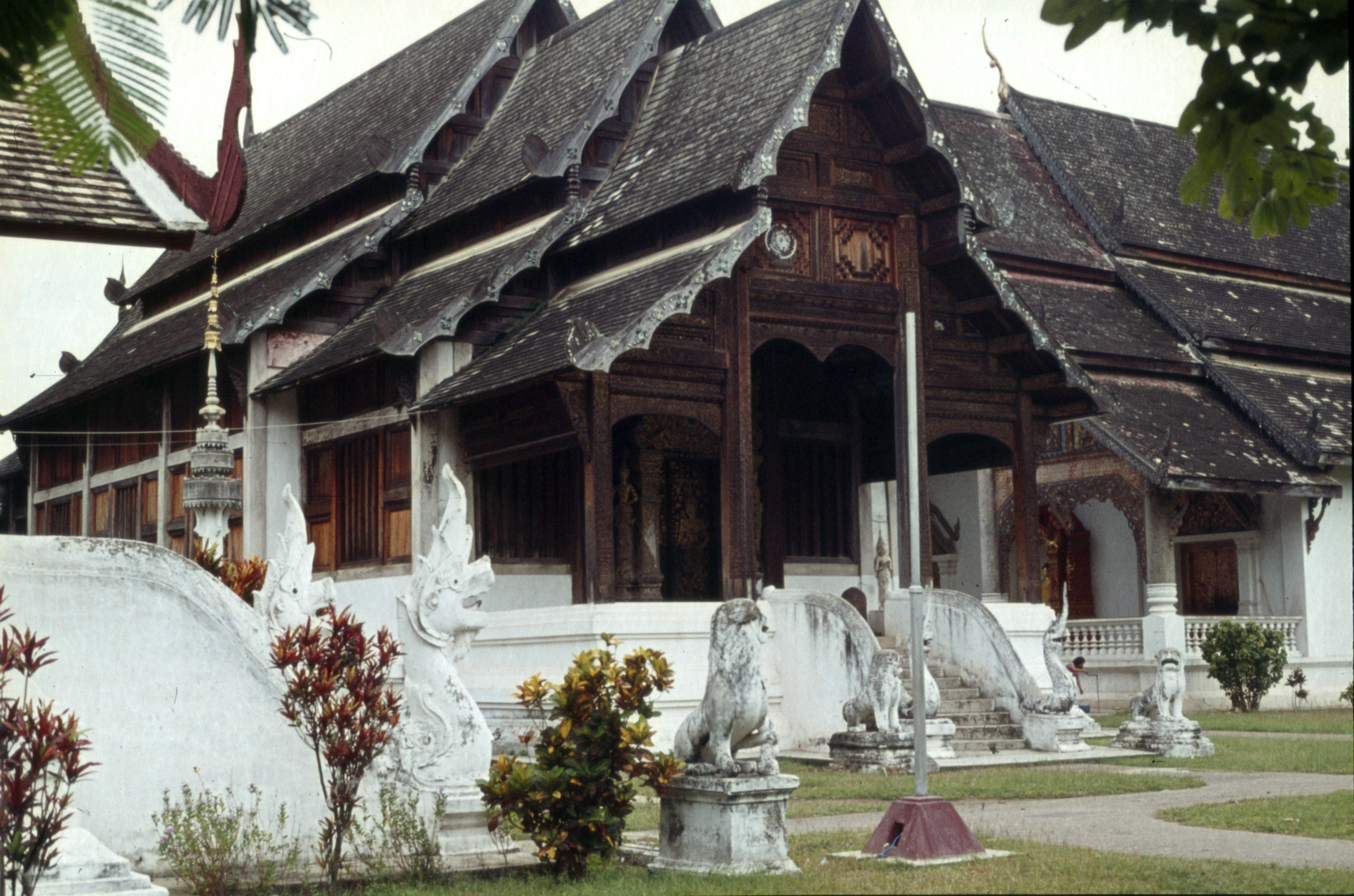
Wat Phra Singh, Chiang Mai, 1976. Photo by Gerd Eichmann

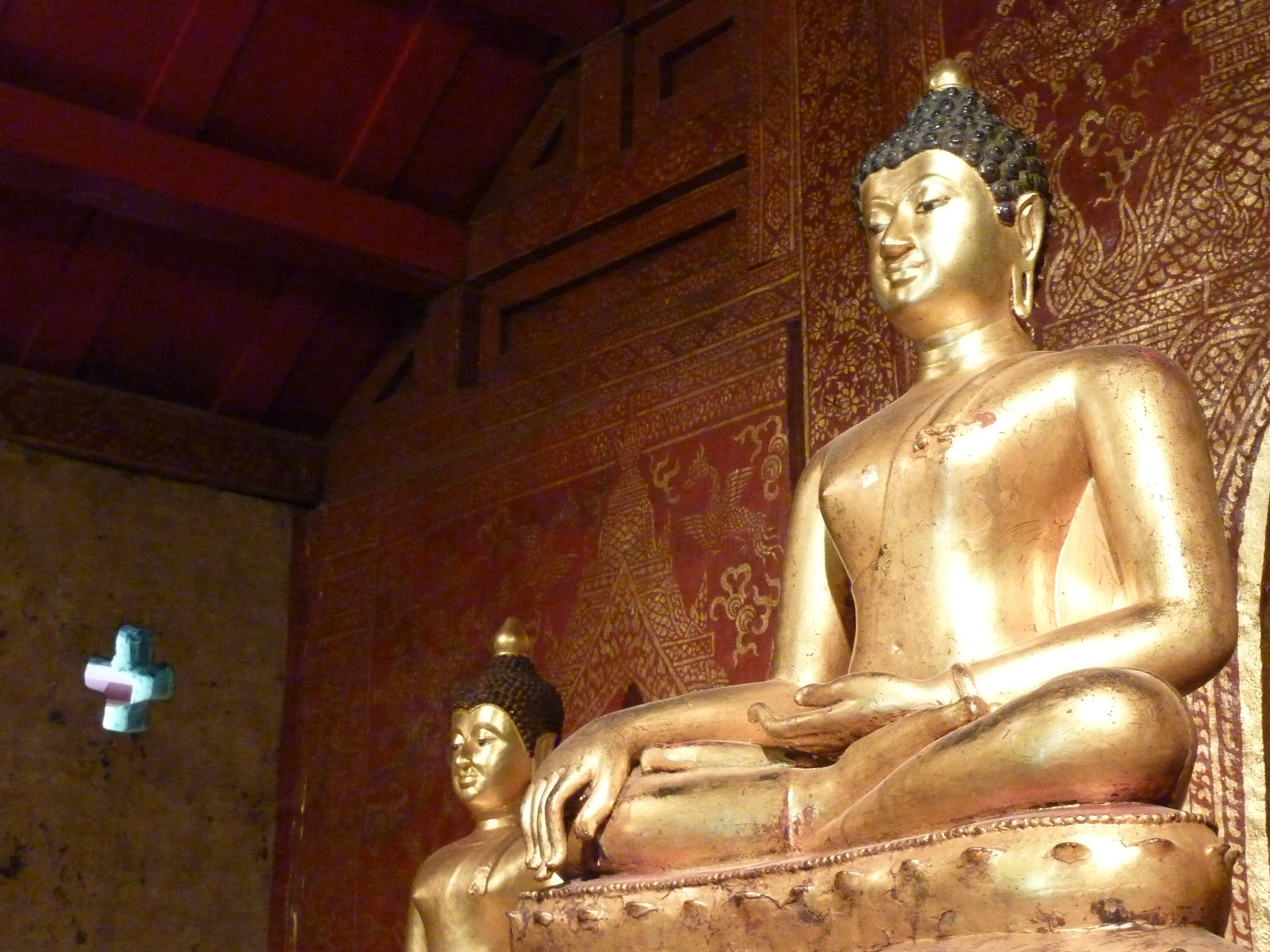
Phra Sihing Buddha in Wat Phra Singh. Photo by Photo Dharma.

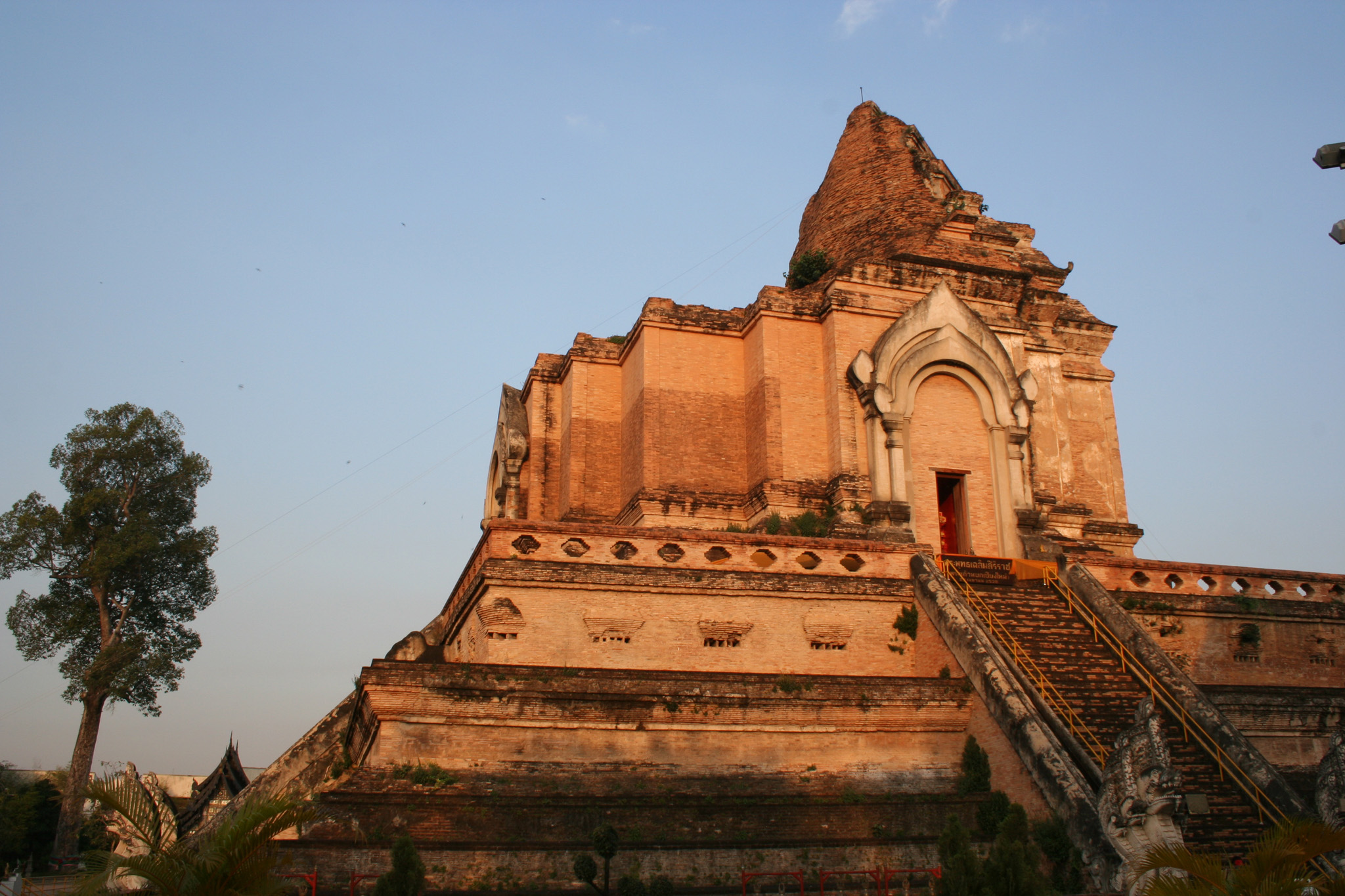
Wat Chedi Luang, Chiang Mai. Photo by Flying Pharmacist.

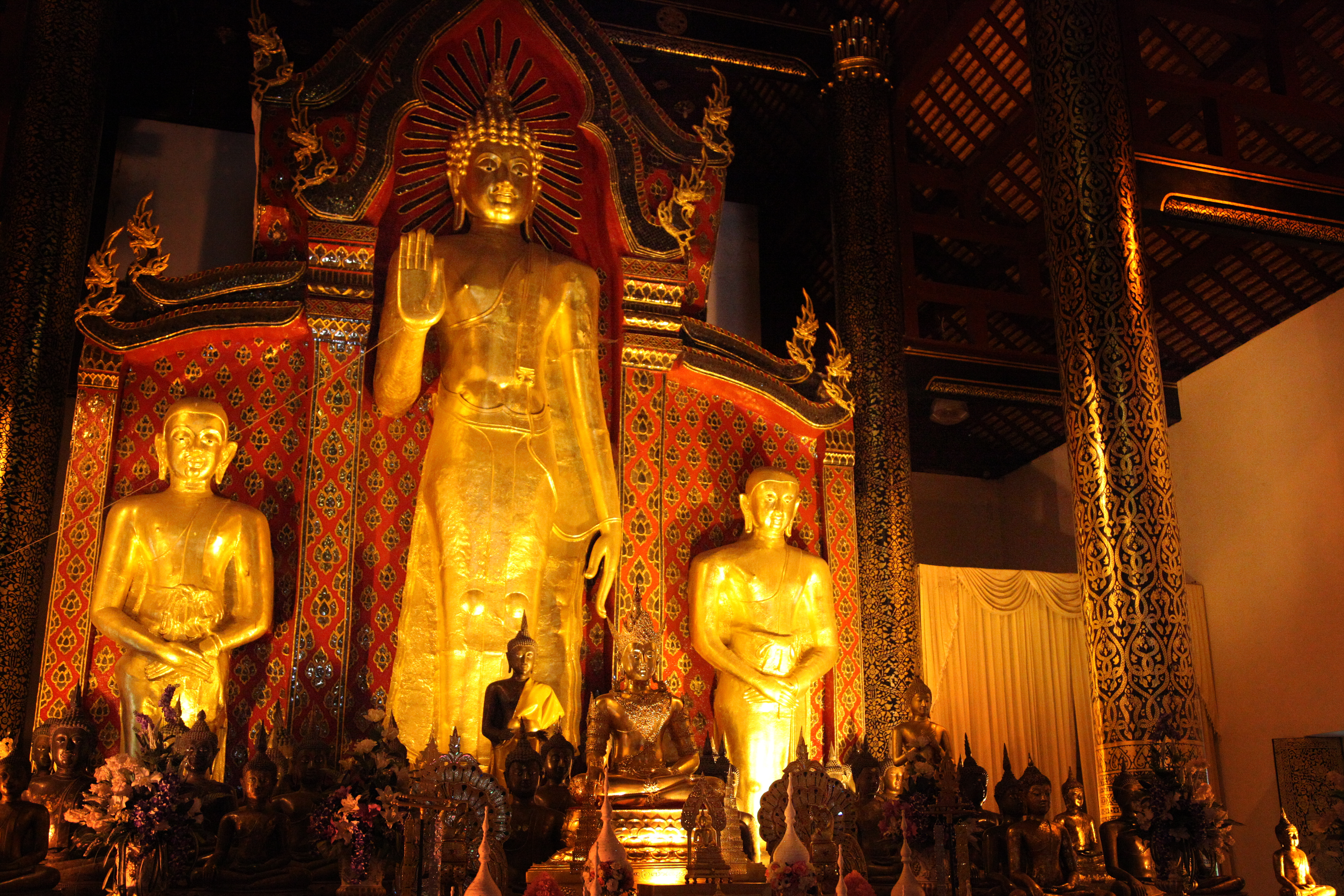
18-cubit image in wihan of Wat Chedi Luang. Photo by Kittipong Khunnen.

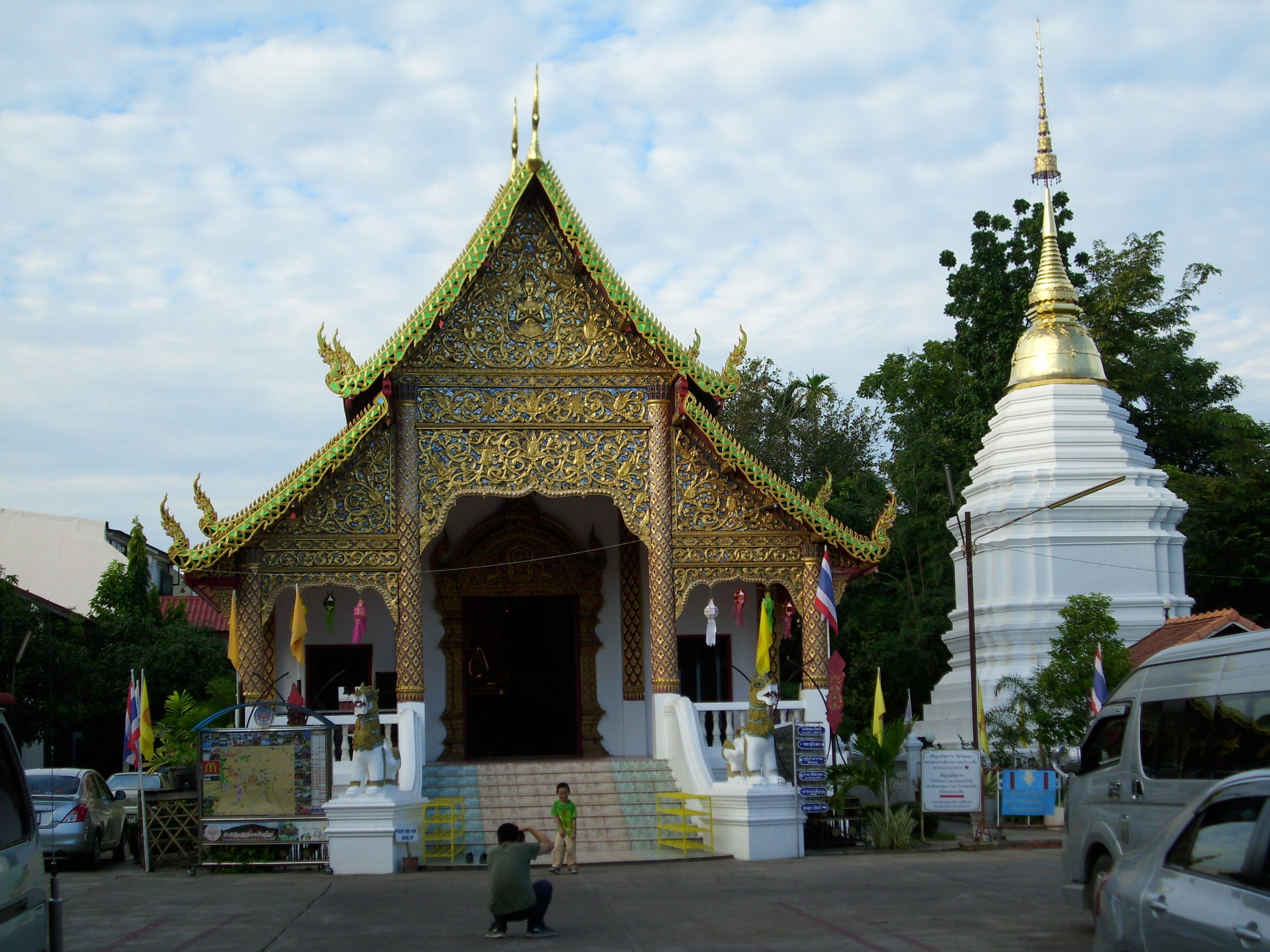
Wat Chai Prakiat, Chiang Mai. Photo by Јован Вуковић.

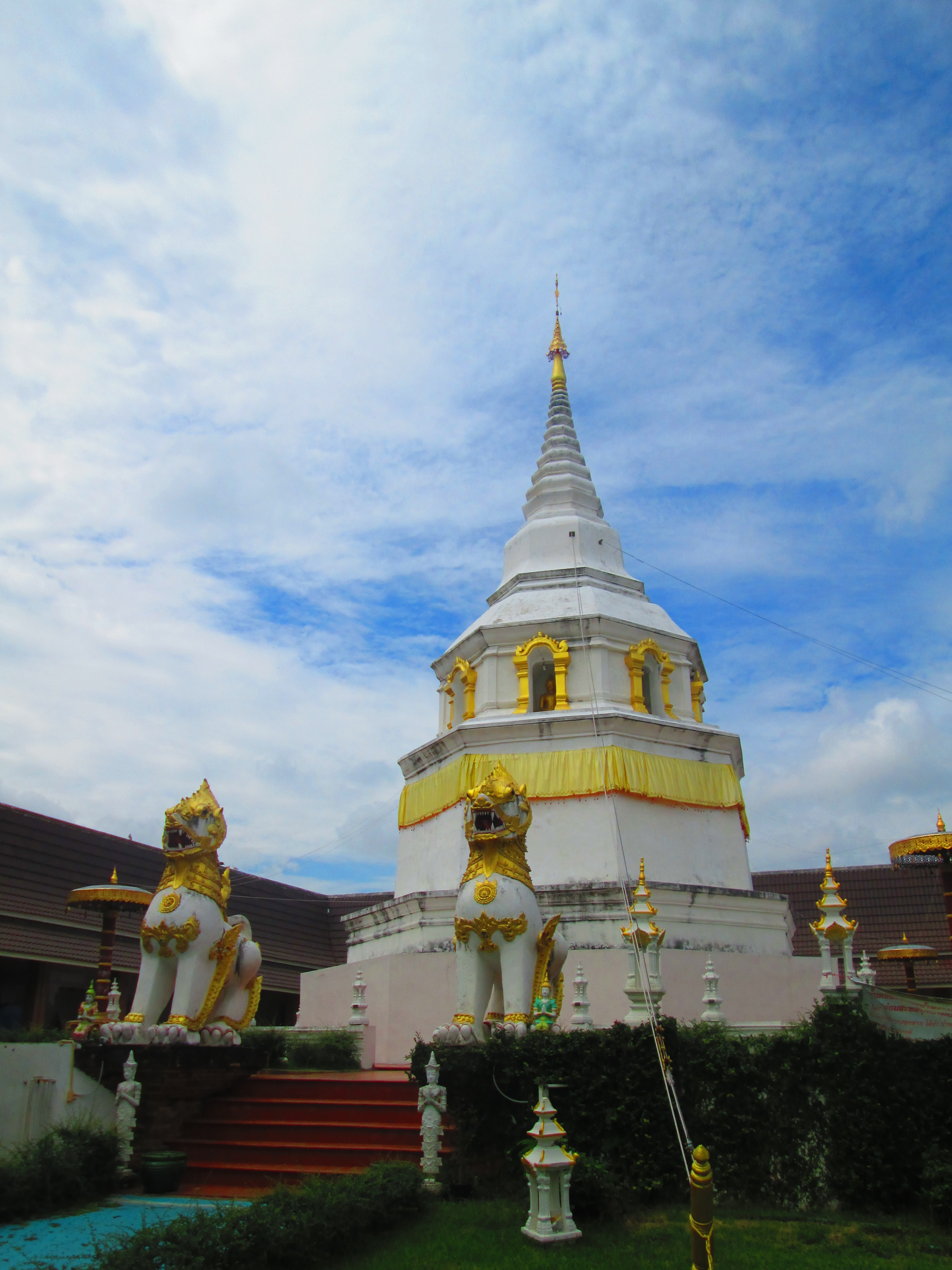
Wat Yang Kuang, Chiang Mai. Photo by Littlecat98.

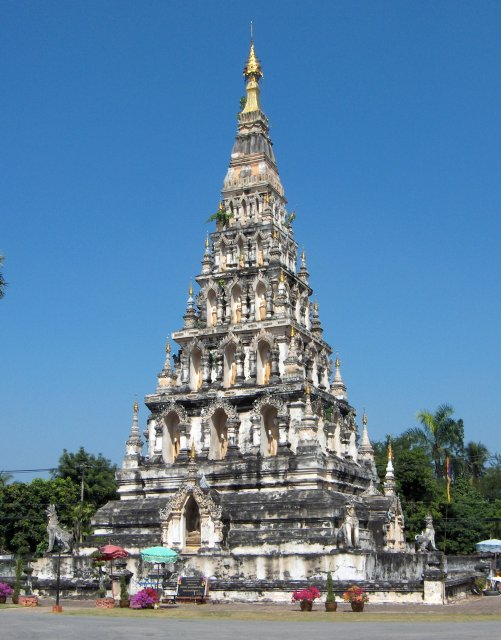
Wat Chedi Liam, Wiang Ku Kam. Photo by KayEss.

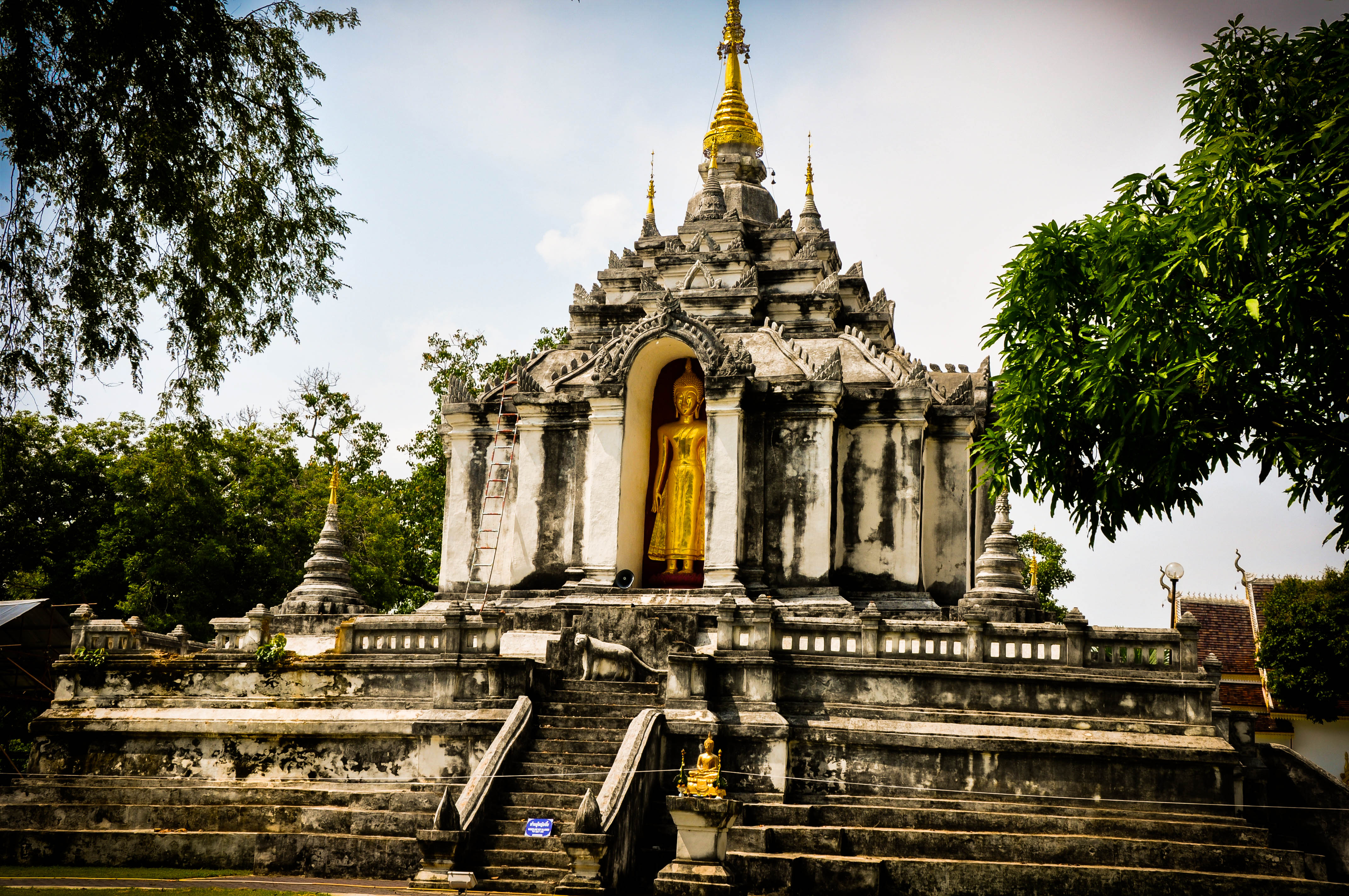
Wat Phra Yuen, Lamphun. Photo by นายพิชิต คำบุรี.

== Synopsis ==
1–9: Invocation and introduction. Date of composition; honoring the Triple Gem; dedication to his beloved, Thip.

10–27: Wat Phra Singh to the city gate. He visits twelve wat, including Wat Phra Singh and Wat Chedi Luang, and the shrine of King Mangrai; dedicates the merit made to Thip; notes the strength of the newly built gate.

28–32: From the city gate to the outer wall. He visits four more wat.

33–43: From the outer wall to Wiang Kum Kam. He describes the procession of bullock carts; describes many trees in bloom; feels lonely without his beloved.

44–83: Wiang Kum Kam to Banyan Market. He describes the tiered pagoda of Wat Ku Kham Luang (now Wat Chedi Liam) in Wiang Kum Kam; notes the shallowness of the dry-season river; admires girls playing in the stream; describes forest trees and birds; watches hunters burning the forest; visits two wat and comments on the number of ruins; reaches Banyan Market (unknown) which seems like a city in the forest; listening to birdsong at dusk increases his loneliness.

84–87: Overnight. He listens to music and storytelling; watches the forest come alive at dawn.

88–100: Day two, to Hariphunchai. He visits a wat with images of soldiers, and another occupied by Thai wayfaring monks; misses Thip and reaffirms his love; the way becomes hot and dusty.

101–110: Wat Phra That Hariphunchai, the reliquary. He comments on the newly built city walls; recalls the history of the city; describes and praises the reliquary; notes how crowded it is at all times.

111–145: Overnight. He contrasts his solitariness with courting couples; listens to singing and recitation; makes offerings at several places within the reliquary and dedicates the fruit to Thip and his own progress to nibbana; practices the eight precepts overnight; watches dancers, singers and acrobats; visits other shrines, including Sangkachai and a reclining Buddha.

146–158. Wat Phra Yuen. He notes that the wat is deserted; reflects on the five Buddhas of the current era; returns to the reliquary and is saddened by a tableau of the Buddha’s parinibbana.

159–166. The royal party. In the evening, he witnesses the king’s son and the queen arrive at the reliquary and praises her beauty; watches a firework display.

167–171. Departure. He stays awake in the reliquary overnight and makes final offerings to take leave.

172–179. He summarizes eight other tales of parted couples.

180–181. Afterword. He commends the work to others.

== The route ==
The journey begins on 18 February 1517 CE (Julian). He thus travels in the later part of the cool, dry season, when water in the river is low and many forest trees are in bloom.

Starting at Wat Phra Singh, he proceeds east along today’s Ratchadamnoen Road, south down today’s Phra Pokklao Road, out the Chiang Mai Gate, and south down today’s Suriwong Road to the outer wall, a total distance of 2.4 kilometers. Along the way he visits seventeen wat or shrines.

He proceeds southeast, passing no landmarks, to Wat Chedi Liam in Wiang Kum Kam, around 2.5 kilometers.

From Wiang Kum Kam to Hariphunchai-Lamphun, he probably follows the old course of the Ping River, now the Old Chiang Mai Lamphun Road, Route 106, a distance of 25 kilometers. He mentions only one reasonably likely landmark (now Wat Kong Sai), and two probable other locations. He overnights at an unidentified “Banyan Market”, probably about halfway, in Saraphi. François Lagirarde suggests a route somewhat to the west. The total trip was 30 kilometers.

The poem mentions only one overnight stay, suggesting the journey took two days. However, evening arrives when the party is at Wiang Kum Kam, and a first overnight stay around here may have gone missing from the narrative. Otherwise the first day would seem very long, given the number of temple visits and the likely pace of a large cavalcade of bullock carts.

== Places visited ==
Places visited in Nirat Hariphunchai
verse	Thai	Transcription	Modern name	Address	Coordinates
10	พระวรเชษฐช้อยศรีสิงห์	phra worachet choi si sing	Wat Phra Singh	Samlan Rd	18.7884, 98.9818
11	ปราสาท	prasat	Wat Prasat	Intrawarorot Rd	18.7897, 98.9811
12	ทุงยู	thung-yu	Wat Tung-yu	Ratchadamnoen Rd	18.7887, 98.9842
12	ศรีเกิด	si koet	Wat Si Koet	Ratchadamnoen Rd	18.7882, 98.9840
12	ปราเกียร	prakian	Wat Chi Prakiat	Ratchadamnoen Rd	18.7886, 98.9859
14	มังราข	mangrat	King Mangrai shrine	Phra Pokklao Rd	18.7888, 98.9882
15	กุฎราม	kutharam	Wat Chedi Luang	Phra Pokklao Rd	18.7869, 98.9865
15	อุปแปน	uppaen	disappeared		
16	มหาอาวาส	maha awat (great monastery)	Wat Chedi Luang	Phra Pokklao Rd	18.7869, 98.9865
19	พระเสฏฐ	phra settha	Wat Settharam	in Phutthisophon School	18.7858, 98.9891
19	ช่างแต่ม	chang taem (elephant artists)	disappeared		
20	เจ็ดลิน	jet lin	Wat Jet Lin	Phra Pokklao Rd	18.7837, 98.9880
21	ฟ่อนสร้อย	fon soi	Wat Fon Soi	Phra Pokklao Rd	18.7825, 98.9885
23	เชียงสง	chiang song	disappeared		
24	เชียงใหม่หม้าทวาร	chiang mai ma thawan (new Chiang Mai gate)	Chiang Mai Gate		18.7813, 98.9890
28	พันงอม	phan ngom	maybe Wat Chiang Khong, a ruined chedi	south side of Chang Lor Rd	18.7809, 98.9884
29	เถียงเส่า	thiang sao	maybe Wat Saen Sae	Suriwong Rd	18.7786, 98.9885
30	กุฎิคำ	kuti kham	Wat That Kham	Suriwong Rd	18.7774, 98.9886
31	น่างรั้ว	nang rua	Wat Yang Kuang	Suriwong Rd	18.7760, 98.9890
45	กู่คำหลวง	ku kham luang	Wat Chedi Liam	Wiang Kum Kam	18.7539, 98.9959
49	พระขวาง	phra khwang (Buddha blocking river)	maybe Wat Phra Non Nong Phueng	Nong Phueng	18.7386, 99.0124
67	ยางหนุ่ม	yang num (many yang trees)	Wat Kong Sai	Nong Phueng	18.7304, 99.0205
73	หัวฝาย	hua fai (dyke head)	Wat Hua Fai	Nong Phueng	18.7133, 99.0362
77	กาดต้นไร	kat ton rai	Banyan Market	unknown	
104	พระธาตุ	phra that (holy relic)	Wat Phra That Hariphunchai	Lamphun	18.5772, 99.0082
146	พระพุทธเจ้าจตุตน	phra phutthajao jatu ton (four Buddha images)	Wat Phra Yuen	Lamphun	18.5763, 99.0193

== Samples ==
In verse 31, he admires a wat now known as Wat Yang Kuang on Suriwong Road, Chiang Mai, and thinks of his beloved:

อารามเรียงรุ่นหั้น เงางาม
เป็นปิ่นบุรีนาม น่างรั้ว
บเห็นนาฏนงราม บวรสวาท สยบเอย
ทังขื่อชีพิตกั้ว โลกนี้นามนิพาน

a splendid wat here, bright and beautiful
the city’s pride, by name Nang Rua
not seeing lovely you, my loving heart will wilt
fear-fettered in this world life-long until nibbana

In verses 161, he admires a queen arriving at Wat Phra That Hariphunchai:

ธาดาอห่อยเนื้อ ทิพมาล
ไทงาศสันเฉลิมปาน แต่งแต้ม
อานาศาสตร์พันพาน เพิงแพ่ง งามเอย
ยลยิ่งนางฟ้าแย้ม ย่างย้ายลดาวัลย์

the mother-queen has skin as fine as nine-gold flowers 161
her face and coiffured hair seem like the moon
the cloth wrapped round her bosom’s fitly fine
her smile bests heaven’s maids, her walk is like a vine

== Academic study ==
Prasert na Nagara created the first annotated edition and proposed the date of 1517/8. His 1973 edition included a glossary of places and other items in the poem prepared by Wijit Yotsuwan.

Aroonrat Wichienkeeo made a proposal on the authorship and explained details of the places visited.

Kreangkrai Kirdsiri made a detailed study of the journey within Chiang Mai city.

Winai Pongsripian provided historical background to the poem and explained its importance for understanding the history and culture of Lan Na.

François Lagirarde used the poem to study the beliefs and practices of Buddhism in Lan Na in the past.

Lamoon Janhom wrote a thesis on the poem, discussing the dating, authorship and significance, and incorporated the findings in a broader study of local Lan Na literature.
