= Yuan Phai =

Historical epic Thai poem

- Author: unknown
- Original title: ยวนพ่าย
- Language: Thai
- Genre: Epic poem
- Publication place: Thailand

Yuan Phai (Thai: ยวนพ่าย, also known as Lilit Yuan Phai, ลิลิตยวนพ่าย, see below for details), "Defeat of the Yuan," is a historical epic poem in the Thai language. It tells of the rivalry between Ayutthaya and Lanna, and of the battle that ended it in 1474 or 1475 at the place then called Chiang Cheun at Si Satchanalai. The Yuan are the people of Lanna or Yonok, then an independent kingdom in the upper reaches of the Chao Phraya River basin with a capital at Chiang Mai. The poem was written to celebrate King Boromma Trailokanat of Ayutthaya (r. 1448–1488), the victor. The poem was probably written soon after the battle. It counts among only a handful of works of Thai literature from the Early Ayutthaya era that have survived, and may be still in its original form, without later revisions. The main body of the poem consists of 1,180 lines in a variant of the khlong (Thai: โคลง) meter. The poem is considered important as a source of historical information, as an example of poetic form and style, and as a repository of early Ayutthayan Thai language. A definitive edition was published by the Royal Institute of Thailand in 2001.

== Historical background ==
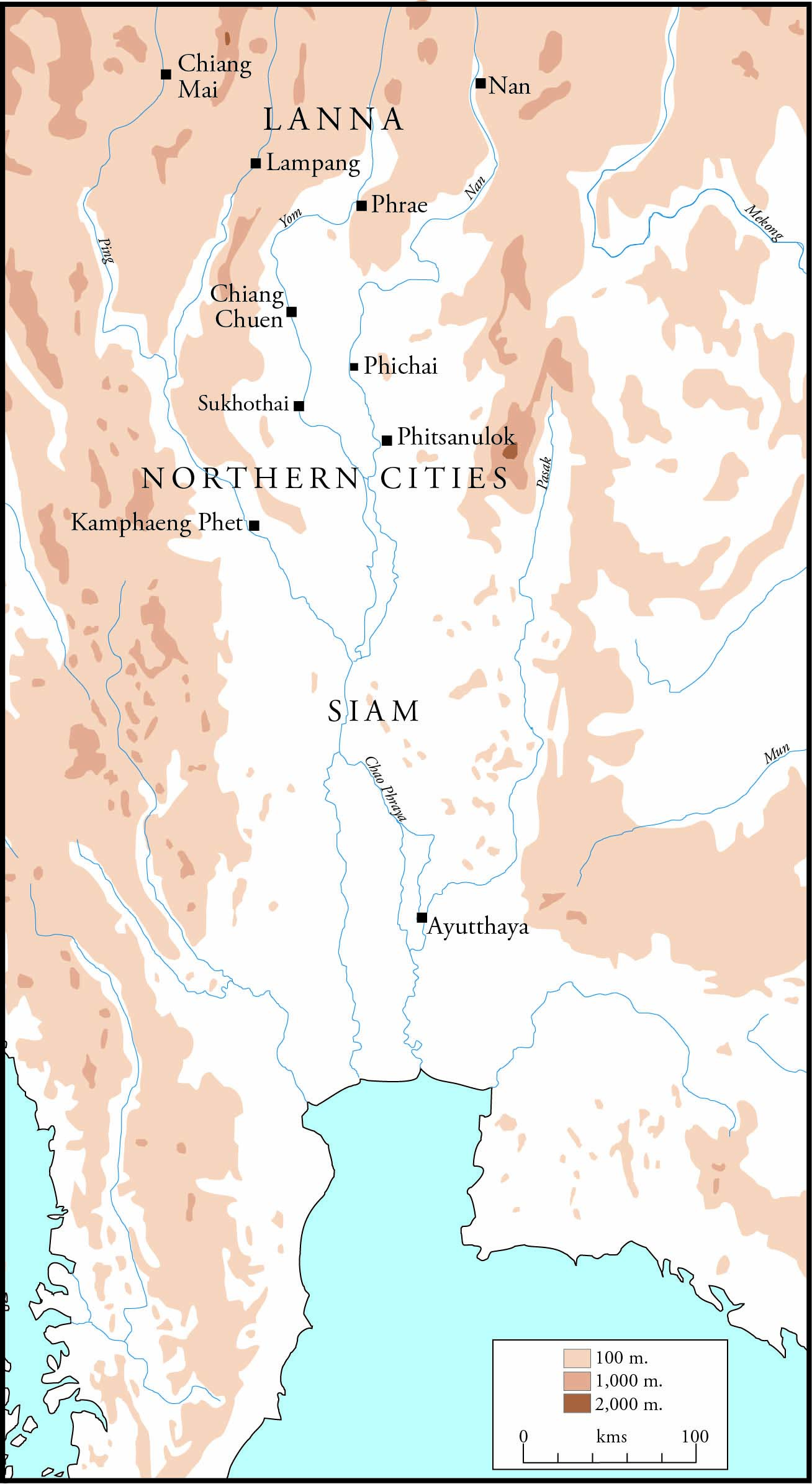
Map showing places mentioned in the poem

By the 14th century there were three centres of power in the Chao Phraya River basin. Lanna was a confederation of cities in the upper reaches, with a capital usually at Chiang Mai. Ayutthaya was a confederation of cities near the coast, with a capital at Ayutthaya from 1350. The old Sukhothai Kingdom held the middle reaches and was by then generally known as the Northern Cities (Thai: เมืองเหนือ Mueang Nuea), with a capital at Phitsanulok. From the late 14th century, Lanna and Ayutthaya vied to control the Northern Cities and thus dominate the whole basin.

Ayutthaya gradually absorbed the Northern Cities by a process that was largely peaceful. The Ayutthaya and Sukhothai ruling families exchanged marriage partners over several generations. People relocated between the two regions, particularly nobles from the Northern Cities absorbed into the Ayutthaya official nobility. The accession of King Trailokanat in 1448 was a significant step in this process as he was descended from the Ayutthaya and Sukhothai ruling families on the male and female side respectively.

Soon after this accession, Phraya Yutthisathian (Thai: ยุธิษเฐียร), a prince of the Sukhothai family, rebelled against Ayutthaya and took his followers to Chiang Mai. According to the Chiang Mai Chronicle, the two had been childhood friends in Phitsanulok, and Trailokanat had promised that on becoming king he would make Yutthisathian upparat, or deputy king, over the northern part of the merging domain. He reneged, and made him only governor of Phitsanulok. Possibly this story is the way the chronicle conveys a wider opposition to the creeping merger among the Sukhothai nobility.

King Tilokkarat of Chiang Mai (r.1441-1487) had already greatly expanded the Lanna domain by absorbing Phrae and Nan. Yutthisathian encouraged him extend his power over the Northern Cities, leading to a series of battles between Ayutthaya and Lanna over the next thirty years. In 1463, Trailokanat relocated his capital to Phitsanulok, probably as part of this struggle. The city of Chiang Chuen (Thai: เชียงชื่น; the name for Si Satchanalai under Lanna rule) became key to this struggle because of its strategic position on a route between Phitsanulok and Chiang Mai. Chiang Mai seems to have controlled the place from the late 1460s.

Although the poem presents the battle as a great victory, it did not settle the contest between Ayutthaya and Lanna over the Northern Cities which continued intermittently until the mid 16th century.

== Summary of the poem ==
The poem has four parts: a eulogy of King Trailokkanat (preamble and stanzas 1-60); a summary of key events from 1431 to c.1466 (stanzas 61–82); a main narrative of events from 1451 to the battle (stanzas 83 to 266); the battle and celebration of victory (stanzas 267 to 295).

=== The eulogy ===
The king's knowledge of Buddhism is presented through a one-to-nine series of numbered lists of Buddhist concepts. His skill in warfare is vaunted by comparison to the Hindu gods and characters from the Mahabharata. His other skills are celebrated include prediction of future events, literary composition and recitation, debating skills on religious issues, knowledge of history, and insight into the minds of others. The eulogy ends with the poet apologizing for his own shortcomings in composing the work.

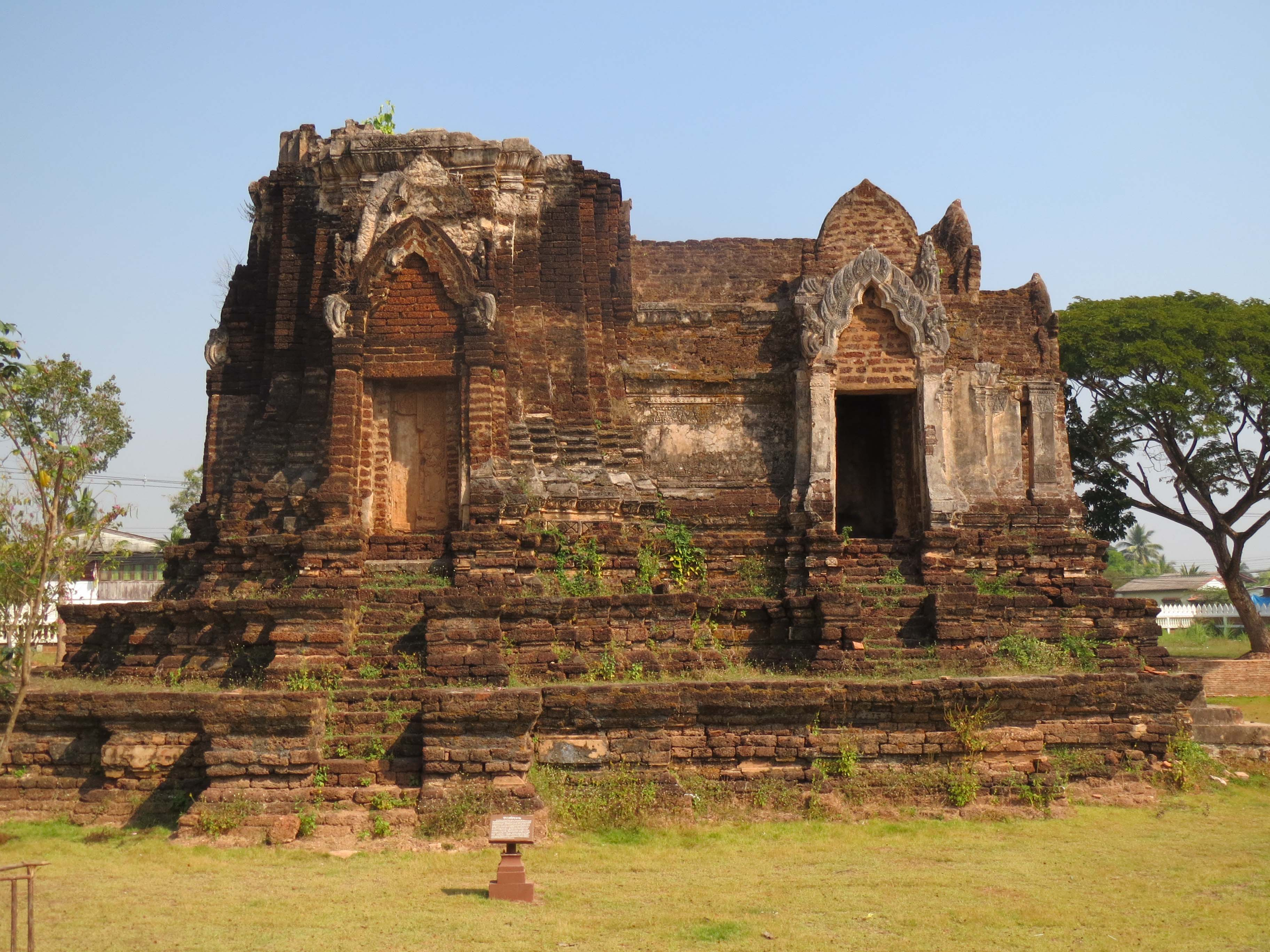
Wat Chulamani, Phitsanulok, where King Trailokanat was ordained in 1464

=== Summary of key events ===
King Trailokanat is born in 1431 when his father leads an army to Angkor. On accession, he builds a stupa for his father's remains. Yutthisathian rebels, and several skirmishes follow. On the death of his mother in 1460, Trailokanat relocates to Phitsanulok, and in 1464-6 is ordained at Wat Chulamani.

=== Main narrative ===
The same events are recapped in slightly greater detail (stanzas 83 to 104). King Tilokkarat of Chiang Mai is portrayed as a bad king for overthrowing his father, killing his own son, and foolishly mistreating Muen Dong Nakhon who he had sent to rule Chiang Chuen (stanzas 105–124). Muen Dong's widow appeals to Trailokanat for help. Troops from Tilokkarat's allies, Nan and Phrae, take control of Chiang Chuen, propelling many nobles and men to flee and join Trailokanat in Phitsanulok (stanzas 125–152). Tilokkarat appoints a new ruler in Chiang Chuen, Jae Hom, who readies strong defenses with reinforcements from Lampang (stanzas 153–174). Trailokanat readies his army at Phitsanulok, travels up the River Nan, and then marches towards Chiang Chuen (stanzas 175–201). The army is described, including the infantry (stanzas 203–210), the elephant brigade, portrayed in great detail (stanzas 211–248), the cavalry (stanzas 249–255), and the march (stanzas 256–266).

The narrative breaks off in the middle of describing the march and resumes in the thick of the battle. A section has been lost, inadequately substituted by a short insertion in prose.

=== Battle and celebration of victory ===
In the battle (stanzas 267–287) the Yuan forces at first gain the upper hand, through the number and weight of their elephants. The tide turns when an Ayutthaya elephant named Songbun wins an elephant duel (stanzas 272–3).

๏ ทรงบุญถอยเร่ร้น รุกแทง
ลาวแล่นเปรตายหัว ขวดขวํ้า
ขอเขนกระลึงแวง วยนมาตร
หอกช่วยเชองชักซ้ำ ซ่นไฟ ฯ

๏ ลาวหัวขาดห้อยติด คอสาร
ฟูมเลือดหลามไหลจร จวบจั้ง
พระเทพประหารหัก โหมเกลื่อน
เขนแนบเขนตาวตั้ง ต่อตาย ฯ

Songbun retreats, returns in fierce attack.
The Lao, in flight, head lopped, collapses down.
Troops swirl with saber, goad and shield. Sparks fly!
The pikemen cheer the tusker, "Thrust again!"

The Lao hangs headless down the tusker's neck.
His blood wells up and floods away till gone.
Phrathep Phrahan attacks. Men dies in droves.
Shield clashes shield. Sword hacks at sword till death.

Emboldened by this event, the Ayutthaya troops fight harder. The Yuan break and flee and are 'slashed down dead / like row on row of felled banana trees' (stanza 283). Victory is then celebrated (stanzas 288–295), beginning with lines on the people and property seized (stanzas 285, 287):

๏ เสียนางลเอ่งเนื้อ นมเฉลา
เสียสาตราวุธสรรพ์ ใช่น้อย
เสียพาลยพัฬเหา ทองแท่ง
เสียกั่นโทงถ้วนร้อย มาศเมลือง ฯ

๏ เชลอยลากลู่ม้า มือมัด
เขาเมื่อยจำจูงขาย แลกเหล้า
พระยศพ่อท่านทัด ไตรโลกย์
ดินหื่นหอมฟ้าเร้า รวดขจร ฯ

Their ladies, lustrous skin and bosoms—lost!
Their weapons, kit in no small measure—lost!
Their countless bars of gold and children—lost!
Their howdahs gilt and many tuskers—lost!

We tie up prisoners, drag them round by horse.
When tired, they're sold away or swapped for booze.
The King's repute, as great as all three worlds,
now spreads at speed, admired through earth and sky.

== Principal characters ==
=== King Boromma Trailokkanat ===
Yuan Phai is the only source of information that he was born in the year that his father, Borommaracha II or Sam Phraya, led an army to Angkor, which was 1431. Hence he was only 17 on ascending the throne in 1448. His regnal name, meaning 'refuge of the three worlds', is an epithet of the Buddha applied to several of the kings of Ayutthaya in this era. According to the chronicles, he received this name at a tonsure ceremony shortly before his accession.

His reign appears to have been remarkable. He gave the site of the old Ayutthaya palace to become Wat Phra Si Sanphet and built a new palace to the north. The structure of the nobility and administration was overhauled, though the details are subject to different interpretations. He composed or commissioned the Mahachat Khamluang, another early classic based on the Jataka story of Phra Vessantara. Several important laws in the Three Seals Code are dated to his reign, though these dates are not secure.

Around 1463, Trailokkanat moved to Phitsanulok and placed someone else, named Borommaracha in the chronicles, in Ayutthaya. This arrangement, in which the king along with a deputy or son occupied Ayutthaya and Phitsanulok as twin capitals was practiced intermittently from this time until the late 16th century. There are confusing and contradictory accounts of the latter part of the reign in various sources, but the authoritative Luang Prasoet Chronicle specifies that he died in Phitsanulok in 1488.

=== King Tilokkarat of Lanna ===
According to the Chiang Mai Chronicle, he was the sixth child of King Sam Phraya (also known as Samfangkaen) of the Mangrai dynasty in Lanna (the 'lok' part of his name means sixth). He became king in 1443 by deposing his father, and within a year had imposed control over Nan and Phrae. He also attacked Luang Prabang, Chiang Rung, and the Shan region several times but could not impose control. He faced several revolts. He had his favorite son, Bunruang, executed on suspicion of disloyalty. While clearly a warlike ruler, he was also a vigorous patron of Lankan-style Buddhism, building several monasteries including Wat Chet Yot and Wat Pa Daeng, and enlarging Wat Chedi Luang to house the Emerald Buddha.

=== Phraya Yutthisathian ===
He is possibly the only Thai historical figure named after a character in the Mahabharata. His year of birth is unknown but the Chiang Mai Chronicle describes him and Trailokkanat as "boyhood friends" so their ages may have been close. After he defected to Chiang Mai in 1451, he joined Tilokkarat in the campaigns into the Northern Cities through the 1450s. He was rewarded with the governorship of Phayao, and then also of Ngao and Phrae in 1459. After this he fades from the record. In 1476 he had a bronze Buddha cast with his name in the inscription. The piece is now in the Bangkok National Museum. He may have been executed in 1486 among the perpetrators of a failed plot against Tilokkarat, but the source is not clear.

== Theory of kingship ==
The opening stanzas of Yuan Phai are an early and important source for one of the main theories of kingship in Ayutthaya. Eleven gods combine to create the king. These eleven are the Hindu trinity of Brahma, Vishnu and Shiva plus the eight guardians of the cardinal and sub-cardinal directions from Indian tradition: Indra (as 'golden Meru's lord'), guardian of the east; Yama, lord of the dead, guards the south; Maruti, lord of the wind, northwest; Viruna, lord of the waters, west; Agni, fire, southeast; Kuwera, lord of the Asura demons, north; Suraya, sun, southwest; Isana, moon, northeast. This notion that eleven gods contribute divine substance to create a king appears in the chronicles at the 1605 coronation of King Ekathotsarot.

๏ พรหมพิษณุบรเมศรเจ้า จอมเมรุ มาศแฮ
ยำเมศมารุตอร อาศนม้า
พรุณคนิกุเพนทรา สูรเสพย
เรืองรวีวรจ้า แจ่มจันทร ฯ

๏ เอกาทสเทพแส้ง เอาองค์ มาฤๅ
เป็นพระศรีสรรเพชญ ที่อ้าง
พระเสด็จดำรงรักษ ล้ยงโลกย ไส้แฮ
ทุกเทพทุกท้าวไหงว้ ช่วยไชย ฯ

Brahma, Vishnu, Shiva, golden Meru's lord,
great Yama, fine Maruti on his horse,
Viruna, Agni, demon-chief Kuvera,
the sky-illuming sun and lustrous moon;

these gods eleven joined with one resolve
to make a holy Lord All-Knowing one
to come, protect, sustain and feed this world.
All gods vouchsafed to help Him to succeed.

== Geography ==
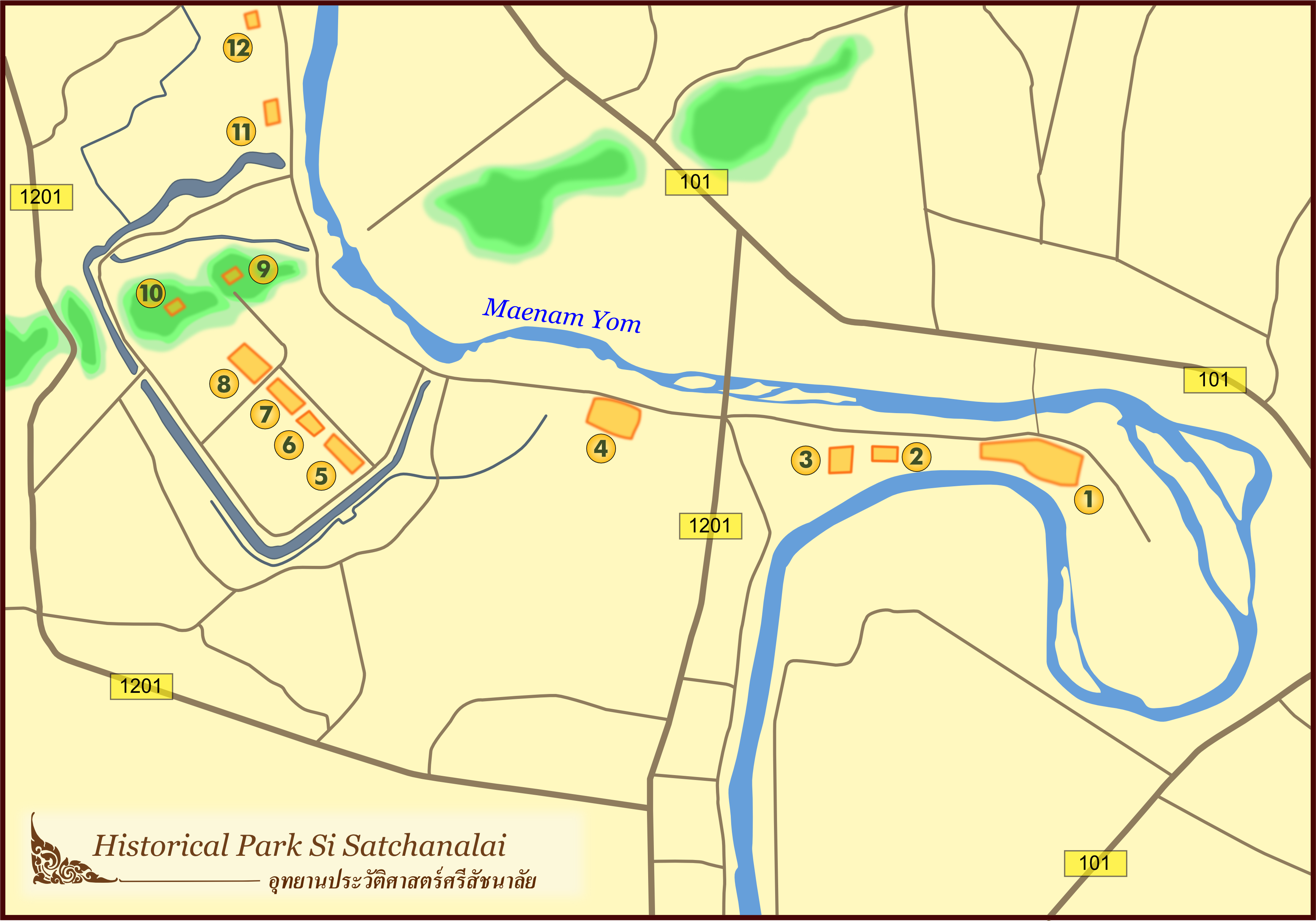
Map of Si Satchanalai Historical Park

In the poem, the town which is the site of the battle is called Chiang Chuen (Thai: เชียงชื่น) except in one place where it is called Cheliang (Thai: เชลียง). The identification of this location was uncertain; some believed it was at Long in Phrae province. The editor of the Chiang Mai Chronicle placed its Chiang Chuen there, which Michael Vickery noted would mean no connection with Chaliang. In 1968, MC Chand Chirayu Rajani proposed that Chiang Chuen was the site now known as Si Satchanalai, although he had never visited the place. In 1970 Chanthit Krasaesin showed that the geography sketched in stanzas 169-170 fits exactly with Si Satchanalai. The poem states that the town is screened by three hills, is flanked by rapids in the river and the Meng marsh on one side, and has a triple moat and laterite walls. The three hills, now known as Khao Yao, Khao Suwanakhiri, and Khao Phanom Phloeng, stretch across the north of the city. The rapids in the Yom River, now known as keng luang, the great rapids, are on the northeast side. The Meng marsh was probably to the southeast. The main moat can still be seen, and there are remaining stretches of laterite wall. Vickery likewise held that one descriptive passage in the poem certainly represents the old city.

The poem does not mention any buildings at Chiang Chuen.

== Genre and sources ==
Yuan Phai is the only martial poem to have survived from the Ayutthaya era. Indeed, there is nothing similar in the Thai language until Lilit Taleng Phai, Defeat of the Mon, composed in the 1830s with many borrowing from Yuan Phai, including the echo in the title.

Yuan Phai references several characters from the Mahabharata—Karna, Arjuna, Krishna, Bhima, Duryodhana—as well as naming the Pandava and Kaurava, the two warring clans in the Indian epic. Phraya Yutthisathian is apparently also named after a Mahabharata character. Possibly, the Mahabharata had become popular in Ayutthaya in this era, and was the inspiration for Yuan Phai.

== Form and meter ==
The poem was once generally known as Lilit Yuan Phai but this has been challenged. A lilit (Thai: ลิลิต) is a literary form which interleaves different forms of verse. However, virtually all of Yuan Phai is in one verse form. The only exception are a preamble and an insertion after stanza 264 to fill a lacuna in the story, both of which are probably later additions. On these grounds, the Royal Institute of Thailand titles the work as Khlong Yuan Phai, where khlong (Thai: โคลง) is the form of verse used. Chanthit Krasaesin and Chonlada Rueangraklikhit prefer Yuan Phai Khlong Dan where dan (Thai: ดั้น) is a subcategory of the khlong verse form.

The main meter used is khlong bat kunchon, (Thai: โคลงบาทกุญชร, an elephant-foot khlong). Each stanza has four lines, and each line is five syllables with a two to four syllable tailpiece. Rhymes link one of the two final syllables in the line to the 4th or 5th syllable in the line next but one, crossing stanza boundaries throughout the poem. At certain positions in the stanza, the syllable must have a first or second tone mark (Thai: ไม้เอก ไม้โท).

This latter rule indicates that the verse was composed before the great tone shift in the Tai family of languages. Before that shift, there were only three tones, indicated by one of these two tone marks, or their absence. The meaning of the tone marks prior to the shift is unknown, but most likely an unmarked syllable was a mid tone while the first and second tone marks probably indicated low and high tones respectively. With unmarked, first, and second tones represented as da, do, and di respectively, a typical line (the exact position of the tone-marked syllables may vary slightly) can be represented as follows:

     da   da   da   da   di       da   da   da   da
     da   do   da   da   da       da   di
     da   da   da   da   da       da   da
     da   do   da   da   di       do   da

The preamble and insertion following stanza 264 are in rai (Thai: ร่าย) meter. Two stanzas following stanza 124 are believed to have been composed by Phraya Trang in the early 19th century to fill a lacuna and are not included in the numbering scheme. A stanza 294 appeared on the end in some earlier additions but is now considered a late addition and omitted.

== Date and authorship ==
As the poem is written to glorify King Trailokanat, most authorities agree that it was written before the end of his reign (1488) and probably very soon after the battle. MR Suphawat Kasemsi proposed that the author was a monk named Panya Phaisan whose name appears in stanza 58 as Thai: เบญญาพิศาล. Wipha Konkanan proposed that the author was female on grounds that a female pronoun is used, but others consider this unlikely. Phra Borihan Thepthani proposed that the author was a son of King Trailokanat who spent a long time in the monkhood as Phra Suriyawong. Prince Damrong Rajanubhab accepted that the authorship cannot be known for sure.

Vickery called the poem "allegedly 15th-century". It describes the laterite walls of Chiang Chuen, and he held that those walls, whose gun ports he dated to the 16th century at the earliest, cast doubt on the received date of the poem. He noted that A. B. Griswold had once dated the walls to the 16th century and changed his view after studying the poem.

== Manuscripts and publications ==
The National Archives of Thailand has 24 samut thai manuscripts of all or part of the poem. However, all clearly stem from a single original as the content and obvious lacunae are the same; they differ in spelling and wording.

In 1970, Chanthit Krasaesin (Thai: ฉันทิชย์ กระแสสินธุ์) produced a critical edition of the poem with details on the variations in different manuscripts and his interpretation of each stanza in modern Thai prose. In 1976, A. B. Griswold and Prasert na Nagara published an article in English setting the poem into its historical context, using material culled mainly from the Ayutthaya and Chiang Mai chronicles. They provided a rough translation of around half the stanzas, largely following Chanthit, and a summary of the rest.

In 2001 the Royal Institute of Thailand produced an edition based on Chanthit's format, with many reinterpretations devised by a 19-member committee. As many words are obscure, and parts of the manuscript may have been corrupted by damage or faulty copying, the committee offered alternative readings of several lines.

== English translations ==
The poem has been translated into English by Thailand's National Team on Anthology of ASEAN Literatures (คณะทำงานโครงการรวมวรรณกรรมอาเซียนประเทศไทย). The translation is featured in the Anthology of ASEAN Literatures of Thailand, Volume II a (วรรณกรรมอาเซียน ประเทศไทย เล่ม ๒ เอ), first published in 1999.

In 2017, Chris Baker and Pasuk Phongpaichit published an English verse translation.

== Legacy ==
Yuan Phai had a formative influence on a later tradition of royal-panegyric literature in Thai including works in praise of King Naresuan, King Prasat Thong, King Narai, King Taksin, and King Rama I.

Taleng Phai (ตะเลงพ่าย, "Defeat of the Mon"), an epic poem composed by Prince Paramanuchitchinorot, is modelled on Yuan Phai.
