= Lamphun =

Lamphun ลำพูน ᩃᨻᩪᩁ
- Town
- เมืองลำพูน ᨾᩮᩬᩥᨦᩃᨻᩪᩁ
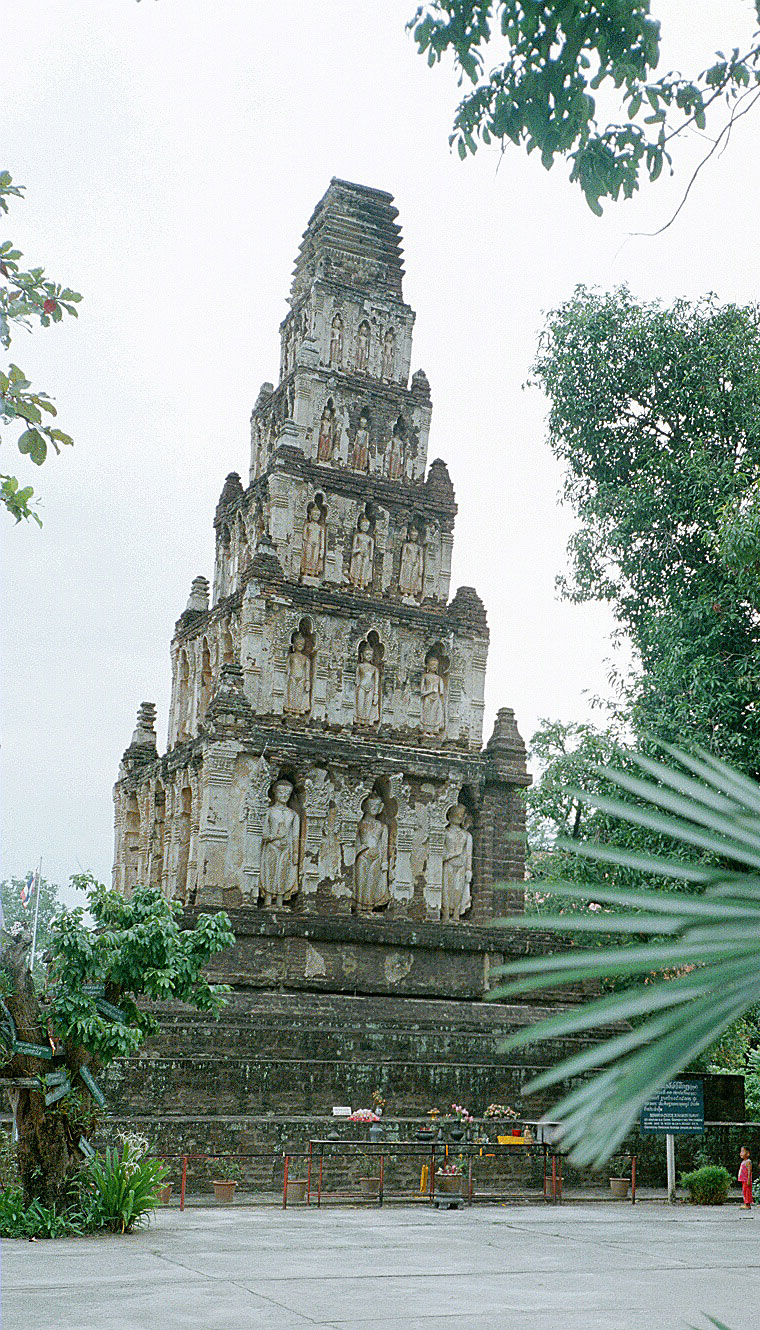
- Square chedi, Lamphun

- Location within Thailand
- Coordinates (Municipality office): 18°35′11″N 99°0′43″E
- Country: Thailand
- Province: Lamphun

Government
  - Type: Town municipality
- Time zone: ICT

Lamphun
- "Lamphun" in Thai language (top) and Northern Thai with Tai Tham script (bottom)

Thai name
- Thai: ลำพูน
- RTGS: Lamphun

Northern Thai name
- Northern Thai: ᩃᨻᩪᩁ (La Phu)

Lamphun (Northern Thai: ᩃᨻᩪᩁ; Thai: ลำพูน, pronounced [lām.pʰūːn]) is a town (thesaban mueang) in northern Thailand, capital of Lamphun province. It covers the whole tambon Nai Mueang of Mueang Lamphun district. As of 2006 it has a population of 14,030. Lamphun lies 665 km (413 mi) north of Bangkok and 19 km (12 mi) south of Chiang Mai.

== History ==
Lamphun was founded by Queen Chama Thevi as the capital of the Haripunchai Kingdom, the last and most northerly Mon kingdom in the area which now forms Thailand. Around 25 km (16 mi) south of Chiang Mai, it was constructed in the shape of a conch shell, following the Khuang River on its east side and divided by moats at the remaining points of the compass.

Queen Chama Thevi is remembered in the wat of her name, Wat Chamadevi, which is said to be the resting place of her ashes. Near the town's main morning market in the south-west of the city is a statue of the queen at which offerings are still made today by citizens.

While still living in the north King Mangrai was visited by some merchants from the Mon Kingdom, and hearing of the wealth of Lamphun he determined to conquer it, even against the advice of his councillors.

As it was deemed impossible to take the city by force, he sent a skillful merchant called Ai Fa to gain the confidence of the King Yi Ba, and in time he became the chief minister and managed to undermine the king's authority.

In 1281, with the people in a state of discontent, Mangrai defeated the Mon Kingdom, and added the city and its wealth to his kingdom, while Yi Ba, the last king of Hariphunchai, was forced to flee south to Lampang. Lamphun was then incorporated into the new Lanna Kingdom. Ai Fa was subsequently appointed king, and King Mangrai began building the fortress Wiang Kum Kam as his new capital.

Lamphun is host to one of northern Thailand's most important temples, Wat Phra That Hariphunchai, featured on the reverse of the one-satang coin. The phra that in the title indicates the presence of a Buddha relic, in this case one of his hairs, which was interred in the chedi in 897, which is probably the founding date of the wat.

The town is surrounded by lush countryside punctuated by rice fields and orchards of the popular fruit, longan, which is celebrated in a festival every August.

== Geography ==
The town is in the Ping River valley, between the Thanon Thong Chai Range on the west and the Khun Tan Range in the east.

=== Climate ===
Climate data for Lamphun (1991–2020, extremes 1981-present)
| Month | Jan | Feb | Mar | Apr | May | Jun | Jul | Aug | Sep | Oct | Nov | Dec | Year |
|---|---|---|---|---|---|---|---|---|---|---|---|---|---|
| Record high °C (°F) | 35.7 (96.3) | 38.8 (101.8) | 41.7 (107.1) | 43.6 (110.5) | 44.0 (111.2) | 40.8 (105.4) | 40.2 (104.4) | 37.8 (100.0) | 35.5 (95.9) | 35.8 (96.4) | 35.5 (95.9) | 34.7 (94.5) | 44.0 (111.2) |
| Mean daily maximum °C (°F) | 30.8 (87.4) | 33.9 (93.0) | 36.7 (98.1) | 37.9 (100.2) | 35.4 (95.7) | 33.8 (92.8) | 33.1 (91.6) | 32.5 (90.5) | 32.4 (90.3) | 31.8 (89.2) | 31.1 (88.0) | 29.7 (85.5) | 33.3 (91.9) |
| Daily mean °C (°F) | 22.1 (71.8) | 24.5 (76.1) | 27.8 (82.0) | 30.1 (86.2) | 29.0 (84.2) | 28.5 (83.3) | 28.0 (82.4) | 27.4 (81.3) | 27.1 (80.8) | 26.2 (79.2) | 24.4 (75.9) | 22.1 (71.8) | 26.4 (79.6) |
| Mean daily minimum °C (°F) | 14.9 (58.8) | 16.1 (61.0) | 19.8 (67.6) | 23.5 (74.3) | 24.3 (75.7) | 24.5 (76.1) | 24.3 (75.7) | 24.0 (75.2) | 23.6 (74.5) | 22.4 (72.3) | 19.4 (66.9) | 16.0 (60.8) | 21.1 (69.9) |
| Record low °C (°F) | 7.8 (46.0) | 9.2 (48.6) | 12.5 (54.5) | 17.0 (62.6) | 18.2 (64.8) | 21.1 (70.0) | 21.0 (69.8) | 20.8 (69.4) | 19.1 (66.4) | 13.8 (56.8) | 9.3 (48.7) | 3.5 (38.3) | 3.5 (38.3) |
| Average precipitation mm (inches) | 8.5 (0.33) | 4.4 (0.17) | 17.3 (0.68) | 52.4 (2.06) | 165.6 (6.52) | 123.0 (4.84) | 129.6 (5.10) | 193.9 (7.63) | 210.8 (8.30) | 111.2 (4.38) | 36.2 (1.43) | 9.0 (0.35) | 1,061.9 (41.81) |
| Average precipitation days (≥ 1.0 mm) | 0.8 | 0.6 | 1.6 | 3.9 | 11.1 | 10.6 | 11.2 | 14.0 | 13.5 | 9.3 | 2.9 | 1.0 | 80.5 |
| Average relative humidity (%) | 70.4 | 59.9 | 54.6 | 58.0 | 71.1 | 84.8 | 76.5 | 80.1 | 83.0 | 82.4 | 78.6 | 75.2 | 72.1 |
| Average dew point °C (°F) | 15.6 (60.1) | 14.9 (58.8) | 16.4 (61.5) | 19.8 (67.6) | 22.5 (72.5) | 23.2 (73.8) | 23.1 (73.6) | 23.4 (74.1) | 23.7 (74.7) | 22.7 (72.9) | 20.0 (68.0) | 16.9 (62.4) | 20.2 (68.4) |
| Mean monthly sunshine hours | 272.8 | 274.0 | 294.5 | 279.0 | 198.4 | 117.0 | 120.9 | 117.8 | 144.0 | 182.9 | 216.0 | 254.2 | 2,471.5 |
| Mean daily sunshine hours | 8.8 | 9.7 | 9.5 | 9.3 | 6.4 | 3.9 | 3.9 | 3.8 | 4.8 | 5.9 | 7.2 | 8.2 | 6.8 |
Source 1: World Meteorological Organization
Source 2: Office of Water Management and Hydrology, Royal Irrigation Department (sun 1981–2010)(extremes)
