= A. B. Griswold =

American historian (1907–1991)

Alexander Brown Griswold
- Born: April 19, 1907; Baltimore, Maryland, U.S.
- Died: October 4, 1991 (aged 84)
- Education: Princeton University; Trinity College, Cambridge
- Occupations: Art historian; banker
- Employer(s): Alex. Brown & Sons, Cornell University
- Known for: Work in Thai art history and epigraphy

Alexander Brown Griswold (19 April 1907 – 4 October 1991) was an American art historian, known for his work in Thai art history and epigraphy. Born into an established banking family of Baltimore, he became acquainted with Thailand while serving in the army during World War II, and developed an interest in the country's history and culture, thereafter dedicating himself to the study of its history and archaeology. Griswold's early work mostly focused on stylistic analyses of the religious sculpture of Sukhothai and Lan Na, and by the 1960s he had become recognized as an expert authority on Thai traditional art, particularly in the area of sculpture. He was an adjunct professor at Cornell University, and amassed a large collection of Thai art and antiques at his home near Baltimore, which was opened to the public as a museum. His later work shifted in focus to the study of ancient inscriptions, and he co-authored the landmark "Epigraphic and Historical Studies" series with Prasert na Nagara from 1968 to 1979.

== Early life and career ==
Alexander Brown Griswold was born on 19 April 1907 to an established banking family of Baltimore. His father, Benjamin H. Griswold Jr., was a great-great-grandson of Alexander Brown, the founder of Alex. Brown & Sons, the first investment banking firm in the United States. Griswold grew up in Baltimore, graduating school from the Gilman School in 1924. He studied art and architecture at Princeton University, graduating with honors in 1928, and did post-graduate work in architecture at Trinity College, Cambridge before returning to join the family firm in 1930, becoming a partner the following year (and senior partner following his father's death in 1946).

Griswold served in the US Army during World War II, and was assigned to the Office of Strategic Services (OSS)—the precursor to the CIA. The OSS conducted operations in Thailand assisting the Free Thai resistance movement, and Griswold was parachuted into the country during the final stretch of the war in 1945. He reached the rank of lieutenant colonel, and was awarded the Bronze Star for his service.

Following this introduction to the country, Griswold developed a keen interest in Thai history and culture, and from 1948 dedicated himself to the study of Southeast Asian history and archaeology. He was mostly self-taught, and received guidance from French historian-archaeologist George Cœdès, Bangkok National Museum curator Luang Boribal Buribhand and his friend Pierre Dupont.

== Academic work ==
Seated Buddha image in maravijaya posture, Sukhothai style. Part of Griswold's personal collection, donated to the Walters Art Museum.

Griswold's early work mostly focused on stylistic analyses of the religious sculpture of Sukhothai and Lan Na, culminating in the publication of Dated Buddha Images of Northern Siam in 1957, which was controversial at the time for introducing a novel periodization approach that contradicted the traditional view. The same year, his criticism of Anna Leonowens's portrayal of King Mongkut, which had recently been adapted into the film The King and I, made headlines in the United States.

Griswold became active in academia from the late 1950s; he was elected to the board of the Baltimore Museum of Art in 1956, and set up a museum wing (open once a month to the public) at Breezewood, his residence in Monkton, Baltimore County, the same year. He established the Breezewood Foundation to sponsor scholarship in the subject area in 1957, and joined the editorial board of the Artibus Asiae in 1958. By the mid-1960s, he had become recognized as an expert authority on Thai traditional art, particularly in the area of sculpture, and was invited to join Cornell University's Southeast Asia Program as an adjunct professor of the history of art in 1964; he retired from his position at Alex. Brown & Sons the same year. For over a decade following, he would annually host the Breezewood Seminar, a spring study retreat attended by Cornell graduate students, at his country home. He also maintained a residence in Bangkok, where he hosted French art historian Jean Boisselier for an extended period in 1964.

In the late 1960s, Griswold's focus shifted to the study of ancient inscriptions, and from 1968 to 1979 he co-wrote, with Prasert na Nagara, twenty-four papers under the "Epigraphic and Historical Studies" series for the Journal of the Siam Society, which made detailed analyses of significant inscriptions, particularly from Sukhothai. The series is regarded as a landmark study in the field, described by Thailand historian David K. Wyatt as an achievement without parallel "in all the scholarship on the epigraphy of Southeast Asia".

Griswold's health deteriorated in the 1980s, and he died on 4 October 1991. His collection of about 300 works of art had been donated to the Walters Art Gallery in 1987; his library and another portion of his collection had earlier been donated to Cornell University.
