= Ten Bodhisattas =

Future Buddhas

Ten Bodhisattas refer to ten future Buddhas during their lives as bodhisattvas. They have also been referred to as successors of Gautama Buddha.

== In Dasabodhisattuppattikathā ==
Dasabodhisattuppattikathā ("Ten Bodhisattva Birth Stories" or "Lives of the Ten Bodhisattvas") is a Pali Buddhist text that deals with ten future Buddhas during their lives as bodhisattvas. It is a "strange small work of late Pali literature" and "the only example of a book devoted entirely to extolling the Bodhisattas who will be Buddhas in future ages."

There are several recensions to the text, all of which were consulted in the publishing of Saddhātissa's book. Despite frequent differences in vocabulary, they agree in the arrangement and content of the stories. Each story is about a virtuous person near the end of his or her cycle of rebirths. Each character has lived a meritorious life and dies through some self-inflicted act, often gruesome, which serves as an offering to the universal Buddha. Each will be reborn one final time and attain full Buddhahood.

== In Sotattakī ==
In the Sotattakī Scripture, one of the exclusive texts to the Pali Canon, Ānanda asked Gautama Buddha about the people who were practising to achieve the Buddhahood. Gautama Buddha answered that there will be 10 future Buddhas. The Bhodhisattas are introduced as:

"Metteyyo Uttamo Rāmo, Paseno Kosalobibū, Dīghasoṇīca Caṅkīca, Subo, Todeyya Brahmano. Nāḷāgirī Pālileyyo, Bodhisatthā imedasa anukkamena sabhodiṁ, pāpuṇissanti nāgate".

which can be translated as:

"The 10 people who will gain enlightenment in the future are: The noble Maitreya Buddha, King Uttararama, King Pasenadi Kosala, Abhibhū, Dīghasoṇī, Caṅkī (Candanī), Subha, a Brahmin named Todeyya, an elephant named Nāḷāgirī and the king of elephants Pālileyya. They will become the Future Buddhas in such order"

== The 10 Bodhisattas ==
=== Maitreya ===
According to the Anāgatavamsa, Maitreya Buddha was a monk disciple named Ajita. One day, Gotamī offered a golden robe to Gautama and his disciples. As no disciple accepted it, Ajita accepted the offering. The monk crowd were not satisfied as they felt that the robe was dedicated to the Buddha. In order to prove that Ajita is his successor, Gautama Buddha hid his emerald alms bowl and told his disciples to help retrieve it. Only Ajita was able to retrieve his bowl. After getting his alms bowl back, Gautama Buddha explained to his disciples that Ajita would become the next future Buddha. He also had told the future biography of Maitreya as Sāriputta requested for it. After getting the omen, Ajita donated Gotami's robe as the ceiling of the monastery. Maitreya is currently residing at the Tushita realm.

=== Uttararama ===
In the time of the Kassapa Buddha, King Uttarāma was a young man named Nārada. When he saw the Buddha, he thought it worthwhile to give his life for the Buddha. And he burnt himself, like a torch. Then the Buddha Kassapa foretold that Nārada would be the future buddha.

After Maitreya Buddha died, there will be 100,000 Sunya-Kalpas. After the 100,000 Sunya-Kalpas, there will be a Maṇḍa-Kalpa. In the Maṇḍa-Kalpa, he will become Rāma Buddha (Rāmasambuddha Buddha).

=== Pasenadi ===
King Pasenadi of Kosala was an Upāsaka of Gautama Buddha who frequently invited him and his disciples to his palace for meals and listened to the Dhamma. According to the Anāgatavamsa, he will become the fourth future Buddha.

=== Abhibhū ===
Abhibhū Buddha will be born in the next Sārā-kalpa, which will be formed a few Sunya-Kalpas later. After Abhibhū Buddha dies, there will be another 100,000 Sunya-Kalpas.

=== Dīghasoni ===
In the newly formed Kalpa, Dīghasoni asurin (Rahu Asurin), a deva, will become a Buddha first.

=== Caṅkī ===
Caṅkī (Candanī), a Brahmin, will become a successor of Dīghasoni.

=== Subha ===
According to the Majjhima Nikāya of the Pali Canon, Subha was the son of Todeyya.

When Gautama Buddha visited Subha's house, his pet dog barked continuously. As soon as he revealed the past of the dog, it ran away in fear. When Subha knew about the matter, he went to the Buddha to disprove his statements. However, he only told him to ask his pet about the possessions he buried in the past life. As they could find the hidden possessions, Subha began to respect him and to do donations for his father.

Another time, Subha asked the Buddha seven questions about the difference between humans. Having got satisfactory answers, he decided to become a devoted Buddhist and to practise Pāramitā. The Buddha did not see an omen, so their practice to gain enlightenment was not complete.

=== Todeyya ===
Todeyya was a rich Brahmin during the time of Gautama Buddha. Despite the wealth, he did not manage to donate his possessions and hid them instead. Because of his obsession, he became a pet dog of Subha in the afterlife.

=== Nāḷāgiri ===
Nāḷāgiri was the elephant that was used by Devadatta to murder Gautama Buddha. It was fed sixteen pots of alcohol and ordered to fight the Buddha. When it was rushing towards him, he gently soothed the drunk elephant. He then began to preach some Dharma.

After preaching, the elephant was tamed and paid respect to Buddha, then gradually walked away. Gautama Buddha did not give him the omen but had told him to follow the Five precepts. It also had got another name, "Danapāla".

=== Palileyya ===
Gautama Buddha once left alone to the Palileyaka village due to the conflict between his disciples. The villagers built a monastery for him at the Rakkhita forest which was near their village.

Meanwhile, an elephant named Palileya (Burmese: ပလလဲ) left his family because he felt cramped. He thought that living alone would be a solution. Then, he met the Buddha at his monastery. The Buddha told him about the benefits of solitude.

In the Jinatthapakāsanī (The explicit life of Buddha) written by Kyee Thel Lay Htet Sayadaw, Palileya looked after the Buddha. He usually guarded while he was sleeping. He gave a lot of fresh fruits to him and followed him to the village during alms. He had taken care of him for the Vassa(three months). After three months, Gautama Buddha had to leave him. He told him that he was not ready to practise for enlightenment. Palileyya died of grief. In the afterlife he became a Deva named Palileyya in the Tāvatiṃsa realm.

According to the Hmannan Yazawin of Myanmar, it is believed that the Bagan Kings, Thamoddarit, Anawrahta and Kyaswa are the future lives of Palileyya. King Myet-Hna Shay of Prome was also believed to be another afterlife as he spent most of his time mediating at a pagoda.
