= Prasert na Nagara =

Thai scholar (1919–2019)

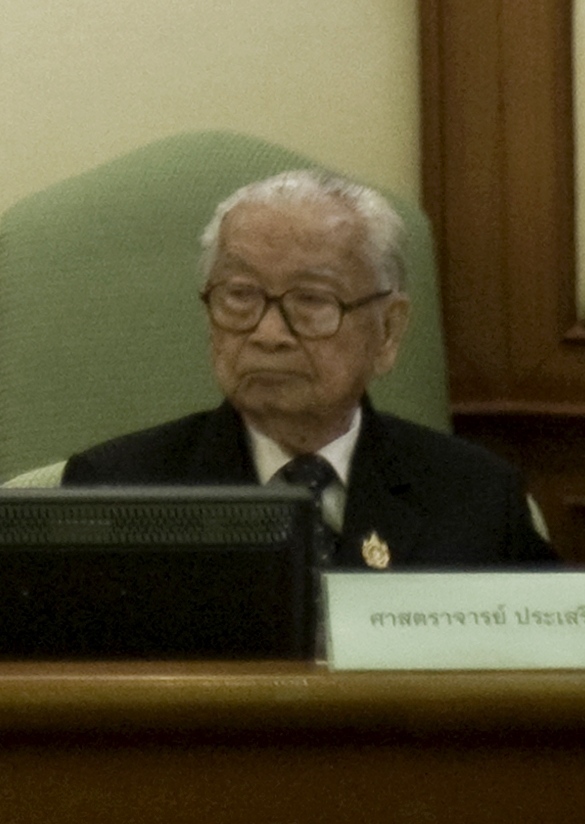
Prasert na Nagara (2009)

Prasert na Nagara (Thai: ประเสริฐ ณ นคร, RTGS: Prasoet Na Nakhon, pronounced [prā.sɤ̀ːt náʔ ná(ʔ).kʰɔ̄ːn]; 21 March 1919 – 7 May 2019) was a Thai scholar. Best known for his studies of ancient Thai inscriptions, he was formally trained in engineering and statistics, subjects which he taught as a professor at Kasetsart University. He served as vice president at the university and as Permanent Secretary of the Ministry of University Affairs. His influential work in history, archaeology and linguistics include the history of the Sukhothai Kingdom as well as the structure of the Tai language family.

== Life and work ==
Prasert was born in Phrae in Northern Thailand and descended from the family that had ruled in Nakhon Si Thammarat until the 19th century. His father was a civil servant in the Ministry of Finance who at that time worked in Phrae. Prasert attended the prestigious Suankularb Wittayalai School in Bangkok and won a government scholarship to study agricultural engineering at the University of the Philippines Los Baños, where he graduated with a bachelor’s degree in 1938.

He became a lecturer at the Bang Khen Agricultural College (which in 1943 became the Kasetsart University) and the Northern Agricultural Teachers Training School at Mae Cho (now the Maejo University). He completed a master’s degree and a doctorate in statistics at Cornell University in 1953 and 1957 respectively. In 1960 he was appointed professor at the Kasetsart University and in 1964 became its Vice President. From 1972 until his retirement in 1979, he served as Permanent Secretary of the Bureau of University Affairs. He was chairman of the university councils of both Kasetsart and Maejo University.

Without formal training in history, Prasert began studying historical texts during his leisure time in 1943. While at Cornell, he started reading transcriptions of stone inscriptions by George Cœdès and later taught himself ancient Khmer, ancient Thai, and other ancient languages of the region. In 1964 he first contacted Cœdès, at that time the prime authority in his field, who appreciated Prasert's suggestion of an alternative reading of a certain passage. In 1960 he published an edition of the 16th-century Northern Thai poem Nirat Hariphunchai. In the same year, he attended a meeting in Sukhothai which was the first modern archaeological seminar in Thailand and started Prasert's career in Thai history. On that occasion he met the American art historian A. B. Griswold, who became Prasert's steady partner in the study of ancient inscriptions. From 1968 to 1979, they published a series of Epigraphic and Historical Studies in the Journal of the Siam Society (JSS), comprising 24 articles that were later collected in one 821-pages volume published in 1992.

Prasert was a member of the Council of the Siam Society from 1965 to 1971 and later its honorary member. In 1988 the National Research Council of Thailand awarded him the title of "Outstanding National Researcher" (philosophy class). He was a member of the Royal Institute of Thailand (history section) and from 1999 to 2000 president of the Institute. Despite his expertise on Sukhothai or early Thai history, he never wrote a whole book on it, rather considering himself the presenter of raw material for other historians to interpret.

In addition Prasert was a poet who wrote the lyrics to several songs composed by Thai king Bhumibol Adulyadej as well as the Kasetsart University song and the anthem of the Asian Games. His song Fak Rak won a Golden Record in 1966.

Prasert Na Nagara was married twice and had a son and a daughter (one child from each marriage).
