= One-satang coin =

Currency unit

One satang
- Thailand
- Value: 0.01 Thai baht
- Mass: 0.5 g
- Diameter: 15 mm
- Edge: Plain
- Composition: Aluminium; 99% Al
- Years of minting: 1908–Present
- Catalog number: -

Obverse
- Design: King Vajiralongkorn
- Designer: Vudhichai Seangern
- Design date: 2018

Reverse
- Design: Royal Monogram of King Vajiralongkorn
- Designer: Chaiyod Soontrapa
- Design date: 2018

The Thailand one-satang coin (1 st. or 1 สต.) is a currency unit equivalent to one-hundredth of a Thai baht. It is rare in circulation but used in banking transactions.

The first satang coin was issued from 1908 to 1937, and featured a hole through the middle. It was made of bronze and measured 22mm in diameter, weighing 4.6g. It bore the name of King Rama VI. A coin in the same design was minted in 1939 with the name of King Rama VIII, and had a mintage of 24.4 million. In 1941 the design of the coin changed, although it was still bronze with a hole. The diameter changed to 20mm and the weight to 3.5g.

The hole was removed in 1942 as the coin's composition became tin, reducing its weight to 1.5g and the diameter to 15mm. Only issued in 1942, it had a mintage of 20.7 million. The design was changed on the coin, although it retained its specifications, in 1944. This coin had an issue of 500,000.

The coin then fell out of circulation. It was reintroduced in 1987 as an aluminium coin weighing 0.5g and measuring 15mm in diameter. This was the first one-satang coin to feature a portrait of a monarch, King Rama IX, which was sculpted by Wuthichai Saengngoen. A commemorative was released in 1996 to mark 50 years since of the reign of Rama IX, with a front-facing portrait of the King at his succession. In 2008, the current portrait of the King was inserted on the obverse.

== Evolution of 1 satang ==
Evolution of 1 satang

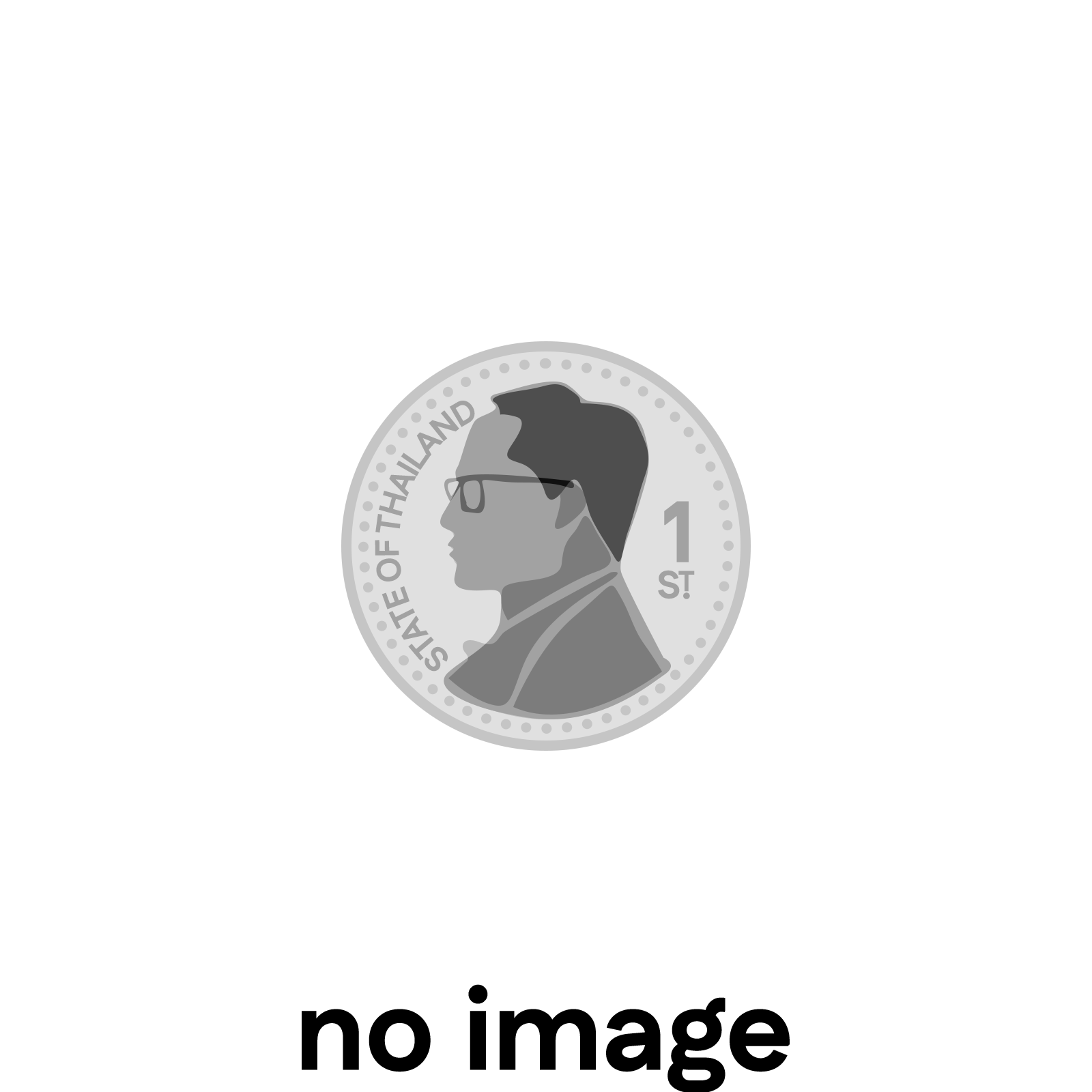
1987

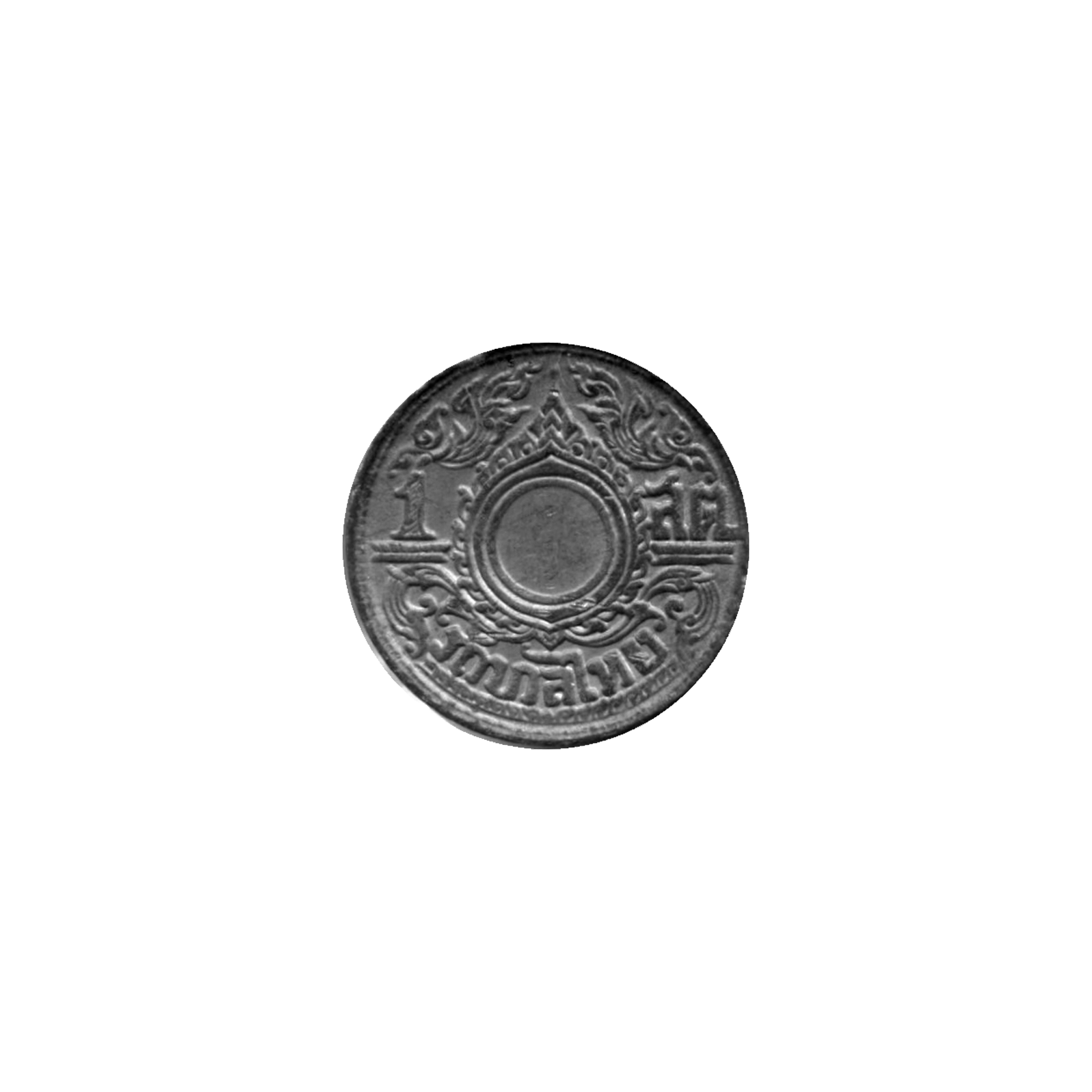
1944

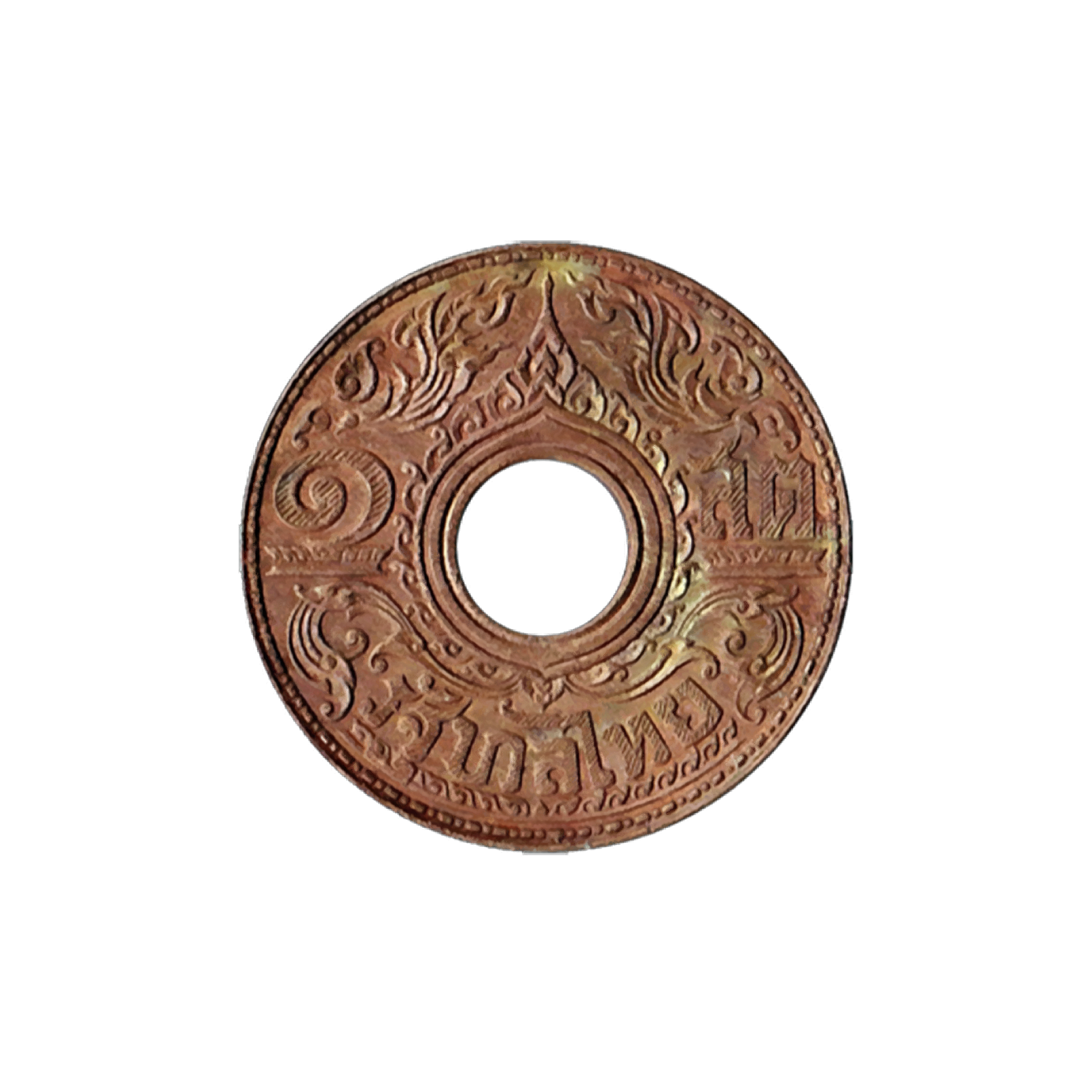
1941

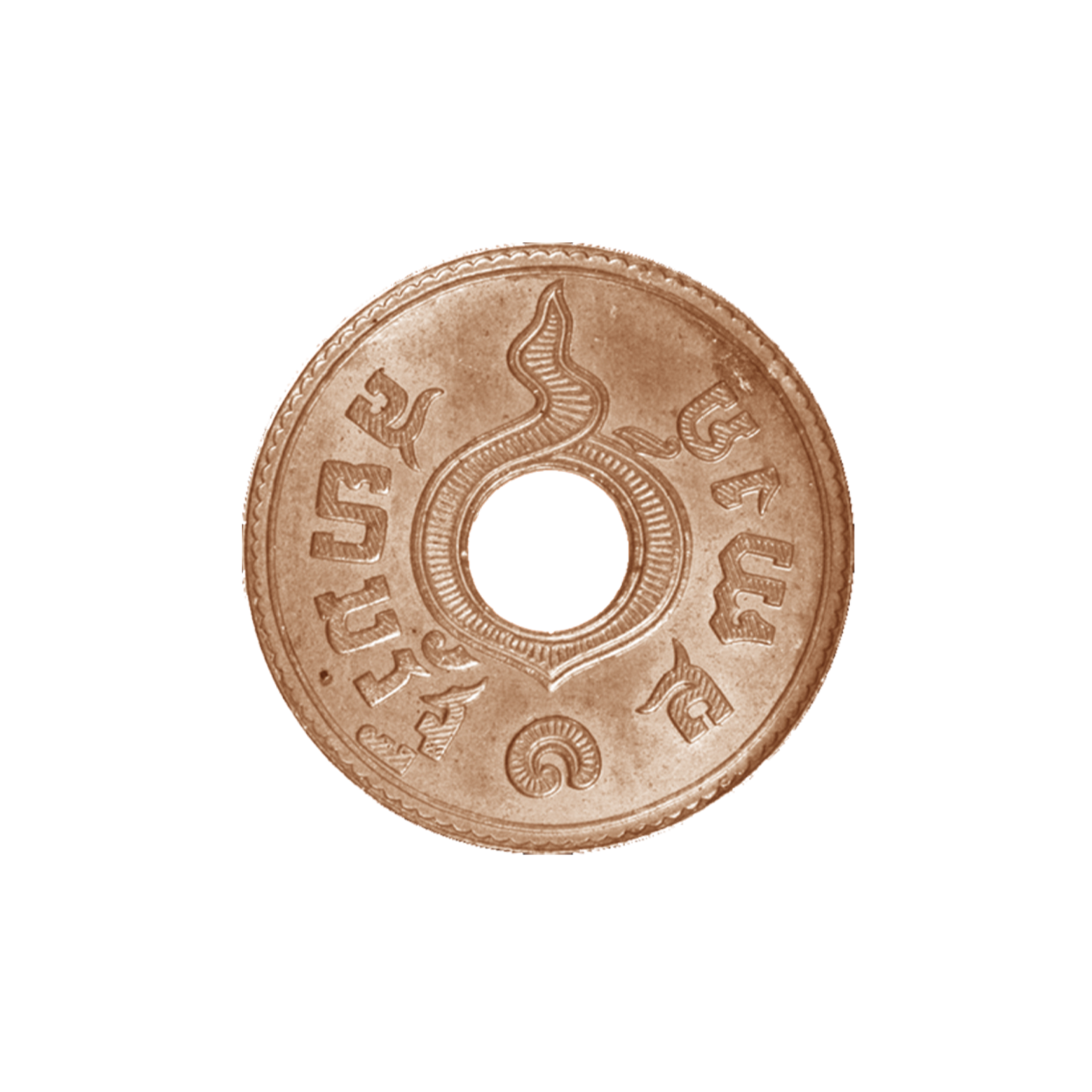
1908

== Buying Power ==
Since the satang only extend back to 1908, and due to the currency being non-decimal prior to this point, descriptions of how much a satang could buy starts from the reign of Rama VI.

=== 1910-1925 ===
Rice with various curries (green, red, etc.) costs 1 satang per set. A bowl of noodles also costs 1 satang. Water was free. Soda and sweet drinks costs 1 satang per bottle. Cigarettes (3 to 7 sticks) costs 1 satang depending on the branding.

=== 1925-1935 ===
Rice and curries, along with noodles now costs 3 satang. A whole box of cigarettes costs 3 satang also. Though, 1 satang food set still exists.

== Mintages ==
- 1987 ~ 93,000
- 1988 ~ 200,000
- 1989 ~ 109,000
- 1990 ~ 191,050
- 1991 ~ 25,000
- 1992 ~ 61,000
- 1993 ~ 126,000
- 1994 ~ 500,000
- 1995 ~ 500,000
- 1996 - 0
- 1997 ~ 10,000
- 1998 ~ 10,000
- 1999 ~ 20,000
- 2000 ~ 10,000
- 2001 ~ 50,000
- 2002 - 0
- 2003 ~ 10,000
- 2004 ~ 10,000
- 2005 ~ 20,000
- 2006 ~ 3,000
- 2007 ~ 10,000
- 2008 ~ 10,000
- 2009 ~ 10,000
