= Thawathotsamat =

15th-century Thai poem

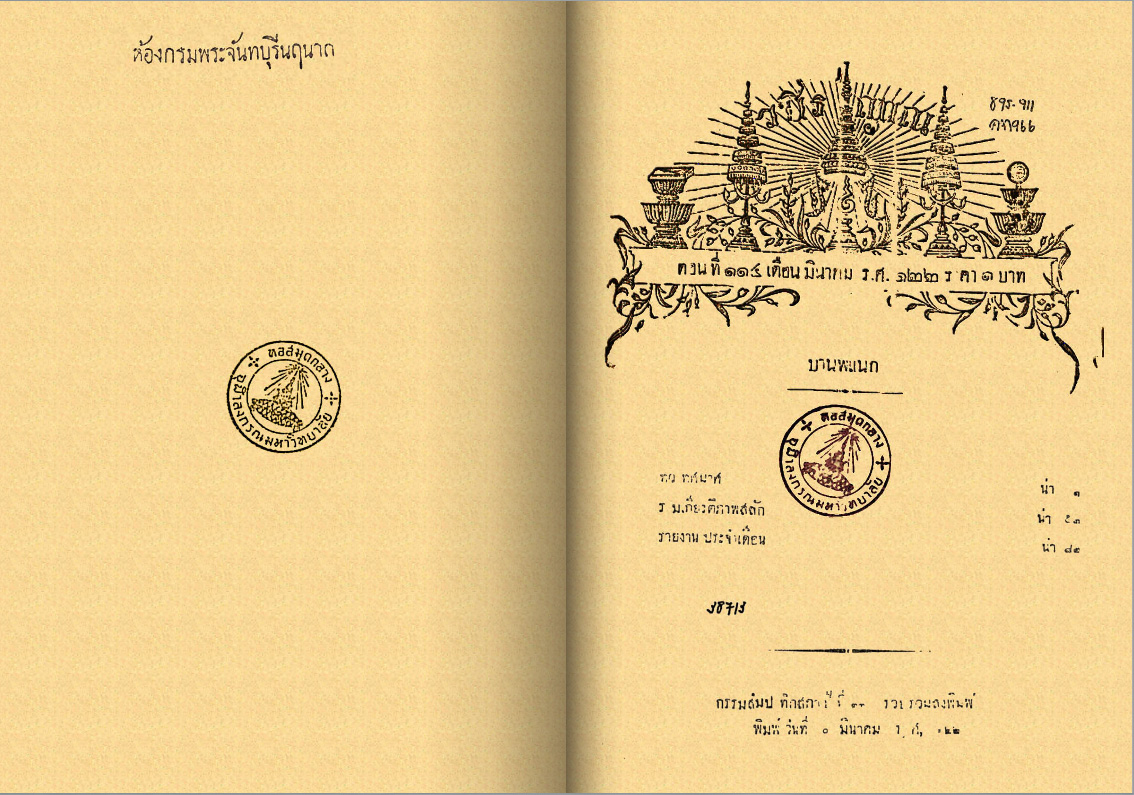
Title page of the first printing of the 15th-century Thai poem "Thawathotsamat" in 1904. The cover page is lost.

Thawathotsamat (Thai: ทวาทศมาส, pronounced [tʰā.wāː.tʰót.sā.mâːt]; lit. 'Twelve Months') is a poem of 1,042 lines in Thai, probably composed in the late fifteenth century CE. The title is a Thai adaptation of the Pali-Sanskrit words dvā dasa māsa, two ten months. The male speaker laments over a lost lover through the course of one year, drawing on the seasonal weather for similes of his emotions. Both the speaker and beloved are addressed with royal forms. A late verse declares that the poem was written by a "young-king" with the help of three court poets. The work has sometimes been mistakenly classified as a treatise on Siamese royal ceremonies. The work is less studied and less well-known than other early works of Thai literature, partly because of the obscurity of its archaic language, and partly because of conservative concerns over its erotic passages. A new annotated Thai edition appeared in 2017.

== Dating and authorship ==
Early attempts to date the work ranged from the fifteenth to seventeenth century, but there is now a rough consensus that it was written in or around the reign of King Trailokanat (1448–?1488).

Verse 258 states that a yaowarat (Thai: เยาวราช), "young-king" composed the whole work with the help of three men whose titles suggest they were official court poets.

กานทกลอนนี้ตั้งอาทิ	กวี หนึ่งนา
เยาวราชสามนตไตร	แผ่นหล้า
ขุนพรหมมนตรีศรี	กวีราช
สารประเสริฐฦๅช้า	ช่วยแกล้งเกลากลอน ฯ

the cantos of this verse by one sole poet were composed
the young-king who's beside three worlds
illustrious Khun Phrom-montri, Si Kawirat
and San Prasoet helped polish up the verse

Forms of address used throughout the poem confirm that the author was royal. The phrase "three worlds" may be a reference to King Trailokanat, whose name means "refuge of the three worlds." Around 1463 CE, he moved to Phitsanulok to conduct wars against Lan Na, and elevated a relative to rule in Ayutthaya with the title Boromracha.

Trongjai Hutangkura and Winai Pongsripian propose that the author was this Boromracha, probably a younger brother of King Trailokanat, who succeeded him as king in 1488 CE.

Gilles Delouche proposes that the author was an unnamed son of King Trailokanat who appears in the poem Yuan Phai traveling to Sri Lanka to invite Sinhalese monks to attend his father's ordination as a Buddhist monk.

According to Chinese records, King Trailokanat, abdicated around 1480-1482 and elevated a son named Intharacha as king. This son may have been the author.

== Texts, publications and translations ==
The National Library of Thailand holds nine manuscript versions of Thawathotsamat in the form of samut thai or samut khoi accordion books, of which only three are complete. All appear to stem from a single original, though there is a great deal of minor variation that has probably arisen in the process of copying.

In 1904, a text of Thawathotsamat was printed in Vajirañāṇa (Wachirayan), the journal of the Vajirañāṇa Library, and reprinted as a booklet in 1904 or 1905. This printing used an incomplete manuscript, omitting from v. 230 onwards.

In 1925, Thawathotsamat was printed as a cremation book with a preface by Prince Damrong Rajanubhab and the seal of the Vajirañāṇa Library on the title page. This and all subsequent printings used the complete text.

In 1962, Chulalongkorn University printed the text of Thawathotsamat under a policy "to print books of literature, which have not been widely printed and distributed, for use in the Faculty of Arts," using a text prepared by Prince Sommot Amoraphan (1860-1915), with no annotations.

In 1969, an annotated edition by Chanthit Krasaesin (Thai: ฉันทิชย์ กระแสสินธุ์) was printed by Trimit Press.

In 2017, an annotated edition prepared by a team including Trongjai Hutangkura, Winai Pongsripian and Samoe Bunma was published by the Princess Maha Chakri Sirindhorn Anthropology Centre.

Under an ASEAN literature project, Maneepin Phromsuthirak published an edition with a version in modern Thai in 1996, and an English translation (done with Panit Boonyavatana) in 1999. Winai Pongsripian contributed an English translation to the 2017 edition by Trongjai Hutangkura.

== Structure and themes ==
The poem is set in Ayutthaya, the old capital of Siam. The speaker laments over a lost lover through a calendar year. The beloved is also of royal status. She is addressed with royal forms, and named as Si Julalak (Thai: ศรีจุฬาลักษน, Sanskrit: śrī cuḷalakṣana), the official title of one of the king's four primary consorts according to the Three Seals Law.

Structure of Thawathotsamat
No.	Section	Verses
1	Invocations	1–5
2	Preface: love remembered	6–20
3	Literary comparisons	21–27
4	Twelve months (9–28 verses per month)	28–228
5	Retrospect and summary	229–250
6	Closing invocations	251–260

The poem begins and ends with invocations of the gods and the king, a convention found in much old Thai poetry. The opening invocation calls on the main Hindu gods but makes no mention of the Buddha.

The third section mentions couples in six other literary works with a theme of love lost and regained. The couples are: Rama and Sita; Aniruddha and Usa; Samuddaghosa and Vindumati; Sudhana and Manohara; Pacitta and Arabimba; and Sudhanu and Cirappa. Similar passages are found in other works, including Nirat Hariphunchai.

After the invocations, the speaker recalls their lovemaking in the past. This is the most erotic passage of the poem.

The main portion of the poem is structured over a calendar year, beginning in the fifth month of the old Thai calendar, equivalent to March-April. Each month serves as a canto with an opening and sometimes a closing verse.

The year of Thawathotsamat
Month in the Thai calendar	Thai (where used in the text)	Pali name	Modern calendar	First verse	Number of verses
5	เจตร, jet	Citra	March–April	28	22
6	ไพศาข, phaisak	Vesākha	April–May	50	8
7	เชษฐ, chet	Jeṭṭha	May–June	58	10
8		Āsāḷha	June–July	68	14
9		Sāvana	July–August	82	13
10	ภัทรบด, phatrabot	Bhadda	August–September	95	15
11	อาสยุช, atsayut	Assayuja	September–October	110	16
12	กรรดึก, kantuek	Kattika	October–November	126	15
1	มฤค, maruek	Māgasira	November–December	141	19
2	บุษยา, butsaya	Phussa	December–January	160	28
3		Māgha	January–February	188	25
4		Phagguṇa	February–March	213	16

The weather is used as metaphor and simile for the speaker's emotions. The poem begins in the hot season with images of fierce sunlight, searing heat, parched land, and withered vegetation. The image of the fire which incinerates the universe at the end of a Buddhist era appears repeatedly throughout the work. From the second month, the monsoon storms, lowering skies, and rumbling thunder are metaphors for his turmoil and tears. The brightening of the sky at the close of the rains parallels the easing of his distress.

The speaker compares his beloved to the moon, its beauty, purity, and inconstancy. He notes, "you crossed sky's rim and failed to rise again" (v.94).

The speaker accuses many gods of having abducted his beloved. The gods named include Indra, Brahma, Yama, Surya, Kama (the god of love), Vayu (wind), Varuna (rain), and Phaisop (the spirit of rice). He offers the gods a bribe of "a hundred thousand maidens" for her return (v.77).

In the second month (December-January), the speaker describes a firework display. The sights and sounds of the fireworks serve as a metaphor for his inner turmoil. The ephemeral nature of the fireworks, the intensity of sound and color that is so startling and then so quickly gone, seems to mirror the intensity of their love followed by the finality of his loss.

The speaker is visited by graphic memories of her body and illusions of seeing her in the present day.

The speaker repeatedly wonders whether his separation from the beloved is the working of karma, the result of bad deeds in a former life (v. 76, 80, 100, 163).

The absence of the beloved is never explained. Perhaps she has died. Yama, the god of death, is one of the deities accused of taking her away. The speaker makes merit and shares the merit with her (v. 137, 228), a practice for assisting the passage of a deceased to a future life. He wishes to be reunited with her in a future life (v.228).

After the close of the calendar year, there is a retrospect which summarizes the main themes of the poem, and ends on a note of reconciliation and optimism (v. 259):

ทวาทศสิบสองมี	สังเวจ
สังวาสเกษมสุขเท้า	ทั้วหล้าเสวยรมย

this Twelve is twelve of wretchedness
but love and happiness are found throughout the world

== Poetic form ==
The work is written in the khlong meter except for the final six lines which are in rai. Most verses use the wiwitthamali (Thai: วิวิธมาลี) variant of khlongdan si (โคลงดั้นสี่). The phrasing is extremely terse, perhaps imitating the Pali-Sanskrit verse that literati would have studied at the time. The work uses many archaic words drawn from Khmer, Lan Na Thai, and Sanskrit.

The work has sometimes been classified as a nirat, a travel poem incorporating a love lament.

The author may have taken some inspiration from Sanskrit literature, especially Kālidāsa's Meghadūta or "The Cloud Messenger."

== Critical appraisal ==
The work was cited in the 17th-century literary manual, Jindamani, as an exemplar of khlong poetry.

In the early 19th century, the poetry was praised by two leading authors, Phraya Trang and Nai Narintharathibet.

Plueang na Nakhon, the pioneer historian of Thai literature, wrote: "Poets of later generations when dealing with love and loss did not stray from the ideas laid down by Thawathotsamat.

Chanthit Krasaesin wrote that, for a Thai poet, "not having read Thawathotsamat is like not yet having entered the world of literature."

Maneepin Phromsuthirak concluded that "the author of Thawathotsamat composed this work mainly to be a manual of poetics."

Yet since the early 20th century, the work has been less studied than other early works of Thai literature, and is now much less known. There has been only one thesis on the work and, until recently, only one academic article.

In 1973, Duangmon Paripunna completed a master's thesis at Chulalongkorn University on "The Beauty of Thawathotsamat." An abbreviated version was published as an article.

In 2005 Maneepin Phromsuthirak, editor and translator of the poem for the ASEAN project, published an article on "Thawathotsamat: Nirat or Manual of Poetics" in a Silpakorn University journal.

According to Samoe Bunma, this neglect arose partly because of the work's obscure language and partly because "people call it ‘erotic literature' (Thai: สังวาสวรรณกรรม, sangwat wannakam) as it deals with inappropriate matters such as the private organs of men and women, and uses words for erotic effect in some verses. This is too much for Thai society, even though the poet disguises these with double meanings that the modern reader may not understand."

The 2017 annotated edition by Trongjai Hutangkura included three academic articles on the work by Trongjai Hutangkura, Samoe Bunma, and Sasithorn Sinvuttaya.

== Royal ceremonies ==
Several royal ceremonies are mentioned or alluded to. The poem has sometimes been mistakenly classified among treatises on royal ceremonial. Sujit Wongthes wrote that "Thawathotsamat is literature for ceremonies of the royal court.… it is not literature to be read for pleasure." Yet the ceremonies are part of the background, and the mentions are mostly very brief. This classification probably arose because some works on royal ceremonies, collectively known as the Royal Ceremonies of the Twelve Months, have the words thawathotsamat or "twelve months" in their title.

Royal Ceremonies in Thawathotsamat
Month	Ceremony	Wording in the poem	Explanation	1st verse
8	rains-retreat	พรรษา, phansa	Buddhist merit-making	71
10	Sarada	ศารท, sat	A harvest festival, also honoring the consorts of Hindu deities	97
11	Assayuja	(description only)	A ritual boat-race	111
12	chasing the waters	ไล่ชล, lai chon, chase the waters	A ceremony to lower the flood waters to facilitate the harvest	128
12	Jong Priang	โคมถวาย, khom thawai, offering lanterns	"Raising fat," a lantern festival probably derived from Karthikai Deepam same like Tamil Triyampawai	130
1	kite flying	ดูว่าว, du wao, watching kites	Flying kites to summon the seasonal wind	149
1	Trīyampawāi	ตรียามพวาย, triyamphawai	Propitiation of Siva; the Swinging Festival	154
2	Flower Anointment	บุษยาภิเษก, butsayaphisek	A re-enactment of the ceremony of royal installation, including a head anointment (murathaphisek) and fireworks	160
3	Sivaratri	ไตรเพท, trai phet, Triple Veda	A celebration of Siva by a ritual washing of the lingam	197
3	rice deity	ส่งพระไพสพ, song phra phaisop, sending the rice deity	Propitiating the rice deity to secure a good harvest	203
3	Thanya tho	(description only)	ธานยเทาะห์, thanyatho, Sanskrit: dhānya daha, burning rice; a harvest festival with prediction of the coming season	204
4	Cutting the year	(description only)	สัมพัจฉรฉินท์, samphatcharachin, Pali: saṃvacchara chinda, cutting the year. Ceremony of year end	216
