= Botan =

Botan may refer to:

== Places ==
- Botan River, a tributary of the Tigris River in southeastern Turkey
- Bohtan (Cizre Botan), a medieval Kurdish principality

== People ==
- Botan Rojhilat (born 1961), Kurdish military commander of the Kurdistan Workers' Party (PKK)
- Supa Sirising (born 1945), Thai author, pen name Botan
- Shishiro Botan, Japanese virtual YouTuber

== Other uses ==
- Peony (Japanese and Thai: botan)
  - Botan Rice Candy, a brand of traditional rice-based Japanese candy
- Botan (programming library), a BSD-licensed crypto library written in C++
- Botan, the name of Kyou Fujibayashi's pet piglet in the visual novel Clannad
- Botan (YuYu Hakusho), a fictional character in the anime and manga series YuYu Hakusho

== See also ==
- Bohtan Neo-Aramaic, a modern Eastern Neo-Aramaic language
