= Chananya Techajaksemar =

Thai YouTuber

Point of View
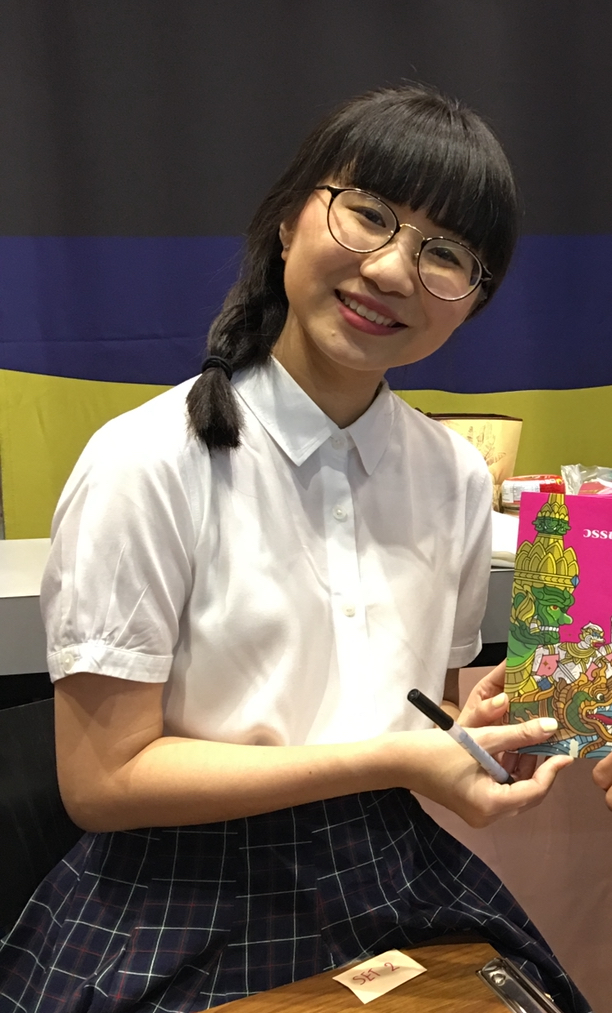
- Chananya in 2019
- Born: Chananya Techajaksemar; July 20; Bangkok, Thailand
- Other names: วิว; วิว ชนัญญา; View, Point of View; Point of View
- Education: Chulalongkorn University Demonstration School; Chulalongkorn University (B.A.)
- Occupations: YouTuber; Writer; TV Host; Content creator

YouTube information
- Channels: PointofView; pointofviewkids; JudChomView
- Years active: 2009–present
- Genres: Storytelling; Education; Literature; History; Language; Travel
- Subscribers: 3.82 Subscribers
- Last updated: 16 Fubuary 2026
- Website: pointofviewontour.com

Chananya Techjakrasema (born 20 July), nickname View, is a Thai content creator and YouTuber known for her storytelling on the channel Point of View and as a writer. She has been creating general videos since 2009 and began producing edutainment storytelling content on 1 October 2012. Additionally, she is the author of several books, including the best-selling pocketbook Thai Literature Digest, which presents Thai literary works in an accessible modern language.

Currently, she continues to offer both entertaining and informative content through various social media platforms, including YouTube, Facebook, Instagram, and TikTok.

== Education ==
Chananya was born into a Thai-Chinese family and attended Demonstration School of Chulalongkorn University (CUD; Primary Section) for her elementary education. She has mentioned in interviews that she has had a strong passion for literature since childhood, reading both literary and historical works. While studying at CUD (Secondary Section), her desire to become a writer, coupled with the rising popularity of online literature websites at the time, led her to start publishing her writings online. During her high school years, she enrolled in the Science-Mathematics program. Her friends frequently asked her to summarize Thai language and literature content due to her outstanding language skills within her science-mathematics group, leading her to realize her enjoyment of storytelling.

Chananya graduated from CUD, Class of 44 and continued her higher education at Faculty of Arts, Chulalongkorn University, majoring in Thai Language under the Phuak Chang Project (a program admitting individuals with exceptional skills in Thai language and literature for undergraduate studies), graduating with a Bachelor of Arts with Second Class Honors. During her university studies, Chananya began submitting her novels to various publishers but did not achieve publication.

== Early works ==
Chananya participated in several international children's art festivals in Japan, where she was one of four Thai children to win the gold medal.

Additionally, she competed in a royal trophy-winning youth marching band competition during her high school years.

== Career ==
Chananya began working part-time while still a student, including proofreading, designing, and writing articles. Later, she used Twitter to summarize literary content for review, gaining popularity. However, due to Twitter's character limit, she decided to start recording video summaries of literature and uploading them to YouTube. Her first video was on Lilit Phra Lo, which received positive feedback, leading her to continue creating and sharing storytelling videos on YouTube. Chananya has mentioned in interviews with The Standard (Thai multimedia news outlet) that she is a "talkative person" who enjoys sharing knowledge and that her role as a YouTuber has supported her education.

After graduation, Chananya had opportunities to work full-time in various roles but did not remain in any position long-term, as she continued to take freelance work, write books, and present content on social media. Her roles included working with Microsoft as a content writer for Bing News, DTAC in social media management, and The Cloud as a social media editor. Ultimately, Chananya decided to leave her full-time positions to focus fully on her career as a content creator. She later mentioned in an interview with The Cloud that she preferred the flexibility of content creation over regular office work. Jiradej Obasaphan Wongphaphap Theeraphan Leelawan Suk

In 2016, Chananya was selected to participate in the YouTube NextUp program, which supports content production on YouTube through workshops and funding. This decision led her to focus more on presenting stories through social media.

Additionally, Chananya has hosted the educational show "Sanook Kid," which focuses on social sciences for primary school students, broadcast on ALT TV. She also authored the book "Thai Literature Digest," which presents interesting aspects of Thai literature in an easily readable style.

== Awards ==
- Popular Vote, Thailand Best Blog Awards 2018
- Best Storytelling, Thailand Influencer Awards 2020
- Outstanding Creative Educational Media of the Year 2022
- Media Awards for Safe and Creative Content 2022
- Safe and Creative Media Plaque 2022
- Finalist, Best Influencer Performance on Social Media (Film & Literature), 10th Anniversary Thailand Zocial Awards
- Finalist, Best Creator Performance on Social Media (Knowledge & Education), 11th Thailand Social Awards

== Publications ==
Chananya has authored and published the following books:

=== Solo works ===
- Thai Literature Digest. 2017, ISBN 978-616-327-187-7. OCLC 1035763845.
- Thai Literature Digest. 2019, ISBN 978-616-327-218-8. Limited Edition: with cover design and illustrations by Chananya Techajaksemar. Publishing notes from Godaypoets:

=== In edited works ===
- Short story "Marisa Age (1)27", published in anthology: Phuwasetthaworn, Phitch, ed. (2021). "Marisa Age (1)27 – (one-hundred and) twenty-seven – years". มาริสา อายุ 27 ปี [Marisa Age 27 years] (in Thai). Contributions by eleven other authors, each contributing one short story. อะโวคาโด บุ๊กส์ [Avocado Books]. ISBN 978-616-93784-1-9. OCLC 1284850771.
