= Lilit Phra Lo =

Thai verse narrative (c. 1500)

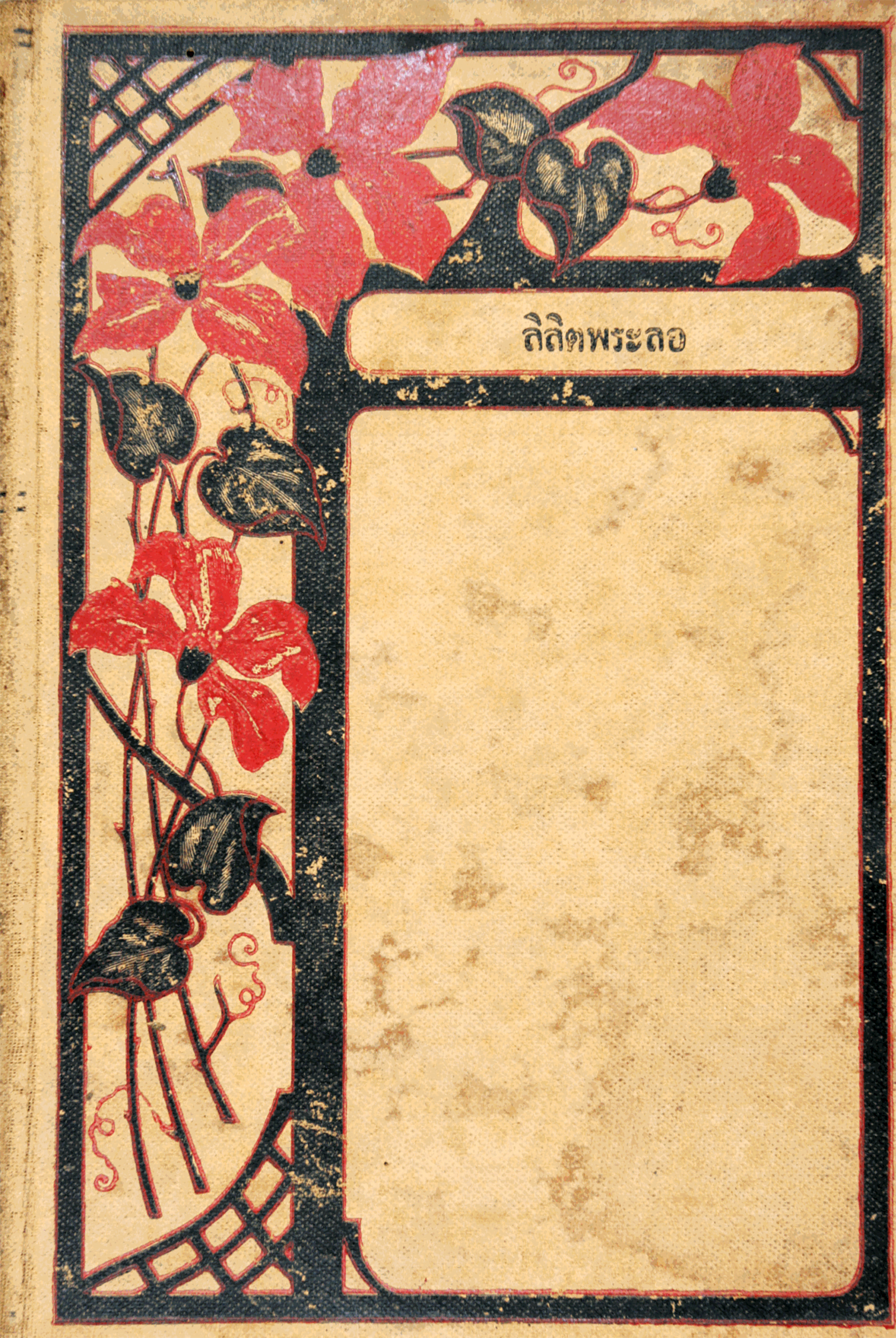
Cover of the first edition, 1915

Lilit Phra Lo (Thai: ลิลิตพระลอ) is a narrative poem of around 3,870 lines in Thai. Lilit is a poetic form; Phra is a prefix used for royalty and monks; Lo is the personal name of the hero, sometimes transcribed as Lor or Law. Date and authorship are unknown but the work was probably composed in the late fifteenth or early sixteenth century CE and counts among the five earliest works of Thai literature. The plot is a courtly romance that ends with a tragic massacre and political reconciliation. The work has been criticized for portraying feudal indulgence. The story has been repeatedly reworked by prominent novelists and film-makers, often adapting the plot to conform to modern values.

== Texts, editions and commentaries ==
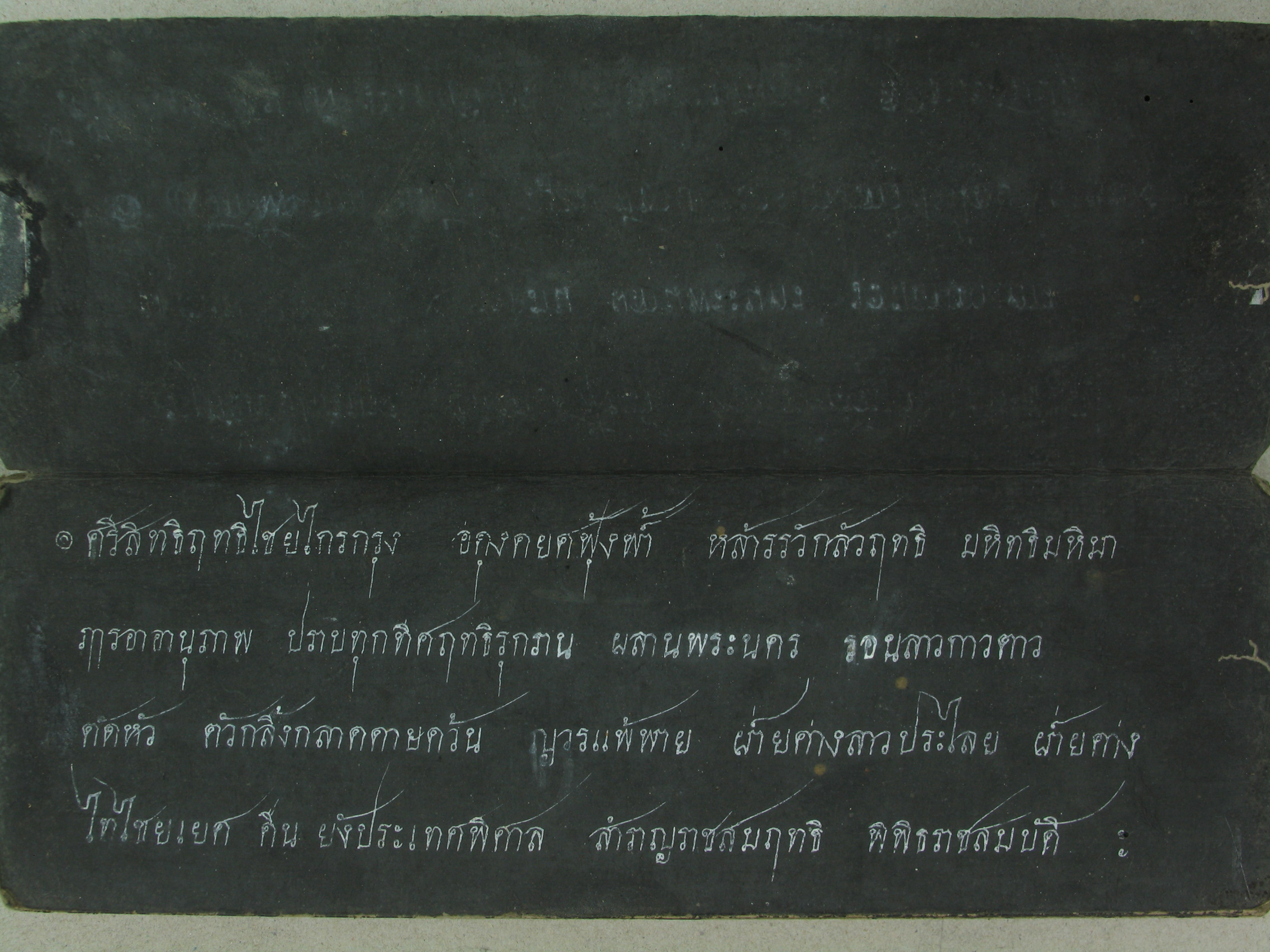
Opening folio from a samut khoi manuscript of Lilit Phra Lo (Chiang Mai University Library)

The National Library of Thailand holds fifty-two volumes of Lilit Phra Lo in the form of samut thai or samut khoi accordion books, including two complete sets. One volume carries a date of 1860. All are in the orthography of the middle to late nineteenth century. All of these manuscripts appear to come from a single source as there are no major variations in the story.

A first, undated printing was made at the behest of King Chulalongkorn, possibly in 1902. The Vajirañāṇa Library reprinted the same text in 1915 and 1926, and the National Library has reprinted the same text repeatedly with only minor corrections. This has become the standard text. However, there is no explanation of the relationship between this printed text and the various manuscript versions. Some stanzas in this printed text cannot now be located in any manuscript versions, and some stanzas found in most of the manuscripts are missing from the printed text.

In 1954, Chanthit Krasaesin (ฉันทิชย์ กระแสสินธุ์) edited an annotated version showing variations found in the various manuscripts.

In 1957, the Ministry of Education reprinted the National Library 1926 text, adding numbering of the stanzas and some glosses.

In 1961 Phra Worawetphisit (พระวรเวทย์พิสิฐ) (Seng Siwasi-anon), a monk and professor of Thai language and literature at Chulalongkorn University, who had edited the edition, authored Khu mue lilit phra lo (Handbook to Lilit Phra Lo).

In 2001, Cholada Ruengruglikit (ชลดา เรืองรักษ์ลิขิต) published an annotated edition based on the National Library text.

In 1916, the Wannakhadi Samoson (Literary Society), a body established by King Vajiravudh to promote literature, selected Lilit Phra Lo as a superb example of the lilit form. Since 1934, the poem has been used for teaching in secondary schools in Thailand.

== Plot ==
Song and Suang are two cities with royal rulers. When Suang attacks Song, the king of Song is killed, but the city is defended. The son who succeeds has two daughters, Phuean and Phaeng. When the king of Suang dies, he is succeeded by his son, Phra Lo, a man of "incomparable beauty."

Princesses Phuean and Phaeng hear of Lo's beauty and fall in love. Their maids Ruen and Roi arrange to have traders sing of the princesses' beauty so that Lo hears and falls in love with them in return.

The maids search for love magic to draw Lo to Song. All adepts refuse, saying their skills will not work on a king. The maids are taken to see Pu Chao Saming Phrai (Who is depicted as a weretiger-like rishi) deep in the mountains. He casts a spell which makes Lo desperate to travel to Song and make love to the princesses. Lo’s mother hires all the local adepts who successfully counter the spell. The maids send word to Pu Chao Saming Phrai who reinforces the spell, but Lo’s mother finds an adept who again can counter it. After the maids send word again, Pu Chao Saming Phrai recruits a massive spirit army which overwhelms the guardian spirits of Song and the magic of the city’s adepts. Pu Chao Saming Phrai then sends a flying betel nut which makes Lo unstoppable. His mother pleads with him in vain then gives him her blessing.

Lo leaves with a great army. Along the way he is torn between thoughts of his queen, consorts, and mother left behind, and his obsession with the princesses ahead. At the frontier, he sends the army home except for a hundred troops and two manservants, Khwan and Kaeo. They get past the border guards by bribery and subterfuge. At the Kalong River, he is again torn between going onwards or back home. When he looks for an omen in the river, the prediction is that he will not survive to return home, yet he decides to travel on. He leaves the remainder of the army behind, and sends ahead the two manservants who find the royal park of Song.

Impatient at the delay, the princesses send word to Pu Chao Saming Phrai, who arranges for a beautiful cock to lure Phra Lo. He meets up with his manservants and they enter the royal park. After, the two princesses and their two maids all dream the same dream. The maids travel to the royal park. The two sets of servants meet, pair off, and make love in a lake, on its bank, and in a pavilion. They reluctantly part to fetch their respective master and mistresses. Lo and the two princesses meet in a pavilion in the park. The four servants withdraw. The three make love. Outside, the four servants restrain themselves for fear of giving offence to a royal residence. The three bathe, eat a meal, and swear undying love. The princesses and their maids leave to return to Song before evening falls.

Lo and his manservants follow and enter the palace under cover of night. After they have stayed secretly with the princesses for half a month, word leaks out. The father of the princesses is angry, but once he sneaks a look at Lo, he realizes Lo will be a perfect son-in-law, and starts arrangements for the marriage. The late king's widow sees an opportunity to take revenge for the killing of her husband in the war between Suang and Song. Though the king ignores her pleas for vengeance, she secretly sends a murder squad. In the ensuing battle, the princesses come to stand beside Lo, and all three are killed by poison arrows. The four servants are also killed.

The King of Song is devastated. He has all members of the murder squad killed, and has the widow first flayed, then dragged to her death. The mother of the princesses is distraught to the point of madness. Arrangements are made to cremate the three royals and four servants in royal style. An envoy is sent to inform Suang. After pondering revenge, the mother of Lo decides to send envoys and presents to the cremation as a gesture of reconciliation. After the cremation, the relics of the three royals and four servants are evenly divided. In both Song and Suang, memorial stupas are erected and the relics are simultaneously interred, followed by a festival and merit-making.

== Characters ==
Principal characters in Lilit Phra Lo
Name	Description	Thai
Suang
Maen Suang	king of Suang	แมนสรวง
Queen Bunluea	his wife, the mother of Phra Lo	บุญเหลือ
Phra Lo	their son	พระลอ
Laksanawadi	wife of Phra Lo	ลักษณวดี
Khwan	servant/page of Lo	ขวัญ
Kaeo	servant/page of Lo	แก้ว
Song
Phimphisakhon	king of Song	พิมพิสาคร
Phichai Phitsanukon	son and successor of Phimphisakhon	พิไชพิษณุกร
Darawadi	wife of Phichai Phitsanukon	ดาราวดี
Phuean	daughter of Phichai Phitsanukon and Darawadi	เพื่อน
Phaeng	daughter of Phichai Phitsanukon and Darawadi	แพง
Ruen	maid to Phuean and Phaeng	รื่น
Roi	maid to Phuean and Phaeng	โรย
Other
Pu Chao Saming Phrai	an adept	ปู่เจ้าสมิงพราย
Pu Mo Thao	adept who helps find Pu Chao Saming Phrai	ปู่หมอเฒ่า
Sitthichai	adept helping Bunluea	สิทธิไชย

== Dating ==
Estimates for the dating of the work have ranged from pre-Ayutthaya era to the early Bangkok era. The language and the meter suggest a date in the late fifteenth or early sixteenth century. The language is similar to two other early literary works, Yuan Phai and Mahachat Khamluang (มหาชาติคำหลวง), and includes words and constructions that had disappeared by the seventeenth century.

Early Thai had three tones, identified by one of two tone markers or their absence. Lilit Phra Lo is written in metrical forms designed for this tonal structure. At some time before the mid-seventeenth century, pronunciation shifted to five tones. The old metrical forms fell out of use and were replaced by forms suitable to the five-tone structure. Lilit Phra Lo was clearly composed before this "great tone shift" in the Tai family of languages. Dating this shift has proved difficult.

Duangmon Jitjamnong argues that the battle between Ayutthaya and Lan Na mentioned in the preamble took place in the reign of King Trailokanat (1448–88) and hence dates the poem to that time.

MR Sumonnachat Sawatdikun argues that the mention of sanphet alludes to the Phra Si Sanphet Buddha image cast around 1500 and hence dates the poem to that time.

== Authorship ==
The authorship is also unclear. The last two stanzas both begin "Here ends the work of a king", and various attempts have made to identify what king is meant. However, since these verses were probably added to the poem later, and since the words for "king" differ across the manuscripts and printed editions, this pursuit has been inconclusive. As with many Thai literary works, Lilit Phra Lo may have developed over a long period with several authors contributing. The surviving text may have been owned by a performer who would have expanded its content during performance.

== Origins ==
In 1932, Prince Damrong Rajanubhab wrote that the Phra Lo story was "a folktale (nithan, นิทาน) from the Lan Na kingdom that seems to have been written down by a king before he ascended the throne." MR Sumonnachat Sawatdikun and Chanthit Krasaesin argue that the poem derives from the old Thai-Lao epic, Thao hung rue jueang, in which there is a character called Lo and a place called Kalong, the name of a river in Lilit Phra Lo. Lo is also the name of a son of the Thai-Lao founder-god Khun Borom/Bulom in several texts, including the chronicle of Lan Xang. Phaithun Phromwijit argues that the poem derives from a Shan folktale, Jao Sam Lo. However, none of these works has any trace of the distinctive plot of Lilit Phra Lo.

== Location ==
The two rival cities in Lilit Phra Lo are named Song and Suang. In 1945, MR Sumonnachat Sawatdikun proposed that Amphoe Song in Phrae Province is the town in the poem. Since 1951, the local authorities in Song have identified the town with the poem by renaming an old stupa as Phrathat Phra Lo (holy reliquary of Phra Lo), building shrines to other characters, opening a "Lilit Phra Lo Park" in 2008, and promoting the town to tourists as the "love land of Phra Lo." In 1990, Wat Luang in the provincial capital of Phrae built a Khum Phra Lo (Phra Lo's house) on the occasion of a visit by Princess Mahachakri Sirindhorn.

MR Sumonnachat Sawatdikun suggested that the Kalong River is at the village called Kalong to the northwest of Phayao. Nearby there are remains of an old moated mound which some scholars have identified with the city of Suang in the poem. Other sites for Suang have been proposed in Chiang Rai, Lampang, and Roi Et provinces.

Sujit Wongthes, an independent historian, rejects the identification of locations in the story with real locations. He argued that the word "Song" is an old Lao word meaning "prosperity" (this word originated from the word chalong), without any connection to the names of the characters in the story. Moreover, the story in Lilit Phra Lo is not found in the Lan Na chronicles or any of the Singhanavati chronicles. He therefore believes that the story of Lilit Phra Lo is only the imagination of the author.

== Meter ==
Lilit is a poetic form which includes verses in the meters known as khlong and rai.

Rai is a sequence of lines of five (and occasionally more) syllables with a rhyme from the final syllable of the line to the first-to-third syllable in the following line. The sequence may be of any length, and the end is often marked by a four-syllable line.

Khlong has variants of two, three, and four lines. The four-line version has four lines each of five syllables with a two- to four-syllable tailpiece, and usually a rhyme from the end syllable of the first line to a mid syllable in the second and third lines, and another from the end syllable of the second line to a mid syllable in the fourth line. Several variants dictate a pattern of tones on certain syllables. The two- and three-line versions are similar. The choice of form for each passage has no obvious guiding principle, except that rai is often used for narrative and khlong for dialogue, but this not a strict division.

Jindamani, a seventeenth-century manual or prosody, cites stanza 30 of Lilit Phra Lo as an example of khlong si. A formal equivalent paraphrase exemplifies its syllabification and rhyme scheme.

เสียงฦๅเสียงเล่าอ้าง	อันใด พี่เอย	So many rumors	abound, explain:
เสียงย่อมยอยศใคร	ทั่วหล้า	Who's so lauded 'round	each land?
สองเขือพี่หลับใหล	ลืมตื่น ฤๅพี่	Was your sleep so sound	you failed to wake?
สองพี่คิดเองอ้า	อย่าได้ถามเผือ	You should understand	so don't ask us.

Stanza 30

== Controversies ==
Some literary scholars have argued that the author or authors of Lilit Phra Lo made mistakes in the placement or rhymes and tones; either the authors were unskilled or the metrical forms had not yet developed to the refined suphap (สุภาพ) forms achieved in the seventeenth century.

MR Sumonnachat Sawatdikun pointed out that the authors were being judged by metrical rules that may have been formulated long after the poem was composed. Robert Bickner added that the use of the meter in the poem is consistent and conforms to the nature of the Thai language at the time, and that most of the anomalies can be attributed to corruptions of the manuscript by copyists and editors.

In 1949, the poet Atsani Pholajan wrote an article under the pen-name Indrayuth (อินทรายุธ) in the magazine Aksonsan criticizing Lilit Phra Lo as "feudal literature" produced by and for a degenerate elite, and calling on people to read literature with social relevance instead. Several scholars including Suphon Bunnag (ศุภร บุนนาค) and Wibha Kongkananda (วิภา กงกะนันทน์) defended the poem on grounds of its literary value and exposition of the Buddhist theory of karma.

== Adaptations ==
The poem was adapted as a drama by the Front Palace King, Mahasak Phonlasep in the Bangkok Third Reign, and again by Chaophraya Thewet Wongwiwat (MR Lan Kunchon) in the Fifth Reign.

In the late nineteenth century, the poem or certain passages were adapted as stage dramas and dance dramas, notably by Prince Narathip and his wife Tuan.

In 1933, Chote Praepan under the pen-name Yakhob (ยาขอบ) wrote a short story "Phuean–Phaeng" which transferred the characters of Lilit Phra Lo into a modern rural setting. Lo, a farmer, has an affair with the sister of his lover, and after she dies in childbirth, Lo commits suicide. In 1970, Cherd Songsri adapted the story into a film with Sorapong Chatree as lead actor.

In 1968 Thangai Suwannathat directed a film "Phra Lo" in which Phra Lo is portrayed as a great king, the romance is downplayed, and the love scenes are omitted. In the finale, troops from Suang attack Song and burn it to the ground.

In 1969, Nittaya Natayasunthon (นิตยา นาฏยสุนทร) authored a novel, Rak thi thuk muean (Love abandoned), in which Laksanawadi is the upright heroine, the two princesses are portrayed in a bad light, and Phra Lo is lured by the widowed grandmother in order to kill him in revenge.

In 1970, the prolific popular novelist Thommayanti (Wimon Jiamjaroen) authored a novel Rak thi ton mon (Love by magic), which retains the original plot except for making the grandmother rather than the princesses responsible for luring Phra Lo to Song, and omitting the love scenes. The novel was adapted into stage dramas by Nalini Sitasuwan (1977) and Patravadi Sitrairat (Lo dilokrat, 1986).

== Illustrations ==
The illustrator Hem Vejakorn (1904–69) illustrated a full set of scenes from the poem.

The national artist Chakrabhand Posyakrit painted several scenes, especially of the two princesses.

== Translations ==
Cover of Pei-Xiong translation

In 1937, Prem Chaya (Prince Prem Purachatra) authored what he called "a rather freely adapted version" of the poem broadcast as a play by the BBC. In 1981, Suraphon Wirunlak adapted the script for a stage performance in Malaysia.

In 1999, a translation by Pairote Gesmankit, Rajda Isarasena, and Sudchit Bhinyoying was published as part of a project to publish ASEAN literature in translation.

In 1960, Ousa Sheanakul Ways and Walter Robinson made a translation that was never published.

In 2013, Pei Xiaorui (Chinese: 裴晓睿) and Xiong Ran (Chinese: 熊燃) published a Chinese translation in classical meter along with essays on the poem as (Chinese: 《<帕罗赋>翻译与研究》，北京：北京大学出版社).

In 2020, Robert J. Bickner published an English translation.

== Studies in Western languages ==
Robert J. Bickner completed a thesis at University of Michigan with a detailed examination of the metrical forms used. The study was published in 1991.

Soison Sakolrak completed a thesis at SOAS, University of London in 2003, concentrating on the modern adaptations of the poem.

In 1982, Wibha Kongkananda authored Phra Lo: A Portrait of the Hero as Tragic Lover for UNESCO.

In 2000, Giles Delouche wrote an appreciation of the poem in French.
