= Gilles Delouche =

French university professor (1948–2020)

- Born: 3 August 1948; Orléans, France
- Died: 20 January 2020 (aged 71)

Gilles Delouche (3 August 1948 – 20 January 2020) was a French scholar of classical literature of the Rattanakosin Kingdom (Thai language). Delouche, who was born in Orléans, was Professor at the Institut national des langues et civilisations orientales (INALCO) since 1987, having taught from 1971 to 1987 at the Faculty of Arts, Silpakorn University (Thailand), which awarded him an honorary degree.

Gilles Delouche served as president of the Institut national des langues et civilisations orientales from 2001 to 2005. His teaching focused on introductory Thai syntax, but also more particularly on Siamese versification and classical works, from their origins to the seventeenth century.

He was the author of some fifty articles published in French, English and Thai, concerning issues of the dating and restoration of classical Siamese manuscripts, as well as work on the origins of the first embodiment of Siamese unity in the first part of the Ayudhya period (1350–1656).

== Selected bibliography ==
- Le garçon en jaune safran (short story), by Sridaoruang, translated by Gilles Delouche, Jentayu, 2015 ISBN 978-2-9549892-1-1
- La vieille (short story), by Angkarn Kalayanapong, translated by Gilles Delouche, Jentayu, 2016 ISBN 978-2-9549892-5-9
- Pong (short story), by Korn Kraylat, translated by Gilles Delouche, Jentayu, 2016 ISBN 978-2-9549892-7-3
- Méthode de thaï, Gilles Delouche, L'Asiathèque, 1997, 248 pages (series Langues & Mondes), first edition: 1988 ISBN 2-901795-83-8
- Le Nirat, poème de séparation, Gilles Delouche, Peteers, Louvain, 2003, 218 pages (series: Bibliothèque de l'INALCO) ISBN 2-87723-735-4 (Paris) ISBN 90-429-1338-X (Louvain)
- Étude d'un genre classique siamois une analyse d'un genre littéraire spécifique au Siam, le « nirat ».
