= Royal Ceremonies of the Twelve Months =

The Royal Ceremonies of the Twelve Months (Thai: พระราชพิธีสิบสองเดือน, RTGS: phraratchaphithi sip song duean, also known by Pali/Sanskrit loanwords as phraratchaphithi thawathotsamat, พระราชพิธีทวาทศมาส) is a historical description of the annual royal ceremonies undertaken throughout the year by the monarchy of Siam (now Thailand). They are described in the Palace Law of the Ayutthaya Kingdom (14th–18th centuries), and mentioned in the 15th-century Thawathotsamat epic poem.

The ceremonies received renewed interest from the monarchy and aristocracy during the middle Rattanakosin period. During the reign of King Mongkut (Rama IV, 1851–1868), Prince Mahamala wrote an epic poem about the ceremonies, titled Khlong Phraratchaphithi Thawathotsamat (โคลงพระราชพิธีทวาทศมาส), which was first published in book form in 1920. Mongkut's successor King Chulalongkorn (Rama V, r. 1868–1910) wrote and published, in prose, a treatise on the ceremonies titled Phraratchaphithi Sip Song Duean in 1888. The kings, as well as Chulalongkorn's successor King Vajiravudh (Rama VI, 1910–1925) modified and updated many of the ceremonies.

The practices ceased following the abolition of absolute monarchy in 1932, but some ceremonies were revived during the reign of King Bhumibol Adulyadej, especially with the re-popularisation of the monarchy during the 1960s–1970s. The Royal Ploughing Ceremony is one of the few royal ceremonies that are still held annually today.

One of the obsolete ceremonies among the Ceremonies of the Twelve Months was the Triyampawai swing ceremony.
