= Thai poetry =

Poetry in Thai literature

Poetry has been featured extensively in Thai literature, and constituted the near-exclusive majority of literary works up to the early Rattanakosin period (early 19th century). Most of imaginative literary works in Thai, before the 19th century, were composed in poetry. Consequently, although many literary works were lost with the sack of Ayutthaya in 1767, Thailand still has a great number of epic poems or long poetic tales -- some with original stories and some with stories drawn from foreign sources. The Siamese poetical medium consists of five main forms, known as khlong, chan, kap, klon and rai; some of these developed indigenously while others were borrowed from other languages. Thai poetry dates to the Sukhothai period (13th–14th centuries) and flourished under Ayutthaya (14th–18th centuries), during which it developed into its current forms. Though many works were lost to the Burmese conquest of Ayutthaya in 1767, sponsorship by subsequent kings helped revive the art, with new works created by many great poets, including Sunthorn Phu (1786–1855). Prose writing as a literary form was introduced as a Western import during the reign of King Mongkut (1851–68) and gradually gained popularity, though poetry saw a revival during the reign of King Vajiravudh (1910–25), who authored and sponsored both traditional poetry and the newer literary forms. Poetry's popularity as a mainstream form of literature gradually declined afterwards, although it is still written and read, and is regularly employed ceremonially.

== Forms ==
Thai poetic works follow established prosodic forms, known as chanthalak (Thai: ฉันทลักษณ์, pronounced [tɕʰǎntʰalák]). Almost all have rules governing the exact metre and rhyme structure, i.e. the number of syllables in each line and which syllable rhymes with which. Certain forms also specify the tone or tone marks of syllables; others have requirements of syllable "heaviness". Alliteration and within-line rhyming are also often employed, but are not required by the rules.

=== Khlong ===
The khlong (โคลง, [kʰlōːŋ]) is among the oldest Thai poetic forms. This is reflected in its requirements on the tone markings of certain syllables, which must be marked with mai ek (ไม้เอก, [máj èːk], ◌่) or mai tho (ไม้โท, [máj tʰōː], ◌้). This was likely derived from when the Thai language had three tones (as opposed to today's five, a split which occurred during the Ayutthaya period), two of which corresponded directly to the aforementioned marks. It is usually regarded as an advanced and sophisticated poetic form.

In khlong, a stanza (bot, บท, [bòt]) has a number of lines (bat, บาท, [bàːt], from Pali and Sanskrit pāda), depending on the type. The bat are subdivided into two wak (วรรค, [wák], from Sanskrit varga). (Note: In literary studies, line in western poetry is translated as bat. However, in some forms, the unit is more equivalent to wak. To avoid confusion, this article will refer to wak and bat instead of line, which may refer to either.) The first wak has five syllables, the second has a variable number, also depending on the type, and may be optional. The type of khlong is named by the number of bat in a stanza; it may also be divided into two main types: khlong suphap (โคลงสุภาพ, [kʰlōːŋ sù.pʰâːp]) and khlong dan (โคลงดั้น, [kʰlōːŋ dân]). The two differ in the number of syllables in the second wak of the final bat and inter-stanza rhyming rules.

==== Khlong si suphap ====
The khlong si suphap (โคลงสี่สุภาพ, [kʰlōːŋ sìː sù.pʰâːp]) is the most common form still currently employed. It has four bat per stanza (si translates as four). The first wak of each bat has five syllables. The second wak has two or four syllables in the first and third bat, two syllables in the second, and four syllables in the fourth. Mai ek is required for seven syllables and Mai tho is required for four, as shown below. "Dead word" syllables are allowed in place of syllables which require mai ek, and changing the spelling of words to satisfy the criteria is usually acceptable.

The following plan shows the rhyming structure of one stanza. Each letter represents a syllable; A and B (also C, D, E and F in other examples) represent rhyming syllables. Syllables shown by letters in parentheses are optional.

OOOOO	OA (OO)
OOOOA	OB
OOOOA	OO (OO)
OOOOB	OOOO

The following plan shows the tone mark requirements; each ◌ represents one syllable.

◌◌◌◌่◌้	◌◌ (◌◌)
◌◌่◌◌◌	◌่◌้
◌◌◌่◌◌	◌◌่ (◌◌)
◌◌่◌◌◌้	◌่◌้◌◌

===== Example =====
Stanza from Lilit Phra Lo, read with regular intonation

Stanza from Lilit Phra Lo, read in thamnong sano

เสียงฦๅเสียงเล่าอ้าง	อันใด พี่เอย
เสียงย่อมยอยศใคร	ทั่วหล้า
สองเขือพี่หลับใหล	ลืมตื่น ฤๅพี่
สองพี่คิดเองอ้า	อย่าได้ถามเผือ

— Unknown, Lilit Phra Lo (ลิลิตพระลอ), c 15th–16th centuries

Transcriptions:

Royal Thai General System of Transcription (RTGS):
siang lue siang lao ang	an dai phi oei
siang yom yo yot khrai	thua la
song khuea phi lap lai	luem tuen rue phi
song phi khit eng a	ya dai tham phuea

International Phonetic Alphabet (IPA):
sǐaŋ lɯ̄ː sǐaŋ lâw ʔâːŋ	ʔān dāj pʰîː ʔɤ̄ːj
sǐaŋ jɔ̂m jɔ̄ː jót kʰrāj	tʰûa lâː
sɔ̌ːŋ kʰɯ̌a pʰîː làp lǎj	lɯ̄ːm tɯ̀ːn rɯ̄ː pʰîː
sɔ̌ːŋ pʰîː kʰít ʔēːŋ ʔâː	jàː dâːj tʰǎːm pʰɯ̌a

Translation:

What tales, what rumours, you ask?
Of whom is this praise being spread throughout the world?
Have you two been asleep, having forgotten to wake up?
You both can think of it yourselves; do not ask me.

=== Chan ===
The chan (ฉันท์, [tɕʰǎn] from Pali chando), is derived from Pali and Sanskrit metres, and based on the Vuttodaya, a Sri Lankan treatise on Pali prosody. It developed during the Ayutthaya period, and became a prominent poetic form, but declined afterwards until it resurfaced in a 1913 revival.

The main feature of the chan is its requirements on the "heaviness" of each syllable. Syllables are classified as either "light" (lahu, ลหุ, [lahù]), those with a short vowel and open ending, or "heavy" (kharu, ครุ, [kʰarú]; See also Light and heavy syllables under Sanskrit prosody). The Thai metres follow their Pali/Sanskrit origins, with added rhyming schemes. Modern authors have also invented new forms for their compositions. Two traditional forms are shown here.

==== Inthrawichian chan ====
The inthrawichian chan (อินทรวิเชียรฉันท์, [īn.tʰrá.wí.tɕʰīːan tɕʰǎn], from Indravajra, a form of Sanskrit poetry and meaning Indra's thunderbolt) has two bat per stanza, with eleven syllables in each bat, following the pattern HHLHH LLHLHH (H represents heavy and L represents light syllables):

HHLHH	LLHLHH
HHLHH	LLHLHH

The rhyming scheme (which is identical to that of kap yani, see below) is shown here in two stanzas:

OOOOA	OOAOOB
OOOOB	OOOOOC
OOOOD	OODOOC
OOOOC	OOOOOO

===== Example =====
Two stanzas from Na Hat Sai Chai Thale Haeng Nueng, read with regular intonation

Two stanzas from Na Hat Sai Chai Thale Haeng Nueng, read in thamnong sano

สายัณห์ตะวันยาม	ขณะข้ามทิฆัมพร
เข้าภาคนภาตอน	ทิศะตกก็รำไร
รอนรอนและอ่อนแสง	นภะแดงสิแปลงไป
เป็นครามอร่ามใส	สุภะสดพิสุทธิ์สี

— Chit Burathat (1892–1942), Na Hat Sai Chai Thale Haeng Nueng (ณ หาดทรายชายทะเลแห่งหนึ่ง, "At a Seaside Beach")

Transcription:

RTGS:
sayan tawan yam	khana kham thikhamphon
khao phak napha ton	thisa tok ko ramrai
ron ron lae on saeng	napha daeng si plaeng pai
pen khram aram sai	supha sot phisut si

IPA:
sǎː.jān ta.wān jāːm	kʰa.nàʔ kʰâːm tʰí.kʰām.pʰɔ̄n
kʰâw pʰâːk ná.pʰāː tɔ̄ːn	tʰí.sàʔ tòk kɔ̂ rām.rāj
rɔ̄ːn rɔ̄ːn lɛ́ʔ ʔɔ̀ːn sɛ̌ːŋ	ná.pʰáʔ dɛ̄ːŋ sìʔ plɛ̄ːŋ pāj
pēn kʰrāːm ʔa.ràːm sǎj	sù.pʰáʔ sòt pʰí.sùt sǐː

Translation:

The evening settles as the sun crosses the sky.
As it sets in the west, its light fades.
Its last rays flicker, and the sky turns from red
Into a clear glowing indigo, so bright and pure.

==== Wasantadilok chan ====
The wasantadilok chan วสันตดิลกฉันท์, [wá.sǎn.tà.dì.lòk tɕʰǎn], from Sanskrit vasantatilaka) has fourteen syllables per bat, with the pattern HHLHLLLH LLHLHH:

HHLHLLLH	LLHLHH
HHLHLLLH	LLHLHH

The following plan shows the rhyme structure in two stanzas.

OOOOOOOA	OOAOOB
OOOOOOOB	OOOOOC
OOOOOOOD	OODOOC
OOOOOOOC	OOOOOO

===== Example =====
Stanza from Inlarat Kham Chan

ช่อฟ้าก็เฟื้อยกลจะฟัด	ดลฟากทิฆัมพร
บราลีพิไลพิศบวร	นภศูลสล้างลอย

— Phraya Sisunthonwohan (Phan Salak), Inlarat Kham Chan (อิลราชคำฉันท์), c 1913

Transcription:

RTGS:
chofa ko fueai kala cha fat	dala fak thikhamphon
brali philai phisa bawon	napha sun salang loi

IPA:
tɕʰɔ̂ː.fáː kɔ̂ fɯ́aj ka.lá tɕa fát	da.la fâːk tʰí.kʰām.pʰɔ̄ːn
brāː.līː pʰí.lāj pʰí.sa ba.wɔ̄ːn	ná.pʰá sǔːn sa.lâːŋ lɔ̄ːj

Translation:

The chofa stretches out as if it would fight the very sky.
The roof crest-plates are such a grand beauty to look at; the spire of the stupa soars up high.

=== Kap ===
There are several forms of kap (กาพย์, [kàːp]), each with its specific metre and rhyming rules. The kap may have originated either from the Indic metres or from Cambodian forms.

==== Kap yani ====
The kap yani (กาพย์ยานี, [kàːp jāː.nīː], or yani sip et, sip et meaning eleven, referring to the number of syllables per bat) has two bat per stanza. Each has two wak, with five and six syllables. It is slow in rhythm, and usually used to describe beauty and nature. The following plan shows the rhyming scheme in two stanzas; the spaces show the usual rhythmic breaks (not shown in writing).

OO OOA	OOA OOB
OO OOB	OOO OOC
OO OOD	OOD OOC
OO OOC	OOO OOO

===== Example =====
Two stanzas from Kap He Ruea, read with regular intonation

Two stanzas from Kap He Ruea, read in thamnong sano

เรือสิงห์วิ่งเผ่นโผน	โจนตามคลื่นฝืนฝ่าฟอง
ดูยิ่งสิงห์ลำพอง	เป็นแถวท่องล่องตามกัน
นาคาหน้าดั่งเป็น	ดูเขม้นเห็นขบขัน
มังกรถอนพายพัน	ทันแข่งหน้าวาสุกรี

— Chaofa Thammathibet (1705–46), Kap He Ruea (กาพย์เห่เรือ พระนิพนธ์เจ้าฟ้าธรรมธิเบศร, Kap for the Royal Barge Procession)

Transcription:

RTGS:
ruea sing wing phen phon	chon tam khluen fuen fa fong
du ying sing lamphong	pen thaeo thong long tam kan
nakha na dang pen	du khamen hen khopkhan
mangkon thon phai phan	than khaeng na wasukri

IPA:
rɯ̄a sǐŋ wîŋ pʰèn pʰǒːn	tɕōn tāːm kʰlɯ̂ːn fɯ̌ːn fàː fōːŋ
dūː yîŋ sǐŋ lām.pʰɔ̄ːŋ	pēn tʰɛ̌w tʰôŋ lôŋ tāːm kān
nāː.kʰāː nâː dàŋ pēn	dūː kʰa.mên hěn kʰòp.kʰǎn
māŋ.kɔ̄ːn thɔ̌ːn pʰāːj pʰān	tʰān kʰɛ̀ŋ nâː wāː.sù.krīː

==== Kap chabang ====
The kap chabang (กาพย์ฉบัง, [kàːp tɕʰa.bāŋ], or chabang sip hok, sip hok meaning sixteen, the number of syllables per stanza) has three wak per stanza, with six syllables in the first and third, and four syllables in the second. It is often used for narratives, and often accompanies the chan. The following plan shows two stanzas.

OOOOOA	OOOA
OOOOOB
OOOOOB	OOOB
OOOOOO

===== Example =====
Two stanzas from Veneration of the Dhamma, read with regular intonation

Two stanzas from Veneration of the Dhamma, read in thamnong sano

ธรรมะคือคุณากร	ส่วนชอบสาธร
ดุจดวงประทีปชัชวาล
แห่งองค์พระศาสดาจารย์	ส่องสัตว์สันดาน
สว่างกระจ่างใจมนท์

— Phraya Sisunthonwohan (Noi Acharayangkun) (1822–91), Veneration of the Dhamma (บทนมัสการพระธรรมคุณ)

Transcription:

RTGS:
thamma khue khunakon	suan chop sathon
dut duang prathip chatchawan
haeng ong phra satsadachan	song sat sandan
sawang krachang chai mon

IPA:
tʰām.máʔ kʰɯ̄ː kʰú.nāː.kɔ̄ːn	sùan tɕʰɔ̂ːp sǎː.tʰɔ̄ːn
dùt dūaŋ pra.tʰîːp tɕʰát.tɕʰa.wāːn
hɛ̀ŋ ʔōŋ pʰráʔ sàːt.sa.dāː.tɕāːn	sɔ̀ŋ sàt sǎndāːn
sawàːŋ kra.tɕàːŋ tɕāi mōn

Translation:

The Dhamma is the foundation of good, that which itself is good.
Like a bright lantern,
Of the great prophet-teacher, shining into each being's character,
Bringing light to foolish hearts.

==== Kap surangkhanang ====
The kap surangkhanang yi sip paet (กาพย์สุรางคนางค์ 28, [kàːp sù.rāːŋ.kʰa.nāːŋ jîː sìp pɛ̀t], yi sip paet means twenty-eight) has seven wak per stanza, with four syllables in each wak. A less common form is surangkhanang sam sip song (thirty-two), with eight wak per stanza. Its rhythm is fast, and is used to describe anger and fighting. The following plan shows two stanzas of surangkhanang 28.

OOOA	OOOA	OOOB
OOOC	OCOB	OOOB	OOOD
OOOE	OOOE	OOOD
OOOF	OFOD	OOOD	OOOO

=== Klon ===
In the generic sense, klon (กลอน, [klɔ̄ːn]) originally referred to any type of poetry. In the narrow sense it refers to a more recently developed form where a stanza has four wak, each with the same number of syllables. It is usually considered an original Thai form. The klon metres are named by the number of syllables in a wak, e.g. klon hok (กลอนหก, [klɔ̄ːn hòk]) has six syllables per wak (hok means six). All metres have the same rhyming scheme, and there are also requirements on the tone of the final syllable of each wak. The klon is also divided into several types according to their manner of composition, with klon suphap (กลอนสุภาพ, [klɔ̄ːn sù.pʰâːp]) being the basic form.

The following plan shows the structure of klon suphap (two stanzas) in the most common eight-syllable variety, which was employed extensively by Sunthorn Phu, and is the most common form of the Rattanakosin period. The letters in parentheses represent alternative rhyming syllables. In practice, occasional wak with seven or nine syllables are also acceptable.

OOO OO OOA	OOA O(A) OOB
OOO OO OOB	OOB O(B) OOC
OOO OO OOD	OOD O(D) OOC
OOO OO OOC	OOC O(C) OOO

==== Example ====
Three stanzas from Nirat Phukhao Thong, read with regular intonation

Three stanzas from Nirat Phukhao Thong, read in thamnong sano

ถึงโรงเหล้าเตากลั่นควันโขมง	มีคันโพงผูกสายไว้ปลายเสา
โอ้บาปกรรมน้ำนรกเจียวอกเรา	ให้มัวเมาเหมือนหนึ่งบ้าเป็นน่าอาย
ทำบุญบวชกรวดน้ำขอสำเร็จ	พระสรรเพชญโพธิญาณประมาณหมาย
ถึงสุราพารอดไม่วอดวาย	ไม่ใกล้กรายแกล้งเมินก็เกินไป
ไม่เมาเหล้าแล้วแต่เรายังเมารัก	สุดจะหักห้ามจิตคิดไฉน
ถึงเมาเหล้าเช้าสายก็หายไป	แต่เมาใจนี้ประจำทุกค่ำคืน

— Sunthorn Phu, Nirat Phukhao Thong (นิราศภูเขาทอง, c 1828)

Transcription:

RTGS:
thueng rong lao tao klan khwan khamong	mi khan phong phuk sai wai plai sao
o bap kam nam narok chiao ok rao	hai mua mao muean nueng ba pen na ai
tham bun buat kruat nam kho samret	phra sanphet phothiyan praman mai
thueng sura pha rot mai wotwai	mai klai krai klaeng moen ko koen pai
mai mao lao laeo tae rao yang mao rak	sut cha hak ham chit khit chanai
thueng mao lao chao sai ko hai pai	tae mao chai ni pracham thuk kham khuen

IPA:
tʰɯ̌ŋ rōːŋ lâw tāw klàn kʰwān kʰamǒːŋ	mīː kʰān pʰoːŋ pʰùːk saːj wáj plāːj sǎw
ʔôː bàːp kām náːm na.rók tɕīaw ʔòk rāw	hâj mūa māw mɯ̌an nɯ̀ŋ bâː pēn nâː ʔāːj
tʰām būn bùat krùat náːm kʰɔ̌ː sǎm.rèt	pʰrá sǎn.pʰét pʰōː.tʰí.jāːn pra.māːn mǎːj
tʰɯ̌ŋ sù.rāː pʰāː rɔ̂ːt mâj wɔ̂ːtwāːj	mâj klâj krāːj klɛ̂ːŋ mɤ̄ːn kɔ̂ kɤ̄ːn pāj
mâj māw lâw lɛ́ːw tɛ́ː rāw jāŋ māw rák	sùt tɕa hàk hâːm tɕìt kʰít tɕʰa.nǎj
tʰɯ̌ŋ māw lâw tɕʰáw sǎːj kɔ̂ hǎːj pāːj	tɛ̀ː māw tɕāj níː pra.tɕām tʰúk kʰâm kʰɯ̄ːn

=== Rai ===
The rai (ร่าย, [râːj]) is probably the oldest Thai poetic form and was used in laws and chronicles. It is also the simplest. It consists of a continuing series of wak of unspecified number, usually with five syllables each, and with rhymes from the last syllable of a wak to the first, second or third of the next. Some variations don't specify the number of syllables per wak and are actually a form of rhymed prose. A composition consisting of rai alternating with (and ending with) khlong is known as lilit (ลิลิต, [lí.lít]), and suggests that the khlong developed from the rai. The following is the form of rai known as rai boran (ร่ายโบราณ, [râːj bōː.rāːn]).

OOOA A(A)(A)OB B(B)(B)OC C(C)(C)OD D(D)(D)OE E(E)(E)OO ...

==== Example ====
สรวมสวัสดิวิชัย เกริกกรุงไกรเกรียงยศ เกียรติปรากฏขจรขจาย สบายทั่วแหล่งหล้า ฝนฟ้าฉ่ำชุ่มชล ไพศรพณ์ผลพูนเพิ่ม เหิมใจราษฎร์บำเทิง...ประเทศสยามชื่นช้อย ทุกข์ขุกเข็ญใหญ่น้อย นาศไร้แรงเกษม โสตเทอญ

— King Chulalongkorn, the Nitra Chakrit (ลิลิตนิทราชาคริต, 1879)

== Reading ==
When read aloud, Thai poetry may be read conventionally, or in a melodic fashion known as thamnong sano (ทำนองเสนาะ, [tʰām.nōːŋ sanɔ̀ʔ], lit. pleasing melody). Thamnong sano has many melodic styles, and there are also other specific styles used for certain performances, such as sepha. Thamnong sano reading is often featured in student competitions, along with other forms of language-related performances.

== See also ==
- Category:Thai-language poems
