= Supa Sirisingh =

Thai novelist (born 1945)

- สุภา สิริสิงห
- Born: Supa Luesiri (สุภา ลือศิริ); 13 August 1945 (age 81); Thonburi, Bangkok, Thailand
- Other name: Botan (โบตั๋น) (pen name)
- Education: Chulalongkorn University
- Occupation: Writer
- Notable work: Letters from Thailand
- Awards: SEATO literary award 1969; Thailand National Artist of the Year 1999

Supa Sirisingh (Thai: สุภา สิริสิงห) née Luesiri (Thai: ลือศิริ), (born 13 August 1945), is a Thai author who writes under the pseudonym Botan, which translates literally from Thai as 'peony'. Her first name frequently appears as Supha. She is married to Viriya Sirisingh, a well-known publisher. Supa Sirisingh is best known for her novel, Letters from Thailand (Chotmai Chak Muang Thai).

== Early life ==
The youngest daughter in her family, Sirisingh was born in the Phasi Charoen District of Thonburi, separated from Bangkok by the Chao Phraya River. Sirisingh's father was an immigrant from southern China, and her mother was of Chinese descent born in Thailand. She spent much of her childhood working at her parents orchard in Thonburi. Even though her father didn't believe in educating women, she managed to earn enough scholarships, the first of which she won when she was nine years old, to put herself through secondary and primary school, and then through college.

== Education ==
Sirisingh went to the Sutham Sueksa School for her primary and lower secondary schooling. She continued her upper secondary schooling at Watthana Sueksa School, and, finally, she graduated from high school and earned her diploma at the Triam Udom Sueksa School. She went on to earn her BA and MA degrees in 1966, from Chulalongkorn University in Bangkok, with a double major in English and Thai.

== Career ==
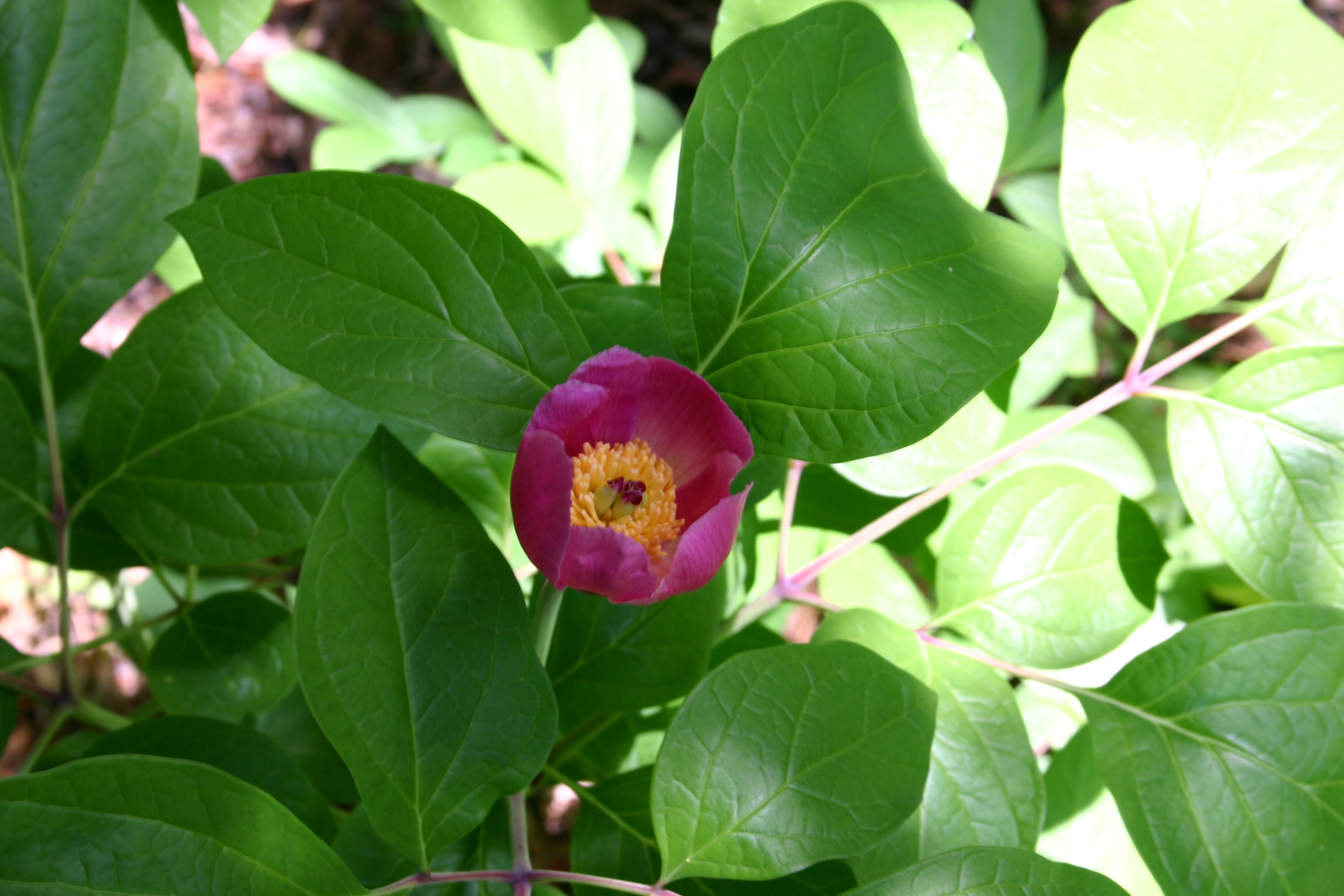
Woodland Peony

Sirisingh first worked as a teacher before becoming a magazine editor, and then a freelance writer. In 1965, she was working as a writer for a Thai women's magazine named Satrisan when she first started using the pen name "Botan", one of many she would use throughout her career. She still works as a freelance writer and has published more than sixty novels. Many of her books have been successfully adapted for television and film.

== Works ==
=== Letters from Thailand ===
Sirisingh's novel, Letters from Thailand (Chotmai Chak Muang Thai), was written when she was twenty-one. Susan Fulop Kepner translated the book into English thirteen years later, and it was published in Thailand. Her highly acclaimed novel, which depicts the conflict between Chinese-Thai cultures and the life of ethnic Thais, is one of the best-known English translations of a Thai literary work, and it has been translated into ten languages. The book was never formally published in the West.

At the time of its writing, Letters from Thailand was considered controversial because the author refused to leave out aspects of the prevalent culture, opinions, or family matters that others would have ignored. Many Chinese-Thais as well as some native Thais found reasons to be offended by the way their cultures were depicted in the novel.

The book consists of ninety-six letters, ranging from 1945 to 1967, written by a young man to his mother as he makes his way south from south China to emigrate to Thailand.

=== That Woman's Name is Boonrod ===
That Woman's Name is Boonrod (Phu Ying Khon Nan Chue Boonrod) was published in Thailand in 1980. Vichit Kounavudhi (1922–1997) directed an independent film based on That Woman's Name is Boonrod in 1985. The film was featured at the Bangkok International Film Festival in 2005.

=== Waewvan ===
Waewvan is briefly mentioned. The title does not translate to English, but like other books Sirisingh has written, it is about the plight of Thai women in the male-dominated Chinese culture.

== Awards ==
Sirisingh received the (SEATO) literary award for Letters from Thailand in 1969, the same year it was published. Some time later, the book would become required reading in high school in an effort to promote détente between the Thai and Chinese cultures. Thirty years later, in 1999, Sirisingh was named a Thailand National Artist of the Year.
