= Banana rib hobbyhorse riding =

Thai children's game

Banana rib hobbyhorse riding (Thai: ขี่ม้าก้านกล้วย, RTGS: khi ma kan kluai, pronounced [kʰìː máː kâːn klûa̯j]), is a Thai game for children. It incorporates a banana rib, as banana trees are found easily in Thai neighborhoods.

One banana rib is cut from the tree, about a meter long, and a banana leaf tip is carved off using a sharp knife. This becomes part of the horse's body. At the end of the rib, the banana leaf forms the horse's tail. Players then cut the rope to an appropriate size, then tie it at the head and the tail to make a belt to put on the shoulders.
