= Thai encyclopedia =

The creation of an encyclopedia in the Thai language began in 1943. it was undertaken by the Royal Institute, but the project was halted until 1954. Field Marshal Plaek Phibunsongkhram, the prime minister at the time and head of the Royal Institute, proposed that the institute launch a new project to compile a Thai encyclopedia. The proposal was submitted to the prime minister and the Cabinet, who approved the establishment of an editorial board for the encyclopedia. Chaired by Phraya Anuman Rajadhon as the first president, the project produced the work titled The Royal Institute Thai Encyclopedia Edition, considered the first encyclopedia in Thailand. The encyclopedia was initially compiled at a rate of two issues per month, each consisting of two pages, and later collected and published as a large volume. The first edition was published in 1955. As of today, the encyclopedia has been completed for all letters, taking 60 years from 1955 to 2015, and comprising a total of 30 volumes.

In 1963, Bhumibol Adulyadej graciously approved the establishment of the "Thai Youth Encyclopedia Project Foundation, under the Royal Initiative of Bhumibol Adulyadej"—originally named the ‘Thai Youth Encyclopedia Project under the Royal Initiative of His Majesty the King’ at that time. The foundation aimed to compile a Thai encyclopedia by gathering knowledge from all fields of study, so that students, university students, and the general public could have the opportunity to read and learn from it. The first volume of the encyclopedia was published in 1973. As of today, a total of 45 volumes have been published. In addition, there are other related works, such as The Thai Encyclopedia: Golden Jubilee Edition and supplementary learning editions of The Thai Youth Encyclopedia.
