= List of tree deities =

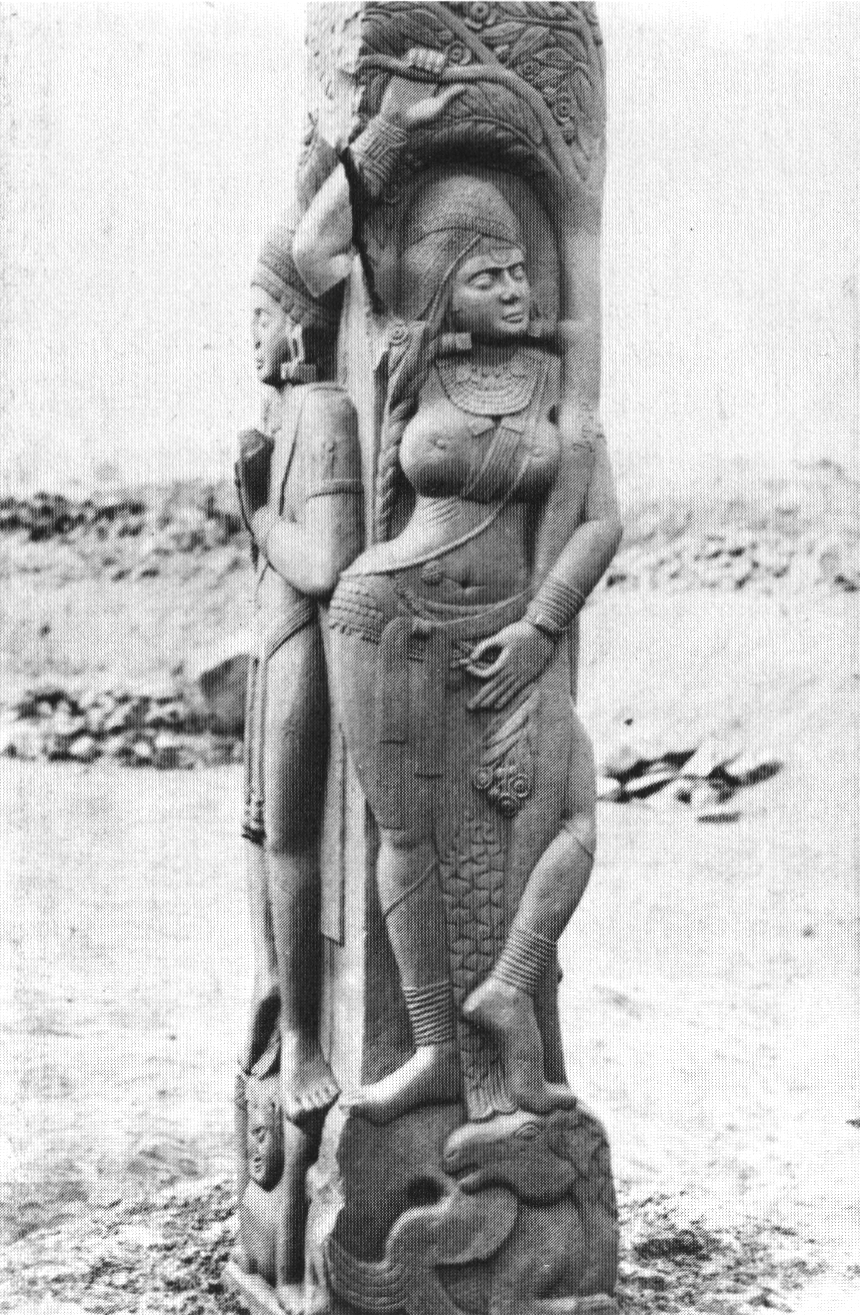
Yakshi under a stylized ashoka tree. Railing figure at Bharhut Stupa, 2nd century BC, India.

A tree deity or tree spirit is a nature deity related to a tree. Such deities are present in many cultures. They are usually represented as a young woman, often connected to ancient fertility and tree worship lore. The status of tree deities varies from that of a local fairy, ghost, sprite or nymph, to that of a goddess.

== Examples of tree deities ==
The Yakshis or Yakshinis (Sanskrit: याक्षिणि), mythical maiden deities of Hindu, Buddhist, and Jain mythology are closely associated with trees, especially the ashoka tree and the sal tree. Although these tree deities are usually benevolent, there are also yakshinis with malevolent characteristics in Indian folklore.

Panaiveriyamman, named after panai, the Tamil name for the Palmyra palm, is an ancient fertility deity linked to this palm that is so important in Tamil culture. This deity is also known as Taalavaasini, a name that further relates her to all types of palm trees. Some other Tamil tree deities are related to ancient agricultural deities, such as Puliyidaivalaiyamman, the deity of the tamarind tree, and Kadambariyamman, associated with the kadamba tree. These were seen as manifestations of a goddess who offers her blessings by giving fruits in abundance.

In Thailand the village ghosts or fairies related to trees such as Nang Takian and Nang Tani are known generically as Nang Mai (นางไม้). There are also other tree ghosts that are male.

Tree deities were common in ancient Northern European lore. However, in Charlemagne's time, following the Capitulatio de partibus Saxoniae in 782, offerings to sacred trees or any other form of worship of the spirits of trees and wells were outlawed. Even as late as 1227 the Synod of Trier decreed that the worship of trees and sources was forbidden.

== List of tree deities ==
Tree deities in different cultures of the world include:

- Anito, various animistic nature spirits in indigenous Philippine mythology are commonly believed to reside in balete trees
- Bà Mộc, Vietnamese goddess of trees
- Chuhaister, Ukrainian tree spirit, also Lisovyk
- Curupira, a powerful Demon/Forest Spirit in Guarani mythology and Brazilian mythology.
- Druantia, hypothetical Gallic tree goddess proposed by Robert Graves in his 1948 study The White Goddess; popular with Neopagans
- Dryads and hamadryads of Greek mythology
- Hathor, also called Lady of the Sycamore in the Old Kingdom of Egypt
- Jinmenju, a tree with human-faced fruits in Japanese and Chinese folklore
- Kodama and Kurozome, the spirit of the Prunus serrulata (Japanese cherry)
- Kukunochi, Japanese tree spirit
- Lauma, a woodland fae, goddess/spirit of trees, marsh and forest in Eastern Baltic mythology
- Leshy, is a tutelary deity of the forests in pagan Slavic mythology along with his wife Leshachikha(or the Kikimora) and children (leshonki, leszonky).
- Meliae, the nymphs of the Fraxinus (Ash tree) in Greek mythology
- Metsaema, mother of the forest in Estonian mythology
- Metsavana, old man of the forest in Estonian mythology
- Mielikki, goddess of the forests in Finnish mythology
- Nang Ta-khian, related to the Hopea odorata (Ta-khian tree) in Thai folklore
- Nang Tani, an ambiguous female spirit who lives in the Musa balbisiana (wild banana tree)
- Nariphon, a tree in Buddhist mythology which bears fruit in the shape of young female creatures
- Penghou, a dog-shaped spirit in Chinese mythology
- Pi-Fang, a Chinese tree deity
- Rakapila, a sacred tree deity of Madagascar
- Salabhanjika, another general term for Hindu tree nymphs
- Sijou Euphorbia milii var. splendens the living embodiment of Bathoubwrai, the supreme deity in the Bathouist religion of the Bodo people or Mech of Assam and Nepal
- Spriggan Tree like creature from Cornish mythology
- Tāne-mahuta, atua (deity) of the forests and birds, and one of the children of Ranginui and Papatūānuku in Māori mythology
- Tapio, god of the forests in Finnish mythology
- Thuyaung fruit trees from Burmese mythology

== Gallery ==
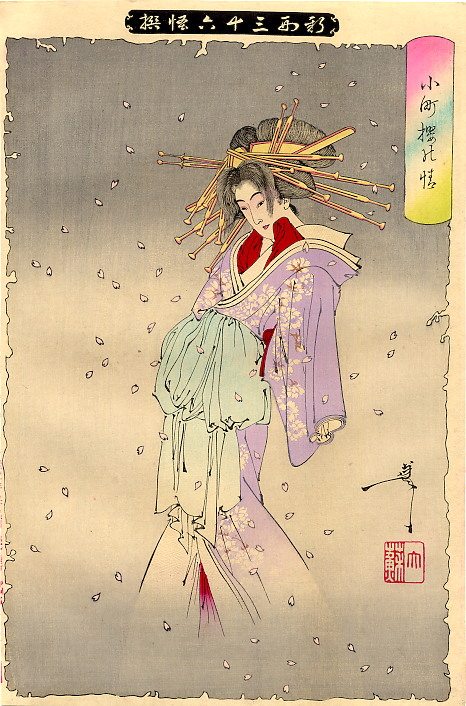
Kurozome, the tree spirit of Prunus serrulata, "Japanese cherry"

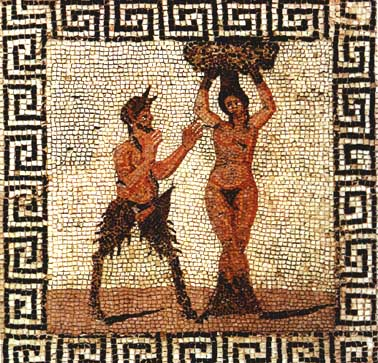
Tile mosaic of Pan and a hamadryad, found in Pompeii

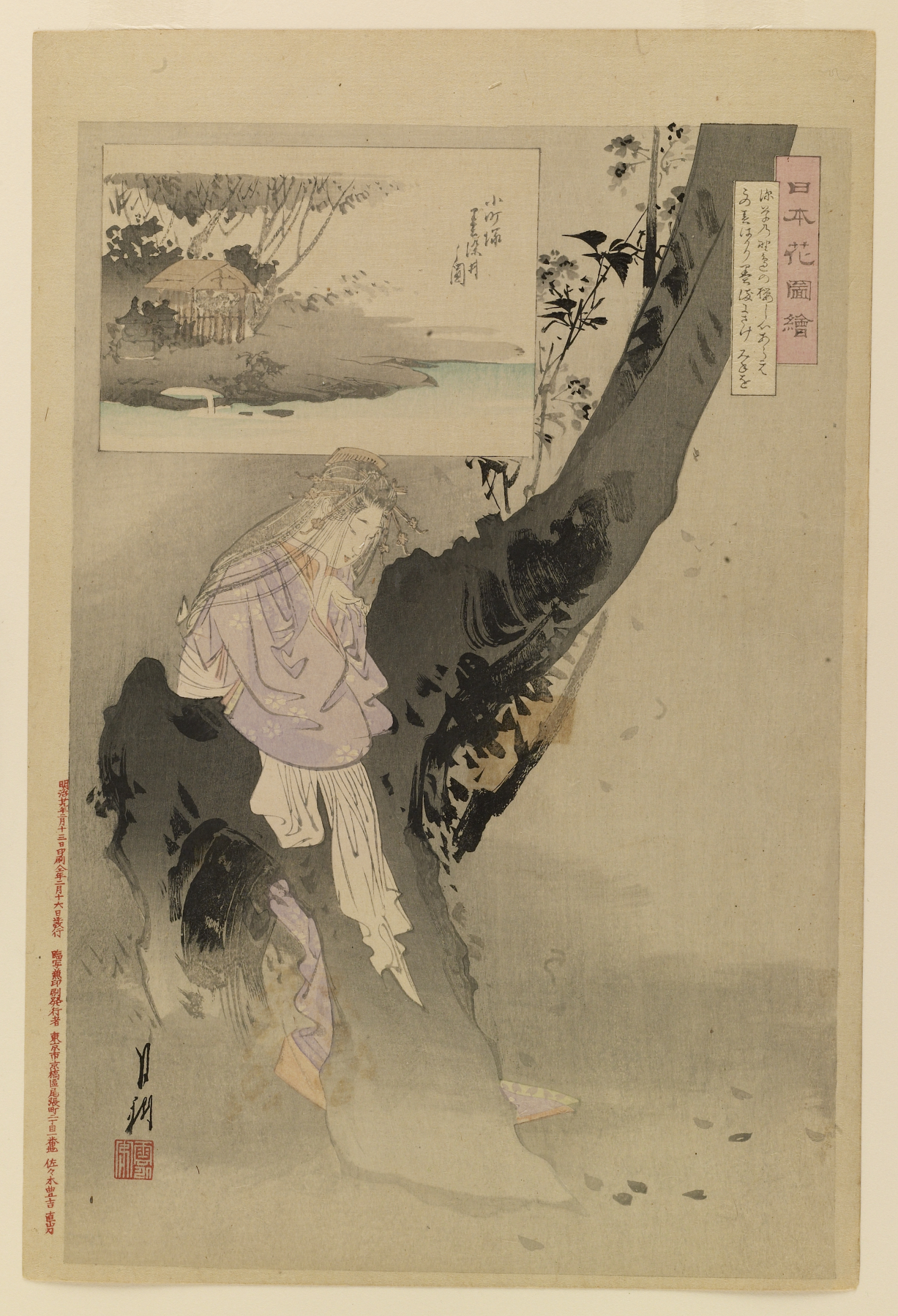
In the play Love Story at the Snow-covered Barrier, the villain's wishes to cut down a giant blossoming black cherry tree are thwarted. As he wields an ax, a courtesan who is the living incarnation of the spirit of the tree manages to freeze the villain's hands. Then the spirit herself appears and overcomes him.

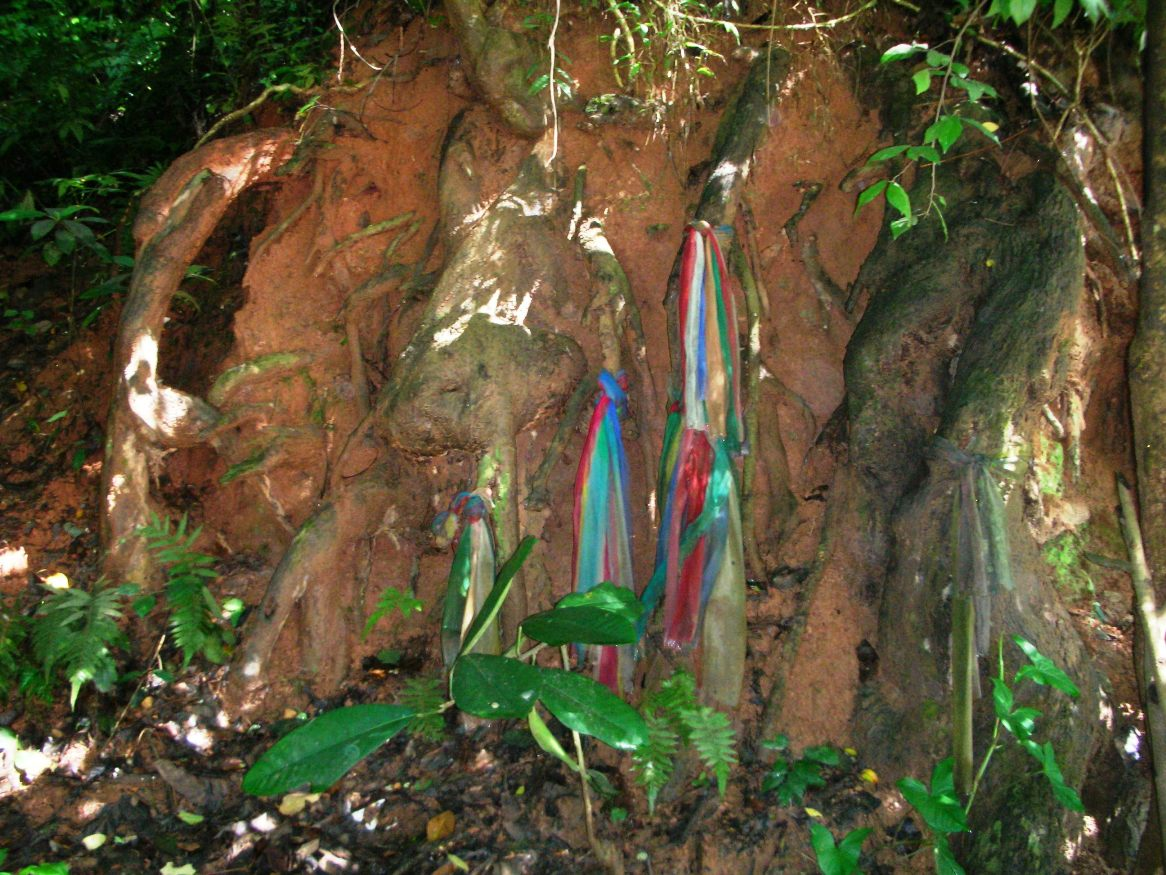
Lengths of brocade tied around the exposed roots of a Hopea odorata or "Ta-khian tree" growing on a steep slope as an offering to Nang Ta-khian

== See also ==
- Akathaso
- Ent
- Nymph
- Plant soul
- Salabhanjika
- Talking tree
- Tree worship
- Vegetation deity
- List of nature deities
- List of deities by classification
