= Thai folklore =

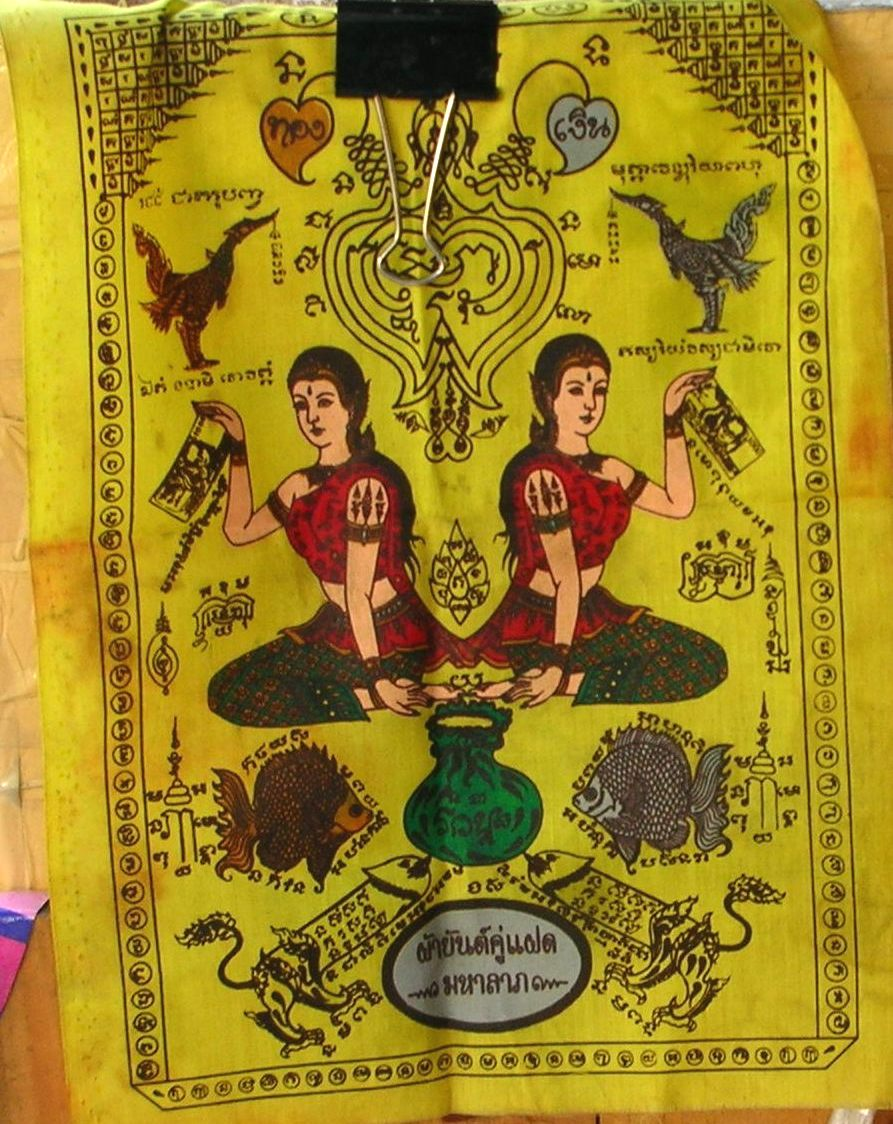
Nang Kwak shopkeeper's good-luck charm in Bangkok

Thai folklore is a diverse set of mythology and traditional beliefs held by Thai people. Thai folklore is believed to connecting with Tai folklore and tradition. In non-academic and colloquial settings, many still believe it has a regional background for it originated in rural Thailand. With the passing of time, and through the influence of the media, large parts of Thai folklore have become interwoven with the wider popular Thai culture.

Phraya Anuman Rajadhon (1888–1969) was the first Thai scholar to seriously study local folkloristics. He took copious notes on humble details of his culture such as the charms used by Thai shopkeepers to attract customers. He also studied in depth the oral literature related to different village spirits and ghosts of Thai lore.

== Folk beliefs ==
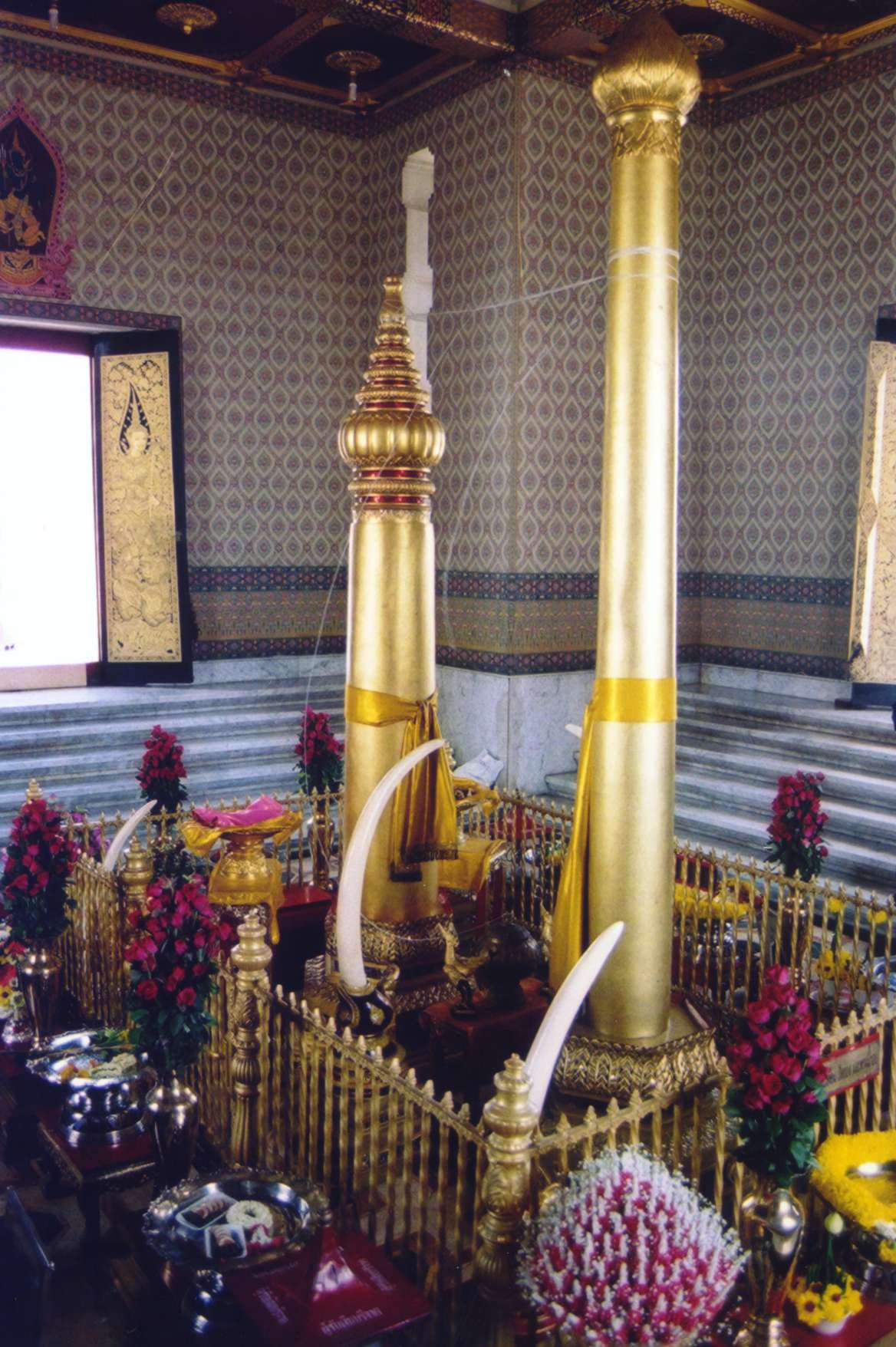
Bangkok city Lak Mueang. The longer pillar is the Rama I original, the shorter was added by King Mongkut (Rama IV)

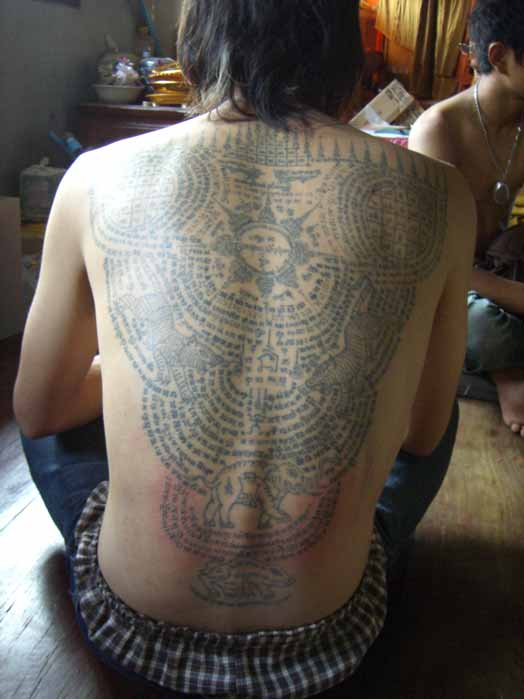
Yantra tattoo for protection

The core of Thai folklore is rooted in Tai folk religion. Until they were recorded, folk beliefs were handed down from one generation to the next.

Village shamans are known as phram, a word that has its origin in Brahmana. The phram conducts exorcisms and performs marriages, among other ceremonies.

Another important figure in Thai folk religion is the mo phi (หมอผี) or shaman who would also conduct rituals. To invoke spirits of the dead, four sticks are planted at equal distance from each other on the ground near the burial or cremation place. A thread is tied around the sticks forming a protective square and a mat is spread in the middle, where the mo phi sits down. In front of him, outside of the square there is a mo khao terracotta jar with a yantra painted on the outside containing the ashes or bones of the dead person. Beside the jar there is also a plate of rice as an offering and a stick or switch to keep the spirits at bay.

In order to be protected against bad luck, charms and amulets for bringing luck or for protection are popular in Thailand. Some of these are tied around the body or worn as a necklace, while others come in the form of yantra tattooing. The yantra endows the wearer with supernatural protection, love, health, and wealth. In order to bring luck and provide protection, yants are also drawn in the receptions of multinational companies, the entrances of supermarkets, and the interiors of taxis, trucks, and airplanes.

In shops and houses, often next to a shelf with a Buddha statuette, charms for attracting customers are hung. These include printed pieces of cloth of fish-shaped figures, as well as streamers or framed pictures of a crocodile or of Suvannamaccha, the mermaid character of the Siamese version of the Ramayana. Some of these charms have their origin in the culture of the Thai Chinese, as Phraya Anuman Rajadhon observed, but they have been adopted by the Thai people, often with changes.

=== Miscellaneous folk beliefs ===
Superstitions of the Thai people include:

- Auspicious dates. Identification of auspicious dates and moments is common in Thai culture. This is especially important when setting a wedding date, as well as when building a house or purchasing a car.
- Lucky numbers. Divination techniques are often used to predict numbers before buying a lottery ticket.
- Cutting one's hair or fingernails. Wednesday is regarded as a highly inauspicious day for having a haircut.
- Shapes on the moon. In Thai folk belief the dark spots on the moon, the lunar maria, form either a rabbit shape or the shape of a man and a woman pounding rice.
- Gecko. The chirping sounds of different species of geckos native to Thailand have different interpretations according to the moment and occasion. Also, if a gecko happens to fall on or near someone in a home or veranda, it has a meaning which is auspicious or inauspicious depending on the side on which it falls.
- Auspicious colors. Since certain colors may be auspicious for certain persons, much thought is given to the color of a car before acquiring it. Also in the case of taxicabs certain colors that are deemed unlucky will be avoided. Taxicabs in Bangkok come in various colors and formerly a number of taxis were violet, but these have been repainted in recent years for violet was considered an unlucky color, both by cabdrivers and customers.
- Rainbow. A rainbow is held in high regard and it is important to avoid pointing at it because one would lose one's finger.

=== Deities ===
- Nang Kwak (นางกวัก) is a benevolent female deity that brings luck to business owners and attracts customers. She is widely considered the patron of traders and shopkeepers and can be seen in almost every business establishment in Thailand.
- Phi Fa (ผีฟ้า) is an ancient deity of Isan folklore. In her malevolent aspect she is related to Phosop.
- Phosop (โพสพ) is the traditional and ancient rice goddess of Thailand. She is part of very ancient Thai folklore rather than of the mainstream Buddhist religion. In order to propitiate her during the different stages of the harvest, ritual offerings known as Cha Laeo used to be periodically made in villages and hamlets in rural areas.
- Kuman Thong, represented as the effigy of a young boy, is believed to bring good luck.

=== Spirits and ghosts ===
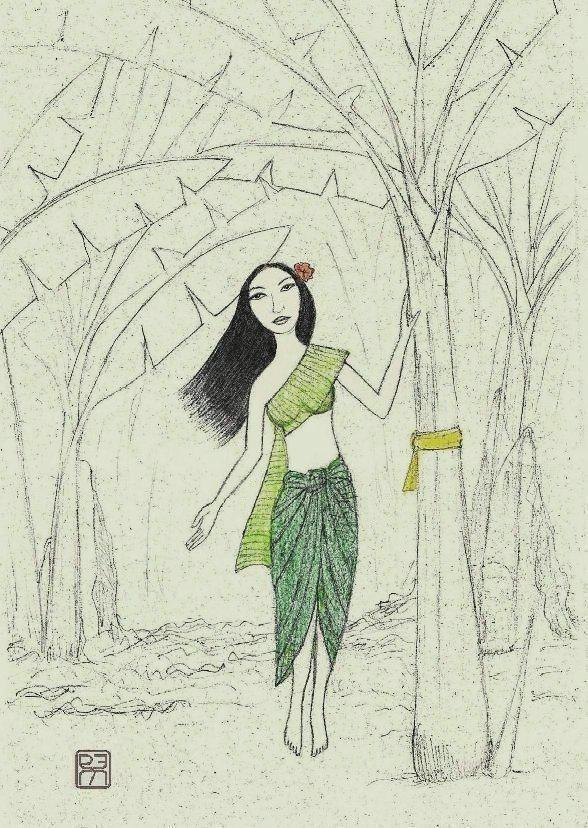
Nang Tani, the female spirit that haunts banana trees

Spirits or ghosts are known generically as phi (ผี) and they may be found, among other places, in certain trees, burial grounds near Buddhist temples, some houses, as well as mountains and forests. The Phi Pan Nam Range (ทิวเขาผีปันน้ำ), "The mountain range of the spirits dividing the waters" that divides the Mekong from the Chao Phraya watershed, is named after the ancient spirits believed to dwell in the mountains.

Spirit houses, known as san phra phum (ศาลพระภูมิ) in Thai language, are small shrines to provide a home for the tutelary spirits of a place. They are common near trees and groves and in urban areas, close to buildings. It is considered a bad omen to neglect these spots and offerings are regularly made by people living nearby.

The local beliefs regarding the nocturnal village spirits of Thailand were studied by Phraya Anuman Rajadhon. Most spirits were traditionally not represented in paintings or drawings, hence they are purely based on stories of the oral tradition.

Thai cinema, Thai television soap operas and Thai comics have contributed to popularize the spirits and legends of the folklore of Thailand. Phraya Anuman Rajadhon established that most of the contemporary iconography of folk ghosts has its origins in Thai films that have become classics.

Most of the spirits or ghosts are so popular they appear regularly in comic books as well as in films, including the Nak animated movie for children. The most well-known are the following:

- Chao Kam Nai Wen (เจ้ากรรมนายเวร), the spirit of a person with whom one has previously interacted, usually appearing as a spirit who sitting on someone's back
- Krahang (กระหัง), a male ghost that flies in the night
- Krasue (กระสือ), a woman's head with her viscera hanging down from the neck
- Mae Nak (แม่นาก), a female ghost who died at childbirth and that can extend her arms
- Phi Am (ผีอำ), a spirit that sits on a person's chest during the night
- Phi Hua Khat (ผีหัวขาด), a headless male ghost that carries his head
- Phi Phraya (ผีพราย), a female ghost living in the water
- Phi Phong (ผีโพง), a malevolent male ghost having an unpleasant smell. It lives in dark places under the vegetation
- Phi Pop (ผีปอบ), a malevolent female spirit that devours human entrails
- Phi Song Nang (ผีสองนาง), female ghosts that first lure, and then attack and kill young men
- Phi Tai Hong (ผีตายโหง), the ghost of a person who suffered a sudden violent or cruel death
- Phi Tai Thong Klom (ผีตายทั้งกลม), the wrathful ghost of a woman having committed suicide after being made pregnant and subsequently betrayed and abandoned by her lover
- Phi Thale (ผีทะเล), a spirit of the sea, which manifests itself in different ways
- Pret (เปรต), an extremely tall hungry ghost looking like a large and thin man with a very small mouth
- Nang Mai (นางไม้; "Lady of the Wood"), a type of female tree spirits or fairies.
- Nang Takian (นางตะเคียน), a spirit living in Hopea odorata trees
- Nang Tani (นางตานี), a young woman haunting certain clumps of banana trees that appears on full moon nights

=== Festivals ===
Some traditional celebrations, including Buddhist festivals, provide an opportunity for the expression of local folk beliefs.

- Loi Krathong, on the evening of the full moon of the 12th month in the traditional Thai lunar calendar
- Mo Lam (Mor Lam), a traditional Isan song and dance festival
- Phi Ta Khon, ghost festival of Loei Province is part of the Buddhist merit-making holiday also known as Bun Phawet (Thet Mahachat).
- Prapheni Bun Bang Fai, the traditional rocket festival of the ethnic Lao people
- Thet Mahachat, the Buddhist festival of the Great Sermon is colored with strong folkloric elements. It is celebrated in different ways across Thailand and neighboring Buddhist countries

== Folk tales ==
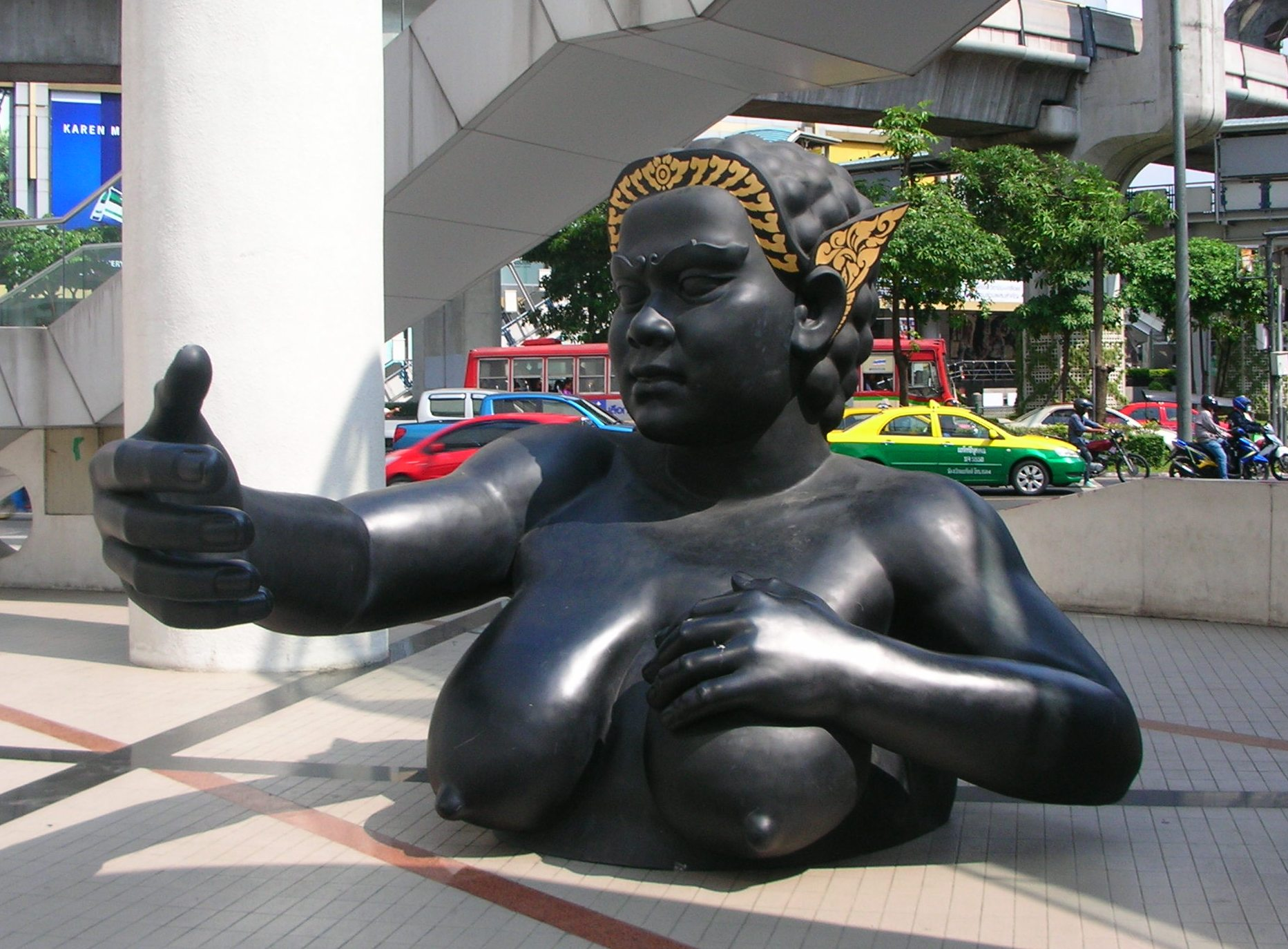
Female yak in Bangkok. Such ogresses (nang yak) are common main characters of Thai legends

Folk tales and legends in Thailand were used by elders to instill beliefs in the younger generation. Most stories contain moral lessons teaching the importance of following traditions and to display reverence to elders, parents, and superiors. The stories of the spirit world taught children to be cautious, to stay at home at night, and to respect customs regarding death rituals and the importance of offerings.

Many Thai folk tales are based on the texts of Buddhism. Also some of the stories of classical Thai literature, such as Khun Chang Khun Phaen (ขุนช้างขุนแผน) and Lilit Phra Lo (ลิลิตพระลอ), a story about young lovers with a tragic end, originated in folk tales. Phra Aphai Mani is a Thai epic poem that has inspired local folklore.

Throughout Thailand there are also local folk stories connected with particular geographic features, such as the story of Doi Nang Non (ดอยนางนอน), the "Mountain of the Sleeping Lady" and the legend about the formation of Khao Sam Roi Yot mountains and islands.

=== Buddhist folk tradition ===
The Jataka tales, such as the Vessantara Jataka, the Twelve Sisters, and Prince Samuttakote (Samuddaghosa), have provided inspiration to Thai traditional storytellers. These Jatakas have been often retold, abridged, and adapted to fit local culture in Southeast Asian countries, such as Thailand, Burma, Cambodia, Laos, Malaysia, and Indonesia. As a consequence, they have become so familiar to average people that they fully belong to the folklore of their respective country. Often each country claims the story as its own cultural achievement. Thailand is no exception.

Sang Thong (Suvannasankhajātaka), where the marriage between a man and a woman of different social status is the main subject of the story, and Honwichai and Kawi are also long traditional stories. The "Woodcutter who lost his Axe" is a well-liked Thai tale with a moral lesson promoting honesty.

Sri Thanonchai is a trickster which tricks people with his word.

Many figures of the Buddhist tradition have been fully incorporated into Thai lore, among these are the yaksa (ยักษ์), ogres (yaksha), and ogresses (Pali: Yakkhini), the tall and scary Prets (เปรต), Ongkhuliman (องคุลิมาล), the violent criminal named after the garland of the fingers of his victims he wore around his neck, as well as Nariphon, the mythical tree of Buddhist literature bearing fruits in the shape of young girls.

Vivid descriptions of the torments of hell, sometimes in the form of garish sculptures, are to be found in some Buddhist temples in Thailand. These representations are so popular that, along with figures of local spirits, they have become a regular feature in present-day Thai comics.

=== Animals in folklore ===
The mynah is featured in some tales for its ability to talk and imitate sounds. The "Hen and her six chicks", explaining the origin of the Pleiades, "The White Crows" and tales with elephants such as "The Elephant, the Monkey and the Quail", and "The Elephants and the Bees" are common folk tales, some of which are based on the Panchatantra.

Snakes are part of the Thai popular lore, and depending on the background of the tale or myth, they have different meanings. Nak (นาค), Nagas figure in some stories of local folklore and are represented as well in Buddhist temples as architectural elements. Male lust is often popularly represented as a snake growing on top of the head of the lustful man. Thai folk mythology also includes the idea of a link between snakes and women. Some stories based on snakes have been made into Thai movies.

== Folk art and craft ==
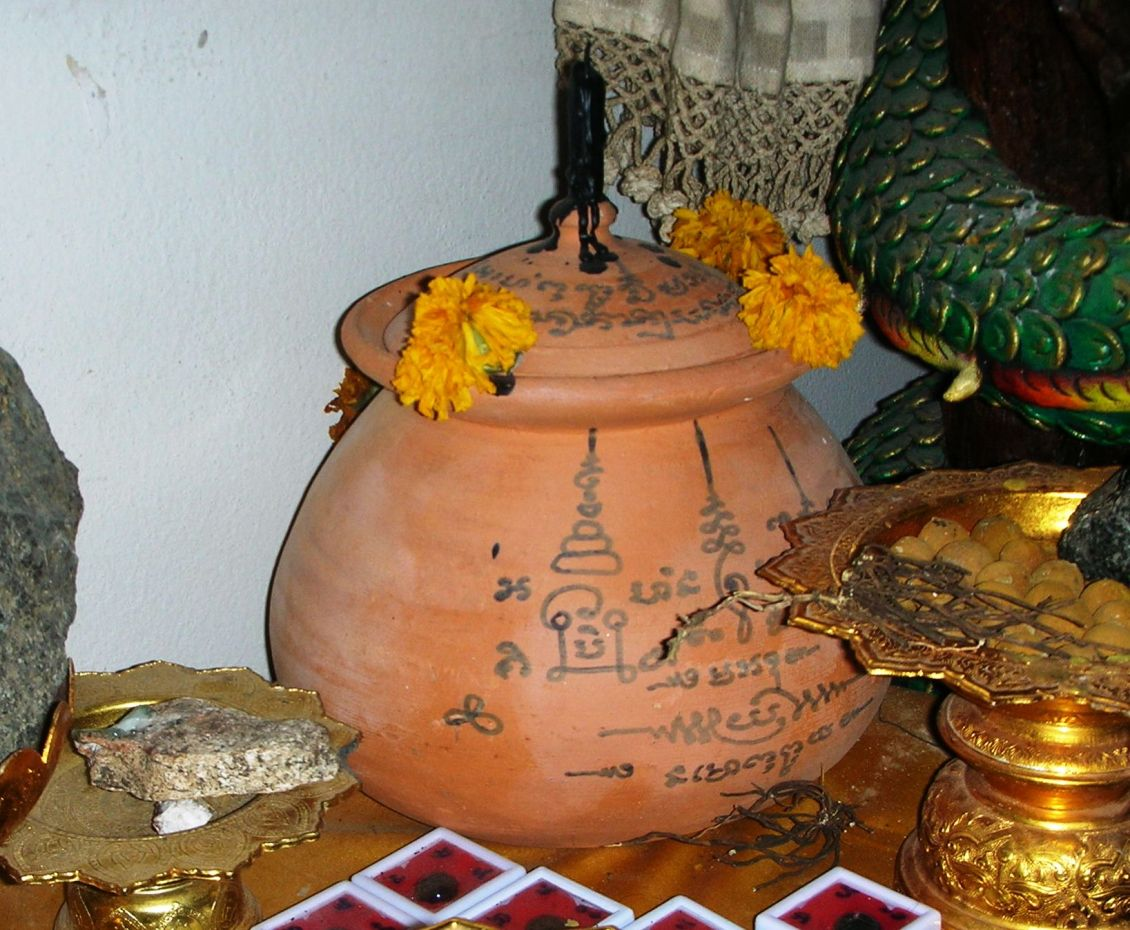
Mo Khao (หม้อข้าว) clay pot with yantra inscriptions and a candle

The articles listed below are an essential part of Thai folklore. Some were articles of daily household use in rural areas.

- Kan Tam Khao (การตำข้าว), the long wooden pestle of a traditional manual rice pounder.
- Mo Khao (หม้อข้าว ). A traditional Thai clay pot (หม้อดิน) widely used formerly to cook rice. It is also used in ceremonies to invoke spirits as well as to capture evil ghosts and banish them.
- Kradong (กระด้ง), a round rice winnowing basket. The large ones are known as Kradong Mon (กระด้งมอญ). Phi Krahang uses two large winnowing baskets to fly in the night.
- Prakham (ประคํา), the Buddhist prayer beads. Witch doctors usually wear a necklace of beads.

=== Thai Buddha amulet ===
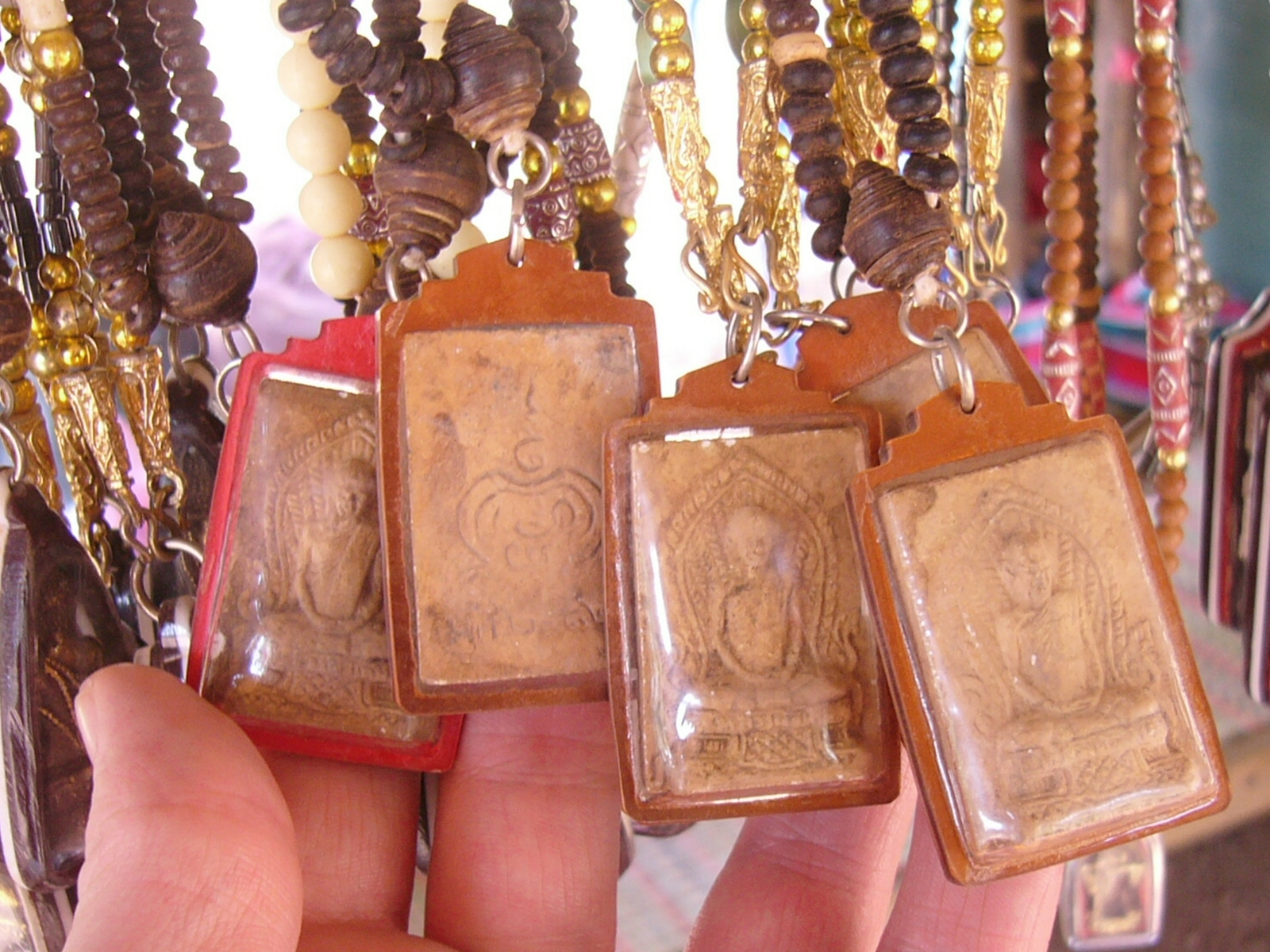
Thai amulets

Thai Buddha amulet (Thai: พระเครื่อง) is a kind of Thai Buddhist blessed item. It is used for raising funds in order to help the temple producing the amulets. Worshippers can obtain an amulets or Thai Buddhist monk blessing by simply donating money or offering oil to the temple. After the donation, Thai Buddhist monk will give amulet as a gift to them. With the change of time, amulet no longer simply means as a "gift", but a kind of tool to help enhance luck in different aspects, some people use amulets to improve marriage, wealth, health, love and people relationship.

== See also ==
- Phi Fa
- Thai folk dance
- Music of Thailand (section Traditional or folk)
- Phosop, the rice goddess.
- Pong Lang Sa On
- Thai culture
