= Jinmenju =

Yōkai and Yaoguai in Japanese and Chinese folklore

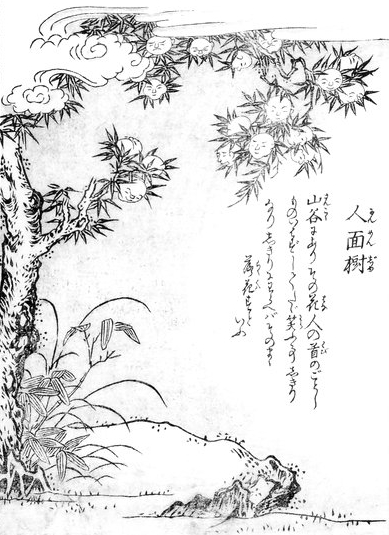
"Jinjenju" (人面樹) from the Konjaku Hyakki Shūi by Toriyama Sekien

Jinmenju or Ninmenju (Chinese: 人面樹; pinyin: Rénmiànshù; Japanese: 人面樹 [にんめんじゅ、じんめんじゅ]; lit. 'human-faced tree') is a type of Yōkai and Yaoguai in Japanese and Chinese folklore. It is commonly depicted as a tree bearing flowers that resemble human heads. It notably appears in the Edo period Konjaku Hyakki Shūi by Toriyama Sekien.

== Concept ==
The Konjaku Hyakki Shūi depicts it as a tree blooming with flowers that resemble human heads, with the following explanatory text:

In mountain valleys, its flowers just like human heads, without a word, they merely just smile away, smile away until its petals fall just like that (山谷にあり その花人の首のごとし ものいはずしてたゞ笑ふ事しきりなり しきりにわらへば そのまま落花すといふ)

Besides Japanese yōkai, the Konjaku Hyakki Shūi also included publications of plants, animals and yōkai outside of Japan. Other sources naming the "jinmenju" include the Wakan Sansai Zue, and a quote from the Chinese Sancai Tuhui, which describes a similar tree from a land called "Dashiguo" (Chinese and Japanese: 大食国; pinyin: Dàshíguó; romaji: Daishikoku; lit. 'big-eat country').

According to the Sancai Tuhui, Dashiguo is a land one thousand li southwest, with flowers like human heads, and upon asking it questions, its flowers would laugh, but it wouldn't understand human language. If they laughed too much, the flowers would wither and fall. The Rōō Sawa (老媼茶話), a collection of strange tales from Aizu, also quotes the Sancai Tuhui while making statements about this tree.

== See also ==
- List of tree deities
- Nariphon
- Wāḳwāḳ
- Zaqqum
