= Nak (film) =

- Theatrical release poster
- Directed by: Natthaphong Ratanachoksirikul
- Written by: Saenee Jitsuwanwattana
- Produced by: Prachya Pinkaew; Boyd Kosiyabong
- Starring: Sasikan Apichataworasin; Chukiet Auimsuk; Supab Chaiwisuthikun; Anyarit Pitakkul; Nawarat Techarathanaprasert; Petchtai Wongkamlao
- Cinematography: Natthaphong Ratanachoksirikul
- Edited by: Natthaphong Ratanachoksirikul
- Music by: Boyd Kosiyabong; Traithep Wongpaiboon
- Production companies: Baa-ram-ewe; Beboyd CG
- Distributed by: Sahamongkol Film International
- Release date: 3 April 2008
- Running time: 100 minutes
- Country: Thailand
- Language: Thai
- Box office: $270,308

Nak (Thai: นาค) is a Thai animated dark fantasy action-adventure comedy horror film that was released on April 3, 2008 and later aired on television in Thai PBS Kids. Directed by Natthaphong Ratanachoksirikul and produced by Prachya Pinkaew and Boyd Kosiyabong, it stars Sasikan Apichataworasin, Chukiet Auimsuk, Supab Chaiwisuthikun, Anyarit Pitakkul, Nawarat Techarathanaprasert and Petchtai Wongkamlao. The films follows the titular ghost Mae Nak (Apichataworasin) and her friends fight against a powerful evil spirit that threatens mankind.

Nak is based on ghosts of the Thai folklore, who in this film shed their sinister reputation and are the heroes. Other spirits familiar to Thai people that appear in this film are Phi Hua Kat, Krahang, Krasue, Phi Am, Nang Tani, Nang Takian and Phi Phong.

Ghosts from other backgrounds such as Phi Yipun, a well-known vengeful ghost (onryō) from Japanese horror films based on the Yotsuya Kaidan story, also have a role in this film.

== Plot ==
In a world where the human and spirit realms exist in parallel, divided by day and night, humans and spirits once lived peacefully together. Spirits aided humans, who reciprocated with offerings. In modern times, however, the spirit realm has changed, and new-generation spirits have become vengeful and evil after being disrespected by humans and their activities.

In rural Thailand, a human boy named Tee is saved from evil spirits by spirits led by the female spirit Mae Nak. That night, Tee and his sister Gaem attend a temple fair and watch an open-air film, but the cloaked ghost and his followers attack. One of them, Phi Yipun, abducts Tee, who bears a mysterious mark on his neck, and attempts to take Gaem. Nak, the Phi Hua Kat warrior Kieow, the dog spirit Thonk and the pret Eout save her.

Kieow, Thonk and Eout persuade Gaem to enter the spirit realm. There, the Krasue shaman reveals a prophecy that evil spirits will invade the human realm during a solar eclipse, using the human with the mysterious mark as a key to absorb sunlight. Tee is that human. When the other spirits refuse to fight because of their age, Nak vows to fight alone, until Gaem appears and convinces them to rescue Tee. The Krasue shaman instead orders the spirits to evacuate and asks Nak to protect Gaem.

On the train to Bangkok, Nak tells Gaem about her son, whom she has not seen for many years. Meanwhile, the cloaked ghost takes Tee to the evil spirits' headquarters, where his master, the fireball ghost, imprisons him for a sacrificial ritual. After arriving at Bangkok railway station, Gaem and Nak discover that Kieow, Thonk and Eout have followed them. They travel by ghostly tuk tuk to the headquarters and infiltrate it, but the fireball ghost's guards ambush them. Phi Yipun captures Nak, while Kieow, Thonk and Eout are taken prisoner by Japanese evil spirits.

When the solar eclipse begins, the ritual starts and the evil spirits attack Bangkok. Led by Gaem, the spirits rescue Nak and fight the fireball ghost's army. Nak defeats Phi Yipun, while Gaem frees Tee, allowing sunlight to destroy several of the fireball ghost's soldiers, including Eout. The fireball ghost orders the cloaked ghost to attack Tee and Gaem, but Nak protects them. She then reveals that the cloaked ghost is her long-lost son Daeng, who was taken by the dark sorcerer after defeating Nak in the past.

Nak urges Daeng to do what is right. The enraged fireball ghost, revealed as the dark sorcerer in spirit form, attacks Nak. Seeing his mother injured, Daeng turns against his master, who merges with his army to become the demon. Daeng and the other spirits fight the sorcerer but are overwhelmed. The Krasue shaman and the other spirits eventually destroy him with their magic, but he unleashes fiery needles against the humans and spirits. Nak shields them and faints.

After everyone escapes the headquarters, the surviving sorcerer possesses its statue and attacks them. As the humans and spirits, including the revived Eout, flee, Daeng sacrifices himself to destroy the sorcerer permanently. Nak learns of her son's sacrifice, and Daeng bids farewell before ascending to the afterlife. Afterwards, Gaem and Tee return home and reunite with their mother, while Nak and the other spirits watch happily.

== Cast ==
- Sasikan Apichataworasin as Mae Nak, the titular female spirit who has the ability to elongated her arms and the film's main protagonist. Her striking fuchsia-colored hair and eyes in this film are a departure from her alleged looks in traditional lore though.
- Petchtai Wongkamlao as Kieow, a green Phi Hua Kat warrior who has the martial arts skill.
- Supab Chaiwisuthikun as Thonk, a yellow dog spirit who uses the bones as a melee weapons.
- Chukiet Auimsuk as Eout, a blue pret who has the ability to shapeshift his body.
- Aunyarit Pitaktikul as Tee, a human boy who serves as a key to unleash the evil spirits to attack the human realm.
- Nawarat Techarathanaprasert as Gaem, a human girl and Tee's older sister.
- Somchai Sakdikul as the fireball ghost, the leader of the evil spirits, the dark sorcerer and the film's main antagonist.
- Nantana Boon-long as Daeng, Nak's long-lost son who works for the fireball ghost.

== See also ==
- List of Thai films
- Ghosts in Thai culture
- Thai folklore
