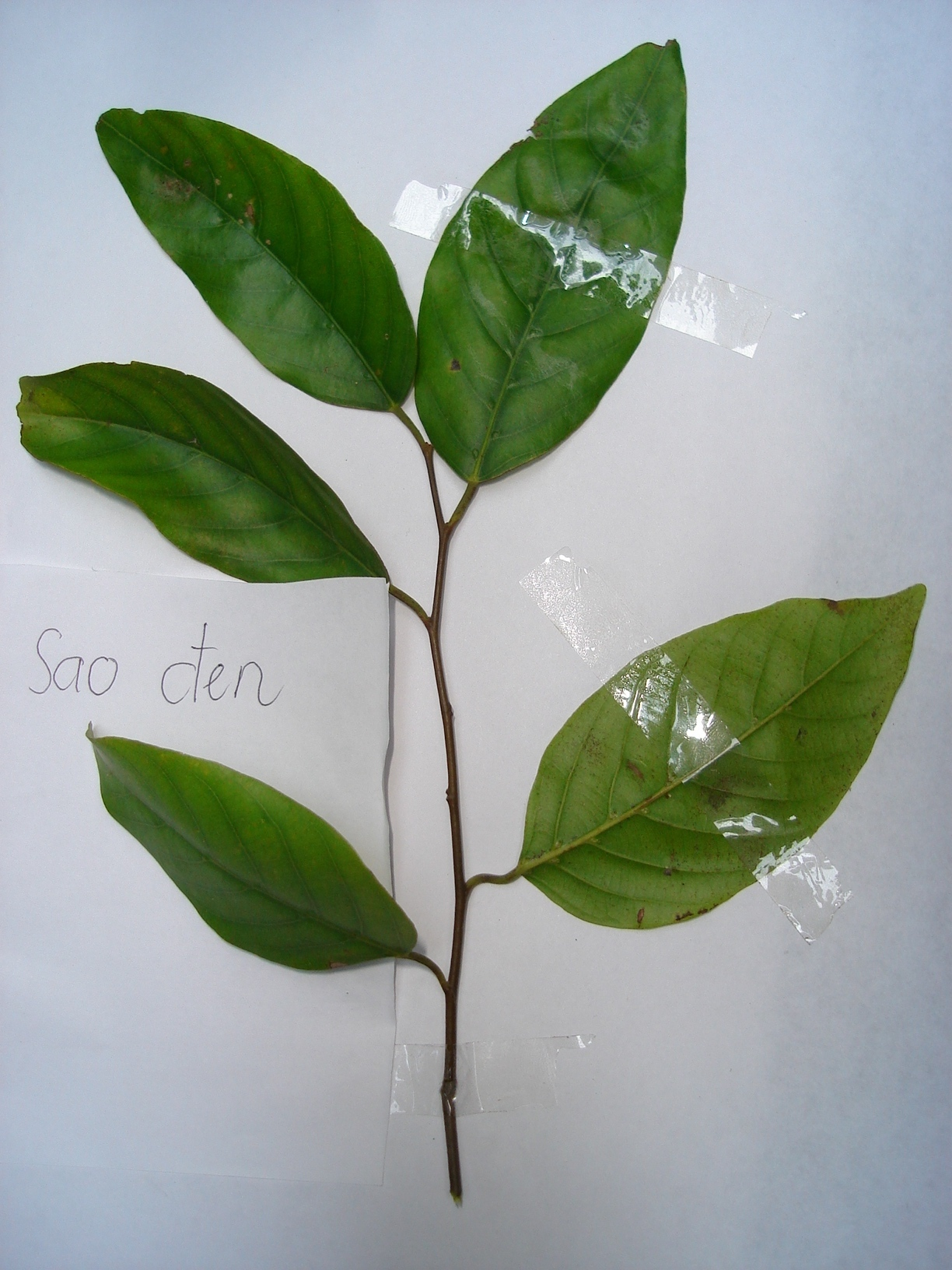
- Leaves of Hopea odorata

Conservation status
- Vulnerable (IUCN 3.1)

Scientific classification
- Kingdom: Plantae
- Clade: Embryophytes
- Clade: Tracheophytes
- Clade: Angiosperms
- Clade: Eudicots
- Clade: Rosids
- Order: Malvales
- Family: Dipterocarpaceae
- Genus: Hopea
- Species: H. odorata

Binomial name
- Hopea odorata Roxb.

Synonyms
- List: Hopea vasta Wall. nom. inval.; Hopea wightiana Miq. ex Dyer nom. inval.

= Hopea odorata =

Species of tree

Hopea odorata is a species of tree in the plant family Dipterocarpaceae. It is found in Bangladesh, Cambodia, India, Laos, Malaysia, Singapore, Myanmar, Thailand, and Vietnam.

== Description ==
H. odorata is a large tree reaching up to 45 m (150 ft) in height with the base of the trunk reaching a diameter of 4.5 m (15 ft). It grows in seasonal tropical forests, preferably near rivers, at elevations up to 900 m (3,000 ft). The seeds are about 6 mm, with two wings that are 50-60 mm long. In places such as West Bengal, the Andaman Islands and southern Vietnam it is often planted as a shade tree. Valued for its wood, which shows resistance to termites, it is a threatened species in its natural habitat.

== Traditions ==
In Thailand, where it is known as ta-khian (Thai: ตะเคียน), this tree is believed to be inhabited by a certain tree spirit known as Lady Ta-khian (Thai: นางตะเคียน), belonging to a type of ghosts related to trees known generically as Nang Mai (นางไม้). This tree species is also the subject of legends in Cambodia, where it is known as Koki; in Vietnam it is called Sao đen.

== Gallery ==
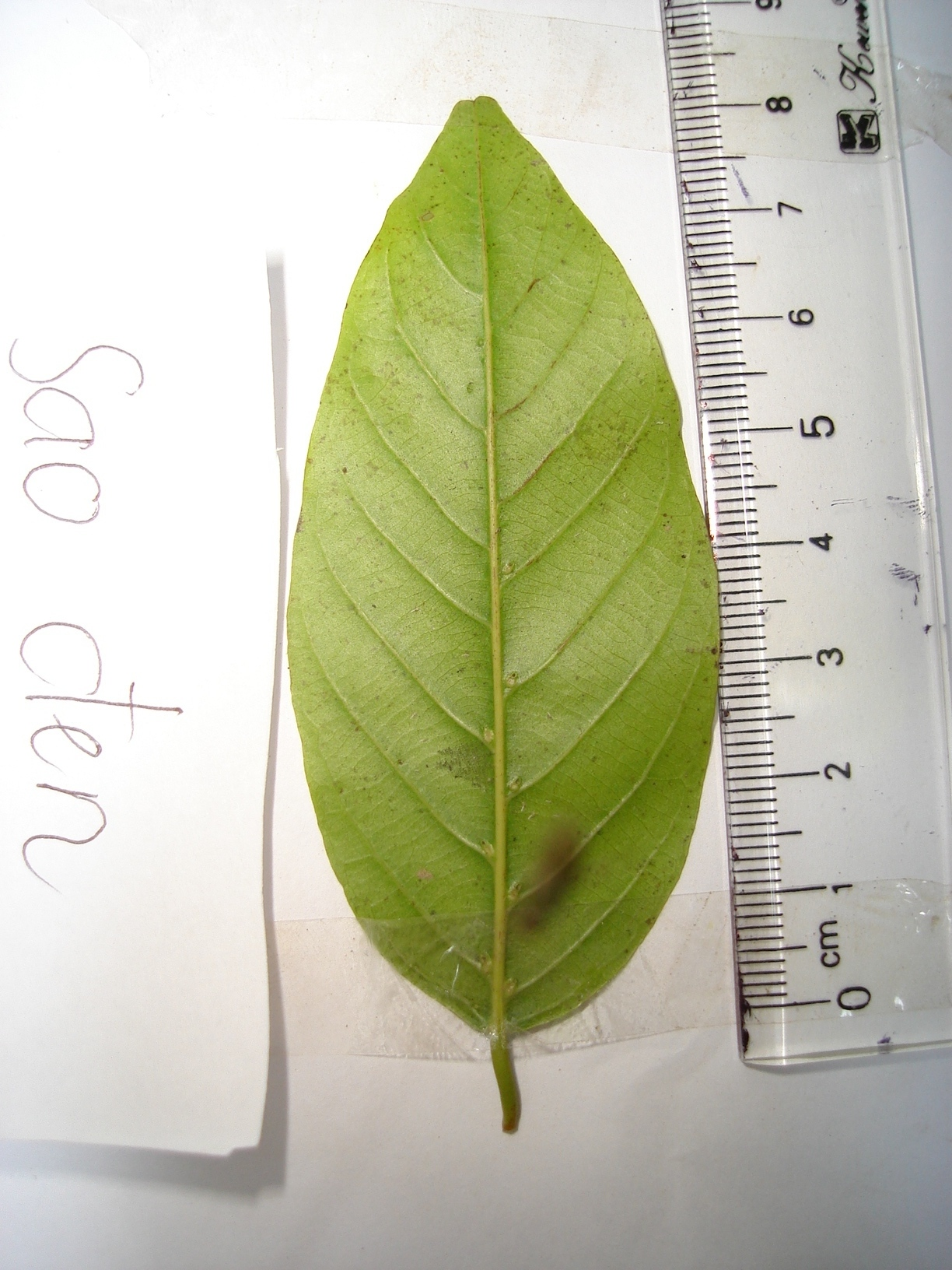
A leaf of Hopea odorata

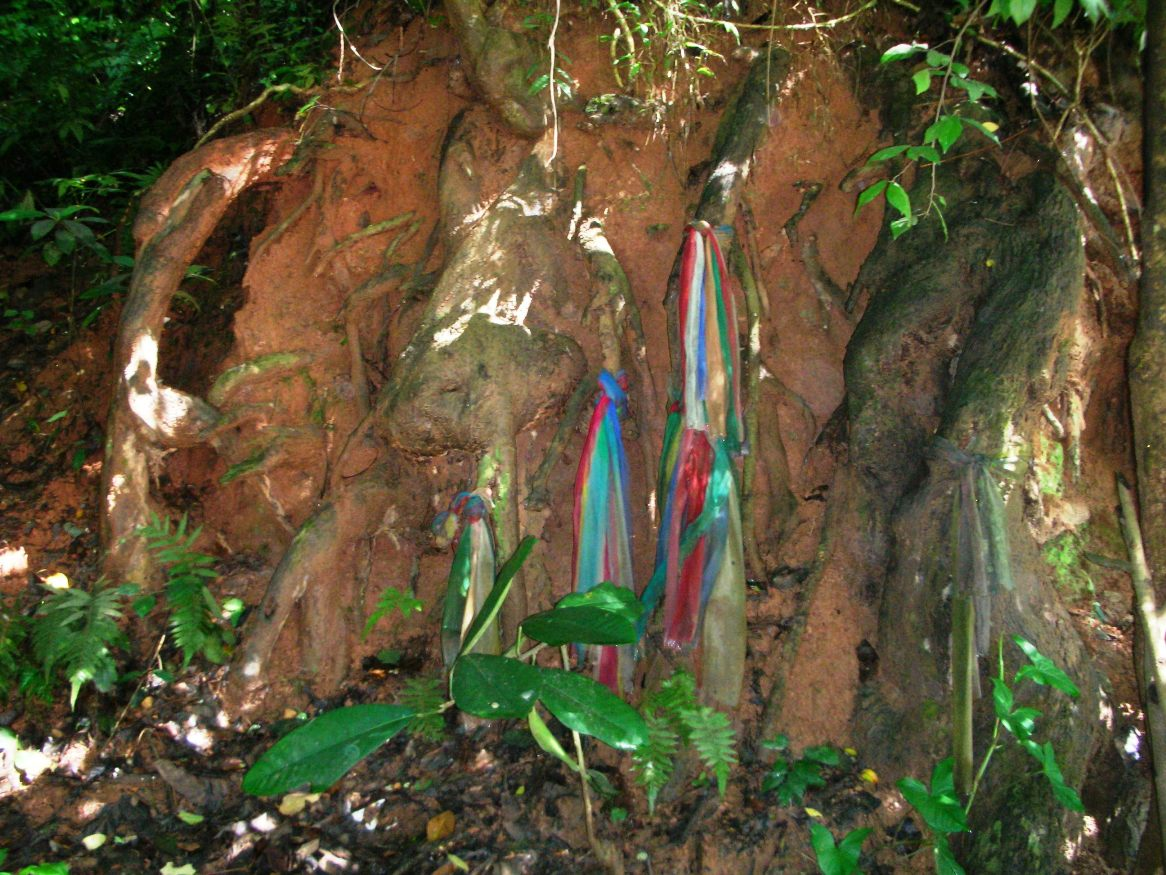
Lengths of brocade tied around the exposed roots of a Hopea odorata tree (ตะเคียน) growing on a steep slope as an offering to Nang Ta-khian

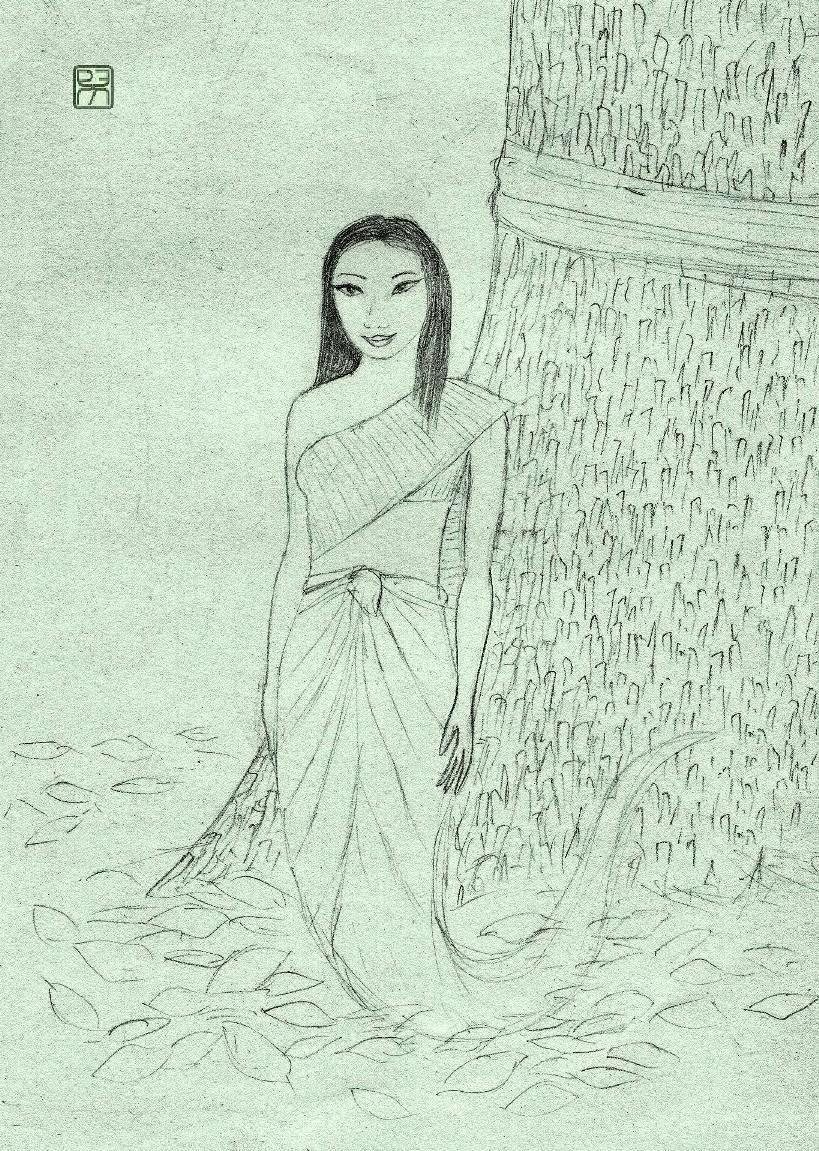
Nang Ta-khian

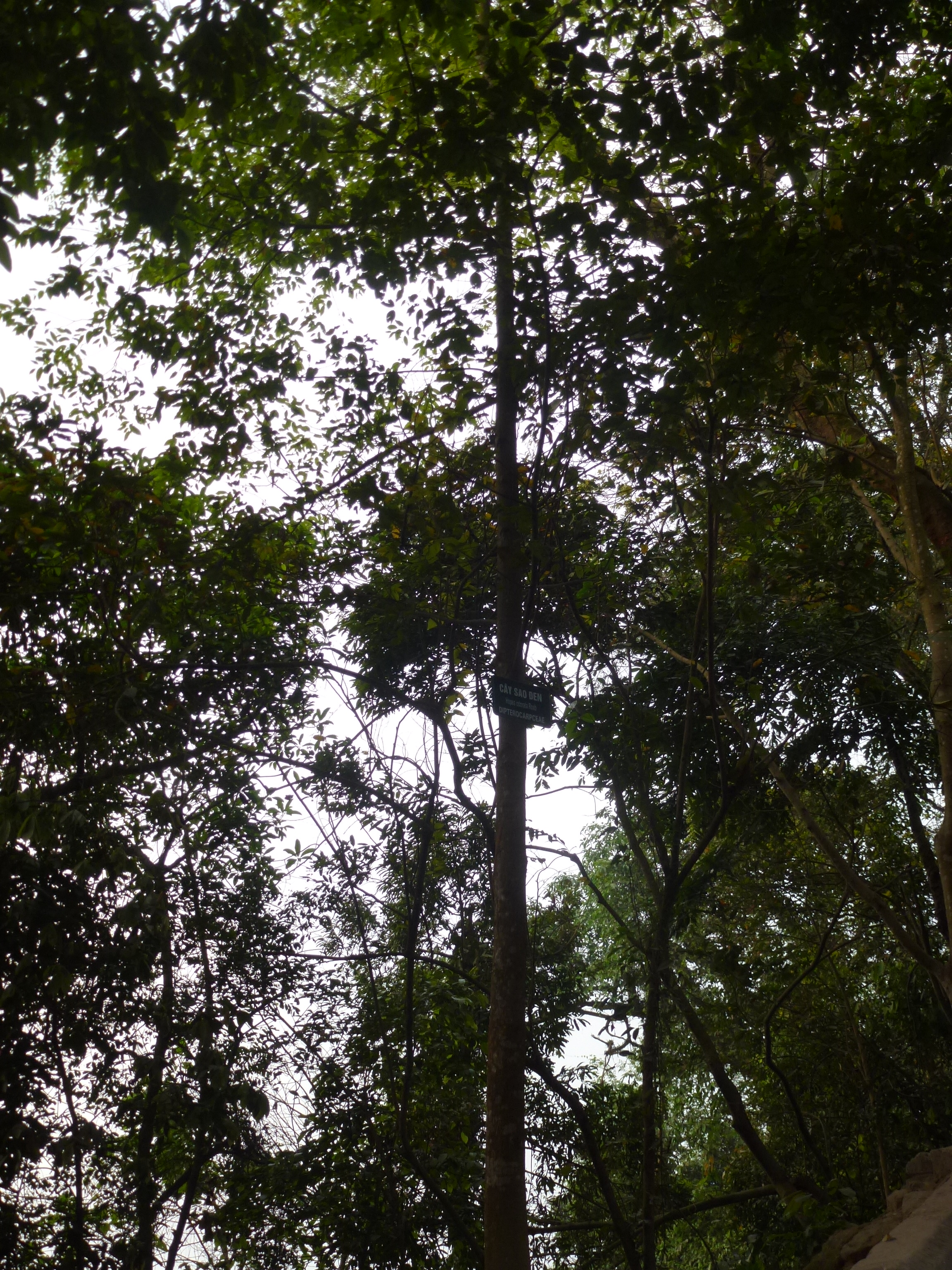
Hopea odorata at Hùng Temple, Vietnam

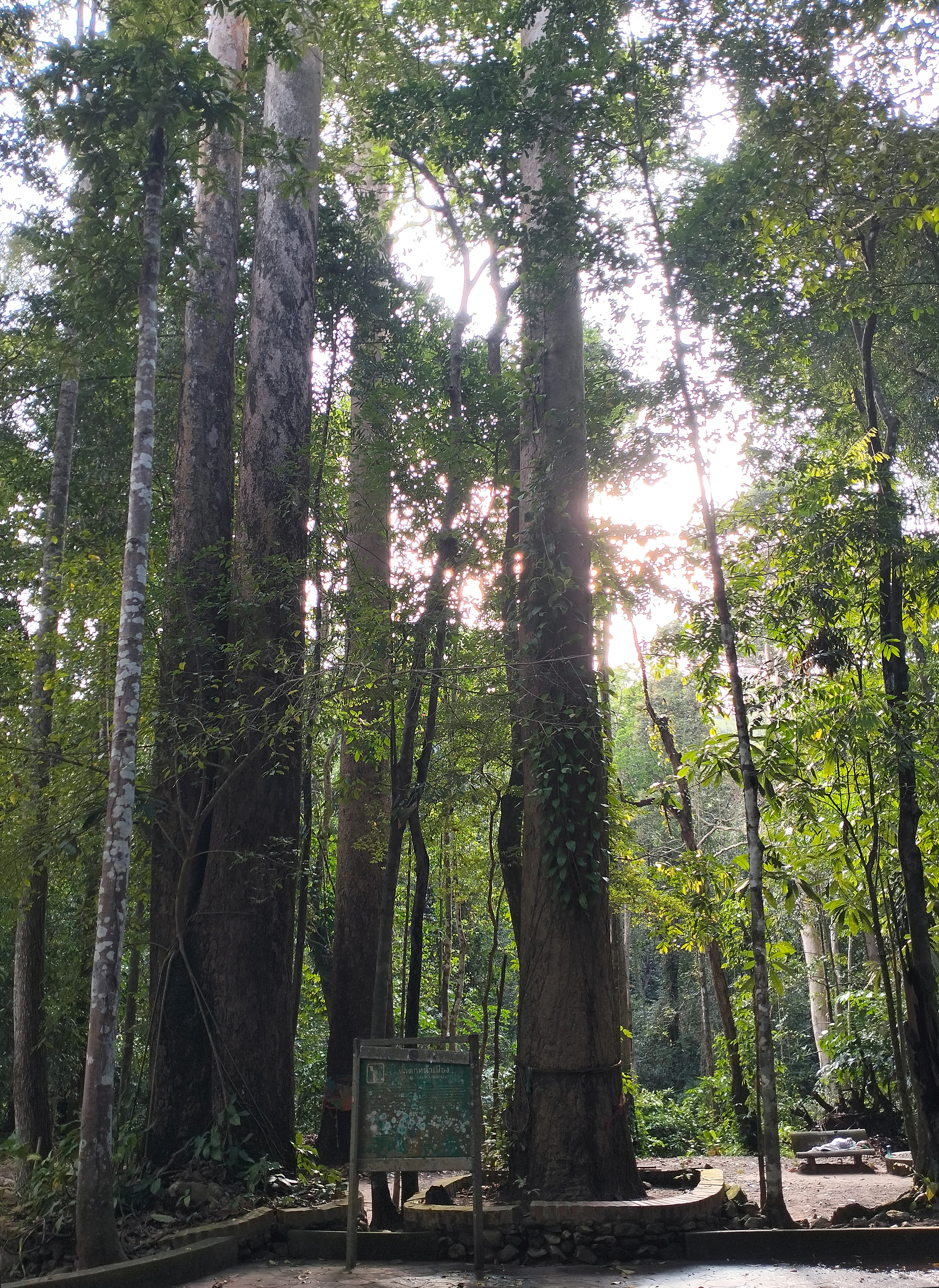
Hopea odorata, Ta-khian trees, by Na Mueang Waterfalls, Koh Samui, Thailand.

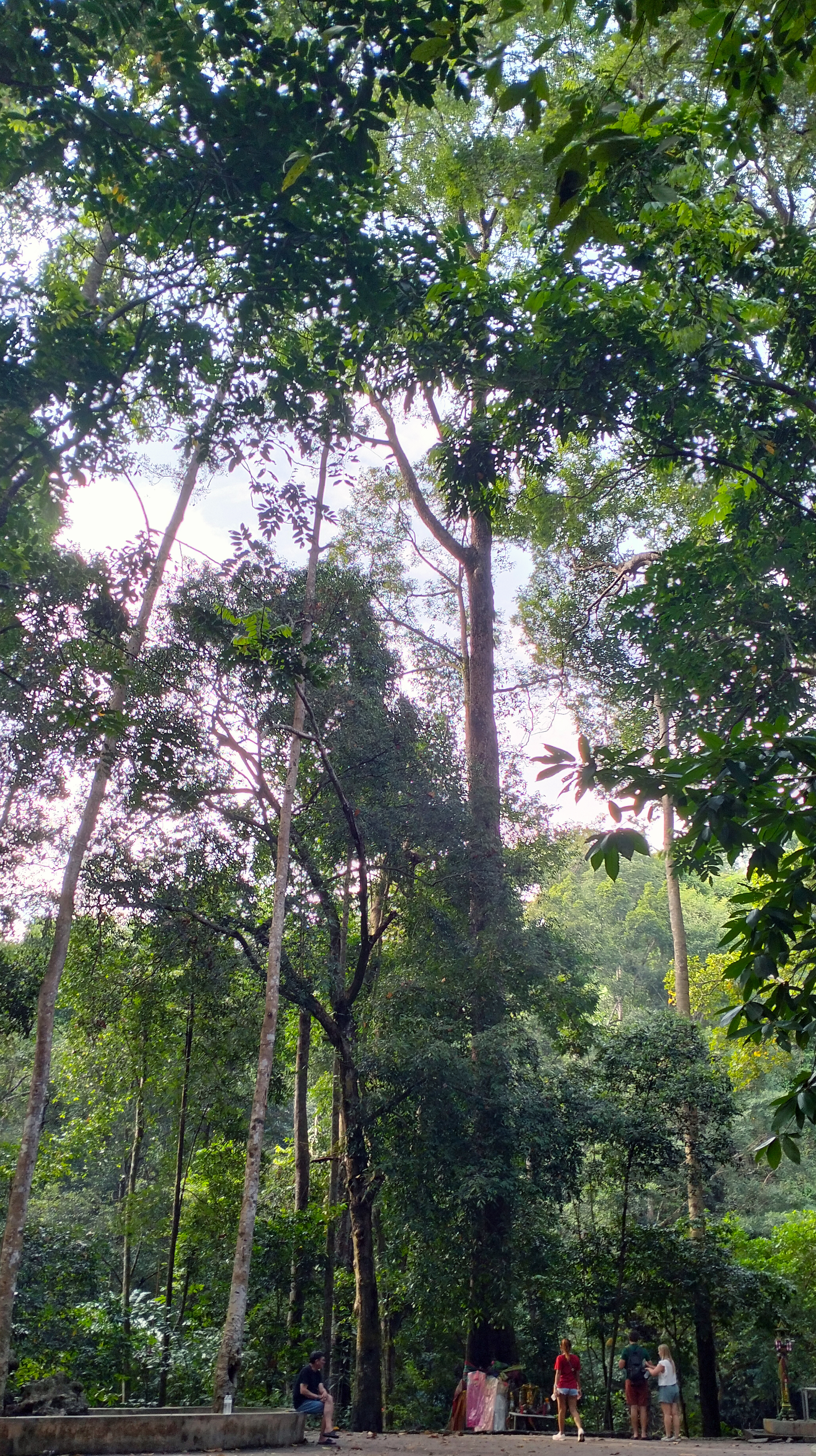
Hopea odorata, Ta-khian trees with a shrine for the spirit Nang Ta-khian, by Na Mueang Waterfalls, Koh Samui, Thailand.
