= Sri Thanonchai =

Sri Thanonchai (Thai: ศรีธนญชัย) is a trickster and antihero from Thai folklore and the subject of a traditional oral epic set during the Ayutthaya Kingdom. Legends describe intellectual rivalry between Sri Thanonchai and others (especially the King of Ayutthaya). Sri Thanonchai is often compared to the German folk character Till Eulenspiegel.

== Plot (synopsis) ==
During the Ayutthaya Period, Thai peasants struggled under draconian laws and authoritarian government. Sri Thanonchai's tricks subvert these systems, most often through word play or interpreting orders too literally. Some tricks are sinister or sadistic in nature. For example, when told to “tie up” his master's cattle, Sri Thanonchai hangs them from a tree. Eventually, the trickster schemes his way into the royal court and remains there until death. His tricks frequently offend the monarch, who several times orders his execution, but always Sri Thanonchai escapes by deceiving the executioners, or proves his innocence in court by demonstrating that he never told an untruth and was only following orders. Despite many outrages, the king always pardons Sri Thanonchai—partly in resignation, because no one can outsmart him, and partly in recognition of his service. Many of Sri Thanonchai's tricks humiliate the enemies of Ayutthaya by turning their pride or greed against them. For example, a Burmese bull tamer challenges Ayutthayans to a bullfight with his unbeatable bovine. Sri Thanonchai meets the challenger with a calf. The bull refuses to fight and leaves the ring, thus forfeiting the match.

The Sri Thanonchai story is divided into episodes that each tell a particular story. The following examples illustrate Sri Thanonchai's diverse methods and motives for trickery.

=== Birth ===
Sri Thanonchai's mother-to-be one night dreams that she brings the moon back to her house. She tells her husband about her dream, and her husband tells the Brahman about the dream. The Brahman says that they will have a bright child. Later the wife gives birth to Sri Thanonchai. He is the only child in the family, but later his mother bears another son. His brother receives a lot of attention from his family, and Sri Thanonchai becomes jealous. Sri Thanonchai's mother asks him to wash his brother. Sri Thanonchai proceeds to "clean" his brother as one cleans meat—by butchering him, cleaning him inside and out. When his parents return home and find their son dead, they banish Sri Thanonchai to live in the Temple.

=== Roofing ===
One day the Monk sees that the Roof of the temple is old and it is falling down so he asks the temple boys to fix the roof. Sri Thanonchai was the only boy who did not help. The other temple boys tell the monk that Sri Thanonchai did not help. Sri Thanonchai is scared that the monk will get mad at him so he reconstructs the roof himself. The other boys fixed the roof by twisting it to the right, so Sri Thanonchai twists the roof to the left. When the monk arrives, Sri Thanonchai asks his friends “which way did you twist the roof?” His friends answer “to the right”. The monk looks up and see that the roof is twisted to the left so he believes that Sri Thanonchai was the one who constructed the roof.

=== King of Ayutthaya ===
The King of Ayutthaya was strolling in the royal gardens with his courtesans and courtiers. As they reached a garden pond, the king, thinking to challenge Sri Thanonchai's wit, taunted him. “You are brainy, Sri Thanonchai. Can you think of a way to make your king go into this pond?” Sri Thanonchai answered. “Your Majesty, I could not persuade you to get into this water. That I could not do. But I could certainly make you come out of the water”. “Let us see” and the king quickly took off his clothes and lowered himself into the pond. Floating in the water, he asked. “Now, Sri Thanonchai. Start talking. How will you make me come out of this water?” Sri Thanonchai laughed. Bowing politely to the king, he said “Dear Majesty. I was not attempting to make you come out of this pond. I was attempting to make you go into the pond. And as you can see, I have succeeded!”. “Sri Thanonchai, you are too clever!” exclaimed the king. He came out of the water graciously, pleased with the wit of Sri Thanonchai.

=== Watermelon seeds ===
The King punishes Sri Thanonchai by sending him to stay on an isolated island. Luckily foreigners visit on a boat. Sri Thanonchai hides on the boat to get a ride to Market. During the ride, he sees the foreigners bring two big watermelons, both cut in half. The foreigners say that they will bring these two watermelons to gambling with the king. Sri Thanonchai knows what is happening, so he hides in the Palace. The next day, the foreigners bring the two watermelons to the king, and ask him to guess how many seeds are in the watermelons. If the king wins the foreigner will give the king everything he has but if the king loses, the king has to give the foreigner the city. At this time the king is thinking of Sri Thanonchai and asks a soldier to go and get him. Suddenly Sri Thanonchai appears and volunteers to guess the number of seeds. He pretends to do complicated calculations but gives the correct number of seeds in the watermelon as he has seen it before. This feat allows him to return and work in the palace.

== Characterization ==
The main character is Sri Thanonchai. He is a trickster who can talk his way out of any situation, and he is good at twisting words and making people believe him. He persistently claims to be innocent and to do exactly what people tell him to do. Although he slacks off from every chore or official duty, he never backs down from a challenge. He embarks on many ventures, such as merchant trading and ordination as a novice monk.

King Jessada plays a large supporting role, alternately praising or punishing Sri Thanonchai. The king is characterized by good humor but a quick temper, a penchant for gambling, and a vengeful streak. Sri Thanonchai's final tricks include making the king crawl on his knees to Sri Thanonchai's deathbed.

Minor characters include Srinuan and Saiyud, Sri Thanonchai's two wives, both won by trickery. Srinuan occasionally assists Sri Thanonchai in his pranks.

The final episodes are occupied by an unnamed character who represents Sri Thanonchai's brother, re-incarnated to exact revenge. The young man outsmarts Sri Thanonchai on three occasions, so that he finally dies of shame—but not before staging a final trick to occur at his funeral.

== Cultural significance ==
Mechai Thongthep writes, “Slavish obedience had particular significance in Ayudhya’s feudal society . . . Little could be more immediately gratifying than literally obeying commands to the detriment of authorities issuing them. Similarly, opportunism and blind greed contributed to many a person’s downfall, particularly when terms of agreement were not clearly specified.” Particularly notable characteristics are “the way he gains ascendancy over people by capitalising on their transparent greed; and his almost pathological determination to triumph in every situation . . . [Sri Thanonchai] personified the supremely alert individual who roguishly turned the tables on would-be vanquishers.”

The Sri Thanonchai epic has over thirty traditional versions, including a nineteenth century verse epic. In modern times, it has been referenced or adapted in numerous comics, novels and films, such as the 2014 comedy film Sri Thanonchai 555+. Sri Thanonchai stories are further featured in temple murals at Wat Phrathum Wanaram in Bangkok.

The traditional epic employs many Thai language aphorisms and puns. It also includes everyday portraits of Thai culture; for example, rules for monks, rituals for proposals and marriages, market life and Thai gambling. It explores the strata of medieval Thai society, including foreigners, peasants, monks, nobility, and the monarchy. As a primarily oral epic, it reflects the ambition of the lower classes to triumph against the higher classes, through ingenuity rather than brute force.

== Other names ==
Sri Thanonchai is a well known character in central Thailand. In the north and northeast (Isan) of Thailand, as well as Laos, the character is called Xiang Miang. He is Saga Dausa in Myanmar and Thanon-Chai or Ah Thonchuy Prach in Cambodia.
