= Nang Tani =

Ghost in Thai folklore

Nang Tani นางตานี
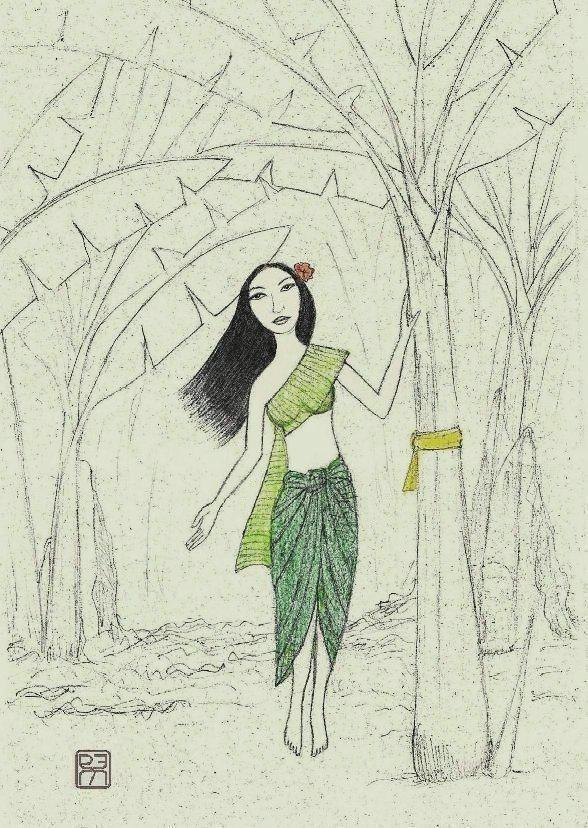
- Nang Tani female ghost

Creature information
- Other name(s): Phi Tani, Tani
- Grouping: Legendary creature Tutelary deity
- Sub grouping: Nocturnal, undead
- Similar entities: Nang Ta-khian; Bashōnosei
- Folklore: Southeast Asian folk mythology

Origin
- Country: Thailand, Laos, Cambodia
- Region: Southeast Asia
- Habitat: Banana tree clumps

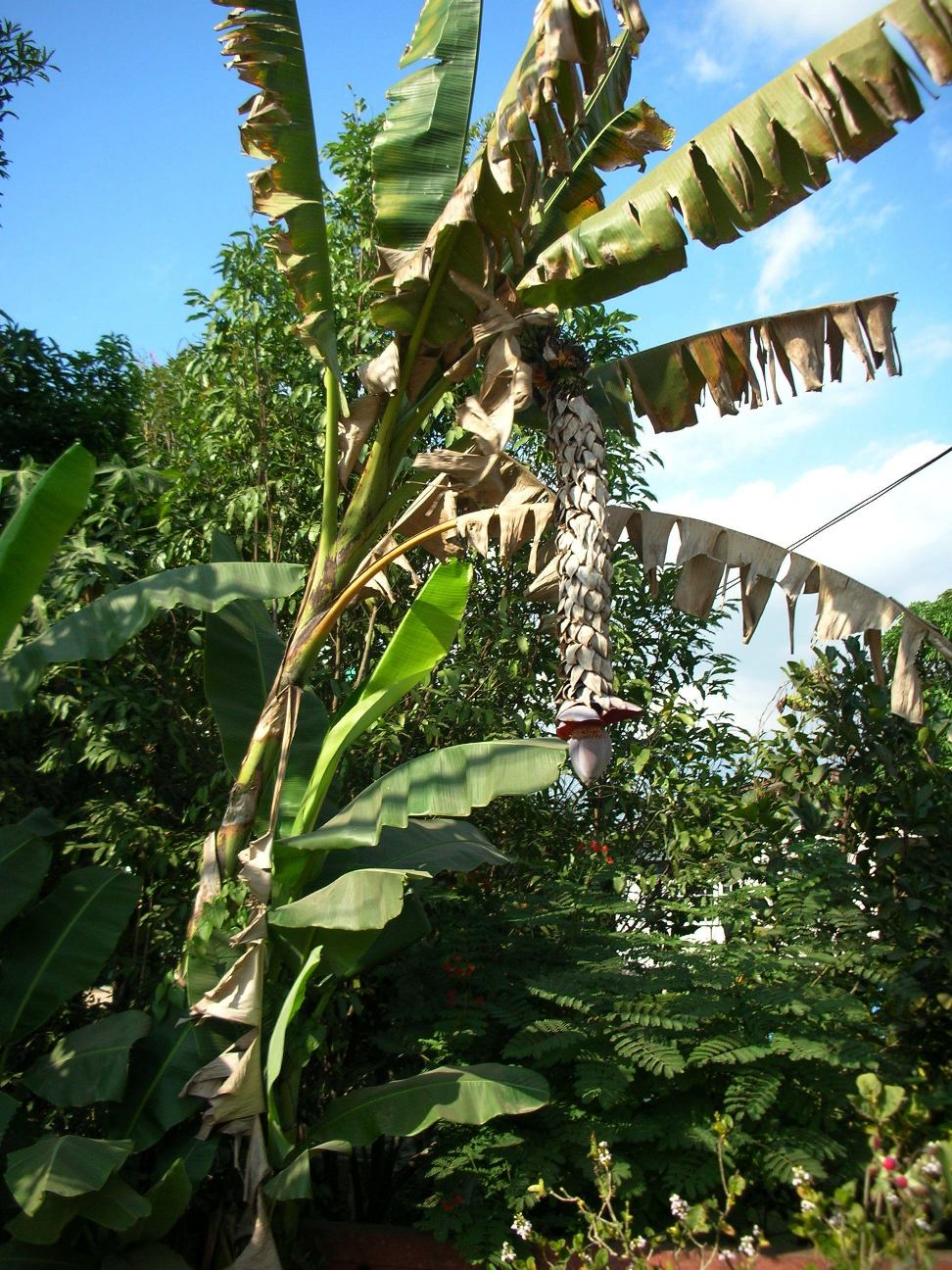
The wild type of banana known in Thai language as Kluai Tani (กล้วยตานี)

Nang Tani (Thai: นางตานี; "Lady of Tani") is a female spirit of the Thai folklore. According to folk tradition, this ghost appears as a young woman that haunts wild banana trees (Musa acuminata), known in Thai language as Kluai Tani (กล้วยตานี).

Nang Tani belongs to a type of female ghosts or fairies related to trees known generically as Nang Mai (นางไม้; "Lady of the Wood") in the Thai lore. There is a similar spirit in the Cambodian folklore, as well as in the Lao popular tradition.

Nang Tani may also be called Phi Tani (ผีตานี; "Ghost of Tani") or Phrai Tani (พรายตานี; "Nymph of Tani").

== Legends ==
This ghost inhabits the clumps of wild banana trees and is popularly represented as a beautiful young woman wearing a green traditional Thai costume. Most of the time Phi Tani remains hidden, but she comes out of the tree and becomes visible especially on full moon nights. She has a greenish complexion, blending with the tree, but her lips have the red color of the ripe ivy gourd. Her hair is black, abundant and untied. She generally appears in a standing position and her feet don't touch the ground, but hover slightly above it. In some modern representations the lower part of her body is represented with an immaterial quality, her waist cloth ending in a kind of wisp emanating from the tree trunk.

It is considered a bad omen to cut trees from the clump Tani inhabits. Offerings are made to her in the form of sweets, incense sticks and flowers. People also often tie a length of colored satin cloth around the trunk of the banana tree believed to be haunted by her. The Kluai Tani type of banana tree does not belong to the cultivated varieties. Owing to their connection with ghosts, people prefer not to have them growing near their homes and they are not found within village compounds. However, clumps of this tree are found not far from inhabited areas, often at the outskirts of villages or at the edge of cultivated fields by the roadside. They look very much like average banana trees, but their fruits are not edible. Their leaves are commonly used in Thailand to wrap locally produced sweets and the inflorescence for the treatment of ulcers in traditional medicine.

Legends of the Thai oral tradition say that this spirit may harm men, especially those who have wronged women, but she is mostly considered benevolent. Nang Tani generally has a gentle disposition and may give food to passing Buddhist monks. Amulets featuring Nang Tani are popular and come in a variety of shapes and sizes. Some people tie lengths of colored silk around the trunks of the banana trees reputed to be haunted by Nang Tani.

== Modern adaptations ==
Nang Tani is a popular folk spirit that has been featured in some Thai films such as Nang Phrai Tani (นางพรายตานี), a film made in 1967 that has become a classic. Nang Tani (นางตานี), Tani Thi Rak (ตานีที่รัก), Mon Rak Nang Phrai Patha Nang Tani (มนต์รักนางพรายปะทะนางตานี) and 2000 film Phrai Tani (พรายตานี), are less important movies in which the banana tree ghost plays the main role. She also plays a role in other films such as horror movie Nang Phrai Khanong Rak (นางพรายคะนองรัก), among others. Tani appeared as well in a Sylvania light bulb commercial for Thai audiences.

This female ghost is much loved in Thai popular culture, representations and stories about her, sometimes humorous, are common in Thai comic books and story books. Tani has a role as well in the Nak animated movie.

== Similar ghosts ==
- Bashōnosei: Japanese ghostly banana trees (Musa basjoo), they usually appear as a human face amongst the broad, flat banana leaves. If any woman sees a handsome man underneath bashōnosei, it means she is about to become pregnant and later will give birth to children who will be demons. This legend originates from the Ryukyu Islands.

== See also ==
- Ghost Banana Tree
- Ghosts in Thai culture
- List of tree deities
- Phraya Anuman Rajadhon
