= Nang Ta-khian =

Spirit from Thai folklore

Nang Ta-khian นางตะเคียน
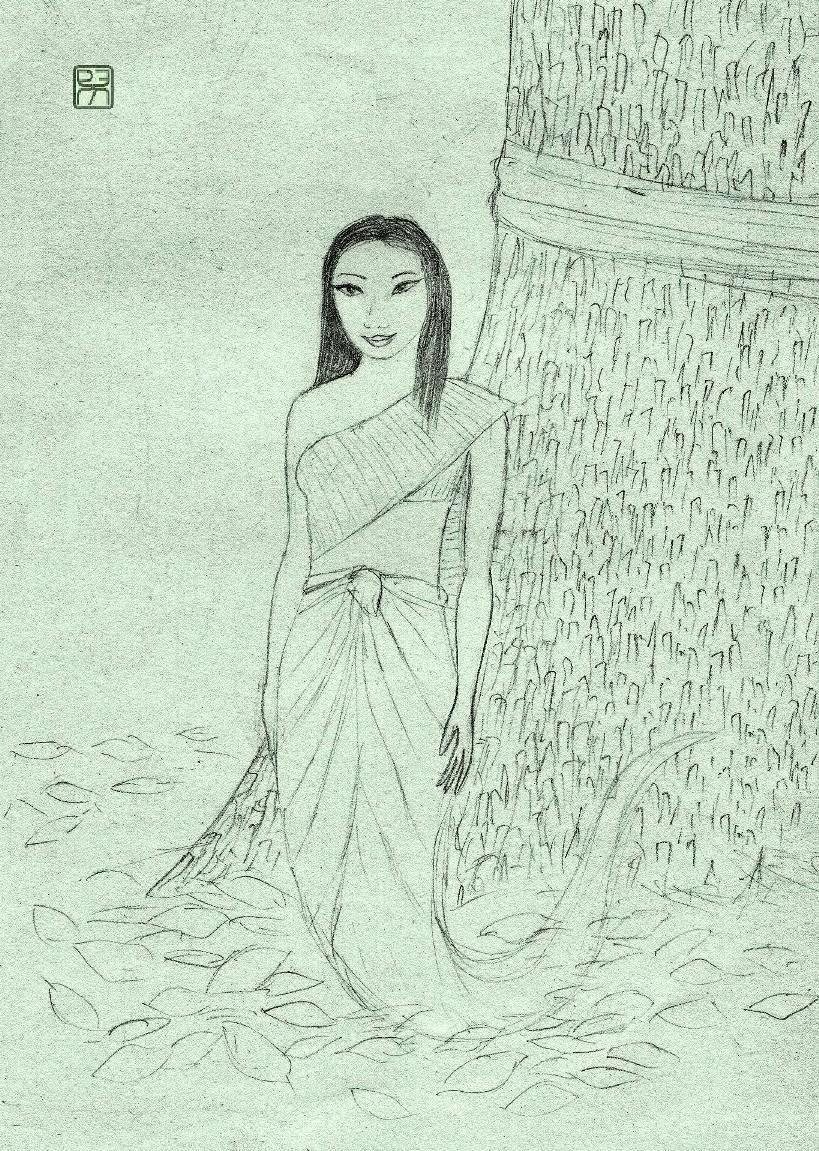
- Nang Ta-khian female ghost

Creature information
- Grouping: Legendary creature Tutelary deity
- Sub grouping: Sylvan, undead, tree worship
- Similar entities: Nang Tani
- Folklore: Thai folk mythology

Origin
- Country: Thailand
- Region: Southeast Asia
- Habitat: Hopea odorata trees, logs and wooden beams

Nang Ta-khian (Thai: นางตะเคียน, "Lady of Ta-khian") is a female spirit of the folklore of Thailand. It manifests itself as a woman that haunts Hopea odorata trees. These are very large trees known as Ta-khian (ตะเคียน) in Thai, hence her name.

== Legends ==
The Nang Ta-khian belong to a type of spirits or fairies related to trees and known generically in Thai folklore as Nang Mai (นางไม้, "Lady of the Tree"). Legends in the Thai oral tradition say the spirit inhabits a Ta-khian tree and sometimes appears as a beautiful young woman wearing traditional Thai attire, usually in reddish or brownish colours, contrasting with Nang Tani who is mostly represented in a green dress.

Nang Ta-khian is generally a sylvan spirit, for the Ta-khian is a tall, massive tree that can live for centuries, naturally found in the forest and not near inhabited areas. As it has a large trunk and a wide-spreading root system, it is normally not planted close to homesteads. Like all Nang Mai, Nang Ta-khian haunts the immediate environment of her tree and she may also haunt a house having beams, stilts or pillars made from Ta-khian wood. She may hurt wicked or immoral people that come close to her abode, but righteous persons have nothing to fear from her.

The tree is almost never felled for lumber, since the spirit will be furious and follow the wood. About the only place Ta-khian is used as lumber is in a Buddhist monastery, where the merit of the monks is considered sufficient to render the spirit harmless. Traditionally trees where Ta-khian resides have lengths of colored satin cloth wrapped around their trunk. In order to protect venerable old trees from logging, Buddhist monks use to wrap lengths of satin around them and in case of having to cut the tree a special ceremony had to be performed to ask for permission. However, in present times some of these very ancient trees are felled anyway for their wood, even though it is said to be dangerous for a person to cut such a tree without the previous consent of the spirit inhabiting it.

== Temples and shrines ==
In some parts of Thailand, Nang Ta-khian has become a popular tree deity. Miracles are attributed to her power and not only living trees, but also logs, beams or keels of wooden boats where the spirit is deemed to reside are an object of pilgrimage and have lengths of colored silk tied as an offering. In present times, Nang Ta-Khian is usually propitiated in order to be lucky in the lottery.

Most Nang Ta-khian shrines are quite humble, but larger temples and shrines dedicated to Nang Ta-Khian are found in locations such as Sao Hai District, Saraburi Province and Amphawa District, Samut Songkhram Province, the shrine being part of a larger temple compound in some places.

== Offerings and shrines ==
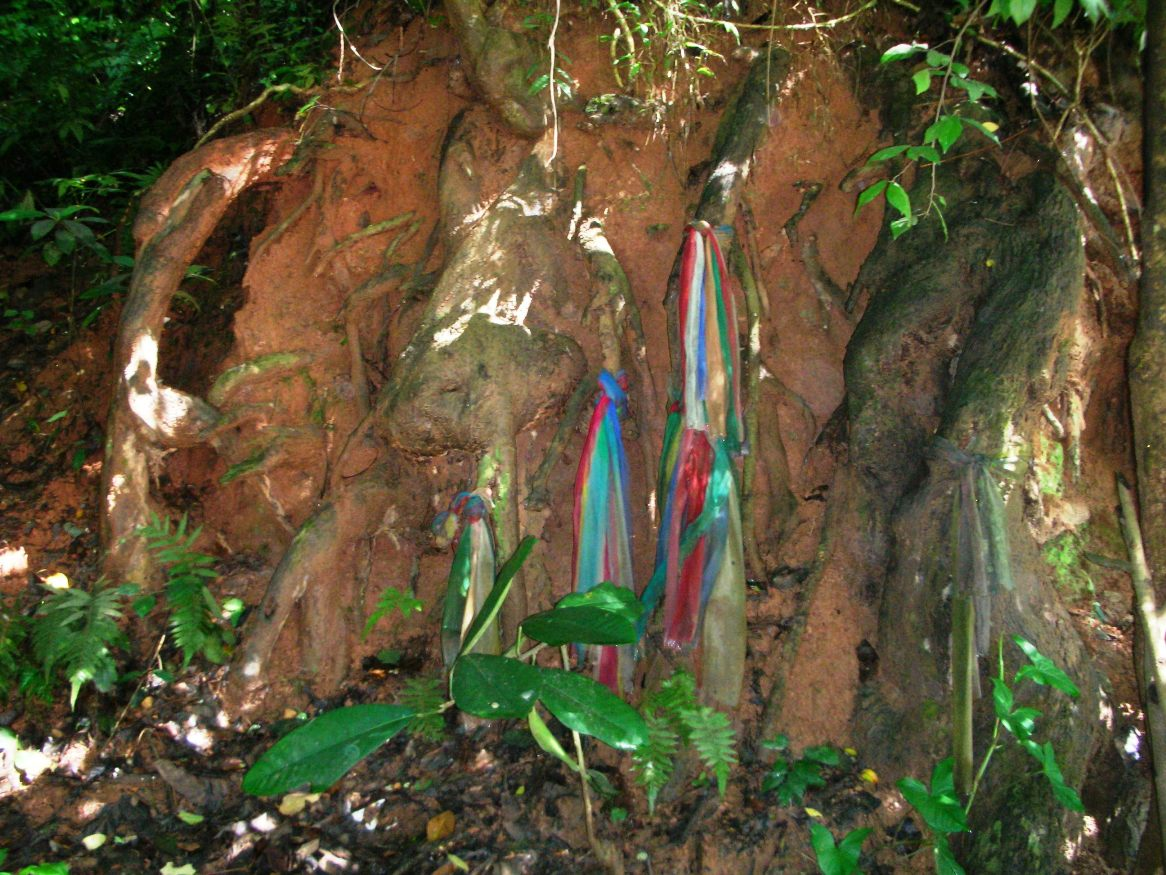
Offerings to Nang Ta-khian: Lengths of brocade tied around the exposed roots of a Hopea odorata tree (ตะเคียน) growing on a steep slope.

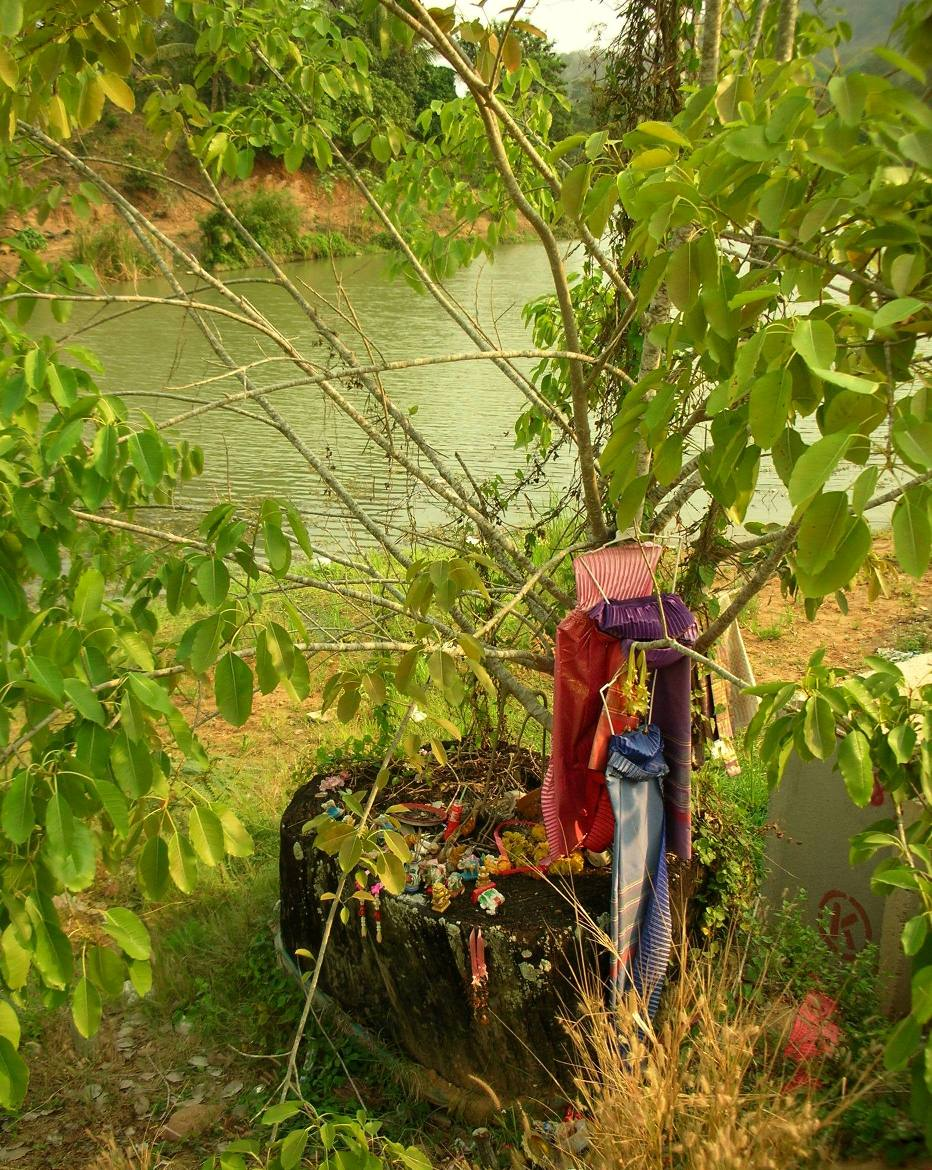
Stump of a Hopea odorata tree (ตะเคียน) with offerings near the Nang Ta-khian shrine close to the lake at Dan Sing Khon.

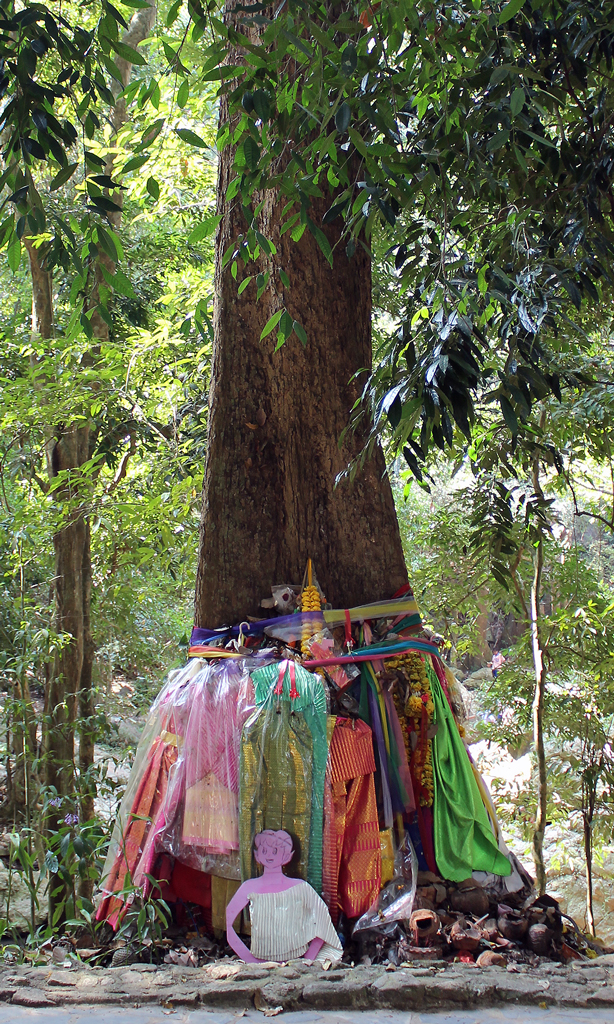
Ta-khian offer by Na Mueang 1 Waterfall on Koh Samui.

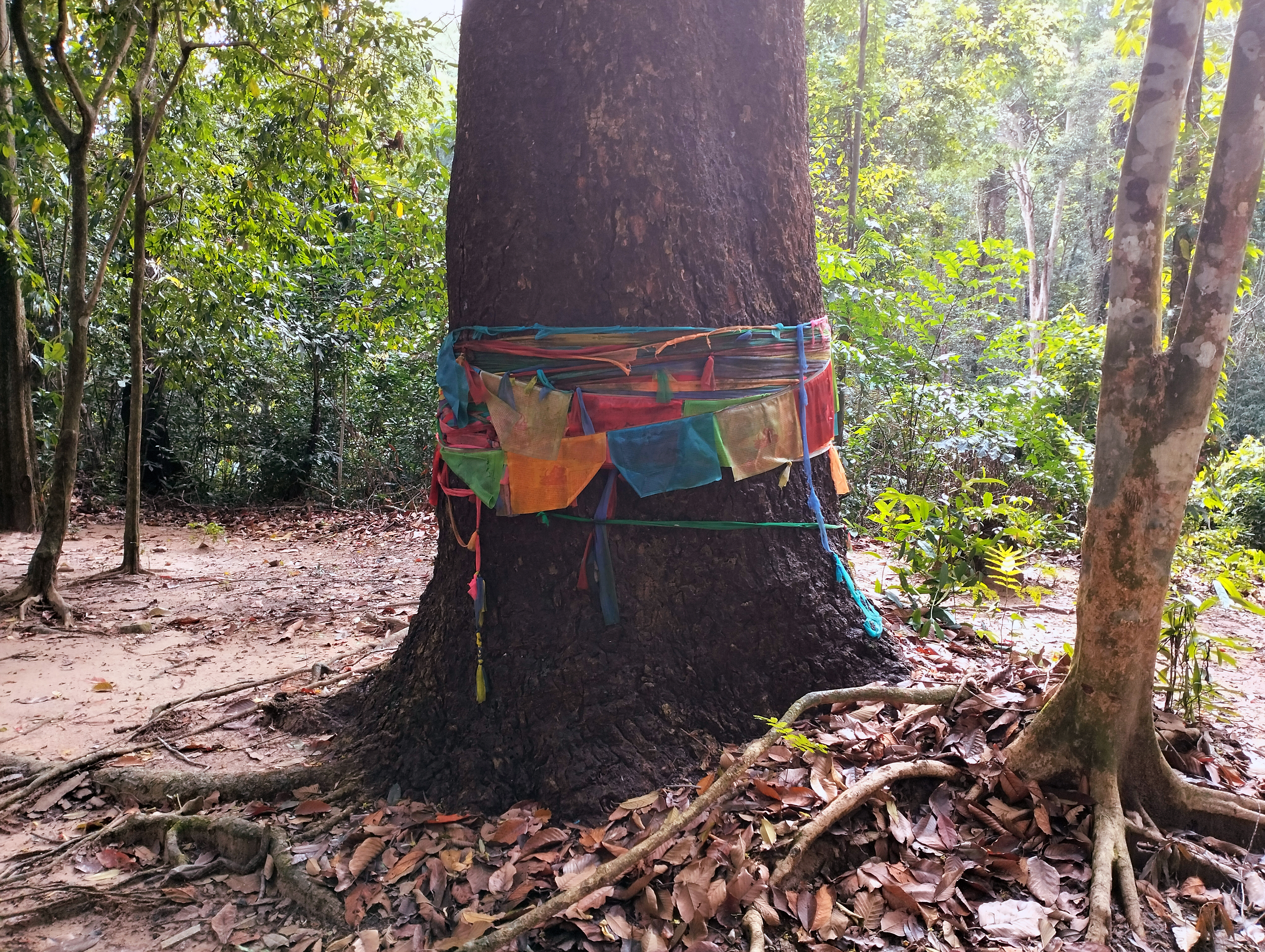
Ta khian tree with satin cloth by Na Mueang 1 Waterfall on Koh Samui.

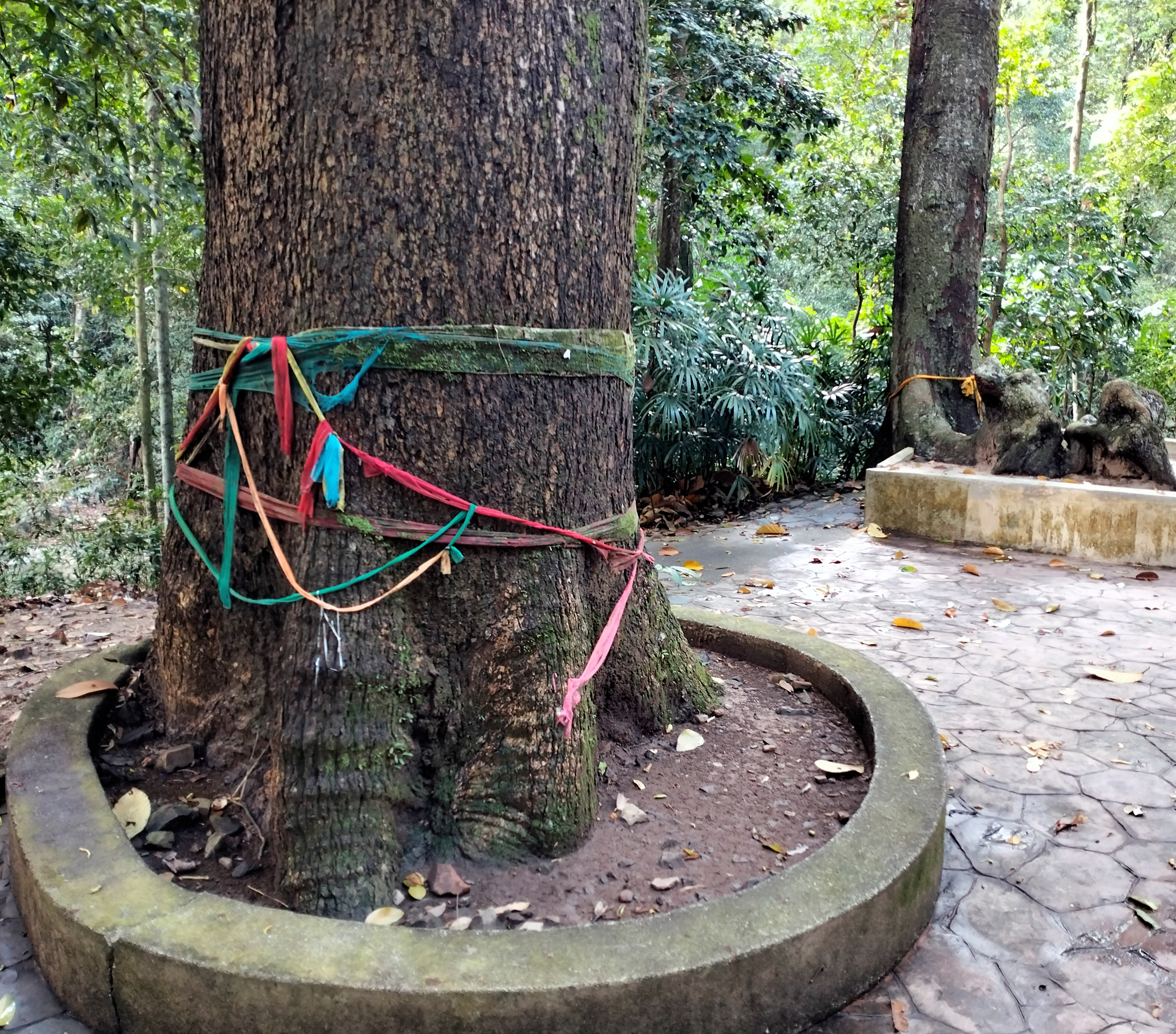
Ta khian trees with satin cloth by Na Mueang 1 Waterfall on Koh Samui.

== Modern adaptations ==
This folk spirit is featured in the 2003 Thai film Ta-khian ("The Haunted Tree"), with Sorapong Chatree, 2010 movie Nang Ta-khian ("Takien: The Haunted Tree") and 2025 Channel 8 lakhon "Love Across Lifetimes" (พิศวาสข้ามภพ). Nang Ta-khian has a role as well in the Nak animated movie.

== See also ==
- Dryad
- Ghosts in Thai culture
- Phraya Anuman Rajadhon
- List of tree deities
- Wish Tree
