= Krahang =

Spirit in Thai folklore

Krahang กระหัง
Creature information
- Grouping: Legendary creature
- Sub grouping: Nocturnal, undead
- Similar entities: Owlman; Orang-bati; Ahool; Krasue
- Folklore: Southeast Asian folk mythology

Origin
- Country: Thailand
- Region: Southeast Asia
- Habitat: Dark rural areas

Krahang (Thai: กระหัง, pronounced [krā.hǎŋ]; or กระหาง, [krā.hǎːŋ]) is a male spirit of the Thai folklore. It manifests itself as a shirtless man, wearing a traditional loincloth, who flies in the night.

Krahang uses two large kradong (กระด้ง), round rice winnowing baskets, to fly in the night in rural areas of Thailand. It also often rides a sak tam khao (สากตำข้าว), the long wooden pestle of a traditional manual rice pounder.

== Legends & sightings ==
Krahang is a type of nocturnal ghost that is said to haunt the same areas as Krasue, a female spirit of the Thai village folklore, thus these two spirits are often mentioned or represented together. Legends of the Thai oral tradition say that this is an evil spirit that may harm people walking at night in out of the way areas. Like Krasue it lives the life of a normal villager during the day.

However, according to research in the "Three Seals Law" (กฎหมายตราสามดวง) from the Ayutthaya period, Rungroj Piromanukul, an anthropologist at Ramkhamhaeng University, found that Krahang does not appear in the list of ghosts. He believes that the name was recorded later.

In August 2012 villagers from Lat Bua Khao, Sikhio District, in the western part of Nakhon Ratchasima Province, blamed Krahang for some attacks on local women at night. Ultimately, the culprit was found to be a person addicted to drugs.

In July 2017, an 18-year-old girl from Nong Plong, Chamni District, Buriram Province, claimed that while she was in the restroom of her house at night, just before closing her eyes, she saw a Krahang through a gap near the ceiling. It appeared as a large man with wings sprouting from his back. Panicked, she ran out of the restroom. When the story spread, it caused widespread fear among residents of two neighbouring villages.

An elderly woman in the village claimed that she had been seeing the Krahang for over ten years. According to her, the creature often flies in pairs with glowing eyes like thunderbolts. She said she last saw it at 2:00 a.m. one Sunday early in the year and watched it for about half an hour. She even tried to get her son to record it with his phone, but was unsuccessful.

The woman believed that the Krahang originated from an abandoned house nearby, which once belonged to her family. In 2010, her mother and older sister both died in that house just three months apart. Since then, she claimed to have seen strange lights floating out of the house at night—phenomena she believed were manifestations of both Krasue and Krahang. She said she had been fighting the Krahang in her dreams for over ten years before finally seeing it in real life in early 2012. In an attempt to stop it, she hired a sorcerer to perform exorcisms at the house, spending over 100,000 baht, but to no avail.

== Modern adaptations ==
Krahang is a popular folk spirit that has been featured in the 1991 Thai film Kahang (กะหัง) and film Krahang (กระหัง), and was adapted as a funny character in Thep Sarm Rudoo (เทพสามฤดู) a folk-style television series that was made in 1987, 2003 and 2017, as well as in a Sylvania light bulb commercial for Thai audiences.

Representations of Krahang, mostly humorous, are very common in Thai comic books. A benevolent Krahang has a role as well in the Nak animated movie.

== See also ==
- Krasue
- Owlman
- Phraya Anuman Rajadhon
