= Phraya Anuman Rajadhon =

Thai anthropologist

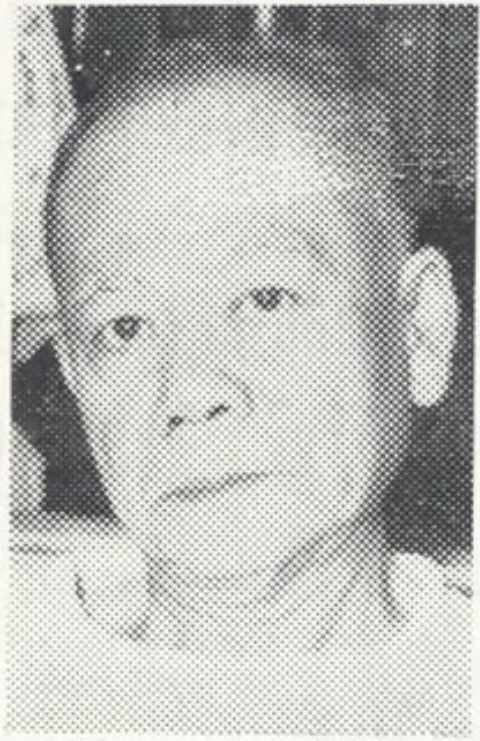
- Born: Yong Sathirakoses; December 14, 1888; Bangkok, Siam
- Died: July 12, 1969 (aged 80); Bangkok, Thailand
- Occupations: Linguist; anthropologist; ethnographer
- Writing career
- Pen name: Sathirakoses (เสฐียรโกเศศ)
- Subject: Thai folklore studies
- Notable work: Literary translation of The Pilgrim Kamanita

Phraya Anuman Rajadhon (Thai: พระยาอนุมานราชธน; RTGS: Phraya Anuman Ratchathon, also spelled Phaya Anuman Rajadhon or Phrayā Anuman Rajadhon; December 14, 1888 – July 12, 1969), was one of modern Thailand's most remarkable scholars. He was a self-trained linguist, anthropologist and ethnographer who became an authority on the culture of Thailand. His name was Yong Sathirakoses (Thai: ยง เสฐียรโกเศศ, RTGS: Sathiankoset); Phraya Anuman Rajadhon was his noble title. He also took his family name, Sathirakoses, as a pen name by which he is well known.

His prolific work and his interest in a multitude of culture-related fields, from folklore to sociology, set the foundations for a long-lasting cultural awareness among young Thai scholars.

Phraya Anuman Rajadhon was the first Thai scholar to conduct a serious study of Thai folkloristics, taking notes on the nocturnal village spirits of Thai folklore. He established that since such spirits were not represented in paintings or drawings, they were purely based on popular traditional oral stories. Thus most of the contemporary iconography of ghosts such as Nang Tani, Nang Ta-khian, Krasue, Krahang, Phi Am, Phi Hua Kat, Phi Pop, Phi Phong, Phi Phraya, Phi Tai Hong and Mae Nak Phra Khanong has its origins in Thai films that have become classics.

== Biography ==
At a young age, Phya Anuman Rajadhon observed and took notes on Thai society at a crucial time when much of the traditional culture was being overwhelmed by modernity. As years went by he studied in depth the language, popular customs, oral tradition, social norms and the value system of the Thai people.

He worked in different locations, including the Oriental Hotel in Bangkok, during his youth and middle age. In the years when Phya Anuman Rajadhon worked as a clerk at the Thai Customs Department, he befriended a Mr. Norman Mackay, who helped him to polish his broken English.

He had no academic titles and did all the training he needed for his research and compilation work on his own. Phya Anuman Rajadhon took a special interest in popular culture. Many of the ancient habits of Thais that he recorded and described would have died unnoticed if they had not been put down into writing by him. Often his descriptions were accompanied by illustrations.

As a writer he wrote novels under the pen name Sathirakoses. He also wrote works on important Thai cultural figures, including a biography of Phra Saraprasoet '(Trī Nākhaprathīp)' (1889–1945), a likewise dedicated author and commentator in the field of Thai literature. He knew Phra Saraprasoet well, as they worked together as co-translators of many works. One particular work which he co-translated into Thai with Phra Saraprasoet was "The Pilgrim Kamanita", a novel by Danish Nobel laureate Karl Adolph Gjellerup about a young Indian merchant's seek for truth and his encounter with Lord Buddha. The translation was admired for its beautiful Thai prose and was selected as one of the textbooks for the Thai secondary school curriculum.

Recognition came to Phya Anuman Rajadhon only towards his later years, when he was invited to universities to give lectures and began travelling abroad. He was given the post of President of the Siam Society and ended up becoming one of Thailand's most respected intellectuals, both in the last years of his life and posthumously.

The commemoration of the 100th year of his birth was staged in 1988 by UNESCO, where social activist Sulak Sivaraksa, founder of the Sathirakoses-Nagapradeepa Foundation, described Phya Anuman Rajadhon as a National Hero.

== Selected works ==
Only a fraction of Phya Anuman Rajadhon's works has been translated into English.

- Essays on Thai Folklore, Editions Duang Kamol, ISBN 974-210-345-3
- Popular Buddhism in Siam and other Essays on Thai Studies, Thai Inter-religious Commission on Development and Sathirakoses-Nagapradipa Foundation, Bangkok 1986
- Thet Maha Chat, Promotion and Public Relations Sub-Division, Fine Arts Department, Bangkok 1990
- Life and Ritual in Old Siam: Three Studies of Thai Life and Customs, New Haven, HRAF Press, 1961
- Five papers on Thai custom, Southeast Asia Program, Dept. of Far Eastern Studies, Cornell University, Ithaca, NY, 1958
- Some traditions of the Thai and other translations of Phya Anuman Rajadhon's articles on Thai customs, Thai Inter-Religious Commission for Development & Sathirakoses-Nagapradipa Foundation, Suksit Siam, Bangkok 1987
- The Nature and Development of the Thai language, Thai Culture, New series; no. 10, Thailand; Fine Arts Dept., Bangkok 1961
- Thai Literature in Relation to the Diffusion of Her Cultures, Thailand Culture New Series; no. 9, Thailand; Fine Arts Dept., Bangkok 1969
- Thai Language, National Culture Institute, Bangkok 1954
- Chao Thi and some traditions of Thai, National Culture Institute, Bangkok 1956
- "Phra Cedi", Journal of the Siam Society, Bangkok, 1952
- Thai Literature and Swasdi Raksa, Thailand Culture Series; no. 3, National Culture Institute, Bangkok 1956
- Introducing Cultural Thailand in Outline, Thailand Culture Series; no. 1, Thailand; Fine Arts Dept., Bangkok 2006, ISBN 974-417-810-8
- "The Story of Thai Marriage Custom", Thailand Culture Series, no. 13, National Culture Institute, Bangkok, 1954.
- Loy Krathong and Songkran Festivals, The National Culture Institute, Bangkok 1953

== Journal articles ==
Journal of the Siam Society (JSS)

- JSS Vol. 38.2c (1951). "The Loi Krathong"
- JSS Vol.40.1d (1952) "Phra Cedi"
- JSS Vol. 40.2f (1952). "The Ceremony of Tham Khwan of a Month Old Child"
- JSS Vol. 41.2c (1954). "The Phi"
- JSS Vol. 42.1d (1954). "The Water Throwing"
- JSS Vol. 42.1e (1954). "Bathing ceremony"
- JSS Vol.42.1f (1954). "Amusements during Songkran festival"
- JSS Vol. 42.2b (1955). "The end of Buddhist Lent"
- JSS Vol. 43.1e (1955). "A Note on Divination By Ahom Deodhais"
- JSS Vol. 43.1f (1955). "Me Posop, the Rice Mother"
- JSS Vol. 45.2e (1957). "The Golden Meru"
- JSS Vol. 48.2c (1960). "Fertility Rites in Thailand"
- JSS Vol. 49.1e (1961). "Some Siamese Superstitions About Trees and Plants"
- JSS Vol. 49.2f' (1961). "Thai Traditional Salutation"
- JSS Vol. 50.2d (1962). "The Khwan and its Ceremonies"
- JSS Vol. 52.2d (1964). "Thai Charms and Amulets"
- JSS Vol. 53.1h (1965). "Data on Conditioned Poison"
- JSS Vol. 53.2b (1965). "A Study on Thai Folk Tale"
- JSS Vol. 55.2b (1967). "Notes on the Thread-Square in Thailand"
- JSS Vol. 58.1i (1970). "Obituary Phy Anuman Rajadhon"
- JSS Vol. 76.0v (1988). "Phya Anuman Rajadhon (Obituary by Somchai Anuman Rajadhon)"

== See also ==
- Culture of Thailand
- Ghosts in Thai culture
- Vessantara Jataka
- Journal of the Siam Society
