= Nariphon =

Buddhist mythology

Nariphon นารีผล
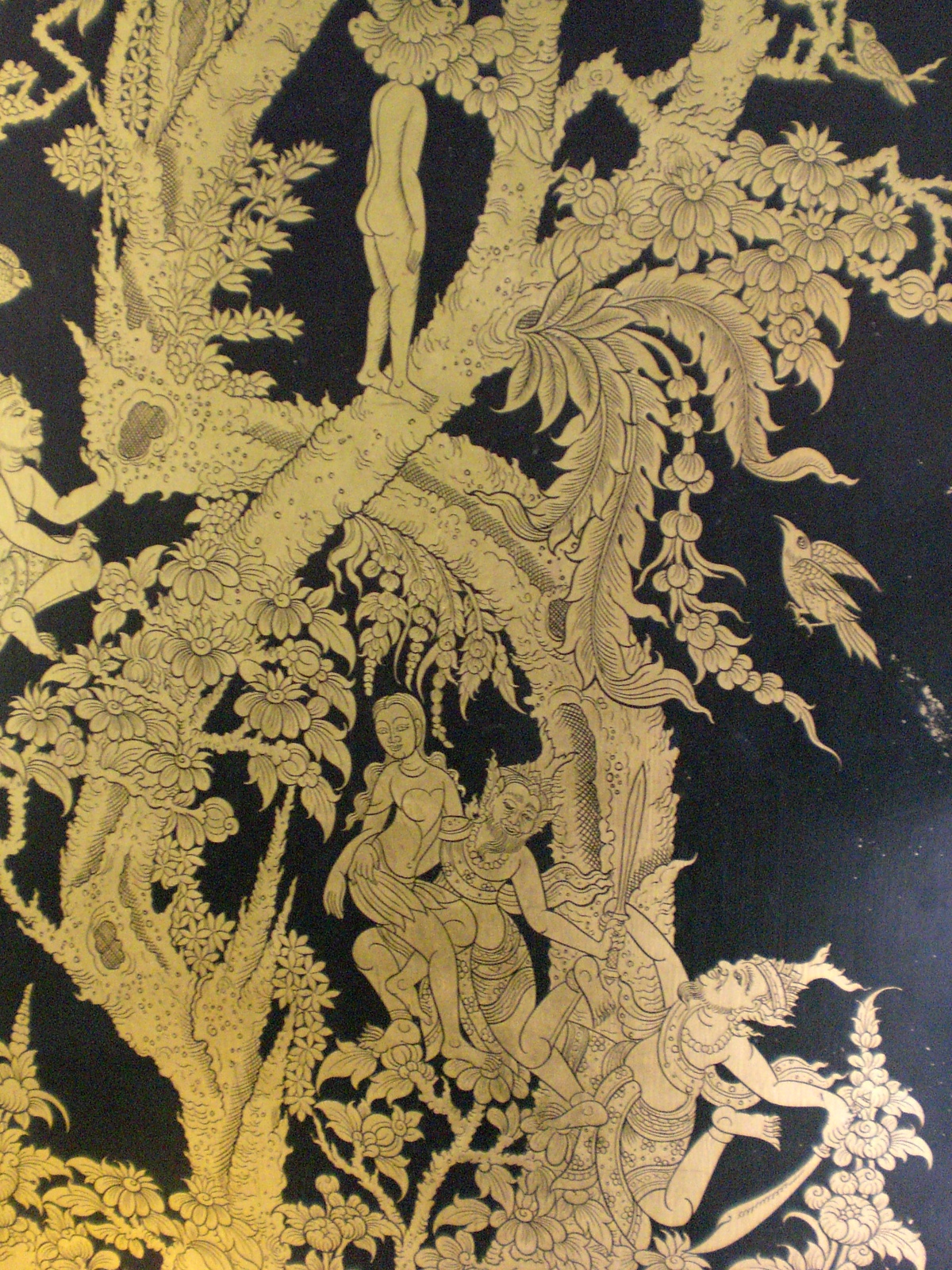
- Thai lacquerwork painting of the Naripon tree at Phra Pathom Chedi

Creature information
- Grouping: Mythical tree Legendary creatures
- Sub grouping: Sylvan
- Folklore: Buddhist mythology Thai folk mythology

Origin
- Country: India, Thailand
- Region: Southeast Asia

The Nariphon (Thai: นารีผล, from Pali nārīphala), also known as Makkaliphon (Thai: มักกะลีผล, from Pali makkaliphala), is a tree in Buddhist mythology which bears fruit in the shape of young female creatures. The maidens grow attached by their head from the tree branches. This tree grows at the Himaphan, a mythical forest where the female fruits are enjoyed by the Gandharvas who cut the fruits and take them away.

The Nariphon is also mentioned in the Vessantara Jātaka in which Indra placed these trees around the grove where the Bodhisattva Vessantara meditated.

== Myths and folklore ==
According to Buddhist mythology, the god Indra created a pavilion (Sala) as an abode for Vessantara, his wife, and two children to live. His wife went into the forest to collect fruits: she was, however, in danger of being attacked by hermits or yogis who lived in the forest. Although they had acquired special powers from their meditation, they had not conquered lust.

Therefore, Indra created twelve of these special Nariphon trees. The trees would bear fruit whenever she went out to collect food and distract the men. The fruits were all in the image of Indra's beautiful wife. The men took the fruits to their place of abode and, after making love to them, would sleep for four months and lose their powers.

According to Thai folklore, since Vessantara and his family have died, the trees bear fruit daily, but the forest will disappear when the Buddha's teachings have become lost (predicted to be five thousand years after his death). When the fruits appear on the trees, they last for seven days, after which they will wither and die if they are not picked. They have same internal organs as humans, but no bones. These maidens also have magical powers and possess spirits which can sing and dance.

There are supposedly two Makaliporn pods in a Buddhist temple near Bangkok. It is said that they came from Himaphan, the mythical forest. At Wat Pheut Udom temple near Pathum Thani there is a representation of the tree together with ghosts and hell-scenes.

Folk stories claim that the tree grows somewhere in the Phetchabun Mountains and hoaxes are common; these include pictures of Nariphon girls growing from trees as well as dry Nariphon maidens.

The Nariphon myth inspired the 2006 Thai film Nariphon (นารีผล, "Devil Ivy"), with Chayanan Arjpru, Tassachol Pongpakawat and Paymanee Sangkakorn, and 2010 movie Nariphon Khon Phrueksa (นารีผล คนพฤกษา, "Nariphon, People from the Tree"), with Phasakon Phomrabut and Thanmon Theklamlong.

Nariphon trees are known as Thuyaung trees in Myanmar and Nari-Lata-Vela in Sri Lanka. Nariphon also appears in the Lao epic Sang Sinxay.

== See also ==
- Sang Sinxay
- Tree spirits
- Vessantara Jataka
- Wāḳwāḳ
