= Nang mai =

Figure in Thai folklore

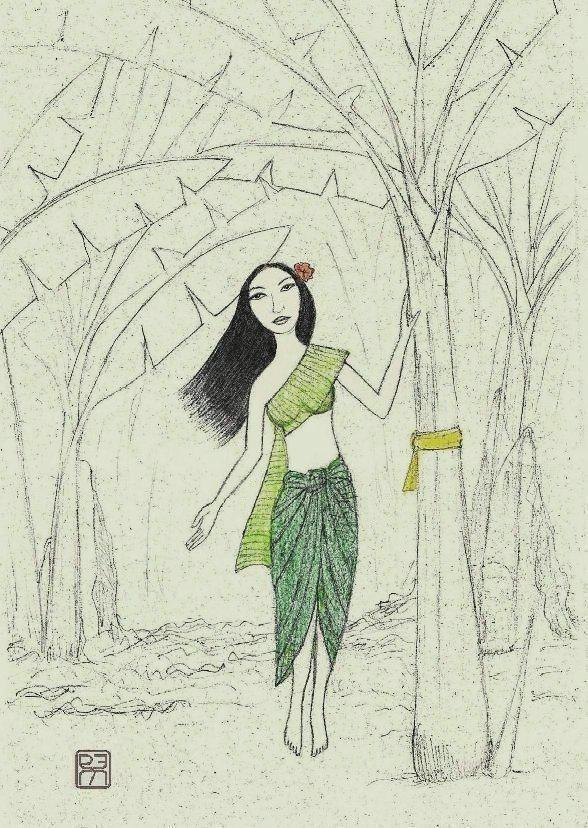

Nang Mai (Thai: นางไม้) is a ghost from Thai folklore that inhabits a large tree. It builds a palace in the tree, but nobody can see it, and if anyone cuts that tree, the cutter will be cursed, grow sick, or even become crazy.

== Description ==
Nang mai in Thai folklore, is said to be a young woman wearing a pleated robe and covering herself in a sash with shoulder-length hair. Nang mai can also be a male, and they would be called Rukkhadeva (Thai: รุกขเทวดา)., who would mostly inhabit a banyan tree or in a large tree, but Nang mai would mostly live in a smaller size tree. If someone in a village saw Nang mai inhabiting a tree, they would bring a 3-colour cloth to tie up the tree.

In Thailand people believe there is a good Nang mai who will warn their owner, who takes good care of them, of any upcoming danger, and an evil Nang mai who will lure men to make them their husband or to just kill them. Nang Tani and Nang Ta-khian are also considered a Nang mai but the spirit of a person who kills themselves and their spirit is stuck with that tree is not considered a Nang mai.

The Nang Ta-khian version of Nang mai or Nang mai who inhabits a large tree is considered to be one of the most hostile Nang mai because they believe that the larger the tree, the older and more haunting it is. Some people also say that the more sap the tree produces, the more haunting the Nang mai who live in it are.

== Legends ==
According to legend, a daughter of Nakhon Si Thammarat's monarch was kidnapped to loot and demand ransom. But the king's daughter was killed during the journey, and her body was hidden in the hollow of a big mango tree. Her ghostly spirit demonstrated her strength after her death; afterward, people respected and worshiped her. The family in a nearby village will bring their son to the ceremonies to introduce them to her so that she can protect them. They will have the man undertake marriage ceremonies with the spirit when he reaches marriageable age. The male who undertakes marriage ceremonies with Nang mai can marry another lady, but if their firstborn child is a boy, the boy must complete the wedding ceremonies with the Nang mai.

However, if the child does not execute the marriage ceremonies, the family will face an unfavorable occurrence until the wedding ceremony is performed. The family must prepare an offering of a tray of gifts, money, and sacrifice, such as pig head, booze, duck, chicken, fruit, and so on, for the wedding ceremonies. Weddings are only to be performed on Tuesdays and Saturdays. The groom must dress politely, as in a traditional Thai wedding ceremony, but he will also carry a dagger. There will also be a Khan Mak procession ceremony, which will be conducted in an entertaining manner. There is also a folklore of a woman who makes a wish to the ghost and it comes true. As a result, she must fulfill a pledge to the ghost by disguising as a man and marrying the ghost.

== Relationship of Nang Mai with people ==
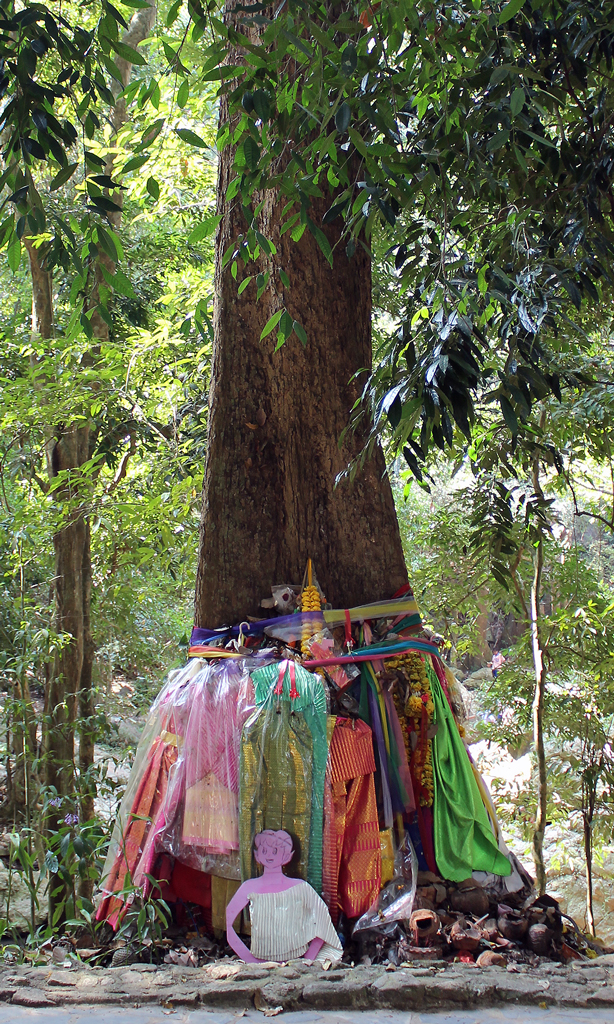
Nang mai shrine

=== Belief ===
In Thai beliefs, Nang Mai had the power to make people fear cutting down trees. They could cast a spell to make people who cut down trees sick or go insane and lose their minds. Nang Mai's sacredness is most likely related to the type and size of the tree. Takhian trees is a high-quality wood with a large trunk, so the ghost who guards it must be a great spirit and very sacred in order to keep this type of tree from being cut down easily. If people want to cut down large trees in the forest, they must first perform a ceremony to ask for forgiveness.

Even Buddhism, which has power over animism, reflects that in order to fight the power of the holy spirits residing in the trees, a compromise method must be used because the spirits residing in the trees are extremely powerful. The Bhutakam Sikkhabha precepts state that monks are not permitted to cut the grass or trees while they are still fresh and green.

=== Nang mai shrine ===
Nowadays, Thai people like to pay homage to large trees by offering Thai costumes, perfumes, and make-up sets. They believe that sacred spirits can be found in large trees. Furthermore, many people believe that Nang Mai or Rukkhadeva, who live in trees, are sacred. and believe that they can improve the lives of those who worship them.

Sao Ronghai is one of Thailand's most popular Nang Mai shrines. It is located at Wat Sung, Tambon Sao Hai, in the Chao Mae Takhian Tong Shrine. It is a large pillar that is believed to be a female spirit because the offerings made to it are all female item. According to legend, when Bangkok was established as the capital, a decree was issued that the most beautiful pillars from across the country would be brought to Bangkok for selection as the City Pillar. Saraburi sent a large Takhian Thong wooden pole discovered in the Dong Phaya Yen forest (Muak Lek) sailing down the Pa Sak River. This pillar traveled all the way to Bangkok and was chosen as the first pillar. However, the authorities complained that the pole's tip was crooked. As a result, it was eliminated from consideration. Because of this, the spirit who resided within the tree became depressed. Crying and floating upstream from Bangkok to the Pa Sak River, it lands in front of the Sao Hai District Office. At the time, the villagers heard the sound of a woman crying near the river and went out to take a look. A Takian pole was found floating in the middle of the river and slowly sank. After that, people often heard women crying. As a result, they named the nearby village Ban Sao Hai.

== Modern adaptation ==
=== Movie ===
- พรายตะเคียน (1940)
- ตะเคียนคู่ (1990)
- Takien (2003)
- Nymph (2009)
- Takien The Haunted Tree (2010)

== See also ==
- Nang Tani
- Nang Ta-khian
- Yokkaso
