= 1938 in association football =

The following are the association football events of the year 1938 throughout the world.

== Winners club national championship ==
- Argentina: Independiente
- France: FC Sochaux-Montbéliard
- Germany: Hannover 96
- Italy: Internazionale Milano F.C.
- Netherlands: Feyenoord Rotterdam
- Paraguay: Olimpia Asunción
- Poland: Ruch Chorzów
- Romania: Ripensia Timișoara
- Scotland: Celtic
- Turkey: Güneş SK
- Soviet Union: Spartak Moscow

Manchester City F.C. become the only team in history to be relegated the year after being champions of England.

== International tournaments ==
- 1938 British Home Championship (October 23, 1937 – April 9, 1938)

England

- FIFA World Cup in France (June 4 – 19 1938)
  1. Italy
  2. Hungary
  3. Brazil
- 1938 Bolivarian Games
  1. Peru
  2. Bolivia
  3. Ecuador

== Births ==
- 1 February: Michael Collins, English former professional footballer
- 6 February: Graham Reed, English former professional footballer
- 14 March: Árpád Orbán, Hungarian footballer (died 2008)
- 17 March: Adolf Knoll, Austrian football player (died 2018)
- 24 March: Alan Collier, English former professional footballer
- 19 April: Stanko Poklepović, Croatian football player and manager (died 2018)
- 1 June: Dieter Klaußner, German former professional footballer
- 7 June: Armando Tobar, Chilean international footballer (died 2016)
- 25 June: Enver Yulgushov, Russian professional footballer and coach (died 2022)
- 26 June:
  - Gene Gaines, American football (soccer) player
  - John Leiper, Scottish former footballer
- 29 June:
  - József Gelei, Hungarian football player and manager
  - Giampaolo Menichelli, Italian winger
- 2 July: Marcel Artelesa, French international footballer (died 2016)
- 3 July: Sjaak Swart, Dutch footballer
- 6 July:
  - Uli Maslo, German football player and manager
  - Oleh Bazylevych, Ukrainian footballer, coach, and sport administrator (died 2018)
- 8 July: Vojtech Masný, Slovak football player
- 12 July: Lin Shllaku, Albanian footballer (died 2016)
- 28 July: Luis Aragonés, Spanish international football player and manager (died 2014)
- 28 August: Đorđe Pavlić, Yugoslavian international footballer (died 2015)
- 22 October: César Luis Menotti, Argentine football player and manager (died 2024)
- 2 December: Luis Artime, Argentine international footballer
- 9 December: Nikola Kotkov, Bulgarian international footballer (died 1971)
- 14 December: Willie Purvis, English professional footballer (died 2012)
