= Anomalistic psychology =

Branch of psychology

In psychology, anomalistic psychology is the study of human behaviour and experience connected with what is often called the paranormal, with few assumptions made about the validity of the reported phenomena.

== Early history ==
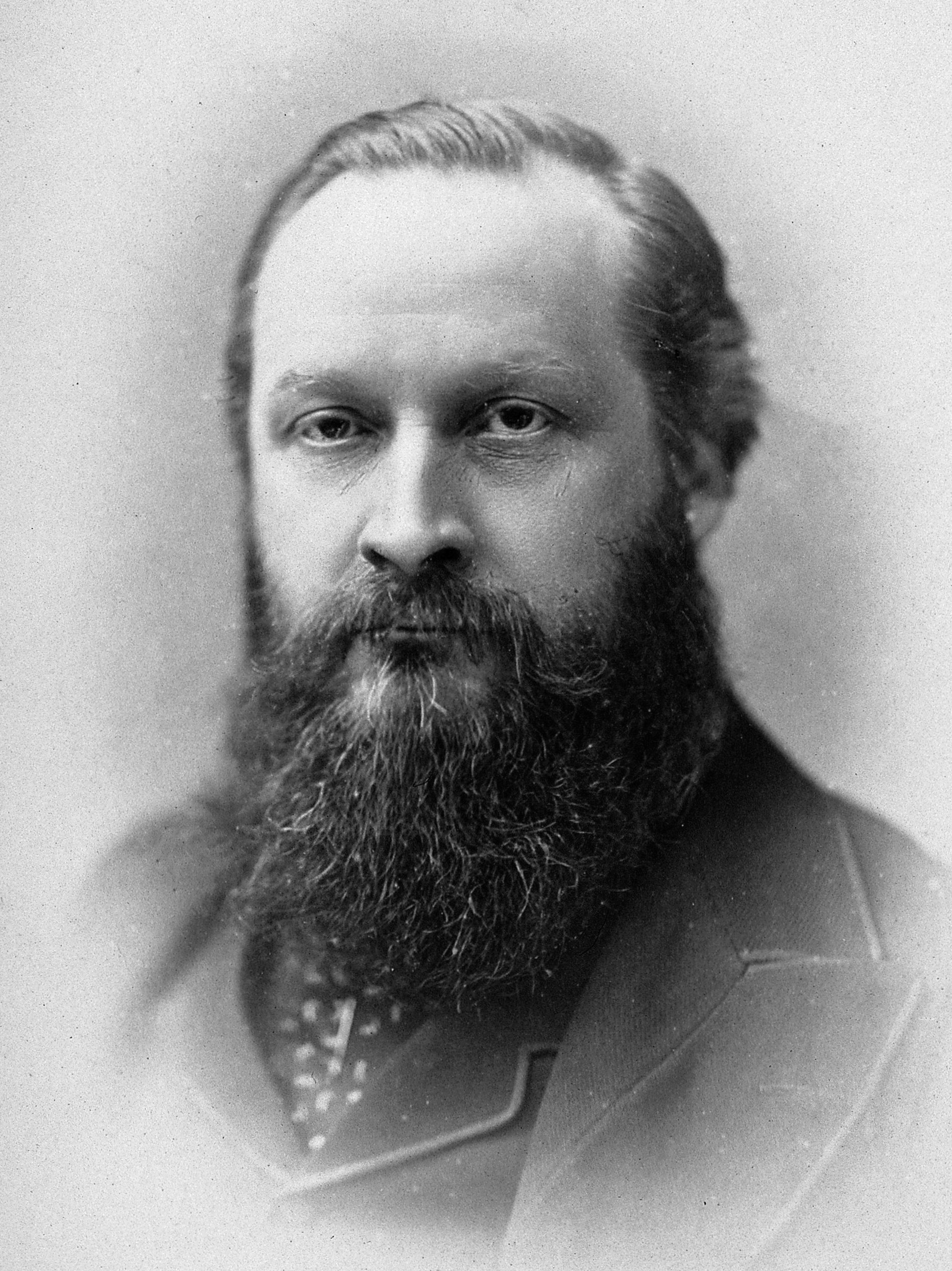
Henry Maudsley (1835–1918), an early researcher in anomalistic psychology

According to anomalistic psychology, paranormal phenomena have naturalistic explanations resulting from psychological and physical factors which have given the false impression of paranormal activity to some people. There were many early publications that gave rational explanations for alleged paranormal experiences.

The physician John Ferriar wrote An Essay Towards a Theory of Apparitions in 1813 in which he argued that sightings of ghosts were the result of optical illusions. Later, the French physician Alexandre Jacques François Brière de Boismont published On Hallucinations: Or, the Rational History of Apparitions, Dreams, Ecstasy, Magnetism, and Somnambulism in 1845 in which he claimed sightings of ghosts were the result of hallucinations. William Benjamin Carpenter, in his book Mesmerism, Spiritualism, Etc: Historically and Scientifically Considered (1877), wrote that Spiritualist practices could be explained by fraud, delusion, hypnotism and suggestion. The British psychiatrist Henry Maudsley, in Natural Causes and Supernatural Seemings (1886), wrote that so-called supernatural experiences could be explained in terms of disorders of the mind and were simply "malobservations and misinterpretations of nature".

In the 1890s, the German psychologist Max Dessoir and psychiatrist Albert Moll formed the "critical occultism" position. This viewpoint interpreted psychical phenomena naturalistically. All apparent cases were attributed to fraud, suggestion, unconscious cues or psychological factors. Moll wrote that practices such as Christian Science, Spiritualism and occultism were the result of fraud and hypnotic suggestion. Moll argued that suggestion explained the cures of Christian Science, as well as the apparently supernatural rapport between magnetisers and their somnambulists. He wrote that fraud and hypnotism could explain mediumistic phenomena.

Lionel Weatherly (a psychiatrist) and John Nevil Maskelyne (a magician) wrote The Supernatural? (1891) which offered rational explanations for apparitions, paranormal and religious experiences and Spiritualism. Karl Jaspers, in his book General Psychopathology (1913), stated that all paranormal phenomena are manifestations of psychiatric symptoms.

The German Zeitschrift für Kritischen Okkultismus (Journal for Critical Occultism) operated from 1926 to 1928. Psychologist Richard Baerwald was the editor, and the journal published articles by Dessoir, Moll and others. It contained "some of the most important skeptical investigations of claims of the paranormal".

Other early scientists who studied anomalistic psychology include Millais Culpin, Joseph Jastrow, Charles Arthur Mercier and Ivor Lloyd Tuckett.

== Modern research ==
The phrase "Anomalistic Psychology" was a term first suggested by the psychologists Leonard Zusne and Warren Jones in their book Anomalistic Psychology: A Study of Magical Thinking (1989) which systematically addresses phenomena of human consciousness and behaviors that may appear to violate the laws of nature when they actually do not.

The Canadian psychologist Graham Reed published a major work on the subject The Psychology of Anomalous Experience (1972).

Various psychological publications have explained in detail how reported paranormal phenomena such as mediumship, precognition, out-of-body experiences and psychics can be explained by psychological factors without recourse to the supernatural. Researchers involved with anomalistic psychology try to provide plausible non-paranormal accounts, supported by empirical evidence, of how psychological and physical factors might combine to give the impression of paranormal activity when there had been none. Apart from deception or self-deception such explanations might involve cognitive biases, anomalous psychological states, dissociative states, hallucinations, personality factors, developmental issues and the nature of memory.

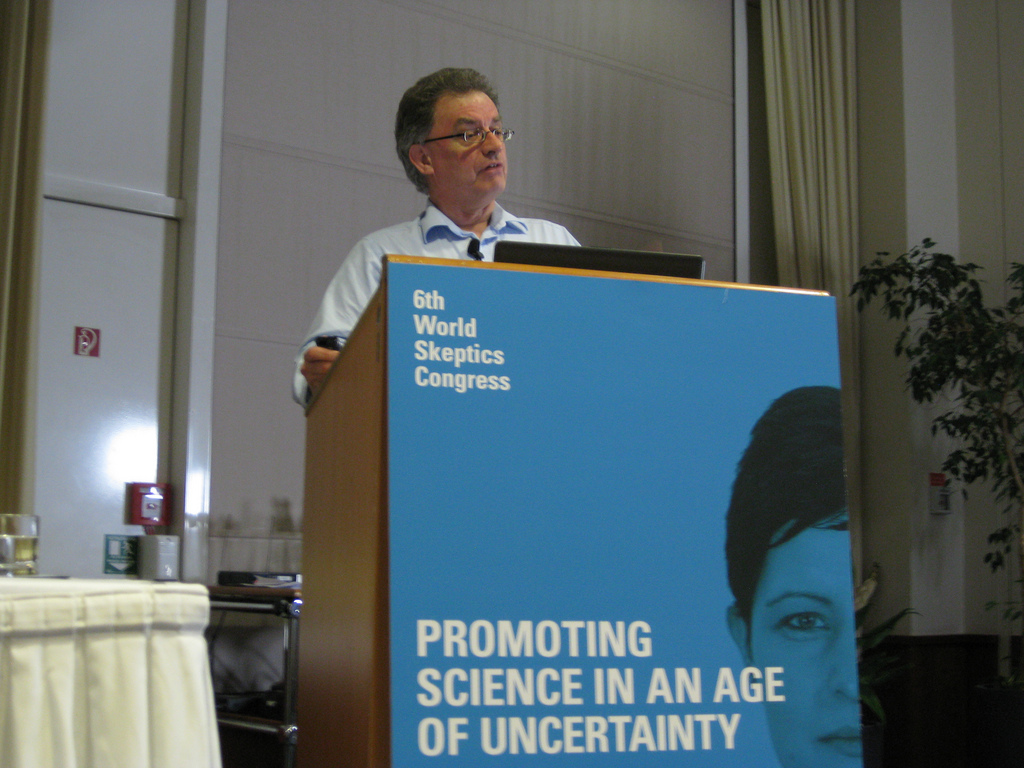
Chris French, founder of the Anomalistic Psychology Research Unit.

The psychologist David Marks wrote that paranormal phenomena can be explained by magical thinking, mental imagery, subjective validation, coincidence, hidden causes, and fraud. Robert Baker wrote that many paranormal phenomena can be explained via psychological effects such as hallucinations, sleep paralysis and hidden memories, a phenomenon in which experiences that originally make little conscious impression are filed away in the brain to be suddenly remembered later in an altered form.

In his 1980 edition of ESP: A Scientific Evaluation, C. E. M. Hansel noted that "after 100 years of research, not a single individual has been found who can demonstrate ESP to the satisfaction of independent investigators. For this reason alone it is unlikely that ESP exists".

Massimo Polidoro, a professor of Anomalistic Psychology at the University of Milano Bicocca, Italy, taught the course "Scientific Method, Pseudoscience and Anomalistic Psychology". Another notable researcher is the British psychologist Chris French who set up the Anomalistic Psychology Research Unit (APRU) in the Department of Psychology at Goldsmiths, University of London.

=== Hauntings ===
A psychological study (Klemperer, 1992) of ghosts wrote that visions of ghosts may arise from hypnagogic hallucinations ("waking dreams" which are experienced in the transitional states to and from sleep). In an experiment (Lange and Houran, 1997) 22 subjects visited five areas of a performance theatre and were asked to take note of the environment. Half of the subjects were informed that the locations they were in were haunted, whilst the other half were told that the building was simply under renovation. The subjects' perceptions in both groups were recorded to an experiential questionnaire which contained 10 subscales related to psychological and physiological perceptions. The results showed more intense perceptual experiences on nine of the ten subscales from the group that was told the building was haunted, which has indicated that demand characteristics alone can stimulate paranormal experiences.

A study (Lange and Houran, 1998) suggested that poltergeist experiences are delusions "resulting from the affective and cognitive dynamics of percipients' interpretation of ambiguous stimuli".

Two experiments into alleged hauntings (Wiseman et al. 2003) discovered that the data supported the "notion that people consistently report unusual experiences in ‘haunted’ areas because of environmental factors, which may differ across locations." Some of these factors included "the variance of local magnetic fields, size of location and lighting level stimuli of which witnesses may not be consciously aware".

=== Mediumship ===
Research and empirical evidence from psychology for over a hundred years has revealed that where there is not fraud, mediumship and Spiritualistic practices can be explained by psychological factors. Trance mediumship, which is claimed by the Spiritualists to be caused by discarnate spirits speaking through the medium, has been proven in some cases to be the emergence of alternate personalities from the medium's subconscious mind.

The medium may obtain information about their clients, called sitters, by secretly eavesdropping on sitter's conversations or searching telephone directories, the internet and newspapers before the sittings. Mediums are known for employing a technique called cold reading which involves obtaining information from the sitter's behavior, clothing, posture, and jewellery.

In a series of fake seance experiments (Wiseman et al. 2003), an actor suggested to paranormal believers and disbelievers that a table was levitating when, in fact, it remained stationary. After the seance, approximately one third of the participants incorrectly reported that the table had moved. The results showed a greater percentage of believers reporting that the table had moved. In another experiment the believers had also reported that a handbell had moved when it had remained stationary and expressed their belief that the fake seances contained genuine paranormal phenomena. The experiments strongly supported the notion that in the seance room, believers are more suggestible than disbelievers to suggestions that are consistent with their belief in paranormal phenomena.

An experiment (O'Keeffe and Wiseman, 2005) involving 5 mediums found no evidence to support the notion that the mediums under controlled conditions were able to demonstrate paranormal or mediumistic ability.

=== Paranormal healing ===
A study in the British Medical Journal (Rose, 1954) investigated spiritual healing, therapeutic touch and faith healing. In a hundred cases that were investigated no single case revealed that the healer's intervention alone resulted in any improvement or cure of a measurable organic disability.

A trial was carried out by a group of scientists (Beutler, 1988) to see whether three treatment groups, paranormal laying on of hands, paranormal healing at a distance and no paranormal healing to test if they might reduce blood pressure. The data did not reveal any paranormal effects as no significant differences between the three treatment groups were found. The results concluded that the fall in blood pressure in all three of the groups was caused by the psychosocial approach and the placebo effect of the trial itself.

One form of paranormal healing known as psychic surgery has been discovered to be the result of sleight of hand tricks. Psychic surgeons pretend to reach into the patient's body but the skin is never punctured, there are no scars and the blood is released from packets hidden in the surgeon's hands.

=== Psychokinesis ===
Cognitive biases have been found in some cases of psychokinesis. A meta-analysis by Bösch, et al (2006) of 380 studies found that "statistical significance of the overall database provides no directive as to whether the phenomenon is genuine or not" and came to the conclusion that "publication bias appears to be the easiest and most encompassing explanation for the primary findings of the meta-analysis."

According to Richard Wiseman there are a number of ways for faking psychokinetic metal bending (PKMB) these include switching straight objects for pre-bent duplicates, the concealed application of force, and secretly inducing metallic fractures. Research has also suggested that (PKMB) effects can be created by verbal suggestion. On this subject (Harris, 1985) wrote:

If you are doing a really convincing job, then you should be able to put a bent key on the table and comment, 'Look, it is still bending', and have your spectators really believe that it is. This may sound the height of boldness; however, the effect is astounding – and combined with suggestion, it does work.

In an experimental study (Wiseman and Greening, 2005) two groups of participants were shown a videotape in which a fake psychic placed a bent key on a table. Participants in the first group heard the fake psychic suggest that the key was continuing to bend when it had remained stationary, whilst those in the second group did not. The results revealed that participants from the first group reported significantly more movement of the key than the second group. The findings were replicated in another study. The experiments had demonstrated that "testimony for PKMB after effects can be created by verbal suggestion, and therefore the testimony from individuals who have observed allegedly genuine demonstrations of such effects should not be seen as strong evidence in support of the paranormal".

=== Remote viewing ===
Research has suggested that in cases the participants of remote viewing experiments are influenced by subjective validation, a process through which correspondences are perceived between stimuli that are in fact associated purely randomly. Sensory cues have also occurred in remote viewing experiments.

=== Telepathy ===
Research has discovered that in some cases telepathy can be explained by a covariation bias. In an experiment (Schienle et al. 1996) 22 believers and 20 skeptics were asked to judge the covariation between transmitted symbols and the corresponding feedback given by a receiver. According to the results the believers overestimated the number of successful transmissions whilst the skeptics made accurate hit judgments. The results from another telepathy experiment involving 48 undergraduate college students (Rudski, 2002) were explained by hindsight and confirmation biases.

== Relationship with parapsychology ==
Anomalistic psychology is sometimes described as a sub-field of parapsychology, however, anomalistic psychology rejects the paranormal claims of parapsychology. According to Chris French:

The difference between anomalistic psychology and parapsychology is in terms of the aims of what each discipline is about. Parapsychologists typically are actually searching for evidence to prove the reality of paranormal forces, to prove they really do exist. So the starting assumption is that paranormal things do happen, whereas anomalistic psychologists tend to start from the position that paranormal forces probably don't exist and that therefore we should be looking for other kinds of explanations, in particular the psychological explanations for those experiences that people typically label as paranormal.

Anomalistic psychology has been reported to be on the rise. It is now offered as an option on many psychology degree programmes and is also an option on the A2 psychology syllabus in the UK.

== See also ==
- Australian Sheep-Goat Scale
- Psychology of paranormal belief
