= Graham Reed =

Graham Reed may refer to:

- Graham Reed (footballer, born 1961), English football forward
- Graham Reed (footballer, born 1938), English football wing half
- Graham Reed (psychologist) (1923–1989), Canadian psychologist

== See also ==
- Graham Reid (disambiguation)
