= Ghost =

Supernatural being originating in folklore

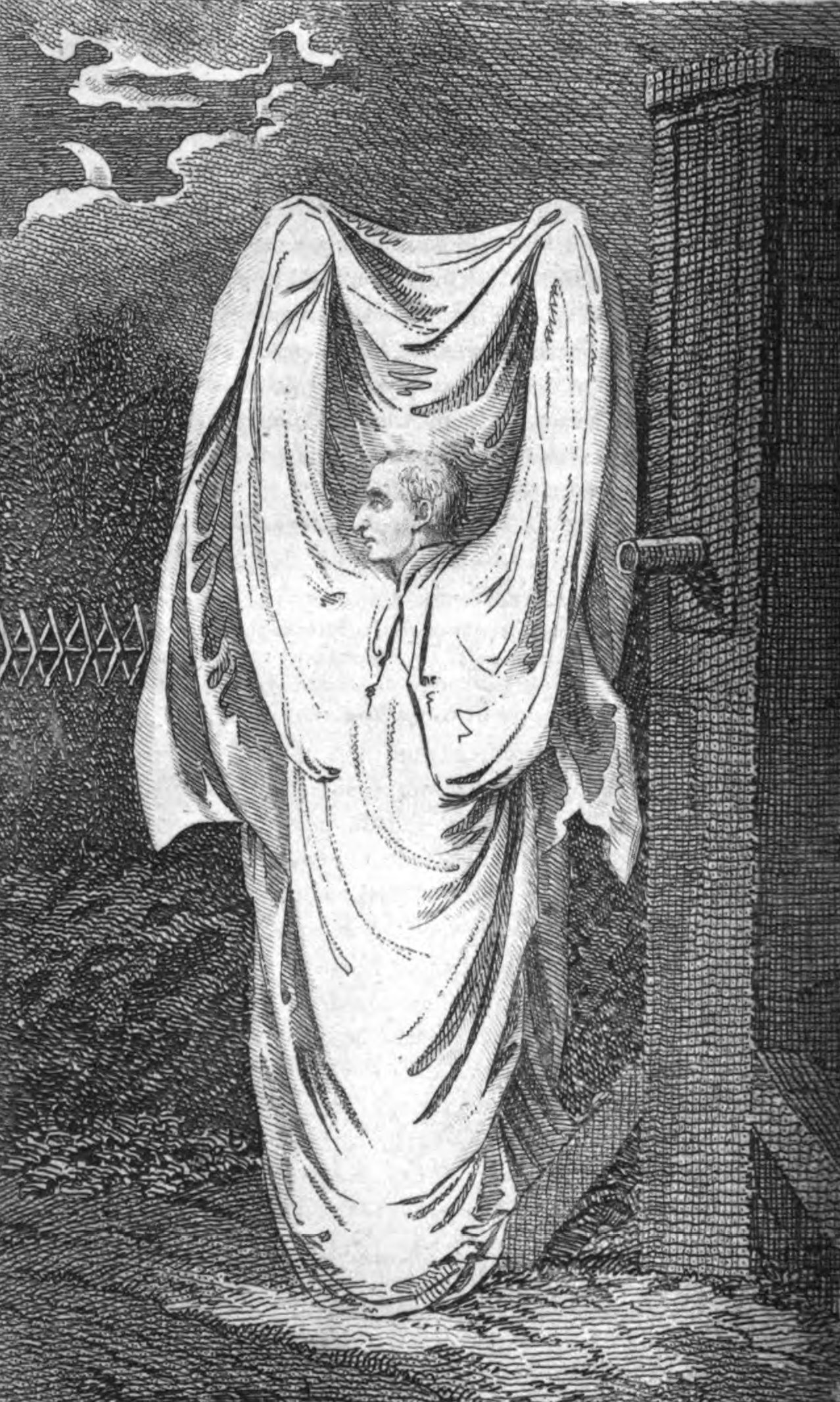
An engraving of the Hammersmith Ghost appears in Roger Kirby's Wonderful and Scientific Museum, a magazine published in 1804. The "ghost" turned out to be an old local cobbler who used a white sheet to get back at his apprentice for scaring his children.

In folklore, a ghost is the soul or spirit of a dead person or non-human animal that is believed by some people to be able to appear to the living. In ghostlore, descriptions of ghosts vary widely, from an invisible presence to translucent or barely visible wispy shapes to realistic, lifelike forms, whether they resemble humans or animals. The deliberate attempt to contact the spirit of a deceased person is known as necromancy, or in spiritism as a séance. Other terms associated with it are apparition, haunt, haint, phantom, poltergeist, shade, specter, spirit, spook, wraith, demon, and ghoul.

The belief in the existence of an afterlife, as well as manifestations of the spirits of the dead, is widespread, dating back to animism or ancestor worship in pre-literate cultures. Certain religious practices—funeral rites, exorcisms, and some practices of spiritualism and ritual magic—are specifically designed to rest the spirits of the dead. Ghosts are generally described as solitary, human-like essences, though stories of ghostly armies and the ghosts of animals other than humans have also been recounted. They are believed to haunt particular locations, objects, or people they were associated with in life. According to a 2009 study by the Pew Research Center, 18% of Americans say they have seen a ghost.

Ghosts are not a scientifically testable concept. The existence of ghosts is impossible to falsify, and ghost hunting has been classified as pseudoscience. Despite centuries of investigation, there is no scientific evidence that any location is inhabited by the spirits of the dead. Historically, certain toxic and psychoactive plants (such as datura and hyoscyamus niger), whose use has long been associated with necromancy and the underworld, have been shown to contain anticholinergic compounds that are pharmacologically linked to dementia (specifically DLB) as well as histological patterns of neurodegeneration. Recent research has indicated that ghost sightings may be related to degenerative brain diseases such as Alzheimer's disease. Common prescription medication and over-the-counter drugs (such as sleep aids) may also, in rare instances, cause ghost-like hallucinations, particularly zolpidem and diphenhydramine. Older reports linked carbon monoxide poisoning to ghost-like hallucinations.

In folklore studies, ghosts fall within the motif index designation E200–E599 ("Ghosts and other revenants").

== Terminology ==
=== Etymology ===
The English word ghost comes from Old English gāst ("breath, spirit, soul, ghost"), which can be traced back to Proto-Germanic *gaistaz ("spirit, ghost"). It is cognate (linguistic sibling from a common origin) with Old Frisian gāst ("spirit, ghost, demon"), Old Saxon gēst ("soul, vitality, spirit, demon"), Old Dutch gēst ("spirit"), and Old High German geist ("spirit"). Although recorded descendants do not appear in North and East Germanic sources (where Gothic uses ahma and Old Norse uses andi m. or önd f.), linguists reconstruct *gaistaz as stemming from pre-Germanic *ghois-t-oz ("fury, anger"). This reconstruction is supported by its connection to Sanskrit hīḍ- ("to be angry") and héḍa ("anger"), and to Avestan zōižda- ("terrible"; in zōiždišta "most terrible").

The common Proto-Indo-European form is posited as *ǵʰoys-d-os, a dental suffix derivative of the root ǵʰéys-. This root also appears Proto-Germanic *gaistjan ("to terrify"; compare Old English gǽstan and Gothic usgaisjan), in Old Norse *geiski ("fear"; implied in geiskafullr, "full of fear"), and in Avestan zōiš- (in zōišnu, "shivering, trembling").

Besides denoting a "person's spirit or soul" (as "the life force" or "breath of life" that gives life to the body, in contrast to its purely material being), the Old English word is also used as a synonym of Latin spīritus in the meaning of "the breath of God or a god" from the earliest attestations (9th century). It could also denote any good or evil spirit, such as angels and demons (the Anglo-Saxon gospel refers to the demonic possession of Matthew 12:43 as se unclæna gast). Also from the Old English period, the word could denote the spirit of God, the "Holy Ghost" (halgan gaste), after post-classical Latin spiritus sanctus.

=== Usage and synonyms ===
The now-prevailing sense of "the soul of a deceased person, spoken of as appearing in a visible form" only emerges in Middle English (14th century). The modern noun does, however, retain a wider field of application, extending on one hand to "soul", "spirit", "vital principle", "mind", or "psyche", the seat of feeling, thought, and moral judgement; on the other hand used figuratively of any shadowy outline, or fuzzy or unsubstantial image; in optics, photography, and cinematography especially, a flare, secondary image, or spurious signal.

The synonym spook is a Dutch loanword, akin to Low German spôk (of uncertain etymology); it entered the English language via American English in the 19th century. Alternative words in modern usage include spectre (altn. specter; from Latin spectrum), the Scottish wraith (of obscure origin), phantom (via French ultimately from Greek phantasma, compare fantasy) and apparition. The term shade in classical mythology translates Greek σκιά, or Latin umbra, in reference to the notion of spirits in the Greek underworld. The term poltergeist is a German word, literally a "noisy ghost", for a spirit said to manifest itself by invisibly moving and influencing objects.

Wraith is a Scots word for ghost, spectre, or apparition. It appeared in Scottish Romanticist literature, and acquired the more general or figurative sense of portent or omen. In 18th- to 19th-century Scottish literature, it also applied to aquatic spirits. The word has no commonly accepted etymology; the OED notes "of obscure origin" only. An association with the verb writhe was the etymology favored by J. R. R. Tolkien. Tolkien's use of the word in the naming of the creatures known as the Ringwraiths has influenced later usage in fantasy literature. Bogey or bogy/bogie is a term for a ghost, and appears in Scottish poet John Mayne's Hallowe'en in 1780.

A revenant is a deceased person returning from the dead to haunt the living, either as a disembodied ghost or alternatively as an animated ("undead") corpse. Also related is the concept of a fetch, the visible ghost or spirit of a person yet alive.

== Typology ==
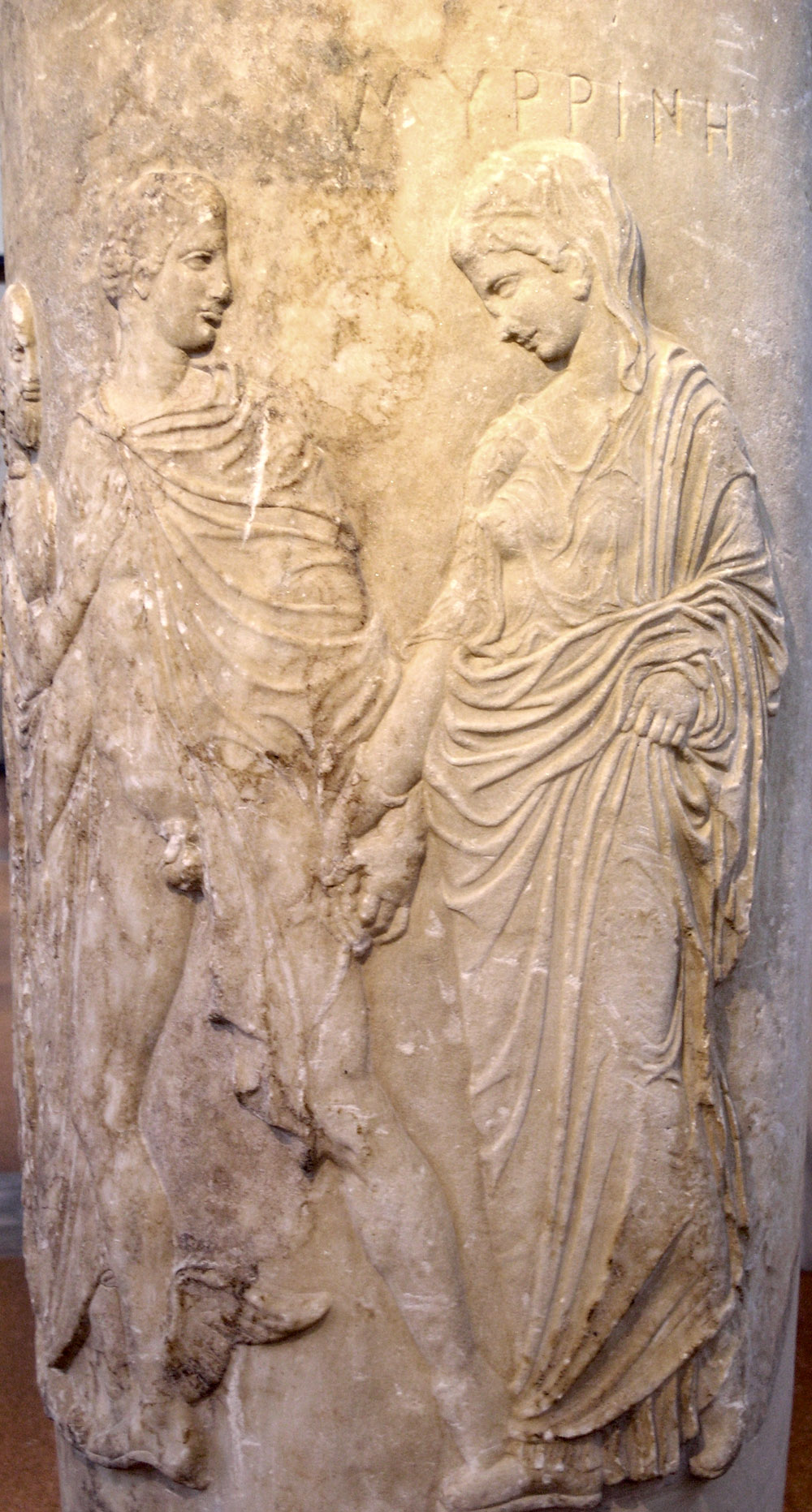
Relief from a carved funerary lekythos at Athens showing Hermes as psychopomp conducting the soul of the deceased, Myrrhine into Hades (c. 430–420 BC)

=== Anthropological context ===
A notion of the transcendent, supernatural, or numinous, usually involving entities like ghosts, demons, or deities, is a cultural universal. In pre-literate folk religions, these beliefs are often summarized under animism and ancestor worship. Some people believe the ghost or spirit never leaves Earth until there is no-one left to remember the one who died.

In many cultures, malignant, restless ghosts are distinguished from the more benign spirits involved in ancestor worship.

Ancestor worship typically involves rites intended to prevent revenants, vengeful spirits of the dead, imagined as starving and envious of the living. Strategies for preventing revenants may either include sacrifice; that is, giving the dead food and drink to pacify them, or magical banishment of the deceased to force them not to return. Ritual feeding of the dead is performed in traditions like the Chinese Ghost Festival or the Western All Souls' Day. Magical banishment of the dead is present in many of the world's burial customs. The bodies found in many tumuli (kurgan) had been ritually bound before burial, and the custom of binding the dead persists, for example, in rural Anatolia.

Nineteenth-century anthropologist James Frazer stated in his classic work The Golden Bough that souls were seen as the creature within that animated the body.

=== Ghosts and the afterlife ===
Although the human soul was sometimes symbolically or literally depicted in ancient cultures as a bird or other animal, it appears to have been widely held that the soul was an exact reproduction of the body in every feature, even down to clothing the person wore. This is depicted in artwork from various ancient cultures, including such works as the Egyptian Book of the Dead, which shows deceased people in the afterlife appearing much as they did before death, including the style of dress.

=== Fear of ghosts ===
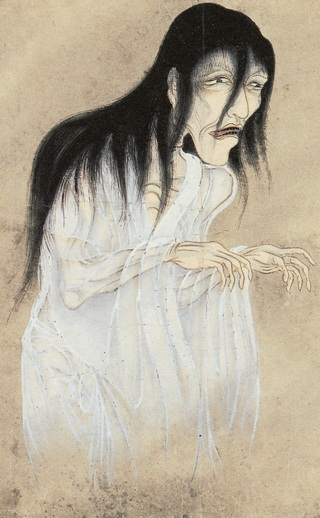
Yūrei (Japanese ghost) from the Hyakkai Zukan, c. 1737

While deceased ancestors are universally regarded as venerable, and often believed to have a continued presence in some form of afterlife, the spirit of a deceased person that persists in the material world (a ghost) is regarded as an unnatural or undesirable state of affairs and the idea of ghosts or revenants is associated with a reaction of fear. This is universally the case in pre-modern folk cultures, but fear of ghosts also remains an integral aspect of the modern ghost story, Gothic horror, and other horror fiction dealing with the supernatural.

=== Common attributes ===
Another widespread belief concerning ghosts is that they are composed of a misty, airy, or subtle material. Anthropologists link this idea to early beliefs that ghosts were the person within the person (the person's spirit), most noticeable in ancient cultures as a person's breath, which upon exhaling in colder climates appears visibly as a white mist. This belief may have also fostered the metaphorical meaning of "breath" in certain languages, such as the Latin spiritus and the Greek pneuma, which by analogy became extended to mean the soul. In the Bible, God is depicted as synthesising Adam, as a living soul, from the dust of the Earth and the breath of God.

In many traditional accounts, ghosts were often thought to be deceased people looking for vengeance (vengeful ghosts), or imprisoned on earth for bad things they did during life. The appearance of a ghost has often been regarded as an omen or portent of death. Seeing one's own ghostly double or "fetch" is a related omen of death. The impetus of haunting is commonly considered an unnatural death.

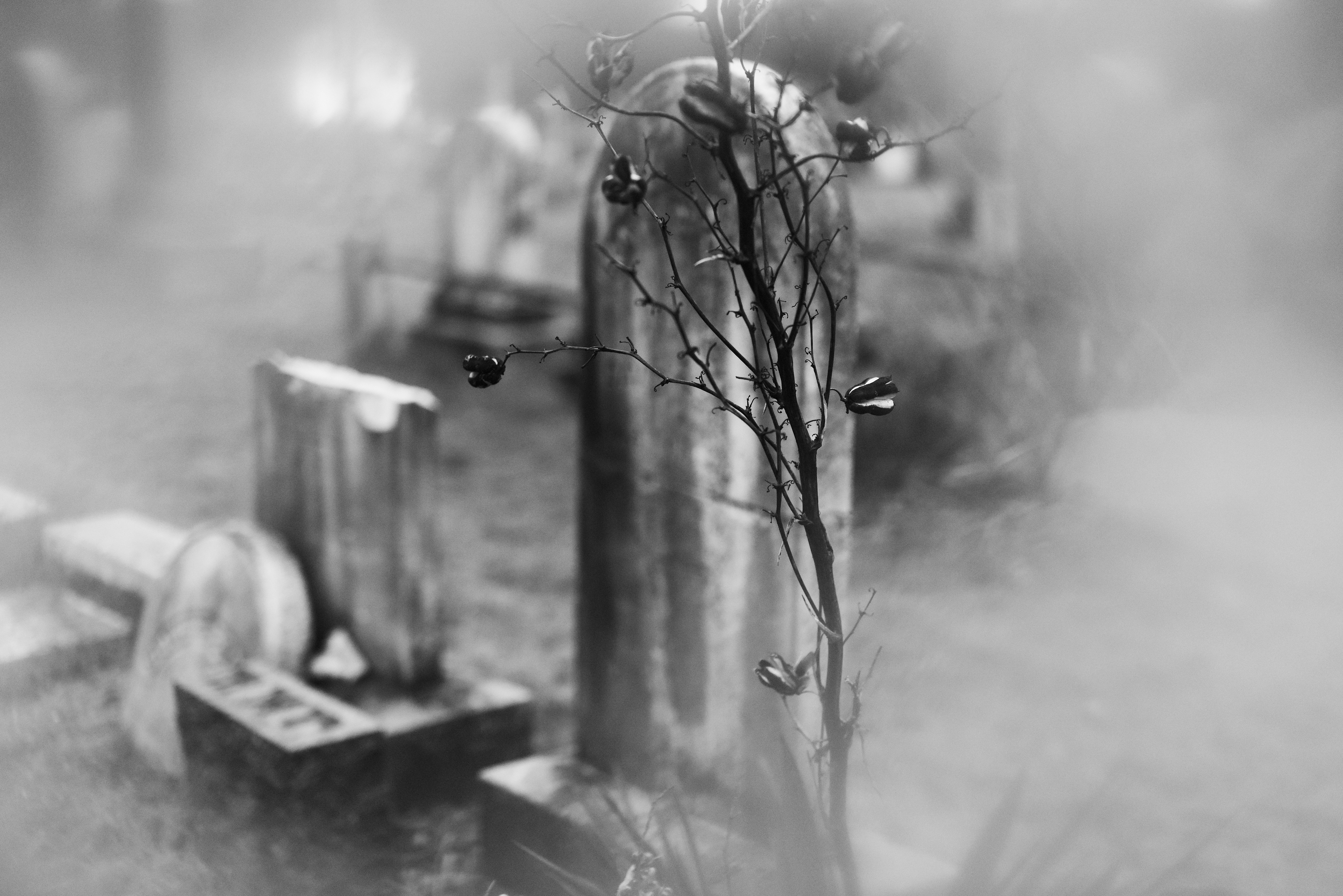
Union Cemetery in Easton, Connecticut, is home to the legend of the White Lady.

White ladies were reported to appear in many rural areas, and supposed to have died tragically or suffered trauma in life. White Lady legends are found around the world. Common to many of them is the theme of losing a child or husband and a sense of purity, as opposed to the Lady in Red ghost that is mostly attributed to a jilted lover or prostitute. The White Lady ghost is often associated with an individual family line or regarded as a harbinger of death similar to a banshee.

Legends of ghost ships have existed since the 18th century; most notable of these is the Flying Dutchman. This theme has been used in literature in The Rime of the Ancient Mariner by Samuel Taylor Coleridge.

Ghosts are often depicted as being covered in a shroud and/or dragging chains.

=== Locale ===
A place where ghosts are reported is described as haunted, and often seen as being inhabited by spirits of deceased who may have been former residents or were familiar with the property. Supernatural activity inside homes is said to be mainly associated with violent or tragic events in the building's past such as murder, accidental death, or suicide—sometimes in the recent or ancient past. However, not all hauntings are at a place of a violent death, or even on violent grounds. Many cultures and religions believe the essence of a being, such as the "soul", continues to exist. Some religious views argue that the "spirits" of those who have died have not "passed over" and are trapped inside the property where their memories and energy are strong.

== History ==
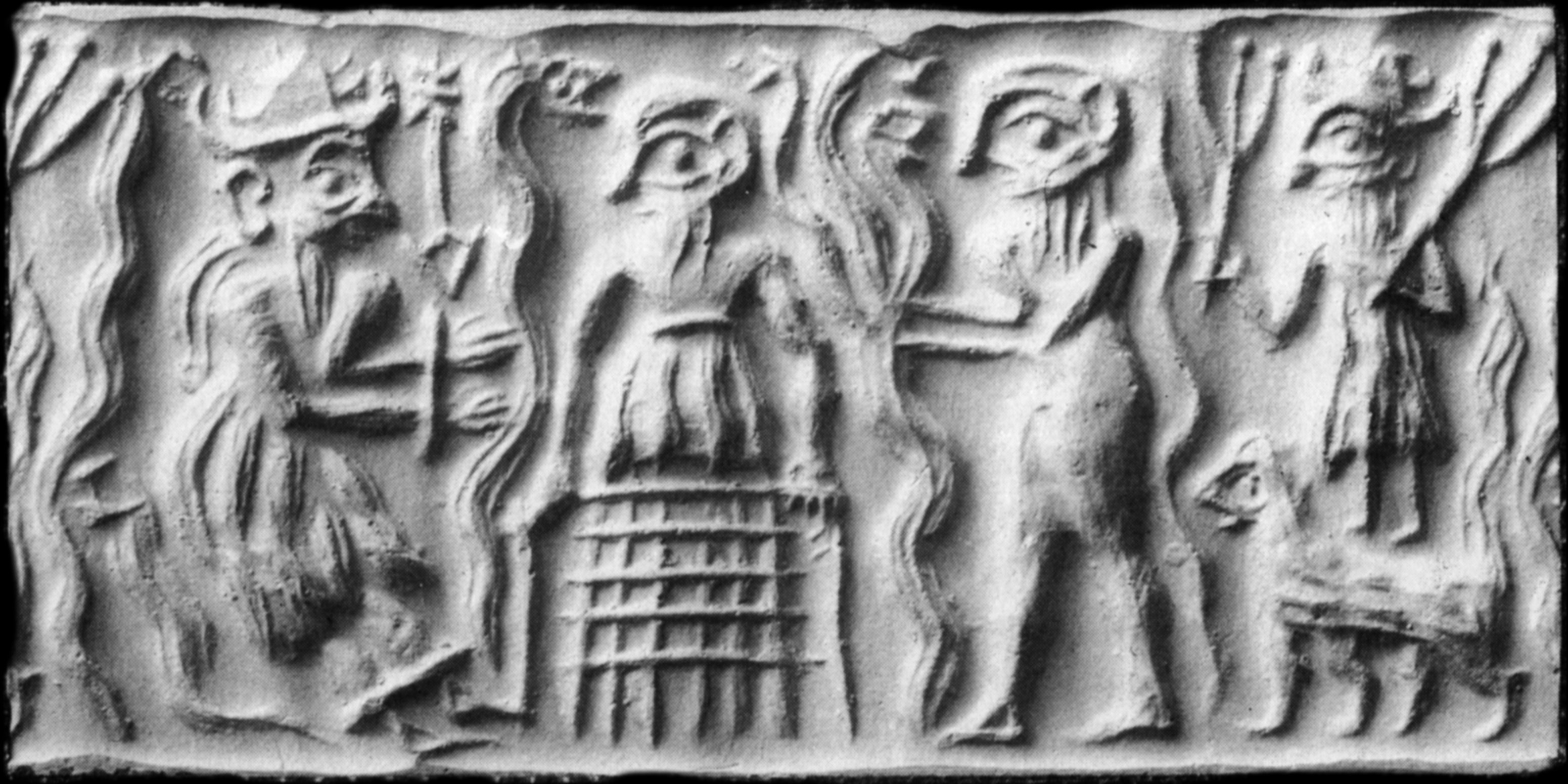
Ancient Sumerian cylinder seal impression showing the god Dumuzid being tortured in the Underworld by galla demons

=== Ancient Near East and Egypt ===
There are many references to ghosts in Mesopotamian religions – the religions of Sumer, Babylon, Assyria, and other early states in Mesopotamia. Traces of these beliefs survive in the later Abrahamic religions that came to dominate the region. The concept of ghosts may predate many belief systems. Ghosts were thought to be created at time of death, taking on the memory and personality of the dead person. They traveled to the netherworld, where they were assigned a position, and led an existence similar in some ways to that of the living. Relatives of the dead were expected to make offerings of food and drink to the dead to ease their conditions. If they did not, the ghosts could inflict misfortune and illness on the living. Traditional healing practices ascribed a variety of illnesses to the action of ghosts, while others were caused by gods or demons.

Egyptian Akh glyph – The soul and spirit re-united after death

There was widespread belief in ghosts in ancient Egyptian culture. The Hebrew Bible contains few references to ghosts, associating spiritism with forbidden occult activities cf. Deuteronomy 18:11. The most notable reference is in the First Book of Samuel (I Samuel 28:3–19 KJV), in which a disguised King Saul has the Witch of Endor summon the spirit or ghost of Samuel.

The soul and spirit were believed to exist after death, with the ability to assist or harm the living, and the possibility of a second death. Over a period of more than 2,500 years, Egyptian beliefs about the nature of the afterlife evolved constantly. Many of these beliefs were recorded in hieroglyph inscriptions, papyrus scrolls and tomb paintings. The Egyptian Book of the Dead compiles some of the beliefs from different periods of ancient Egyptian history. In modern times, the fanciful concept of a mummy coming back to life and wreaking vengeance when disturbed has spawned a whole genre of horror stories and films.

=== Classical Antiquity ===
==== Archaic and Classical Greece ====
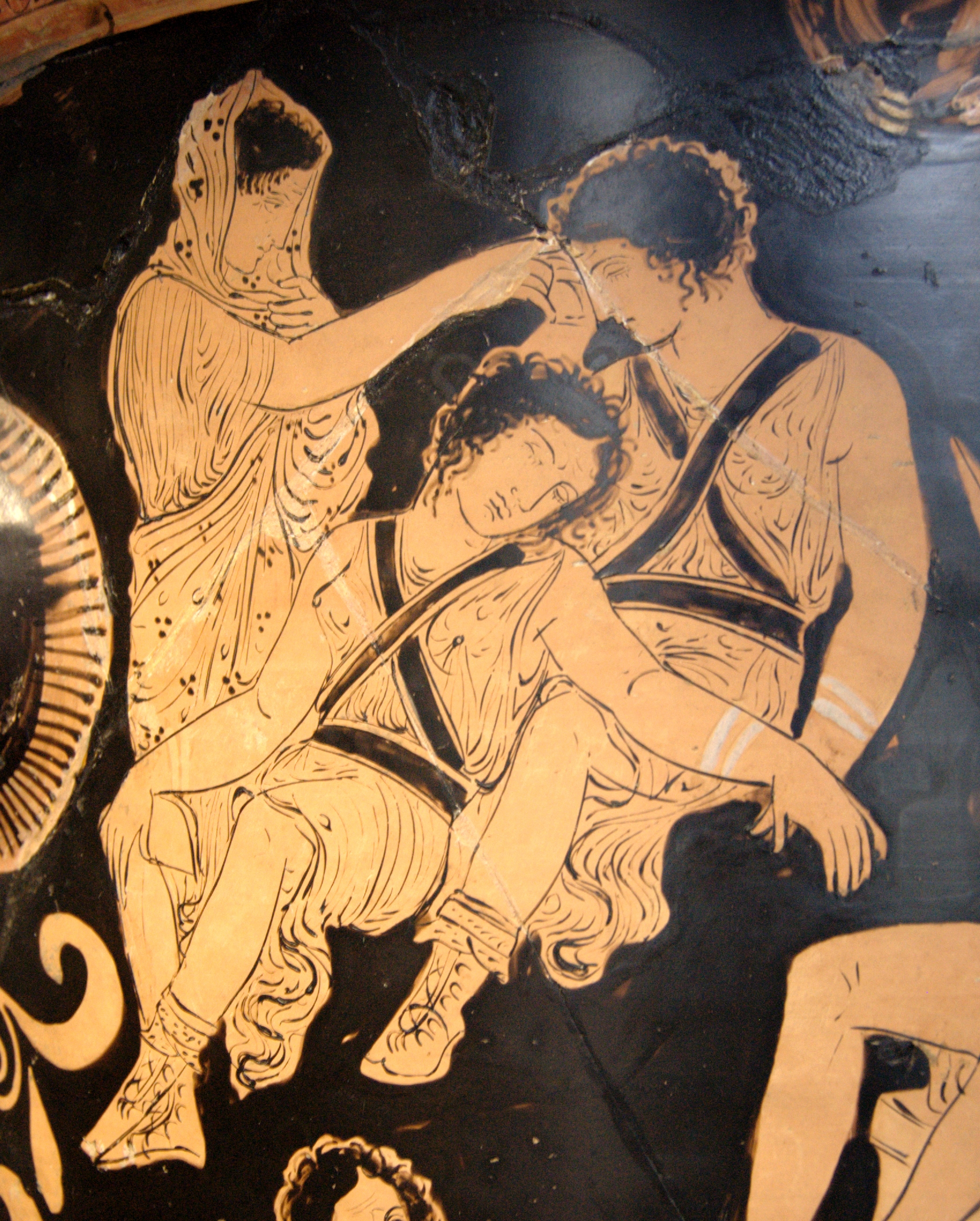
Apulian red-figure bell krater depicting the ghost of Clytemnestra waking the Erinyes, date unknown

Ghosts appeared in Homer's Odyssey and Iliad, in which they were described as vanishing "as a vapor, gibbering and whining into the earth". Homer's ghosts had little interaction with the world of the living. Periodically they were called upon to provide advice or prophecy, but they do not appear to be particularly feared. Ghosts in the classical world often appeared in the form of vapor or smoke, but at other times they were described as being substantial, appearing as they had been at the time of death, complete with the wounds that killed them.

By the 5th century BC, classical Greek ghosts had become haunting, frightening creatures who could work to either good or evil purposes. The spirit of the dead was believed to hover near the resting place of the corpse, and cemeteries were places the living avoided. The dead were to be ritually mourned through public ceremony, sacrifice, and libations, or else they might return to haunt their families. The ancient Greeks held annual feasts to honor and placate the spirits of the dead, to which the family ghosts were invited, and after which they were "firmly invited to leave until the same time next year."

The 5th-century BC play Oresteia includes an appearance of the ghost of Clytemnestra, one of the first ghosts to appear in a work of fiction.

==== Roman Empire and Late Antiquity ====
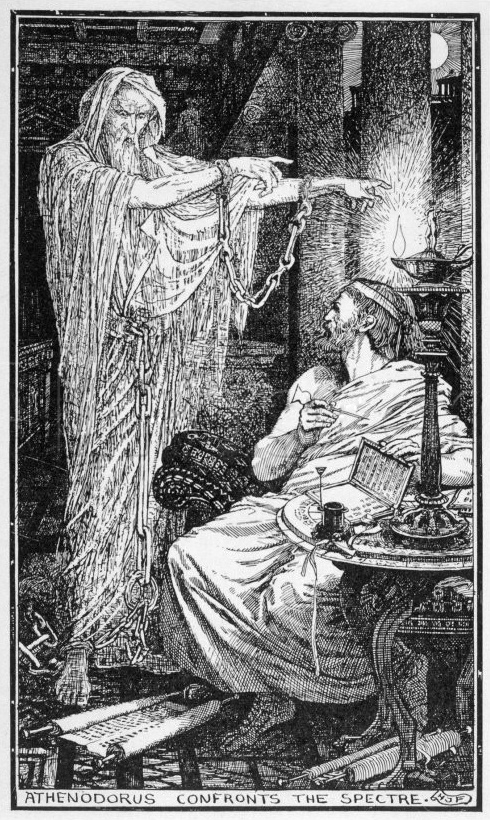
Athenodorus and the Ghost, by Henry Justice Ford, c. 1900

The ancient Romans believed a ghost could be used to exact revenge on an enemy by scratching a curse on a piece of lead or pottery and placing it into a grave.

Plutarch, in the 1st century AD, described the haunting of the baths at Chaeronea by the ghost of a murdered man. The ghost's loud and frightful groans caused the people of the town to seal up the doors of the building. Another celebrated account of a haunted house from the ancient classical world is given by Pliny the Younger (c. 50 AD). Pliny describes the haunting of a house in Athens, which was bought by the Stoic philosopher Athenodorus, who lived about 100 years before Pliny. Knowing that the house was supposedly haunted, Athenodorus intentionally set up his writing desk in the room where the apparition was said to appear and sat there writing until late at night when he was disturbed by a ghost bound in chains. He followed the ghost outside where it indicated a spot on the ground. When Athenodorus later excavated the area, a shackled skeleton was unearthed. The haunting ceased when the skeleton was given a proper reburial. The writers Plautus and Lucian also wrote stories about haunted houses.

In the New Testament, according to Luke 24:37–39, following his resurrection, Jesus was forced to persuade the Disciples that he was not a ghost (some versions of the Bible, such as the KJV and NKJV, use the term "spirit"). Similarly, Jesus' followers at first believed he was a ghost (spirit) when they saw him walking on water.

One of the first persons to express disbelief in ghosts was Lucian of Samosata in the 2nd century AD. In his satirical novel The Lover of Lies (c. 150 AD), he relates how Democritus "the learned man from Abdera in Thrace" lived in a tomb outside the city gates to prove that cemeteries were not haunted by the spirits of the departed. Lucian relates how he persisted in his disbelief despite practical jokes perpetrated by "some young men of Abdera" who dressed up in black robes with skull masks to frighten him. This account by Lucian notes something about the popular classical expectation of how a ghost should look.

In the 5th century AD, the Christian priest Constantius of Lyon recorded an instance of the recurring theme of the improperly buried dead who come back to haunt the living, and who can only cease their haunting when their bones have been discovered and properly reburied.

=== Middle Ages ===
Ghosts reported in medieval Europe tended to fall into two categories: the souls of the dead, or demons. The souls of the dead returned for a specific purpose. Demonic ghosts existed only to torment or tempt the living. The living could tell them apart by demanding their purpose in the name of Jesus Christ. The soul of a dead person would divulge its mission, while a demonic ghost would be banished at the sound of the Holy Name.

Most ghosts were souls assigned to Purgatory, condemned for a specific period to atone for their transgressions in life. Their penance was generally related to their sin. For example, the ghost of a man who had been abusive to his servants was condemned to tear off and swallow bits of his own tongue; the ghost of another man, who had neglected to leave his cloak to the poor, was condemned to wear the cloak, now "heavy as a church tower". These ghosts appeared to the living to ask for prayers to end their suffering. Other dead souls returned to urge the living to confess their sins before their own deaths.

Medieval European ghosts were more substantial than ghosts described in the Victorian age, and there are accounts of ghosts being wrestled with and physically restrained until a priest could arrive to hear its confession. Some were less solid, and could move through walls. Often they were described as paler and sadder versions of the person they had been while alive, and dressed in tattered gray rags. The vast majority of reported sightings were male.

There were some reported cases of ghostly armies, fighting battles at night in the forest, or in the remains of an Iron Age hillfort, as at Wandlebury, near Cambridge, England. Living knights were sometimes challenged to single combat by phantom knights, which vanished when defeated.

From the medieval period an apparition of a ghost is recorded from 1211, at the time of the Albigensian Crusade. Gervase of Tilbury, Marshal of Arles, wrote that the image of Guilhem, a boy recently murdered in the forest, appeared in his cousin's home in Beaucaire, near Avignon. This series of "visits" lasted all of the summer. Through his cousin, who spoke for him, the boy allegedly held conversations with anyone who wished, until the local priest requested to speak to the boy directly, leading to an extended disquisition on theology. The boy narrated the trauma of death and the unhappiness of his fellow souls in Purgatory, and reported that God was most pleased with the ongoing Crusade against the Cathar heretics, launched three years earlier. The time of the Albigensian Crusade in southern France was marked by intense and prolonged warfare, this constant bloodshed and dislocation of populations being the context for these reported visits by the murdered boy.

Haunted houses are featured in the 9th-century Arabian Nights (such as the tale of Ali the Cairene and the Haunted House in Baghdad).

=== European Renaissance to Romanticism ===
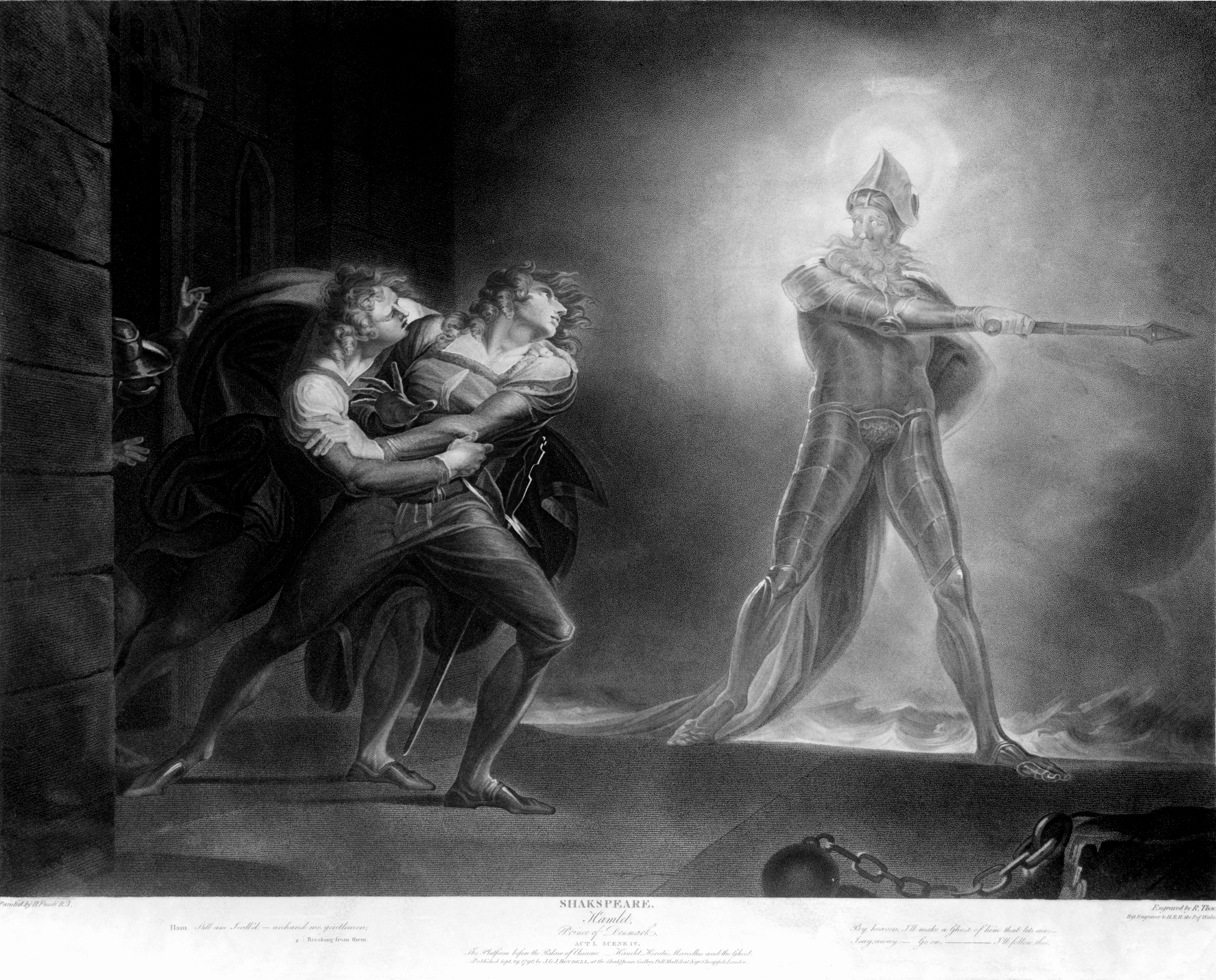
"Hamlet and his father's ghost" by Henry Fuseli (1796 drawing). The ghost is wearing stylized plate armor in 17th-century style, including a morion type helmet and tassets. Depicting ghosts as wearing armor, to suggest a sense of antiquity, was common in Elizabethan theater.

Renaissance magic took a revived interest in the occult, including necromancy. In the era of the Reformation and Counter Reformation, there was frequently a backlash against unwholesome interest in the dark arts, typified by writers such as Thomas Erastus. The Swiss Reformed pastor Ludwig Lavater supplied one of the most frequently reprinted books of the period with his Of Ghosts and Spirits Walking By Night.

The Child Ballad "Sweet William's Ghost" (1868) recounts the story of a ghost returning to his fiancée begging her to free him from his promise to marry her. He cannot marry her because he is dead but her refusal would mean his damnation. This reflects a popular British belief that the dead haunted their lovers if they took up with a new love without some formal release. "The Unquiet Grave" expresses a belief even more widespread, found in various locations over Europe: ghosts can stem from the excessive grief of the living, whose mourning interferes with the dead's peaceful rest. In many folktales from around the world, the hero arranges for the burial of a dead man. Soon after, he gains a companion who aids him and, in the end, the hero's companion reveals that he is in fact the dead man. Instances of this include the Italian fairy tale "Fair Brow" and the Swedish "The Bird 'Grip'".

=== Modern period of western culture ===
==== Spiritualist movement ====
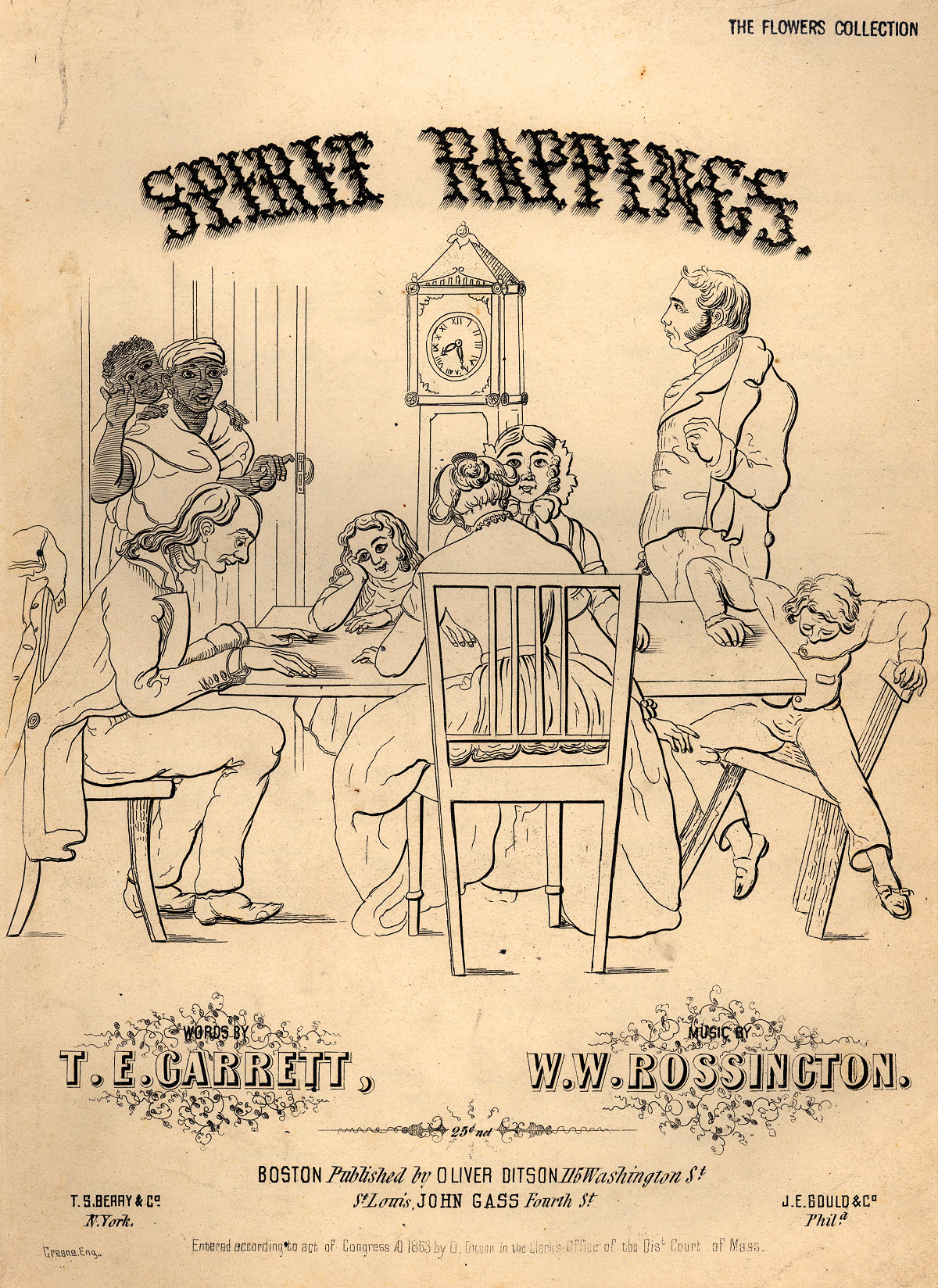
By 1853, when the popular song Spirit Rappings was published, Spiritualism was an object of intense curiosity.

Spiritualism is a monotheistic belief system or religion, postulating a belief in God, but with a distinguishing feature of belief that spirits of the dead residing in the spirit world can be contacted by "mediums", who can then provide information about the afterlife.

Spiritualism developed in the United States and reached its peak growth in membership from the 1840s to the 1920s, especially in English-language countries. By 1897, it was said to have more than eight million followers in the United States and Europe, mostly drawn from the middle and upper classes, while the corresponding movement in continental Europe and Latin America is known as Spiritism.

The religion flourished for a half century without canonical texts or formal organization, attaining cohesion by periodicals, tours by trance lecturers, camp meetings, and the missionary activities of accomplished mediums. Many prominent Spiritualists were women. Most followers supported causes such as the abolition of slavery and women's suffrage. By the late 1880s, credibility of the informal movement weakened, due to accusations of fraud among mediums, and formal Spiritualist organizations began to appear. Spiritualism is currently practiced primarily through various denominational Spiritualist churches in the United States and United Kingdom.

==== Spiritism ====
Spiritism, or French spiritualism, is based on the five books of the Spiritist Codification written by French educator Hypolite Léon Denizard Rivail under the pseudonym Allan Kardec reporting séances in which he observed a series of phenomena that he attributed to incorporeal intelligence (spirits). His assumption of spirit communication was validated by many contemporaries, among them many scientists and philosophers who attended séances and studied the phenomena. His work was later extended by writers like Leon Denis, Arthur Conan Doyle, Camille Flammarion, Ernesto Bozzano, Chico Xavier, Divaldo Pereira Franco, Waldo Vieira, Johannes Greber, and others.

Spiritism has adherents in many countries throughout the world, including Spain, United States, Canada, Japan, Germany, France, England, Argentina, Portugal, and especially Brazil, which has the largest proportion and greatest number of followers.

=== Scientific view ===
The physician John Ferriar wrote "An Essay Towards a Theory of Apparitions" in 1813 in which he argued that sightings of ghosts were the result of optical illusions. Later the French physician Alexandre Jacques François Brière de Boismont published On Hallucinations: Or, the Rational History of Apparitions, Dreams, Ecstasy, Magnetism, and Somnambulism in 1845 in which he claimed sightings of ghosts were the result of hallucinations.

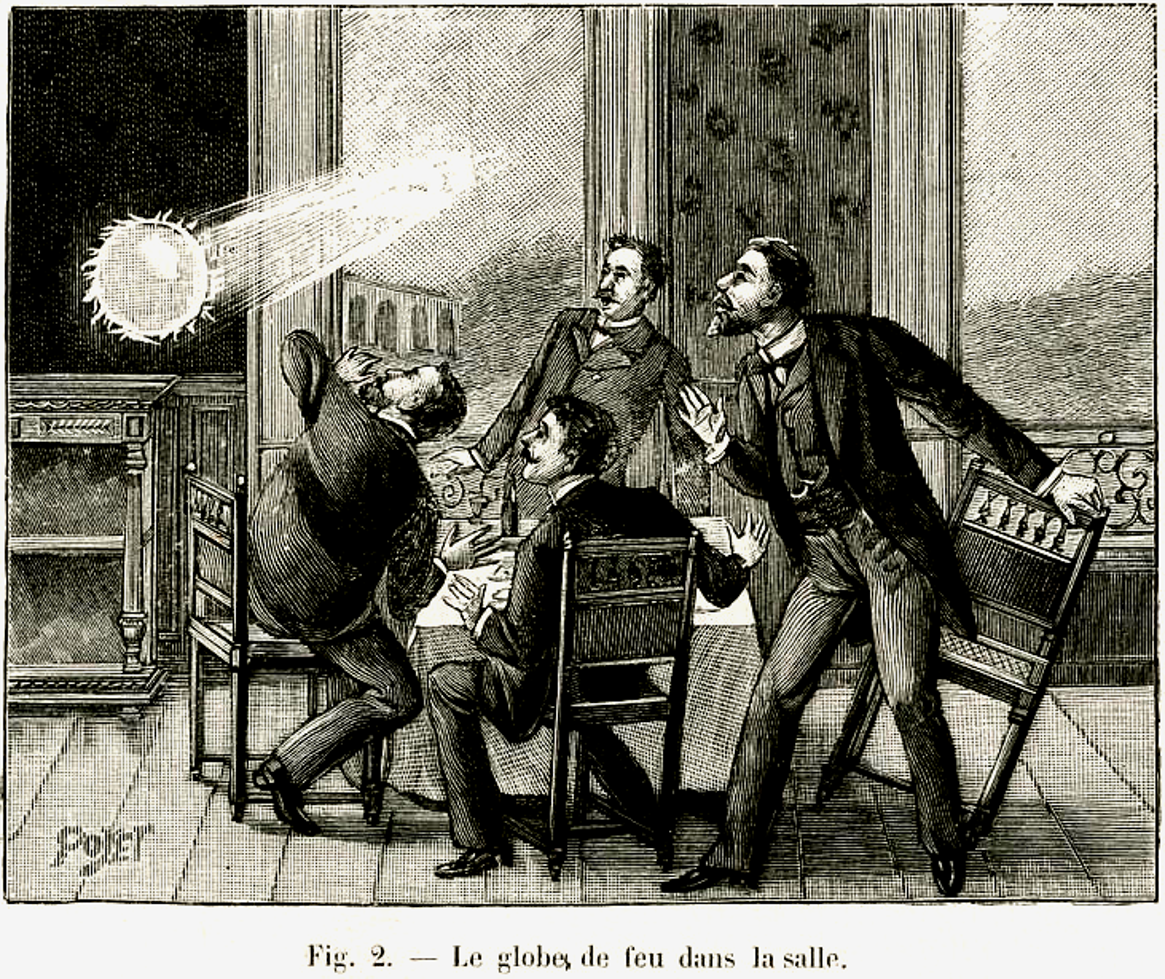
A 1901 depiction of ball lightning

David Turner, a retired physical chemist, suggested that ball lightning could cause inanimate objects to move erratically.

Joe Nickell of the Committee for Skeptical Inquiry wrote that there was no credible scientific evidence that any location was inhabited by spirits of the dead. Limitations of human perception and ordinary physical explanations can account for ghost sightings; for example, air pressure changes in a home causing doors to slam, humidity changes causing boards to creak, condensation in electrical connections causing intermittent behavior, or lights from a passing car reflected through a window at night. Pareidolia, an innate tendency to recognize patterns in random perceptions, is what some skeptics believe causes people to believe that they have 'seen ghosts'. Reports of ghosts "seen out of the corner of the eye" may be accounted for by the sensitivity of human peripheral vision. According to Nickell, peripheral vision can easily mislead, especially late at night when the brain is tired and more likely to misinterpret sights and sounds. Nickell further states, "science cannot substantiate the existence of a 'life energy' that could survive death without dissipating or function at all without a brain... why would... clothes survive?'" He asks, if ghosts glide, then why do people claim to hear them with "heavy footfalls"? Nickell says that ghosts act the same way as "dreams, memories, and imaginings, because they too are mental creations. They are evidence – not of another world, but of this real and natural one."

Benjamin Radford from the Committee for Skeptical Inquiry and author of the 2017 book Investigating Ghosts: The Scientific Search for Spirits writes that "ghost hunting is the world's most popular paranormal pursuit" yet, to date, ghost hunters cannot agree on what a ghost is, or offer proof that they exist; "it's all speculation and guesswork". He writes that it would be "useful and important to distinguish between types of spirits and apparitions. Until then it's merely a parlor game distracting amateur ghost hunters from the task at hand."

According to research in anomalistic psychology visions of ghosts may arise from hypnagogic hallucinations ("waking dreams" experienced in the transitional states to and from sleep). A study of two experiments into alleged hauntings (Wiseman et al.. 2003) came to the conclusion "that people consistently report unusual experiences in 'haunted' areas because of environmental factors, which may differ across locations." Some of these factors included "the variance of local magnetic fields, size of location and lighting level stimuli of which witnesses may not be consciously aware".

Some researchers, such as Michael Persinger of Laurentian University, Canada, have speculated that changes in geomagnetic fields (created, e.g., by tectonic stresses in the Earth's crust or solar activity) could stimulate the brain's temporal lobes and produce many of the experiences associated with hauntings. Sound is thought to be another cause of supposed sightings. Richard Lord and Richard Wiseman have concluded that infrasound can cause humans to experience bizarre feelings in a room, such as anxiety, extreme sorrow, a feeling of being watched, or even the chills. Carbon monoxide poisoning, which can cause changes in perception of the visual and auditory systems, was speculated upon as a possible explanation for haunted houses as early as 1921.

People who experience sleep paralysis often report seeing ghosts during their experiences. Neuroscientists Baland Jalal and V.S. Ramachandran have recently proposed neurological theories for why people hallucinate ghosts during sleep paralysis. Their theories emphasize the role of the parietal lobe and mirror neurons in triggering such ghostly hallucinations.

== By religion ==
=== Judaism ===
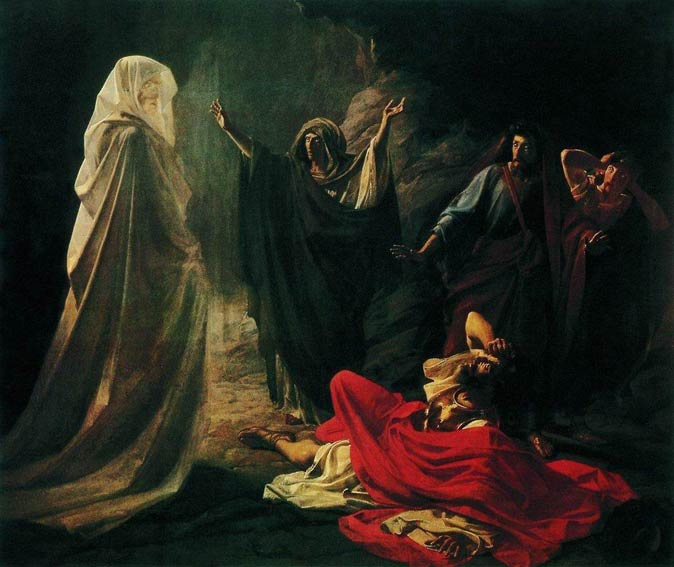
Witch of Endor by Nikolai Ge, depicting King Saul encountering the ghost of Samuel (1857)

The Hebrew Bible contains several references to owb (Hebrew: אוֹב), which are in a few places akin to shades of classical mythology but mostly describing mediums in connection with necromancy and spirit-consulting, which are grouped with witchcraft and other forms of divination under the category of forbidden occult activities. The most notable reference to a shade is in the First Book of Samuel, in which a disguised King Saul has the Witch of Endor conduct a seance to summon the dead prophet Samuel. A similar term appearing throughout the scriptures is repha'(im) (Hebrew: רְפָאִים), which while describing the race of "giants" formerly inhabiting Canaan in many verses, also refer to (the spirits of) dead ancestors of Sheol (like shades) in many others such as in the Book of Isaiah.

Jewish mythology and folkloric traditions describe dybbuks, malicious possessing spirits believed to be the dislocated soul of a dead person. However, the term does not appear in the Kabbalah or Talmudic literature, where it is rather called an "unclean spirit" or ru'aḥ tumah (Hebrew: רוּחַ טוּמְאָה). It supposedly leaves the host body once it has accomplished its goal, sometimes after being helped.

=== Christianity ===
In the New Testament, Jesus has to persuade the Disciples that he is not a ghost following the resurrection, Luke 24:37–39 (some versions of the Bible, such as the KJV and NKJV, use the term "spirit"). Similarly, Jesus' followers at first believe he is a ghost (spirit) when they see him walking on water.

The Catholic Church does not teach definitively about ghosts, though they are commonly believed to be souls from Purgatory, wherein God would allow the souls in this state to return to earth to request prayers for their sake or warn the living of the need for repentance. Mystical visions of Jesus, Mary (Marian apparitions), and other saints in Heaven are also reported.

Lutheranism teaches that ghosts exist, though they do not roam the earth; rather the souls of the dead "continue living, waiting for the resurrection when our souls will be reunited to our bodies." A number of what appear to be ghosts are actually demons in disguise, who the Church teaches, in accordance with I Timothy 4:1, that they "come to deceive people and draw them away from God and into bondage." As a result, attempts to contact the dead may lead to unwanted contact with a demon or an unclean spirit, as was said to occur in the case of Robbie Mannheim, a fourteen-year-old Maryland youth.

Some Christians, especially those of the Restorationist traditions, hold a theological disbelief in ghosts. The Seventh-Day Adventist view is that a "soul" is not equivalent to "spirit" or "ghost" (depending on the translation), and that save for the Holy Spirit, all spirits or ghosts are demons in disguise. Furthermore, they teach that in accordance with Scriptures such as Genesis 2:7 and Ecclesiastes 12:7, there are only two components to a "soul", neither of which survives death, with each returning to its respective source. Christadelphians and Jehovah's Witnesses reject the view of a living, conscious soul after death.

=== Islam ===
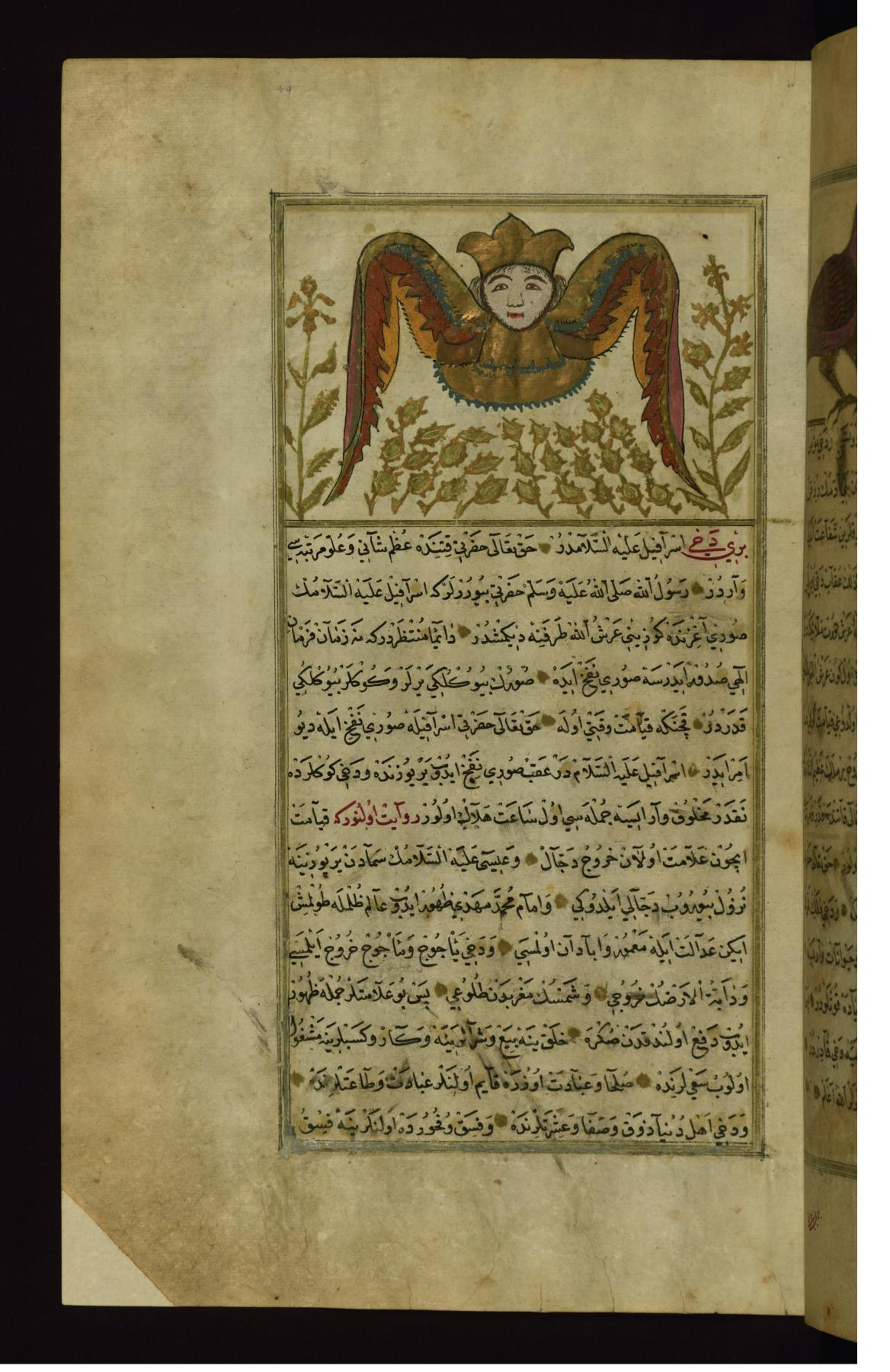
Muhammad ibn Muhammad Shakir Ruzmah-'i Nathani — A Soul Symbolized as an Angel

Rūḥ (Arabic: روح; plural arwah) is a person's immortal, essential self — pneuma, i.e. the "spirit" or "soul". The term is also used for ghosts. The souls of the deceased dwell in barzakh. Only a barrier in Quran, in Islamic tradition this refers to an entire intermediary world between the living and the afterlife. The world, especially cemeteries, are perforated with several gateways to the otherworld or barzakh. In rare occasions, the dead can appear to the living.

Pure souls, such as the souls of saints, are commonly addressed as rūḥ, while impure souls seeking for revenge, are often addressed as afarit. An inappropriate burial can also cause a soul to stay in this world, whereupon roaming the earth as a ghost. Other souls are cursed by God to roam the earth restlessly. Since the just souls remain close to their tomb, some people try to communicate with them in order to gain hidden knowledge. Contact with the dead is not the same as contact with jinn, who alike could provide knowledge concealed from living humans. Many encounters with ghosts are related to dreams supposed to occur in the realm of symbols.

Muslim authors, like Ghazali, Ibn Qayyim and Suyuti wrote in more details about the life of ghosts. Ibn Qayyim and Suyuti assert that when a soul desires to turn back to earth long enough, it is gradually released from restrictions of Barzakh and able to move freely. Each spirit experiences afterlife in accordance with their deeds and conditions in the earthly life. Evil souls will find the afterlife as painful and punishing, imprisoned until God allows them to interact with others. Good souls are not restricted. They are free to come visit other souls and even come down to lower regions. The higher planes (ʿilliyyīn) are considered to be broader than the lower ones, the lowest being the most narrow (sijjīn). The spiritual space is not thought as spatial, but reflects the capacity of the spirit. The more pure the spirit gets, the more it is able to interact with other souls and thus reaches a broader degree of freedom.

The Ismailite Philosopher Nasir Khusraw conjectured that evil human souls turn into demons, when their bodies die, because of their intense attachment to the bodily world. They were worse than the jinn and fairies, who in turn could become devils, if they pursue evil. A similar thought is recorded by Muhammad ibn Zakariya al-Razi.

The ghosts of saints are thought to transmit blessings from God through the heavenly realm to whose who visit their graves. Therefore, visiting the graves of saints and prophets became a major ritual in Muslim spirituality.

=== Hinduism ===
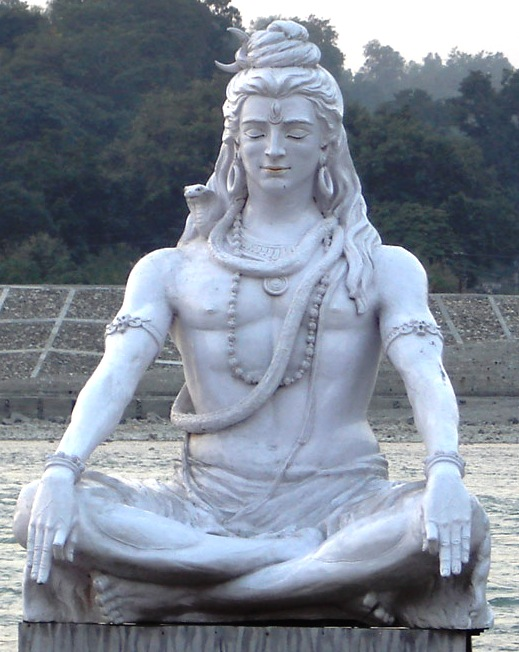
Hindu deity Shiva is known as the god of ghosts

A bhoota is the ghost of a deceased being in Indian religions. Interpretations of how bhootas come into existence vary by region and community, but they are usually considered to be perturbed and restless due to some factor that prevents them from moving on (to transmigration, non-being, nirvana, or swarga or naraka, depending on tradition). This could be a violent death, unsettled matters in their lives, or simply the failure of their survivors to perform proper funerals. Belief in ghosts has been deeply ingrained in the minds of the people of the subcontinent for generations. There are many allegedly haunted places in the subcontinent, such as cremation grounds, dilapidated buildings, royal mansions, havelis, forts, forest bungalows, burning ghats, etc. Ghosts also occupy a significant place in the Bengali culture. Ghosts and various supernatural entities form an integral part of the socio-cultural beliefs of both the Muslim and Hindu communities of Bangladesh and the Indian state of West Bengal.

The Bhutas (singular 'Bhuta'), spirits of deified heroes, of fierce and evil beings, of Hindu deities and of animals, etc., are wrongly referred to as "ghosts" or "demons" and, in fact, are protective and benevolent beings. Though it is true that they can cause harm in their violent forms, as they are extremely powerful, they can be pacified through worship or offerings referred to as Bhuta Aradhana.

The Churel, also spelled as Charail, Churreyl, Chudail, Chudel, Chuṛail, Cuḍail or Cuḍel (Hindi: चुड़ैल, Urdu: چڑیل), is a mythical spirit of a woman who died during pregnancy or childbirth, which may be a demoniacal revenant said to occur in South Asia and Southeast Asia, particularly popular in India, Bangladesh, Nepal and Pakistan. The churel is typically described as "the ghost of an unpurified living thing", but because she is often said to latch on to trees, she is also called a tree-spirit. According to some legends, a woman who dies during childbirth or pregnancy or from suffering at the hands of her in-laws will come back as a revenant churel for revenge, particularly targeting the males in her family.

The churel is mostly described as extremely ugly and hideous but is able to shape-shift and disguise herself as a beautiful woman to lure men into the woods or mountains where she either kills them or sucks up their life-force or virility, turning them into old men. Their feet are believed to be turned the other way around, so the toes face the direction of their back. The churel is called as Pichal Peri in Punjab and Khyber Pakhtunkhwa.

There are many folk remedies and folkloric sayings that elaborate on how to get rid of revenant, bhoot and churels, and a number measures that supposedly prevent churels from coming to life. The family of a woman who dies a traumatic, tragic, or unnatural death might perform special rituals fearing that the victimised woman might return as a churel. The corpses of suspected churels are also buried in a particular method and posture so as to prevent her from returning.

=== Buddhism ===
In Buddhism, there are a number of planes of existence into which a person can be reborn, one of which is the realm of hungry ghosts. Buddhist celebrate the Ghost Festival as an expression of compassion, one of Buddhist virtues. If the hungry ghosts are fed by non-relatives, they would not bother the community.

== By culture ==
=== African folklore ===
For the Igbo people, a man is simultaneously a physical and spiritual entity. However, it is his spirited dimension that is eternal. The Akan people witness five parts of the human personality: the Nipadua (body), the Okra (soul), Sunsum (spirit), Ntoro (character from father), Mogya (character from mother). The Humr people of southwestern Kordofan, Sudan consume the drink Umm Nyolokh, which is prepared from the liver and bone marrow of giraffes. Richard Rudgley hypothesises that Umm Nyolokh may contain DMT and certain online websites further theorise that giraffe liver might owe its putative psychoactivity to substances derived from psychoactive plants, such as Acacia spp. consumed by the animal. The drink is said to cause hallucinations of giraffes, believed by the Humr to be the ghosts of giraffes.

=== European folklore ===
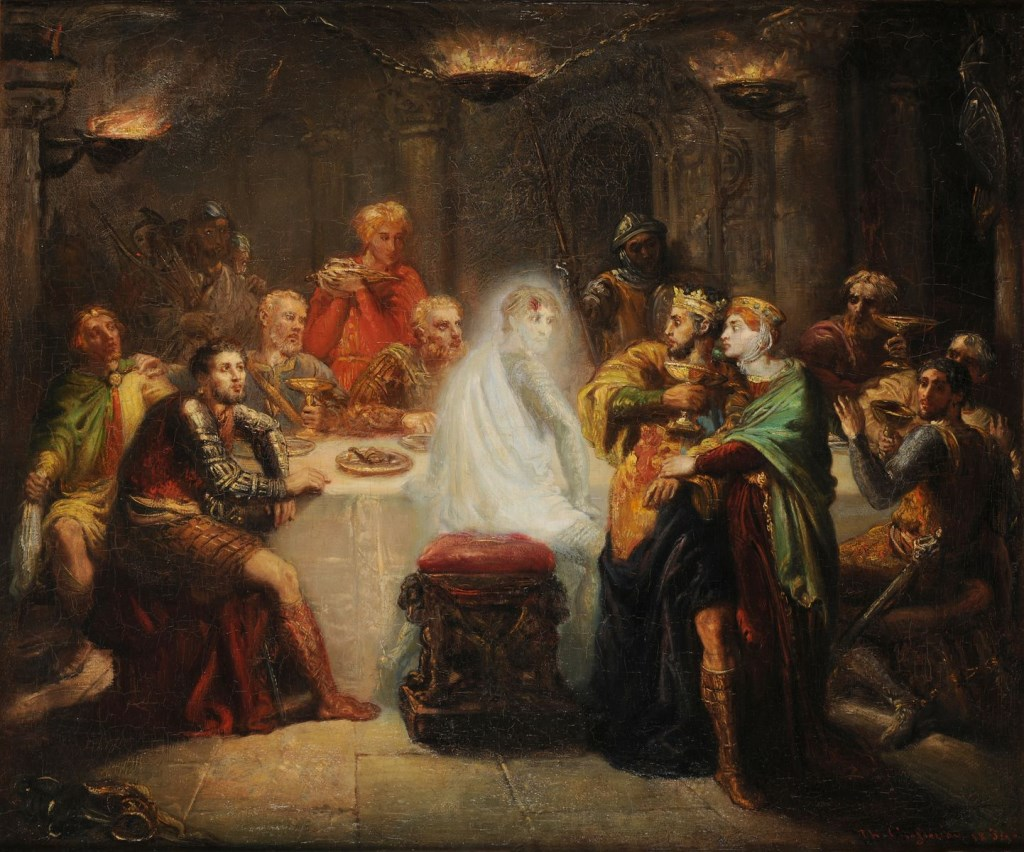
Banquo's Ghost by Théodore Chassériau, 1855

Belief in ghosts in European folklore is characterized by the recurring fear of "returning" or revenant deceased who may harm the living. This includes the Scandinavian gjenganger, the Romanian strigoi, the Serbian vampir, the Greek vrykolakas, etc. In Scandinavian and Finnish tradition, ghosts appear in corporeal form, and their supernatural nature is given away by behavior rather than appearance. In fact, in many stories they are first mistaken for the living. They may be mute, appear and disappear suddenly, or leave no footprints or other traces. British folklore is particularly notable for its numerous haunted locations.

=== South and Southeast Asia ===
==== Indian subcontinent ====
A bhoot or bhut (Hindi: भूत, Gujarati: ભૂત, Urdu: بهوت, Bengali: ভূত, Odia: ଭୂତ) is a supernatural creature, usually the ghost of a deceased person, in the popular culture, literature and some ancient texts of the Indian subcontinent.

===== North India =====
Interpretations of how bhoots come into existence vary by region and community, but they are usually considered to be perturbed and restless due to some factor that prevents them from moving on (to transmigration, non-being, nirvana, or heaven or hell, depending on tradition). This could be a violent death, unsettled matters in their lives, or simply the failure of their survivors to perform proper funerals.

In Central and Northern India, ojha or spirit guides play a central role. It duly happens when in the night someone sleeps and decorates something on the wall, and they say that if one sees the spirit the next thing in the morning he will become a spirit too, and that to a headless spirit and the soul of the body will remain the dark with the dark lord from the spirits who reside in the body of every human in Central and Northern India. It is also believed that if someone calls one from behind, never turn back and see because the spirit may catch the human to make it a spirit. Other types of spirits in Hindu mythology include Baital, an evil spirit who haunts cemeteries and takes demonic possession of corpses, and Pishacha, a type of flesh-eating demon.

===== Bengal and East India =====
There are many kinds of ghosts and similar supernatural entities that frequently come up in Bengali culture, where it forms an important part in Bengali peoples' socio-cultural beliefs and superstitions. It is believed that the spirits of those who cannot find peace in the afterlife or die unnatural deaths remain on Earth. The word Pret (from Sanskrit) is also used in Bengali to mean ghost. In Bengal, ghosts are believed to be the spirit after death of an unsatisfied human being or a soul of a person who dies in unnatural or abnormal circumstances (like murder, suicide or accident). Even it is believed that other animals and creatures can also be turned into ghost after their death.

==== Thailand ====
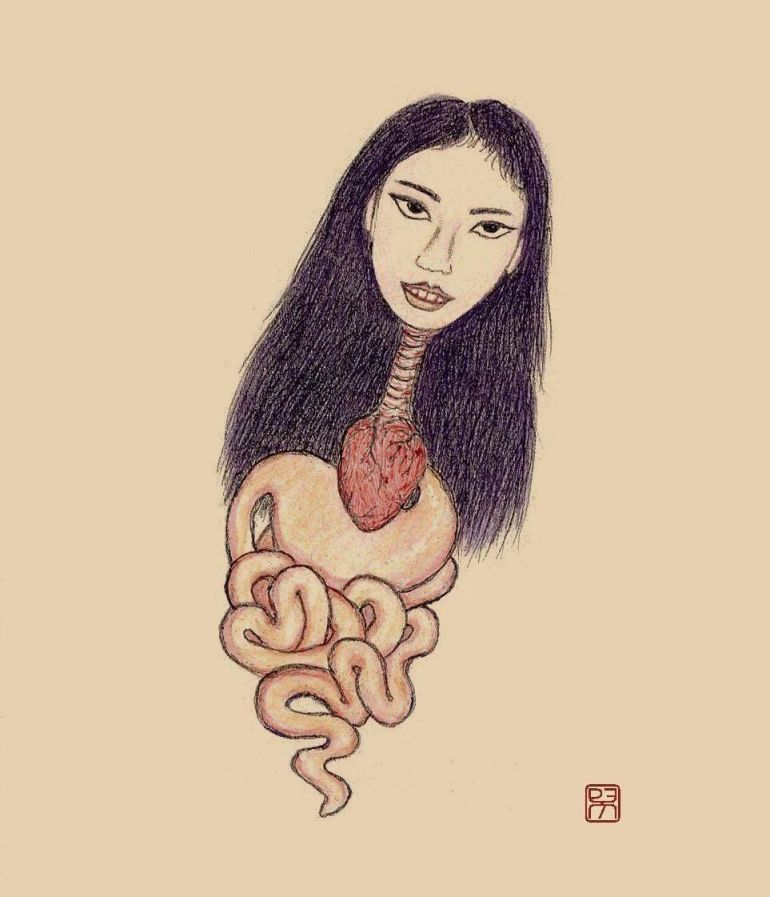
Krasue, a Thai female ghost known as Ap in Khmer

Ghosts in Thailand are part of local folklore and have now become part of the popular culture of the country. Phraya Anuman Rajadhon was the first Thai scholar who seriously studied Thai folk beliefs and took notes on the nocturnal village spirits of Thailand. He established that, since such spirits were not represented in paintings or drawings, they were purely based on descriptions of popular orally transmitted traditional stories. Therefore, most of the contemporary iconography of ghosts such as Nang Tani, Nang Takian, Krasue, Krahang, Phi Hua Kat, Phi Pop, Phi Phong, Phi Phraya, and Mae Nak has its origins in Thai films that have now become classics. The most feared spirit in Thailand is Phi Tai Hong, the ghost of a person who has died suddenly of a violent death. The folklore of Thailand also includes the belief that sleep paralysis is caused by a ghost, Phi Am.

==== Tibet ====
There is widespread belief in ghosts in Tibetan culture. Ghosts are explicitly recognized in the Tibetan Buddhist religion as they were in Indian Buddhism, occupying a distinct but overlapping world to the human one, and feature in many traditional legends. When a human dies, after a period of uncertainty they may enter the ghost world. A hungry ghost (Tibetan: yidag, yi-dvags; Sanskrit: प्रेत, romanized: preta) has a tiny throat and huge stomach, and so can never be satisfied. Ghosts may be killed with a ritual dagger or caught in a spirit trap and burnt, thus releasing them to be reborn. Ghosts may also be exorcised, and an annual festival is held throughout Tibet for this purpose. Some say that Dorje Shugden, the ghost of a powerful 17th-century monk, is a deity, but the Dalai Lama asserts that he is an evil spirit, which has caused a split in the Tibetan exile community.

==== Austronesia ====
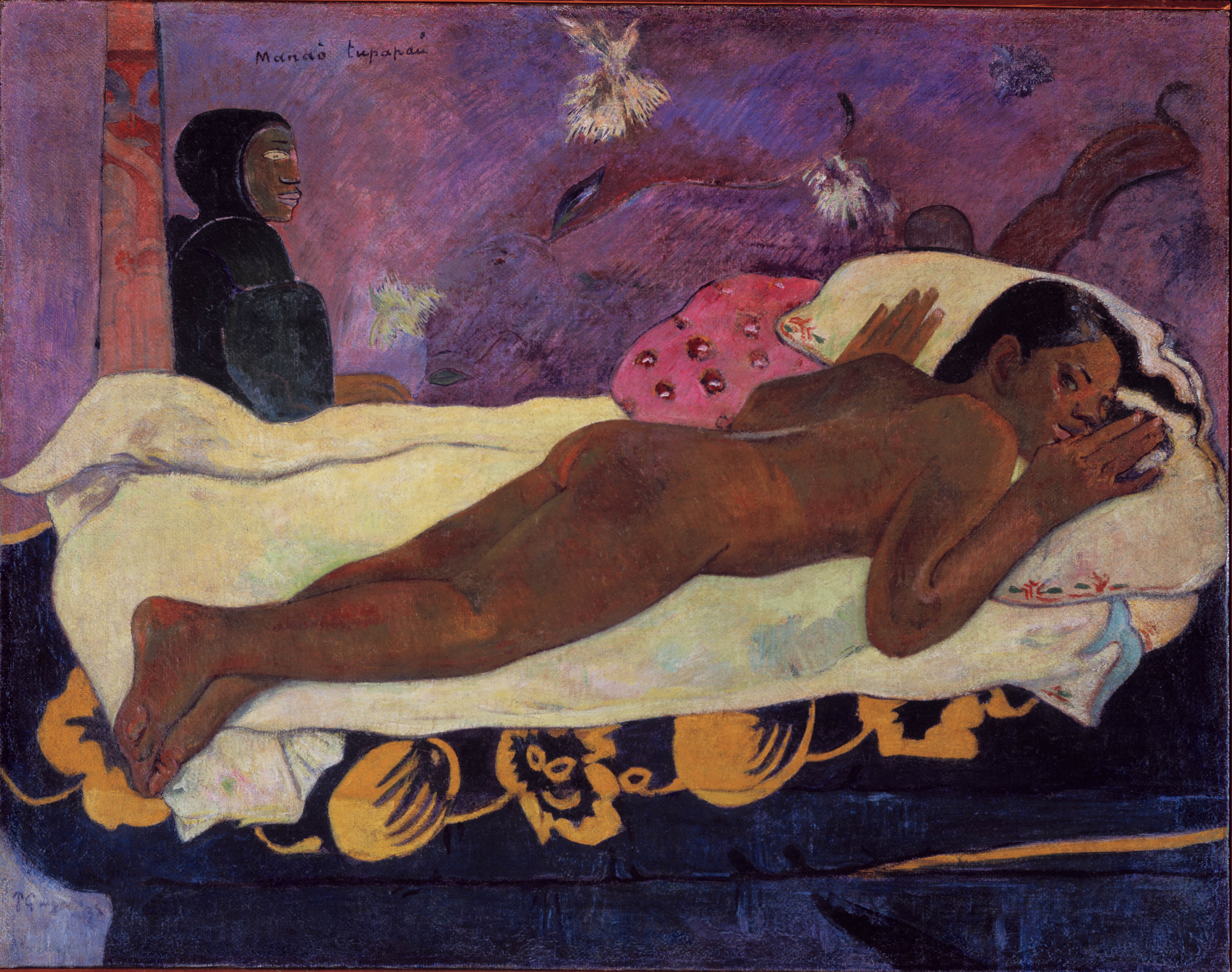
Spirit of the Dead Watching by Paul Gauguin (1892)

There are many Malay ghost myths, remnants of old animist beliefs that have been shaped by later Hindu, Buddhist, and Muslim influences in the modern states of Indonesia, Malaysia, and Brunei. Some ghost concepts such as the female vampires Pontianak and Penanggalan are shared throughout the region. Ghosts are a popular theme in modern Malaysian and Indonesian films. There are also many references to ghosts in Filipino culture, ranging from ancient legendary creatures such as the Manananggal and Tiyanak to more modern urban legends and horror films. The beliefs, legends and stories are as diverse as the people of the Philippines.

There was widespread belief in ghosts in Polynesian culture, some of which persists today. After death, a person's ghost normally traveled to the sky world or the underworld, but some could stay on earth. In many Polynesian legends, ghosts were often actively involved in the affairs of the living. Ghosts might also cause sickness or even invade the body of ordinary people, to be driven out through strong medicines.

=== East and Central Asia ===
==== China ====
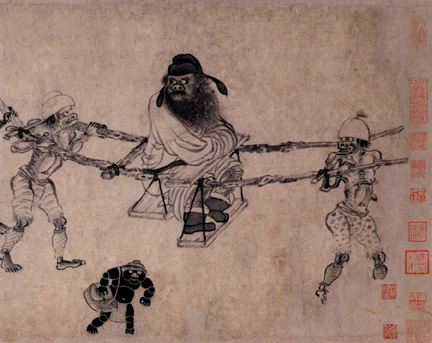
An image of Zhong Kui, the vanquisher of ghosts and evil beings, painted sometime before 1304 AD by Gong Kai

There are many references to ghosts in Chinese culture. Even Confucius said, "Respect ghosts and gods, but keep away from them."

The ghosts take many forms, depending on how the person died, and are often harmful. Many Chinese ghost beliefs have been accepted by neighboring cultures, notably Japan and southeast Asia. Ghost beliefs are closely associated with traditional Chinese religion based on ancestor worship, many of which were incorporated in Taoism. Later beliefs were influenced by Buddhism, and in turn influenced and created uniquely Chinese Buddhist beliefs.

Many Chinese today believe it possible to contact the spirits of their ancestors through a medium, and that ancestors can help descendants if properly respected and rewarded. The annual ghost festival is celebrated by Chinese around the world. On this day, ghosts and spirits, including those of the deceased ancestors, come out from the lower realm. Ghosts are described in classical Chinese texts as well as modern literature and films.

An article in the China Post stated that nearly 87 percent of Chinese office workers believe in ghosts, and some 52 percent of workers will wear hand art, necklaces, crosses, or even place a crystal ball on their desks to keep ghosts at bay, according to the poll. The prevalence of belief is such that the ruling party has actively sought to discourage citizens.

==== Japan ====
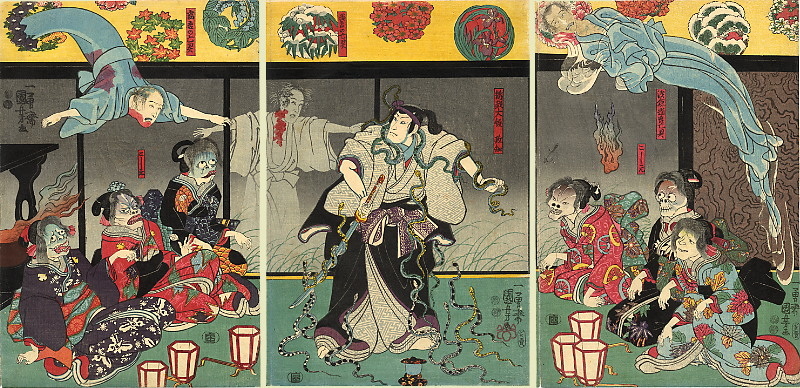
Utagawa Kuniyoshi, The Ghosts, c. 1850

Yūrei (幽霊) are figures in Japanese folklore, analogous to Western legends of ghosts. The name consists of two kanji, 幽 (yū), meaning "faint" or "dim", and 霊 (rei), meaning "soul" or "spirit". Alternative names include bōrei (亡霊) meaning ruined or departed spirit, shiryō (死霊) meaning dead spirit, or the more encompassing yōkai (妖怪) or obake (お化け).

Like their Chinese and Western counterparts, they are thought to be spirits kept from a peaceful afterlife.

=== Americas ===
==== Mexico ====
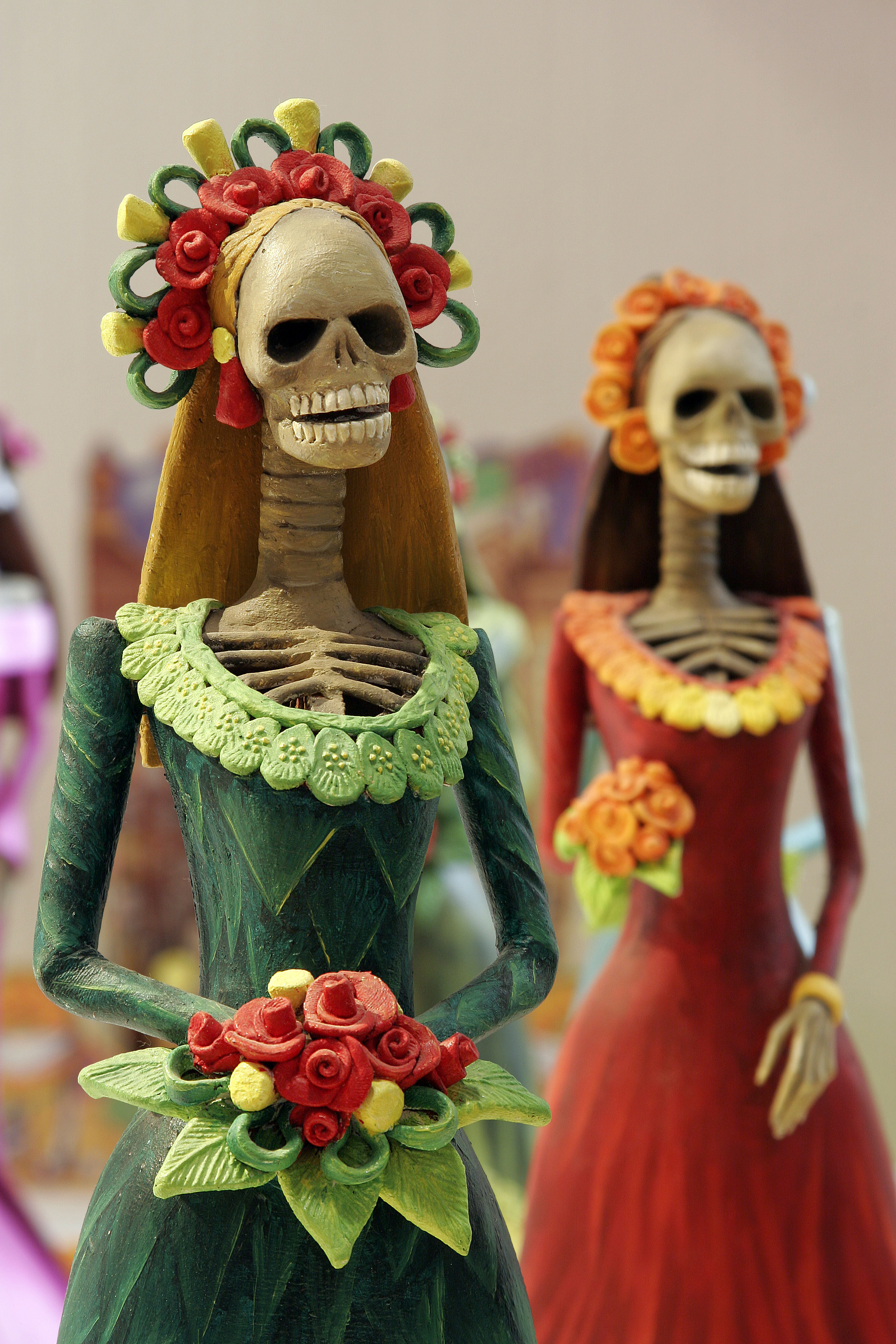
Catrinas, one of the most popular figures of the Day of the Dead celebrations in Mexico

There is extensive and varied belief in ghosts in Mexican culture. The modern state of Mexico before the Spanish conquest was inhabited by diverse peoples such as the Maya and Aztec, and their beliefs have survived and evolved, combined with the beliefs of the Spanish colonists. The Day of the Dead incorporates pre-Columbian beliefs with Christian elements. Mexican literature and films include many stories of ghosts interacting with the living.

==== United States ====
According to the Gallup Poll News Service, belief in haunted houses, ghosts, communication with the dead, and witches had an especially steep increase over the 1990s. A 2005 Gallup poll found that about 32 percent of Americans believe in ghosts.

== Depiction in the arts ==
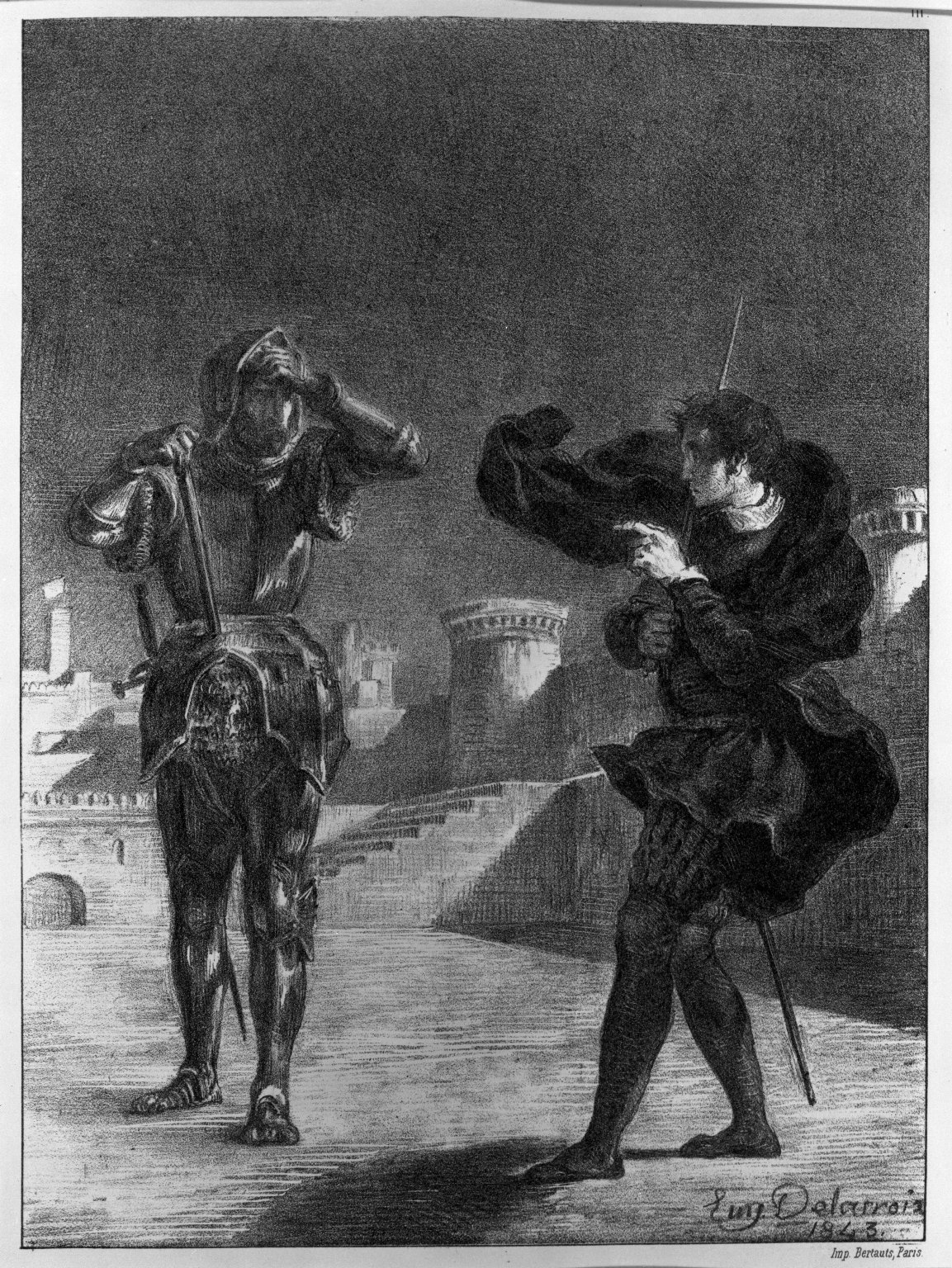
The Phantom on the Terrace from Shakespeare's Hamlet (engraving by Eugène Delacroix, 1843)

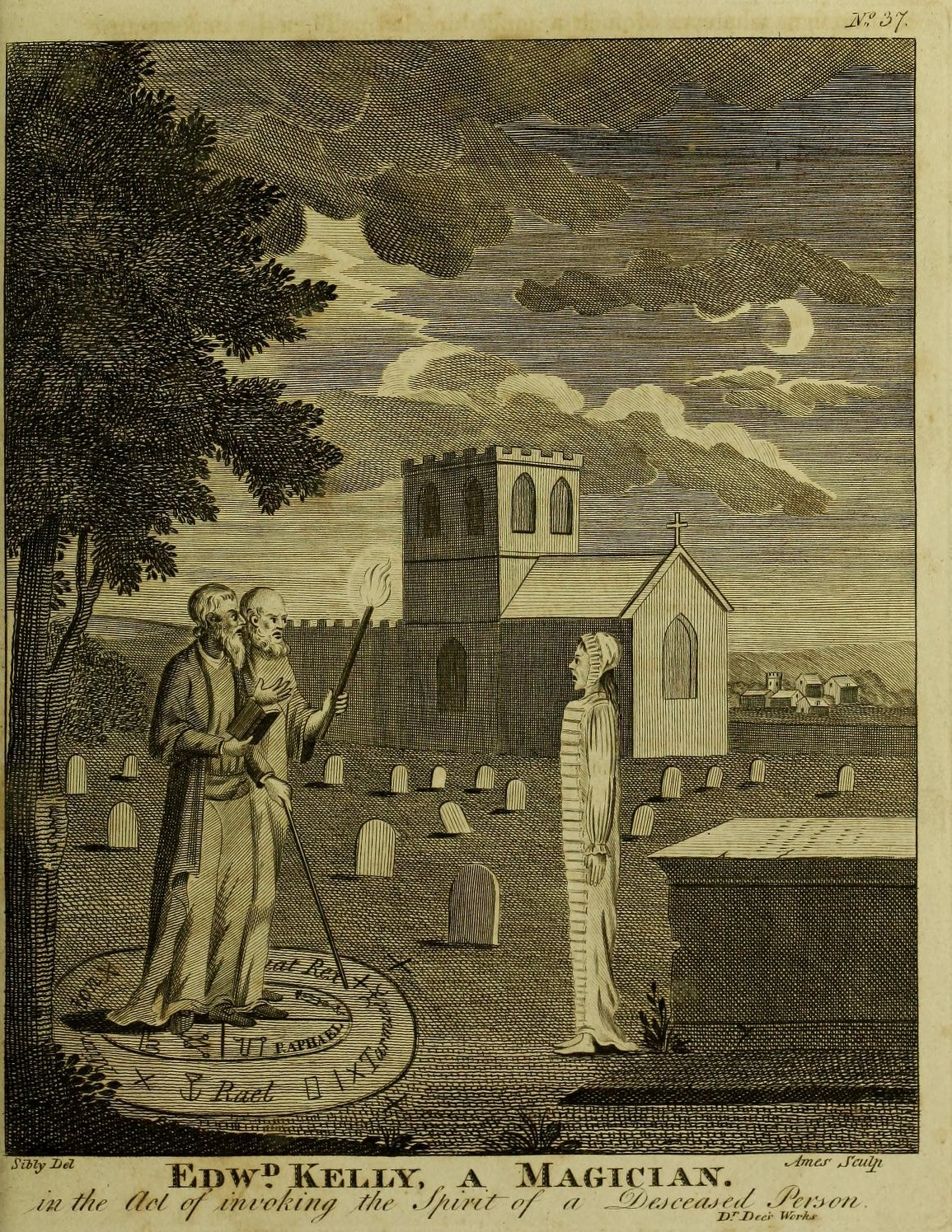
John Dee and Edward Kelley invoking the spirit of a deceased person (engraving from the Astrology by Ebenezer Sibly, 1806)

Ghosts are prominent in story-telling of various nations. The ghost story is ubiquitous across all cultures from oral folktales to works of literature. While ghost stories are often explicitly meant to be scary, they have been written to serve all sorts of purposes, from comedy to morality tales. Ghosts often appear in the narrative as sentinels or prophets of things to come. Belief in ghosts is found in all cultures around the world, and thus ghost stories may be passed down orally or in written form.

Spirits of the dead appear in literature as early as Homer's Odyssey, which features a journey to the underworld and the hero encountering the ghosts of the dead, and the Old Testament, in which the Witch of Endor summons the spirit of the prophet Samuel.

=== Renaissance to Romanticism (1500 to 1840) ===
One of the more recognizable ghosts in English literature is the shade of Hamlet's murdered father in Shakespeare's The Tragical History of Hamlet, Prince of Denmark. In Hamlet, it is the ghost who demands that Prince Hamlet investigate his "murder most foul" and seek revenge upon his usurping uncle, King Claudius.

In English Renaissance theater, ghosts were often depicted in the garb of the living and even in armor, as with the ghost of Hamlet's father. Armor, being out-of-date by the time of the Renaissance, gave the stage ghost a sense of antiquity. But the sheeted ghost began to gain ground on stage in the 19th century because an armored ghost could not satisfactorily convey the requisite spookiness: it clanked and creaked, and had to be moved about by complicated pulley systems or elevators. These clanking ghosts being hoisted about the stage became objects of ridicule as they became clichéd stage elements. Ann Jones and Peter Stallybrass, in Renaissance Clothing and the Materials of Memory, point out, "In fact, it is as laughter increasingly threatens the Ghost that he starts to be staged not in armor but in some form of 'spirit drapery'."

=== Victorian/Edwardian (1840 to 1920) ===
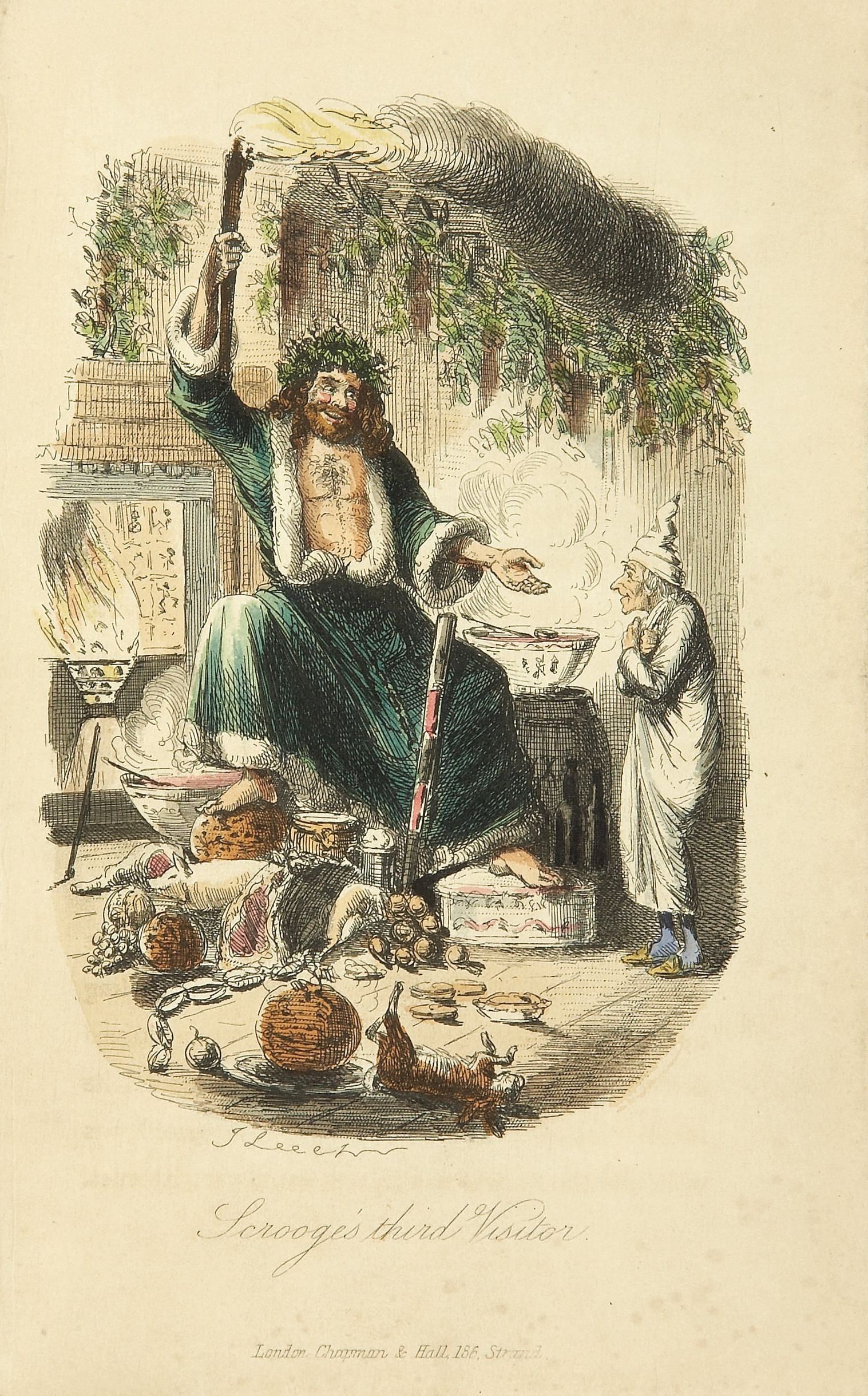
Ghost of Christmas Present from Charles Dickens' novella A Christmas Carol (1843)

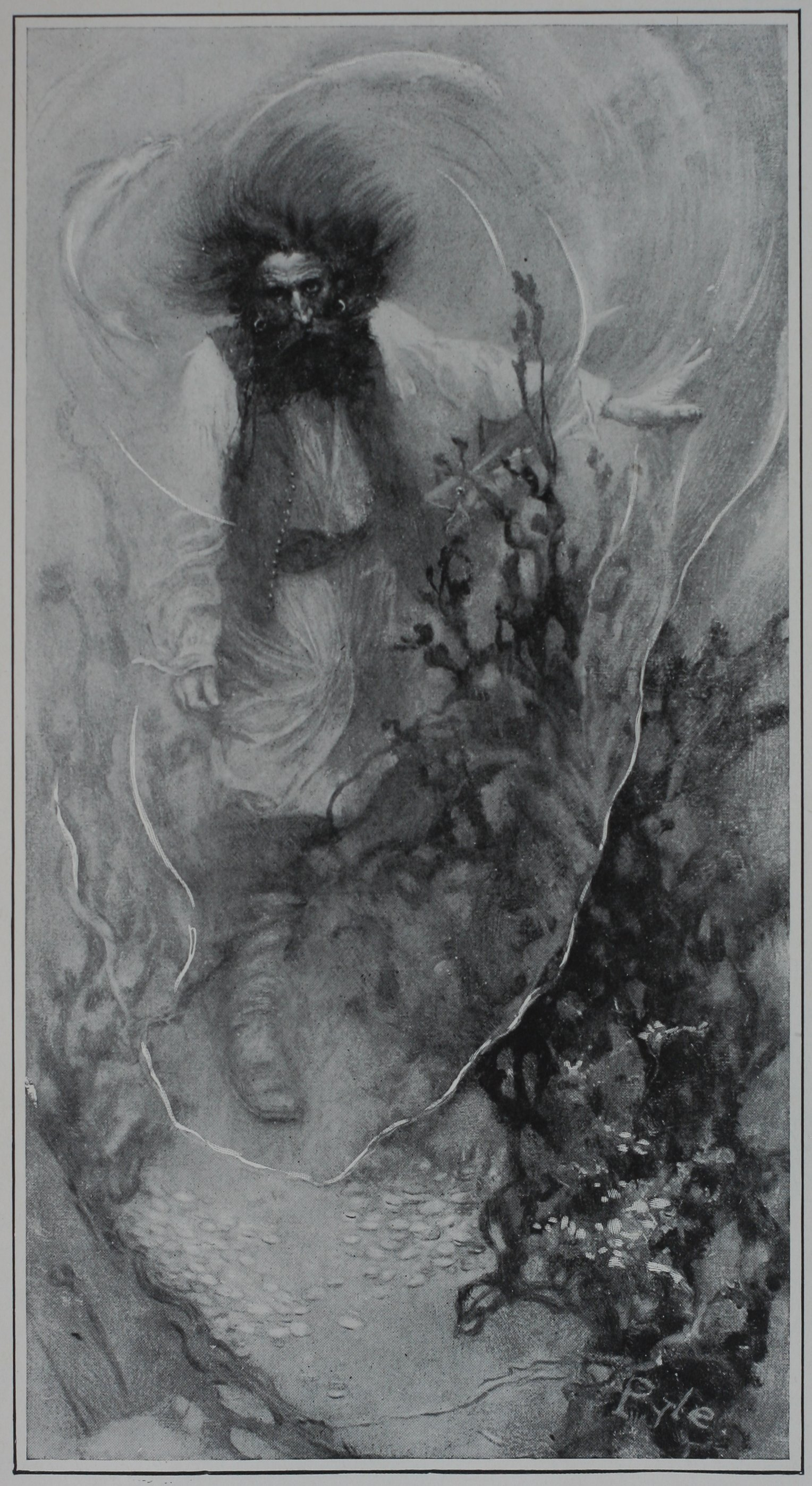
The ghost of a pirate, from Howard Pyle's Book of Pirates (1903)

The "classic" ghost story arose during the Victorian period, and included authors such as M. R. James, Sheridan Le Fanu, Violet Hunt, and Henry James. Classic ghost stories were influenced by the gothic fiction tradition, and contain elements of folklore and psychology. M. R. James summed up the essential elements of a ghost story as, "Malevolence and terror, the glare of evil faces, 'the stony grin of unearthly malice', pursuing forms in darkness, and 'long-drawn, distant screams', are all in place, and so is a modicum of blood, shed with deliberation and carefully husbanded...". One of the key early appearances by ghosts was The Castle of Otranto by Horace Walpole in 1764, considered to be the first gothic novel.

Famous literary apparitions from this period are the ghosts of A Christmas Carol, in which Ebenezer Scrooge is helped to see the error of his ways by the ghost of his former colleague Jacob Marley, and the ghosts of Christmas Past, Christmas Present, and Christmas Yet to Come.

=== Modern era (1920 to 1970) ===
Brown Lady of Raynham Hall, a claimed ghost photograph by Captain Hubert C. Provand. First published in Country Life magazine, 1936

Professional parapsychologists and "ghosts hunters", such as Harry Price, active in the 1920s and 1930s, and Peter Underwood, active in the 1940s and 1950s, published accounts of their experiences with ostensibly true ghost stories such as Price's The Most Haunted House in England, and Underwood's Ghosts of Borley (both recounting experiences at Borley Rectory). The writer Frank Edwards delved into ghost stories in books of his such as Stranger than Science.

Children's benevolent ghost stories became popular, such as Casper the Friendly Ghost, created in the 1930s and appearing in comics, animated cartoons, and eventually a 1995 feature film. With the advent of motion pictures and television, screen depictions of ghosts became common, and spanned a variety of genres; the works of Shakespeare, Dickens and Wilde have all been made into cinematic versions. Novel-length tales have been difficult to adapt to cinema, although that of The Haunting of Hill House to The Haunting in 1963 is an exception.

With the advent of motion pictures and television, screen depictions of ghosts became common, and spanned a variety of genres; the works of Shakespeare, Dickens and Wilde have all been made into cinematic versions. Novel-length tales have been difficult to adapt to cinema, although that of The Haunting of Hill House to The Haunting in 1963 is an exception.

Sentimental depictions during this period were more popular in cinema than horror, and include the 1947 film The Ghost and Mrs. Muir, which was later adapted to television with a successful 1968–1970 TV series. Genuine psychological horror films from this period include 1944's The Uninvited, and 1945's Dead of Night.

=== Post-modern (1970–present) ===
The 1970s saw screen depictions of ghosts diverge into distinct genres of the romantic and horror. A common theme in the romantic genre from this period is the ghost as a benign guide or messenger, often with unfinished business, such as 1989's Field of Dreams, the 1990 film Ghost, and the 1993 comedy Heart and Souls. In the horror genre, 1980's The Fog, and the A Nightmare on Elm Street series of films from the 1980s and 1990s are notable examples of the trend for the merging of ghost stories with scenes of physical violence.

Popularised in such films as the 1984 comedy Ghostbusters, ghost hunting became a hobby for many who formed ghost hunting societies to explore reportedly haunted places. The ghost hunting theme has been featured in reality television series, such as Ghost Adventures, Ghost Hunters, Ghost Hunters International, Ghost Lab, Most Haunted, and A Haunting. It is also represented in children's television by such programs as The Ghost Hunter and Ghost Trackers. Ghost hunting also gave rise to multiple guidebooks to haunted locations, and ghost hunting "how-to" manuals.

The 1990s saw a return to classic "gothic" ghosts, whose dangers were more psychological than physical. Examples of films from this period include 1999's The Sixth Sense and The Others.

Asian cinema has also produced horror films about ghosts, such as the 1998 Japanese film Ring (remade in the US as The Ring in 2002), and the Pang brothers' 2002 film The Eye. Indian ghost movies are popular not just in India, but in the Middle East, Africa, South East Asia, and other parts of the world. Some Indian ghost movies such as the comedy / horror film Chandramukhi have been commercial successes, dubbed into several languages.

In fictional television programming, ghosts have been explored in series such as Supernatural, Ghost Whisperer, and Medium.

In animated fictional television programming, ghosts have served as the central element in series such as Casper the Friendly Ghost, Danny Phantom, and Scooby-Doo. Various other television shows have depicted ghosts as well.

== Metaphorical usages ==
Nietzsche argued that people generally wear prudent masks in company, but that an alternative strategy for social interaction is to present oneself as an absence, as a social ghost – "One reaches out for us but gets no hold of us" – a sentiment later echoed (if in a less positive way) by Carl Jung.

Nick Harkaway has considered that all people carry a host of ghosts in their heads in the form of impressions of past acquaintances – ghosts who represent mental maps of other people in the world and serve as philosophical reference points.

Object relations theory sees human personalities as formed by splitting off aspects of the person that he or she deems incompatible, whereupon the person may be haunted in later life by such ghosts of his or her alternate selves.

The sense of ghosts as invisible, mysterious entities is invoked in several terms that use the word metaphorically, such as ghostwriter (a writer who pens texts credited to another person without revealing the ghostwriter's role as an author); ghost singer (a vocalist who records songs whose vocals are credited to another person); and "ghosting" a date (when a person breaks off contact with a former romantic partner and disappears).

== See also ==
- Hauntology
- List of ghosts
- Paranormal activity
- Spiritism
- Spirit photography
- Susulu (mythology)
- La Llorona
