= Graham Reid =

Graham Reid may refer to:

- Graham Reid (field hockey) (born 1964), former Australian field hockey player
- Graham Reid (writer) (born 1945), writer from Northern Ireland
- Graham Reid (journalist), New Zealand journalist and music critic

== See also ==
- Graeme Reid (born 1948), field hockey player from Australia
- Graham Reed (disambiguation)
