= John Leiper =

Scottish footballer

Personal information
- Full name: John Leiper
- Date of birth: 26 June 1938 (age 88)
- Place of birth: Aberdeen, Scotland
- Position: Goalkeeper

Senior career*
Years	Team	Apps	(Gls)
1957–1961	Aberdeen East End		
1961–1968	Plymouth Argyle	75	(0)
1968–1970	Chelmsford City	52	(0)
1970–1971	Plymouth City		
- Bodmin Town
- * Club domestic league appearances and goals

John Leiper (born 26 June 1938) is a Scottish former footballer who played as a goalkeeper.

== Career ==
Born in Aberdeen, Leiper began his adult career with local Junior club Aberdeen East End. In 1961, he signed for Plymouth Argyle after being spotted by fellow Aberdonian and ex-Plymouth forward Jimmy Gauld. At Plymouth, Leiper was mainly utilised as a back-up, however he became first choice goalkeeper for the club in the 1965–66 season; a decision that lead to the resignation of manager Malcolm Allison after the club's directors favoured Leiper over Noel Dwyer in goal. Despite playing his last first team game for Plymouth on 27 March 1967, Leiper remained at the club, playing for the reserve team the following season, turning down a move to Bradford City in the process.

In 1968, Leiper signed for Chelmsford City, staying with the club up until the 1969–70 season. Following his time at Chelmsford, Leiper signed for Western League newcomers Plymouth City. In 1971, Leiper joined Bodmin Town.
