= Michael Collins (footballer, born 1938) =

English footballer (1938–2024)

Personal information
- Full name: Michael Joseph Anthony Collins
- Date of birth: 1 February 1938
- Place of birth: Bermondsey, England
- Date of death: 26 March 2024 (aged 86)
- Position: Centre half

Senior career*
Years	Team	Apps	(Gls)
- Wellingborough Town
1955–1962	Luton Town	8	(0)
1962–1963	Chelmsford City	20	(1)
1963–1967	Bedford Town		
1967–1968	Cambridge City		
- Dunstable Town

Managerial career
- Dunstable Town
- * Club domestic league appearances and goals

Michael Joseph Anthony Collins (1 February 1938 — 26 March 2024) was an English professional footballer who played as a centre half.

== Career ==
Born in Bermondsey, Collins moved to Wellingborough as a child, starting his career with Wellingborough Town in the United Counties League.

In March 1955, Collins signed professional forms with Luton Town. Over the course of seven years at Luton, Collins made ten appearances in all competitions, eight in the Football League, before joining Chelmsford City in 1962.

After a single season at Chelmsford, Collins moved on to Bedford Town in June 1963. During his time at Bedford, Collins made 225 appearances in all competitions, scoring once and captained the side between 1964 and 1966. In 1967, after refusing new terms at Bedford, Collins signed for Cambridge City. Collins spent one season at Cambridge City, before signing for Dunstable Town. Following his retirement, Collins became manager of Dunstable.
