= Richard Baerwald =

German academic psychologist

Richard Baerwald (1867–1929) was a German academic psychologist in Berlin. Towards the end of his life he became interested in parapsychology and occultism (as it was interpreted at the period). He edited the Zeitschrift für Kritischen Okkultismus from 1926 to 1928.

== Works ==
- Theorie der Begabung (1896)
- Der Mensch ist grösser als das Schicksal (1922)
- Die intellektuellen Phänomene (1925)
- Okkultismus und Spiritismus und ihre weltanschaulichen Folgerungen (1926)
- Psychologie der Selbstverteidigung in Kampf-, Not- und Krankheitszeiten (1927)
