= Dieter Klaußner =

German footballer

Personal information
- Date of birth: 1 June 1938 (age 87)
- Place of birth: Karlsruhe, Germany
- Position: Defender

Senior career*
Years	Team	Apps	(Gls)
1958–1965	Karlsruher SC		
1965–1973	FC Phönix Bellheim		
- * Club domestic league appearances and goals

Dieter Klaußner (born 1 June 1938) is a German former professional footballer who played as a defender.
