= Graham Reed (psychologist) =

Canadian psychologist

- Born: Graham F. Reed; 1923; England
- Died: 1989 (aged 65–66)
- Education: Manchester University
- Known for: anomalistic psychology, The Psychology of Anomalous Experience
- Scientific career
- Fields: psychology, anomalistic psychology
- Workplaces: York University, Glendon College

Graham F. Reed (1923–1989) was a Canadian psychologist. He is best known for his major work on anomalistic psychology entitled The Psychology of Anomalous Experience (1972), which seeks to better understand the psychology behind seemingly bizarre experiences. He was also a CSI Fellow.

== Background ==
Reed was born and educated in England, and earned a PhD in psychology from Manchester University in 1966. He briefly taught in England and Scotland (University of Aberdeen) before he moved to Canada in 1969 and joined the psychology department as a chairman at Atkinson College, York University. He also served as dean of graduate studies from 1973 to 1981, then chair of the department of psychology at Glendon College from 1982 to 1988, and became a university professor in 1984. He was later recognized for his work in scientific skepticism and became a fellow of the Committee for Skeptical Inquiry.

== The Psychology of Anomalous Experience ==
In The Psychology of Anomalous Experience, Reed strives to make distinctions in the various types of anomalous experiences and covers experiences such as hallucinations, pseudologia phantastica, fugue states and koro.

John Cohen reviewed this work positively in 1973, describing it as "witty", "light", and "gay", while also noting that it is instructive and could be useful and interesting to lay people and students alike. He wrote that the book describes what an anomalous experience is actually like for the person who experiences it. In an excerpt, Reed describes what he sees to be a problem with diagnosing pseudologia phantastica:

It is ironic to realize that the term "pseudologia phantastica" is applied generally to the behaviour of patients merely because their reports are demonstrably untrue. There must be many people who are not under psychiatric treatment because their reports have not been recognized as untrue. Hysterics are notorious for their histrionic talents and for their apparent sincerity. On superficial acquaintance they tend to be very convincing, so it is likely that for every patient under treatment there are many non-patients whose equally fantastic reminiscences are accepted as genuine.

Noel W. Smith offered mixed reviews in 1989. She argued that Reed "begins with a historical constructs that he imposes on the events rather than deriving his constructs from the events". She said that it is inconsistent of Reed to both concede that no one can really be certain about what consciousness is, and also describe anomalies of consciousness. Smith also said that, in some instances, Reed goes deep enough in depth into topics such as deja vu that his analysis is valuable.

== Publications ==
Psychology

- The Psychology of Anomalous Experience (1972)
- Obsessional Experience and Compulsive Behaviour (1985)
- The Psychology of Channeling (1989)

Fiction

- Fisher's Creek (1963)
- Walks in Waziristan (2010)
