= Willie Purvis =

English footballer

Personal information
- Full name: William Youngson Rule Purvis
- Date of birth: 14 December 1938
- Place of birth: Berwick-upon-Tweed, England
- Date of death: 30 July 2012 (aged 73)
- Place of death: Cleethorpes, England
- Position: Forward

Senior career*
Years	Team	Apps	(Gls)
1958–1959	Alnwick Town		
1959–1961	Berwick Rangers		
1961–1962	Grimsby Town	7	(2)
1962–1963	Doncaster Rovers	2	(0)
1963–196?	Skegness Town		
- * Club domestic league appearances and goals

William Youngson Rule Purvis (14 December 1938 – 30 July 2012) was an English professional footballer who played as a forward.
