= Alan Collier =

English footballer (born 1938)

Personal information
- Full name: Alan Stanley Collier
- Date of birth: 24 March 1938 (age 88)
- Place of birth: Markyate, England
- Position: Goalkeeper

Youth career
- Luton Town

Senior career*
Years	Team	Apps	(Gls)
1955–1961	Luton Town	10	(0)
1961–1965	Chelmsford City	106	(0)
1965–1970	Bedford Town		
1967	→ Chelmsford City (loan)	2	(0)
1970	Chelmsford City	0	(0)
- Folkestone
- Stevenage Athletic

International career
- England schoolboys
1955–1956	England youth	4	(0)
- * Club domestic league appearances and goals

Alan Stanley Collier (born 24 March 1938) is an English former professional footballer who played as a goalkeeper.

== Club career ==
In 1955, Collier signed professional terms at Luton Town, after playing for the club at youth level. Over the course of six years, Collier made 13 appearances for Luton, ten coming in the Football League, before departing the club in 1961, joining Chelmsford City. Collier played for Chelmsford for four years, before joining Bedford Town in 1965. After four years at Bedford, making 206 appearances in all competitions, Collier rejoined Chelmsford for a third spell in the summer of 1970, after having a short loan stint back at the club in 1967. Collier's third stint at Chelmsford was short lived, joining Folkestone in 1970. Collier later played for Stevenage Athletic.

== International career ==
Collier represented England at schoolboy and youth level, making four appearances for England youth between 1955 and 1956.
