= Alexandre Jacques François Brière de Boismont =

French psychiatrist (1797–1881)

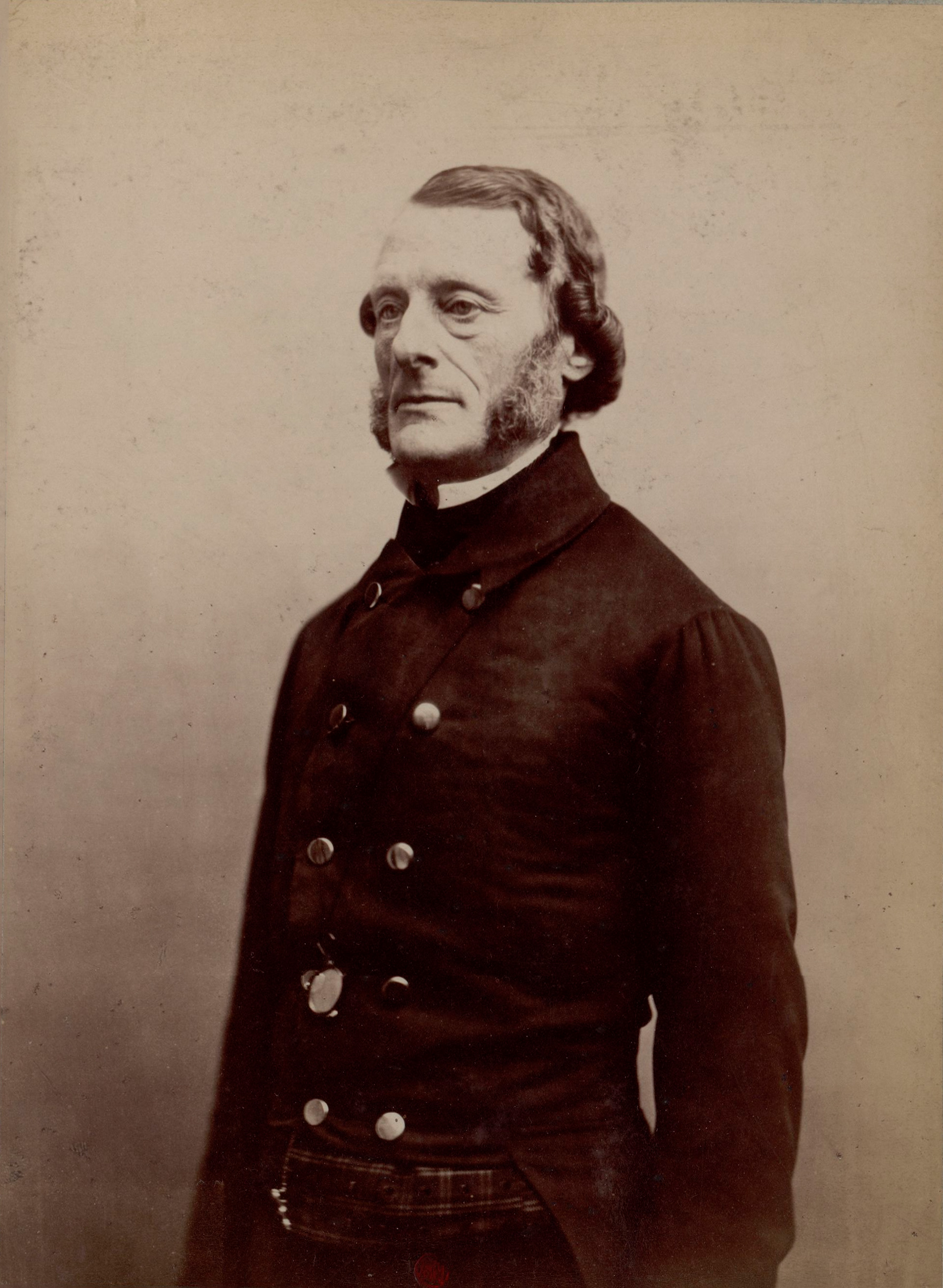
- Alexandre Jacques François Brière de Boismont
- Born: 18 October 1797; Rouen, France
- Died: 25 December 1881 (aged 84); Paris, France
- Scientific career
- Fields: Psychiatry

Alexandre Jacques François Brière de Boismont (often translated as Brierre de Boismont in English) (18 October 1797 – 25 December 1881) was a French medical doctor and psychiatrist born in Rouen.

In 1825 he received his medical doctorate in Paris, afterwards working as a physician at the nursing home of Mme Marcel Sainte-Colombe, Rue de Picpus, Paris. In 1831 he performed important studies of a cholera epidemic in Poland, and in 1838 was appointed director of a private nursing home on Rue Neuve Sainte-Genevieve, located near the Panthéon de Paris. Beginning in 1859, he practiced medicine in Saint-Mandé.

Brière de Boismont was the author of numerous publications in several medical fields, that included hygiene, forensic medicine and anatomy, but is best known for his work in psychiatry. In 1845 he published Des Hallucinations, ou Histoire raisonnée des apparitions, des visions, des songes, de l'extase, du magnétisme et du somnambulisme, a landmark study of hallucinations, of which he considered were a significant part of mankind's psychological history. This book was later translated into English as Hallucinations: or, The rational history of apparitions, dreams, ecstasy, magnetism, and somnambulism (1853).

In 1856 he published a comprehensive study on suicide, titled Du suicide et de la folie suicide. With Jules Baillarger (1809–1890) and others, he was co-editor of Annales médico-psychologique. In 1862, Brière de Boismont provided an early description of what would later become known as Kleine-Levin syndrome (KLS).

== Publications ==
- Hallucinations or, the Rational History of Apparitions, Visions, Dreams, Ecstasy, Magnetism, and Somnambulism (1853)
