= Graham Reed (footballer, born 1938) =

English footballer

Personal information
- Full name: Graham Albert William Reed
- Date of birth: 6 February 1938
- Place of birth: King's Lynn, England
- Position: Wing half

Senior career*
Years	Team	Apps	(Gls)
1953–1957	King's Lynn		
1957–1958	Sunderland	5	(0)
1958–19??	Wisbech Town		
- * Club domestic league appearances and goals

Graham Albert William Reed (born 6 February 1938) is an English former professional footballer who played as a wing half for Sunderland.
