= Bhummaso =

Earth Guardian Spirit or deity in folk Burmese and Thai Laos Cambodia

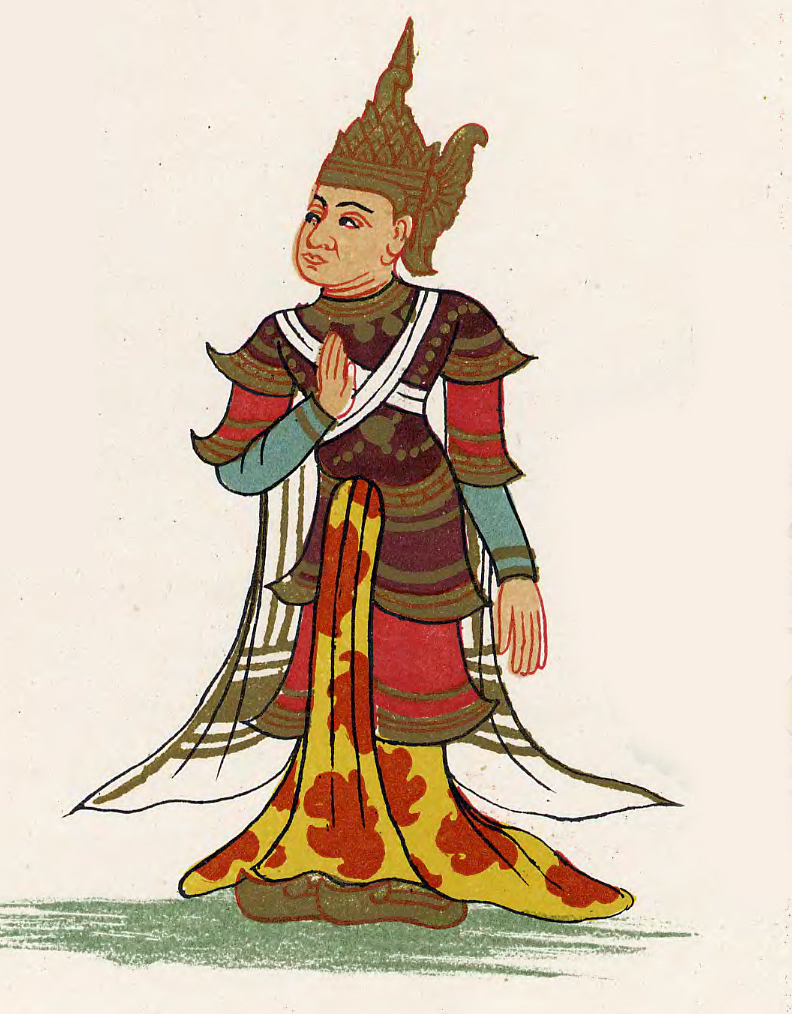
An artistic rendition of an Myay Saung Nat

Bhummaso is a deity in folk Southeast Asia which originated from local religions and was combined with Theravada Buddhism and Hinduism. This term can refer to either male or female depending on the place they are in charge of. In Burmese, they are known as Myay Saunt Nat (Burmese: မြေစောင့်နတ်; lit. "Earth Guardian Spirit"), are Burmese nats (spirits) who inhabit the roots of trees and serve as guardians of the earth. In Thai and other Tai languages, they are known as Phra Bhum Chao Tee (Thai: พระภูมิเจ้าที่; lit. "Earth Guardian Spirit"). In Khmer they are known by their title Preah Phum tevoda (Thai: ព្រះភូមិទេវតា; lit. "Earth Guardian Spirit").

== Burmese folk religion ==
Myay Saunt Nat (Burmese: မြေစောင့်နတ်; lit. "Earth Guardian Spirit"), are Burmese nats (spirits) who inhabit the roots of trees and serve as guardians of the earth.

They are related to Thitpin Saunt Nat and Akathaso who respectively live on the tree trunks and sky. Akathaso are guardian spirits of the sky while Thitpin Saunt Nat are guardian spirits of tree.

== Tai folk religion ==
They are generally worshipped in spirit houses that can be found everywhere in Thailand and Cambodia. Their group consisted of nine men and women in Tai folk religion and khmer folk religion with They will appear wearing traditional ancient crowns and regalia shoes in depending on the local art., each with their own roles and responsibilities at different locations, each with their own name and symbols, as follows:

Name Male	Name female	Symbol or weapon of Male	Symbol or weapon of female	Roles and responsibilities	note
Chaimongkol (พระชัยมงคล)	Phumchaiya or Phumchaya (นางภูมไชยา หรือ ภูมชายา)	The right hand holds a double-edge straight sword and the left hand holds a bag of money (Male)	The left hand holds a lotus flower and the right hand holds a bag of money (female)	Protection general homes and shops	Popularly worshipped in homes and palaces and Respected alongside Dharā and Bhumi in Hinduism in Thailand and Hinduism in Cambodia
Nakhonrat (พระนครราช)	Phummala (นางภูมมาลา)	The right hand holds a double-edge straight sword and the left hand holds a bunch of flowers (Male)	The right hand holds a flower garland and the left hand holds a walking stick (female)	Protection fortress , Camps, city door, stairs	Popularly worshipped in Warrior, soldier and government officer. His important and famous shrine appears in the area Suvarnabhumi airport Respected alongside Savitr and Savitri in Hinduism in Thailand and Hinduism in Cambodia
Tepen (พระเทเพน)	thipmalee (นางทิพมาลี)	The right hand holds a short spear or double-edge straight sword and the left hand holds a scripture (Male)	The right hand holds a rope and the left hand holds a clump of grass (female)	Protection Farms and enclosure, pen, or stall	Respected alongside Chitragupta and saraswati in Hinduism in Thailand and Hinduism in Cambodia
Chaiyasop (พระชัยศพณ์) or supphakontap (พระสัพพคนธรรพ์)	Shribhapha (นางศรีประภา)	The right hand holds a long spear and the left hand is placed at the side of the body. (Male)	The right hand holds a Scythe and the left hand is Shoulder bag (female)	Protection barn or granary	Respected as the guardian of the treasury Has similar functions to Phra Klang mahasombat (พระคลังมหาสมบัติ) and Nang Kwak and Respected alongside kubera and lakshmi in Hinduism in Thailand and Hinduism in Cambodia
khontap (พระคนธรรพ์)	Supriya (นางสุปริยา)	The right hand holds a double-edge straight sword and the left hand holds a pot (Male)	The right hand holds a pot and the left hand holds a Bouquet of roses (female)	Protection Pavilion or Ceremony Hall	Respected alongside kamadeva and Rati in Hinduism in Thailand and Hinduism in Cambodia
Thammahora (พระธรรมโหรา) or nakarat (พระนาคราช) or yaowapaew (พระเยาวะแผ้ว)	khawkhaokra (นางขวัญข้าวกร้า)	The right hand holds a double-edge straight sword and the left hand holds a Peacock tail bouquet (Male)	The right hand holds a Scythe and the left hand holds a Rice ears (female)	Gardens, fields, pastures	Has similar functions to Phra Mahachai Phraisop and phosop
Tevathera (พระเทวเถร) or vaiyathat (พระวัยทัต)	dokmaithong (นางดอกไม้ทอง)	The right hand holds a goad or prod and the left hand holds a Placed beside the body (Male)	The right hand holds a Canna Lily and the left hand holds a Incense and candles (female)	Protection temple or Religious places, pagodas	In Thailand, he is also known by another name: suevat (เสื้อวัด)
Dhatramikkarat (พระธรรมิกราช)	phummaiphai (นางพุ่มไม้ไพร)	The right hand holds a double-edge straight sword and the left hand holds a flower garland (Male)	The right hand holds a banana and the left hand holds a Cork Wood Tree and Flower bud (female)	Protection Mountains, forests and Natural places	In Thailand, he is also known by another name: chaopha chaokhao (เจ้าป่าเจ้าเขา) or Phra Phanatbodi (พระพนัสบดี) and Respected alongside rudra and Aranyani in Hinduism in Thailand and Hinduism in Cambodia
Thatthara (พระทาษธารา) or thatthan (พระธาตุธาร) or thasathara (ทาสธารา)	rinraruen (นางรินระรื่น)	The right hand holds a short spear and left hand is placed at the side of the body (Male)	The right hand holds a Lotus in bloom and left hand is Conch (female)	Protection Lake, Canal, Stream, Rapids, Spring River sea	Respected alongside varuna and ganga in Hinduism in Thailand and Hinduism in Cambodia

idol for devoted respect is a symbol or representative of earth Guardian Spirit or deity. , guardian deity area , guardians of the trees , Tutelary deity in Tai folk religion with khmer folk religion and Hinduism in Thailand with Hinduism in Cambodia It will be called Javed(เจว็ด) Which has a shape similar to a Sema stone (ใบเสมา)., Which is the most important thing in As their representative like Murti in hinduism.

== Gallery ==
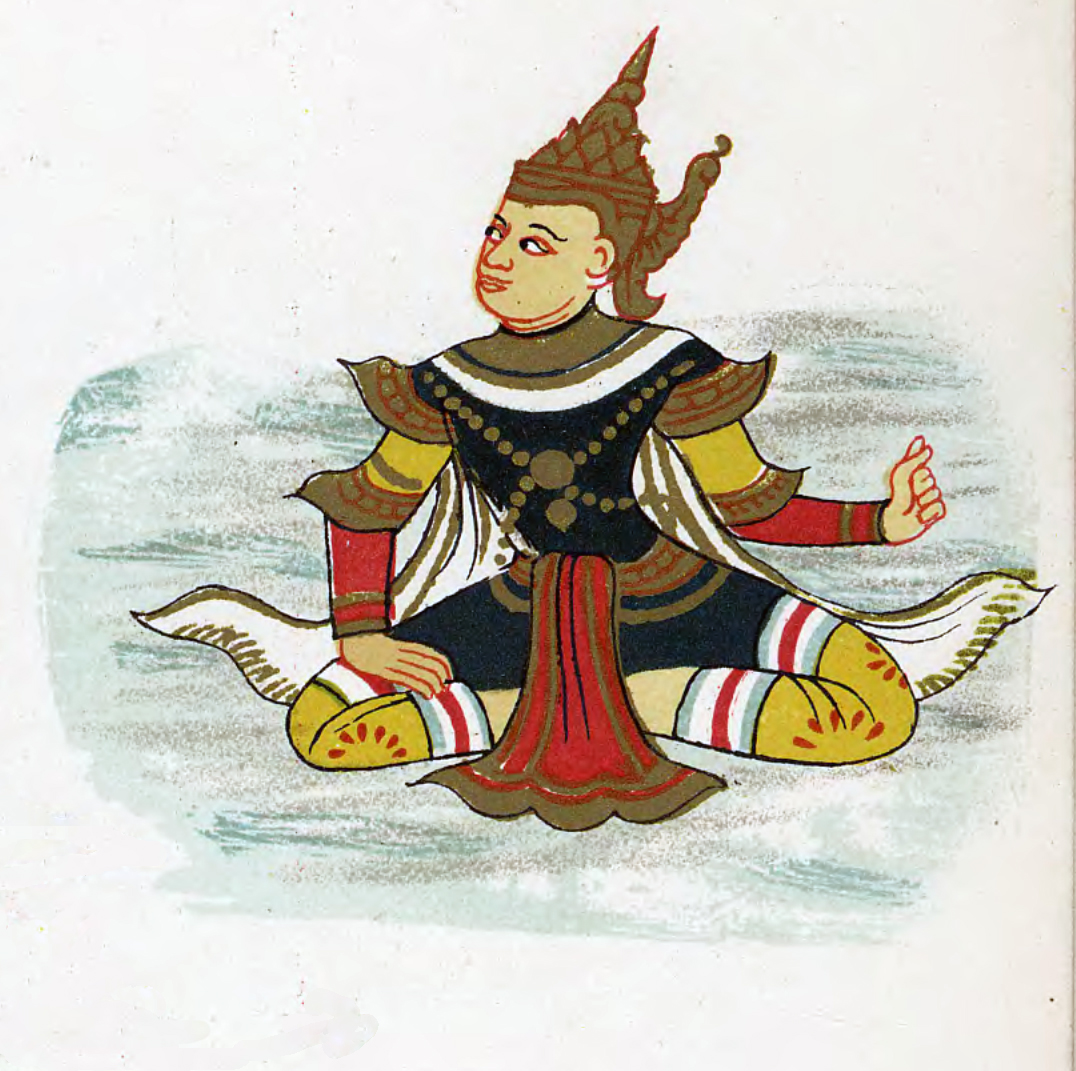
Akathaso

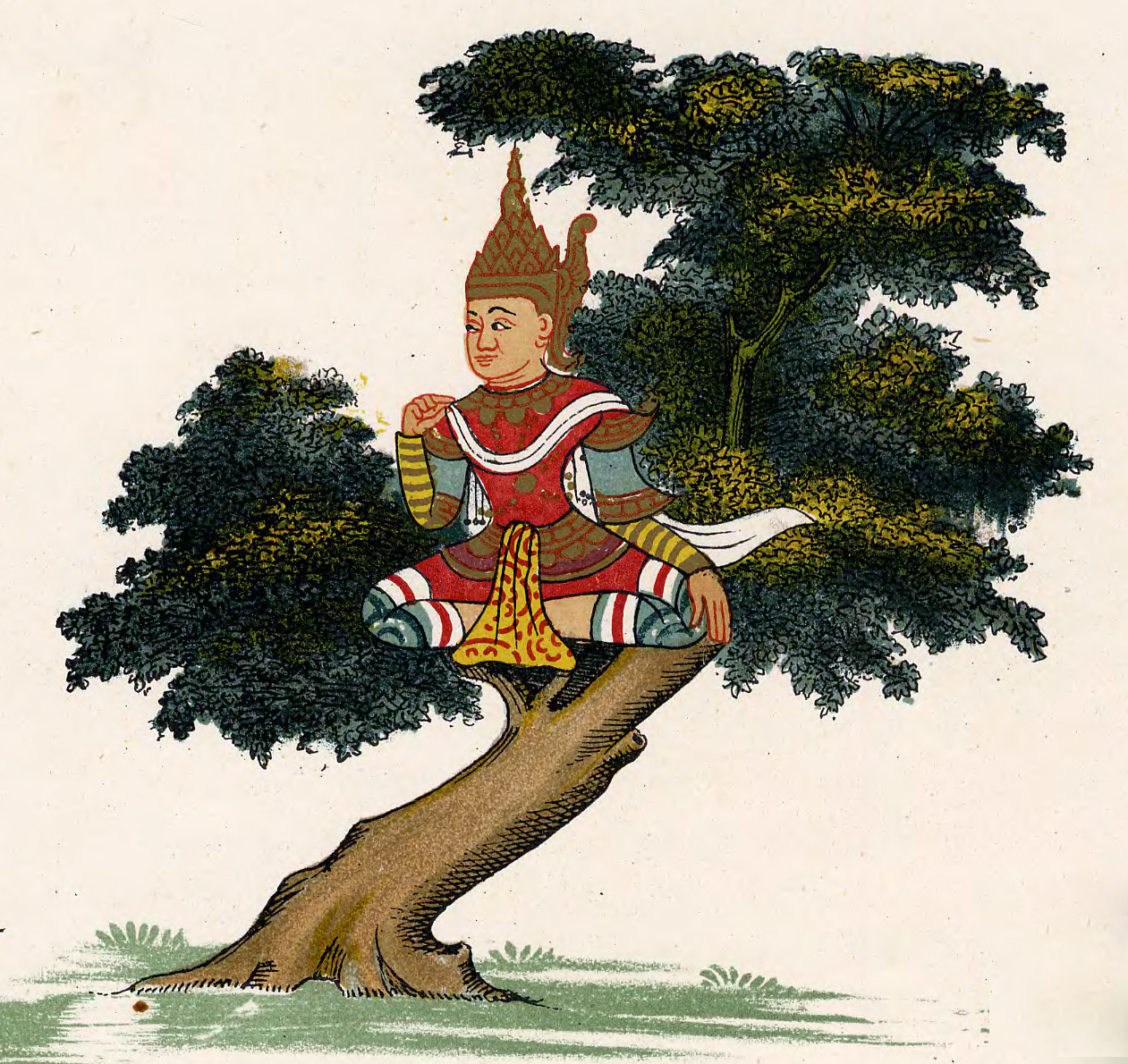
Yokkaso

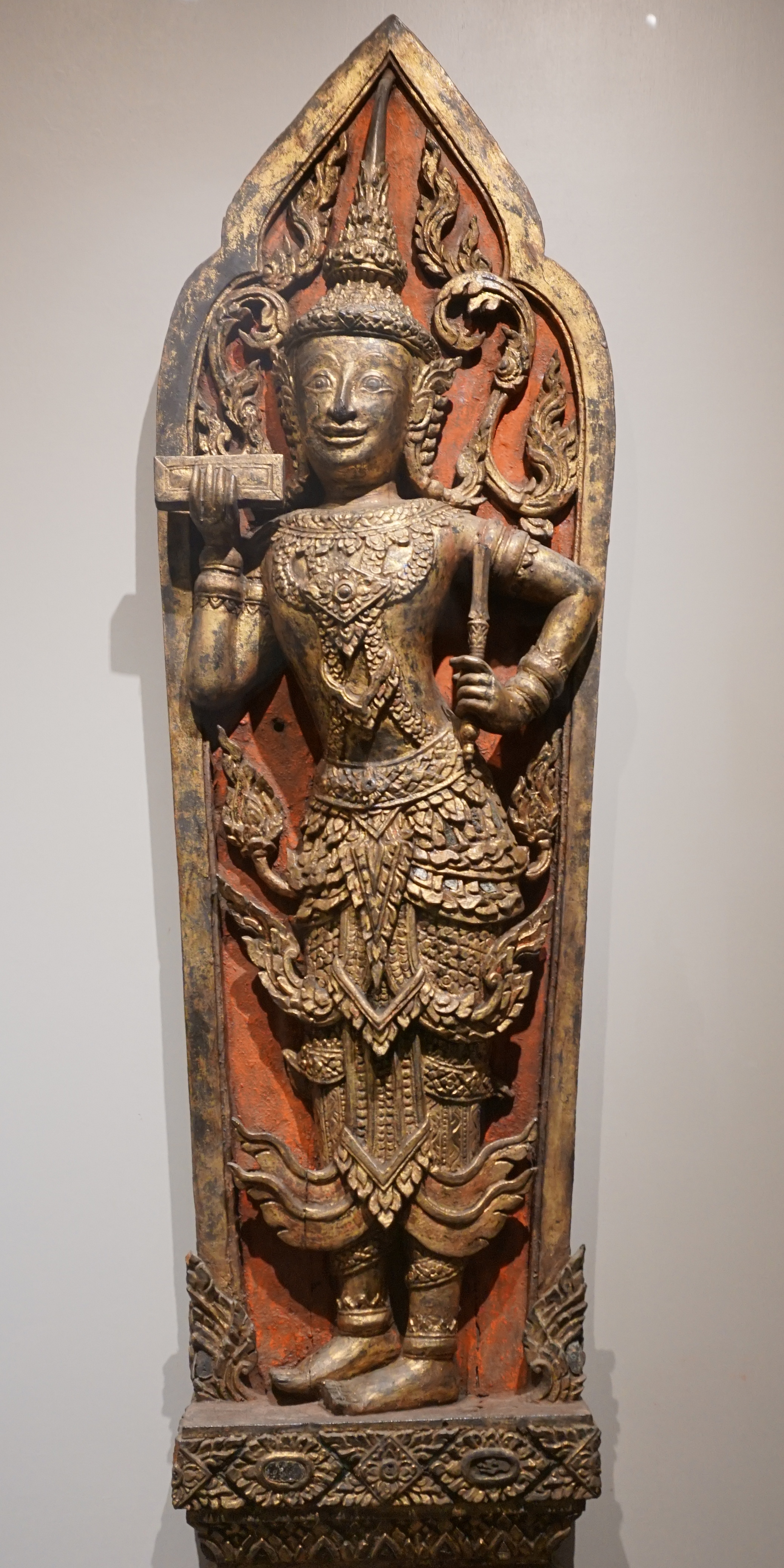
the Javed (เจว็ด) of Bhummaso in Early Rattanakosin art Currently on display at Bangkok National Museum.

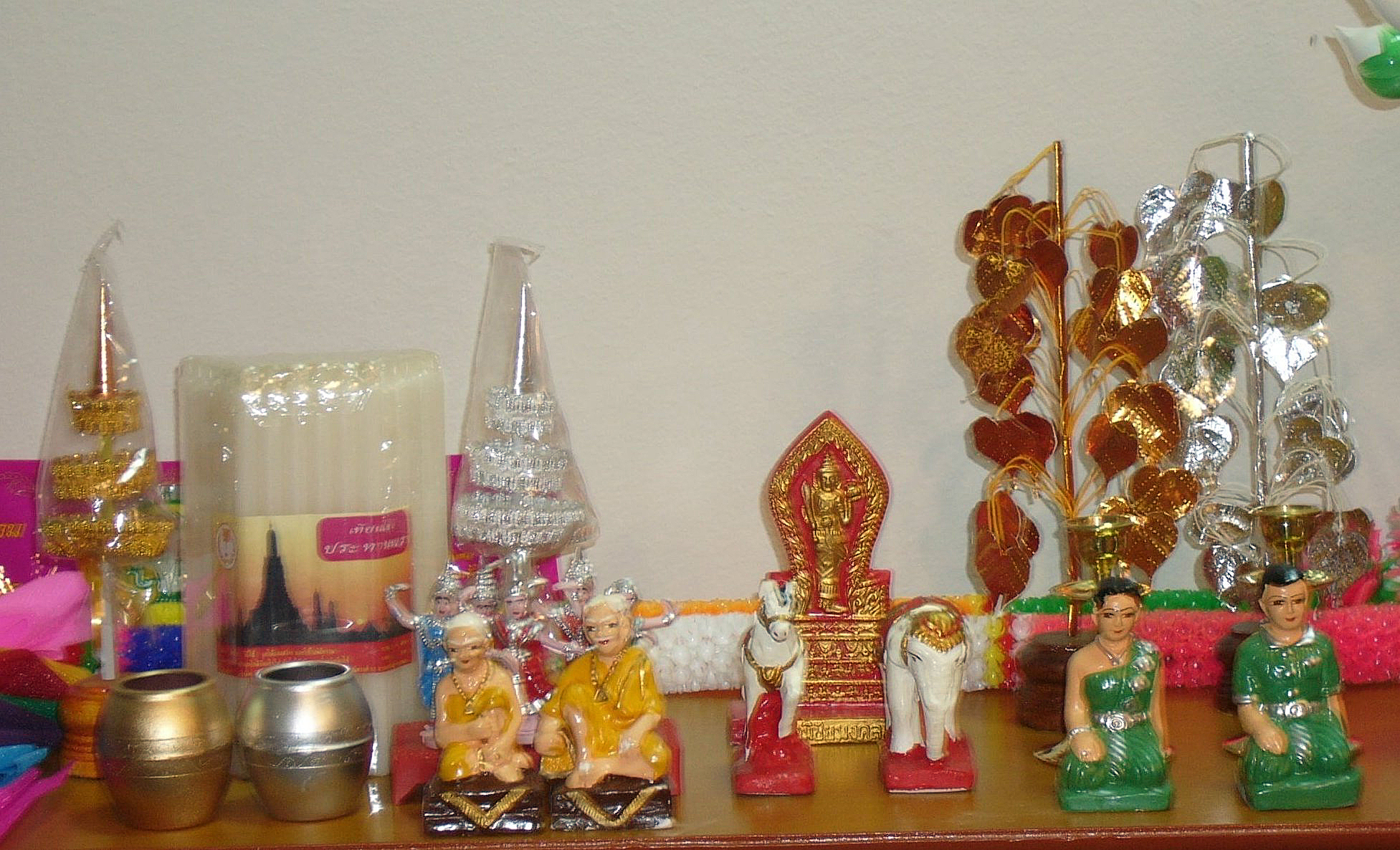
Equipment used in the ordination ceremony spirit house, Javed (เจว็ด) are of the utmost importance.

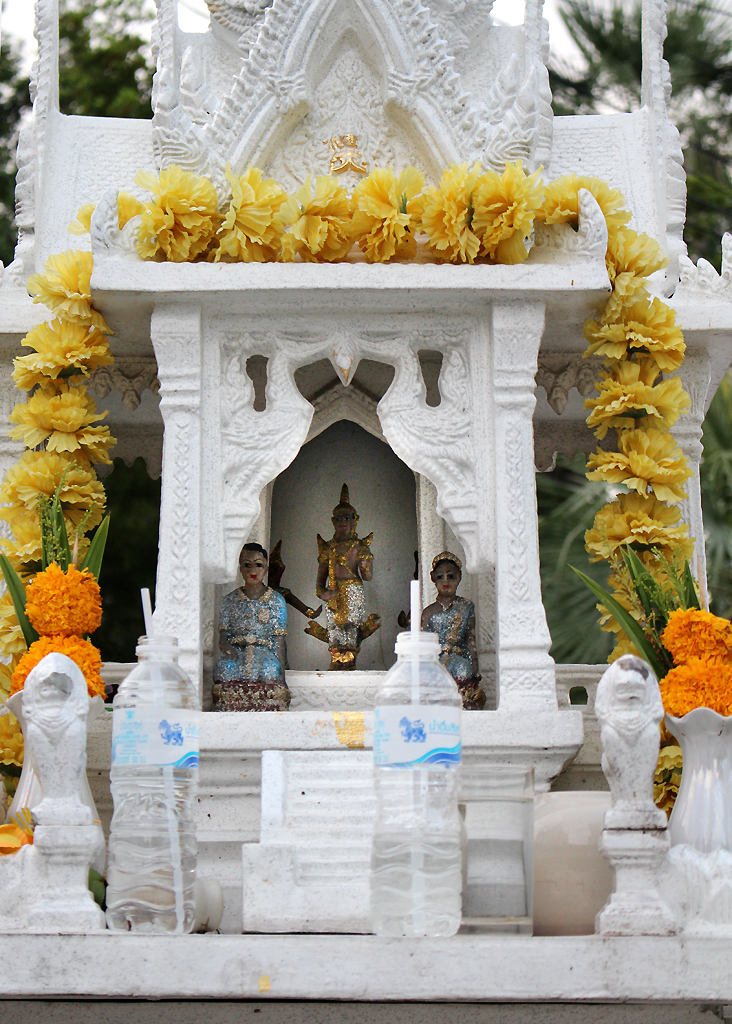
The idol of Phra phum Chaimongkol (พระภูมิชัยมงคล) of Tai folk religion in spirit house

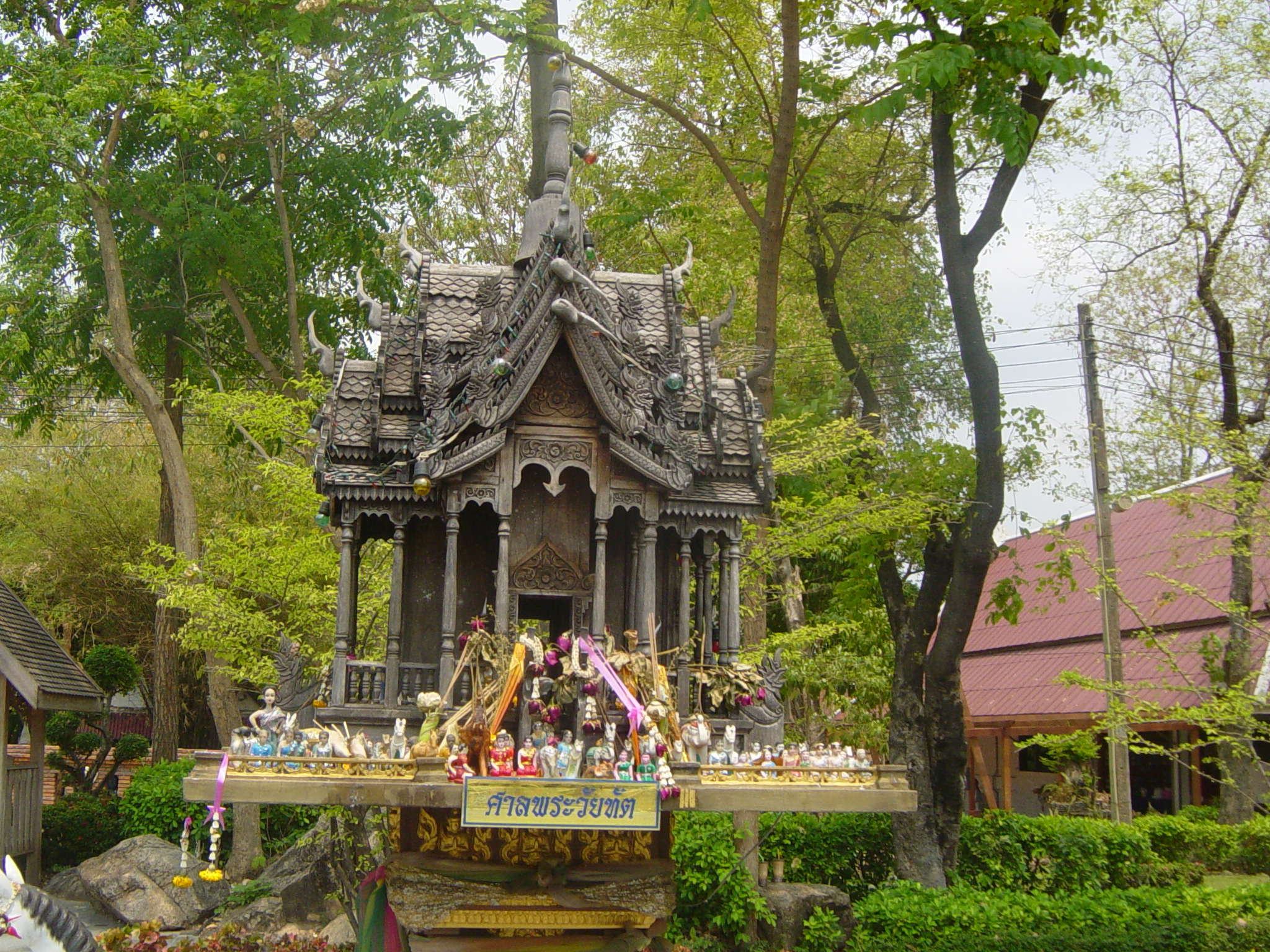
The spirit house are devoted Phra phum vaiyathat (พระภูมิวัยทัต) of Tai folk religion in Taksin Memorial , Tak, Thailand
