= List of agricultural deities =

This is a list of agriculture gods and goddesses, gods whose tutelary specialty was agriculture, either of agriculture in general or of one or more specialties within the field. Each god's culture or religion of origin is listed; a god revered in multiple contexts are listed with the one in which they originated. Roman gods appear on a separate list.

== Americas ==
Name	Origin	Notes
Azaka Medeh	Haitian Vodou	
Dan Petro	Haitian Vodou	
Chaquén	Muisca	
Centeōtl	Aztec	
Cintēteo	Aztec	Four sons of Centeōtl. Consist of: Iztāc-Cinteōtl (meaning white corn); Tlatlauhca-Cinteōtl (meaning red corn); Cozauhca-Cinteōtl (meaning yellow corn); Yayauhca-Cinteōtl (meaning black corn)
Ixtlilton	Aztec	
Metztli	Aztec	Moon god.
Patecatl	Aztec	
Xipe Totec	Aztec	
Xochipilli	Aztec	
Kokopelli	Southwestern Native Americans	
Chaac	Maya	
Kukulkan	Maya	
Maya maize god	Maya	
Q'uq'umatz	Maya	

== Asia ==
Name	Origin	Notes
Balarama	Hindu	
Yaksha	Hindu	Also occurs in jainism and buddhism.
Ame no Wakahiko	Japanese	
Amenohoakari	Japanese	Also a sun god.
Daikokuten	Japanese	
Dōsojin	Japanese	
Inari Ōkami	Japanese	
Hachiman	Japanese	Syncretic god. Also a war god.
Hoori	Japanese	
Ōkuninushi	Japanese	
Ōmononushi	Japanese	
Ta-no-Kami	Japanese	
Takeminakata	Japanese	
Ugajin	Japanese	
Ukanomitama	Japanese	
Dagon	Canaanite	
Dewi Sri	Bali and Javanese	
Nyai Pohaci Sanghyang Asri	Sundanese	
Emesh	Mesopotamian	
Enbilulu	Mesopotamian	
Enkimdu	Mesopotamian	
Enten	Mesopotamian	
Ennugi	Mesopotamian	
Kus	Mesopotamian	
Lahar	Mesopotamian	
Lumma	Mesopotamian	Also a war god.
Ninurta	Mesopotamian	
Nisroch	Mesopotamian	
Sumugan	Mesopotamian	
Tammuz	Mesopotamian	
Hainuwele	Maluku	
Ḫalki	Hittite	
Ḫapantali	Hittite	
Kumarbi	Hittite	
Telipinu	Hittite	
Weather god of Nerik	Hittite	
Houji	Chinese	Deified man.
Pa-cha	Chinese	
Shennong	Chinese	
Mahākāla	Vajrayana	
Nulgupjisin	Korean	
Panthoibi	Meitei	
Phou Ningthou	Meitei	
Phosop	Thai folk religion, Lao folk religion and Khmer folk religion	
Phouoibi	Thai folk religion, Lao folk religion and Khmer folk religion	
Phra Mahachai Phraisop	Thai folk religion, Lao folk religion and Khmer folk religion	
Phra Bhum Dhammahora	Thai folk religion, Lao folk religion and Khmer folk religion	
Thần Nông	Vietnamese	

== Europe ==
Name	Origin	Notes
Abellio	Celtic	From the Garonne Valley in France.
Amaethon	Celtic	Welsh.
Anu	Celtic	Irish. Also known as Anann or Anand.
Dagda	Celtic	Irish.
Esus	Celtic	Gaulish.
Sucellus	Celtic	Gaulish.
Äkräs	Finnish	
Ukko	Finnish	
Peko	Finnish	
Agathodaemon	Greek	
Aristaeus	Greek	
Attis	Greek	
Cronus	Greek	
Demeter	Greek	
Dionysus	Greek	Fruit and wine god.
Heracles	Greek	
Hermes	Greek	
Pan	Greek	
Persephone	Greek	Daughter of Demeter.
Philomelus	Greek	
Priapus	Greek	
Portunus		
Freyr	Norse	
Feldgeister	German	Corn spirits.
Bassareus	Thracians	Counterpart of Dionysus.
Hennil	Slavic	Polabian Slavs' mythology.
Radegast	Slavic	
Veles	Slavic	
Yarilo	Slavic	
Maris	Etruscan	
Saturn	Roman	

== Africa ==
Name	Origin	Notes
Oko	Yoruba	
Mukasa	Baganda	
Njoku Ji	Igbo people	Yam guardian.
Geb	Egyptian	
Hapi	Egyptian	
Min	Egyptian	
Osiris	Egyptian	
Neper	Egyptian	
Shezmu	Egyptian	
Nomkhubulwane	Zulu	

== Oceania ==
Name	Origin	Notes
Lono	Hawaiian	
Matariki	Maori	
Rongo	Maori	
