= Korravai =

Hindu goddess

- Mother Goddess; Supreme Goddess in Shaivism
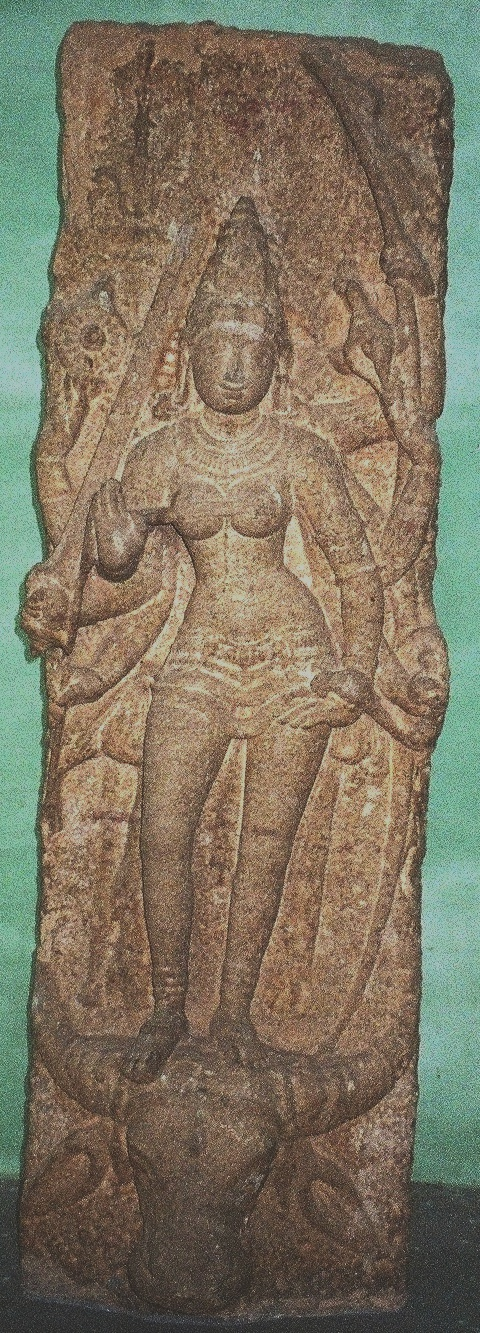
- Korravai atop the beheaded head and body of the slain buffalo-demon Mahishasura. This relief carving, originally from the remnants of a 10th-century CE Hindu temple in Thiruvalanjuli, is now located within the Tanjore Palace Museum.
- Mount: Blackbuck, lion
- Region: Tamil Nadu, Sri Lanka

Korravai or Kotravai, is a form of the primordial Hindu goddess Durga-Parvati, the goddess of war and victory, in South India and Sri Lanka. She is also a mother goddess and the goddess of fertility, agriculture, and hunters. In the latter form, she is sometimes referred to by other names and epithets in the Tamil tradition, such as Atha, Mari, Suli, and Neeli.

== Etymology ==
Her name is derived from the Tamil word korram, which means "victory, success, bravery".

== History ==
The earliest references to Kotravai are found in the ancient Tamil grammar Tolkappiyam, considered to be the earliest work of the ancient Sangam literature.

She is among the earliest documented goddesses in the Tamil Sangam literature, and also found in later Tamil literature. She is mentioned in the many poems in Paripāṭal , though the dedicated poem to her in among those that are being discovered in history. She is mentioned in the Pattuppattu anthology – the long Tamil poems dated between 300 BCE to 300 CE, including the Neṭunalvāṭai, Maturaikkanci, Poruṇarāṟṟuppaṭai, and Paṭṭiṉappālai. In the Tamil epic Silappadikaram (c. 2nd-century), she is said to be the goddess of the Pālai region.

== Depiction ==
She is seen as a mother goddess, a symbol of fertility and success in agriculture. Traditional rural communities offer the first harvest to her. As war goddess who is blood thirsty, some texts such as the Silappadikaram and Agananuru mention that warrior devotees would, in a frenzy, offer their own head to the goddess.

In Tamil Nadu, the blackbuck (kalaimaan) is considered to be her vehicle. She is sometimes shown as riding a lion, as in the 7th-century mandapam of the Group of Monuments at Mahabalipuram, Tamil Nadu. Both the lion and blackbuck is shown with a standing Korravai in a rock-relief panel at the Varaha Mandapam of Mahabalipuram.

She is depicted as a deity with several arms holding different weapons. She is said to be the real mother of the Hindu god Kartikeya and her other children with Shiva as a form of Parvati. Sacrifices of animals and plants and dancing rituals are a part of the worship of this goddess.

== Culture ==
Korava Idal and Kulavai Idal refer to the traditional practice of ululation as a war cry or call to victory in Dravidian cultures. Historically associated with battle and triumph, this ritual ululation is a significant cultural expression in the states of Kerala and Tamil Nadu. Today, it is commonly performed during celebratory occasions such as weddings, housewarmings, and other festive events.

== Gallery ==
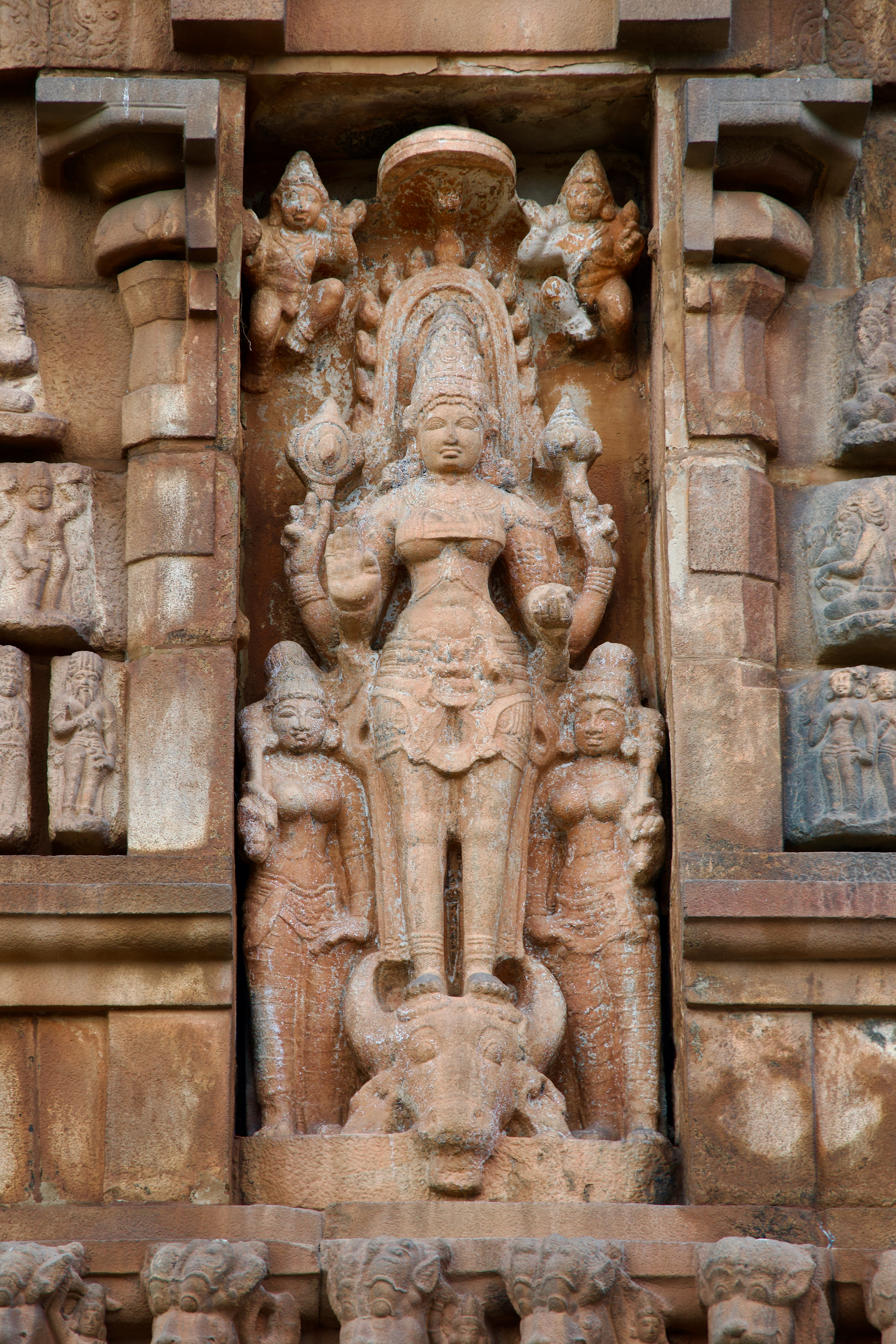
Korravai at Brihadishvara Temple, Thanjavur

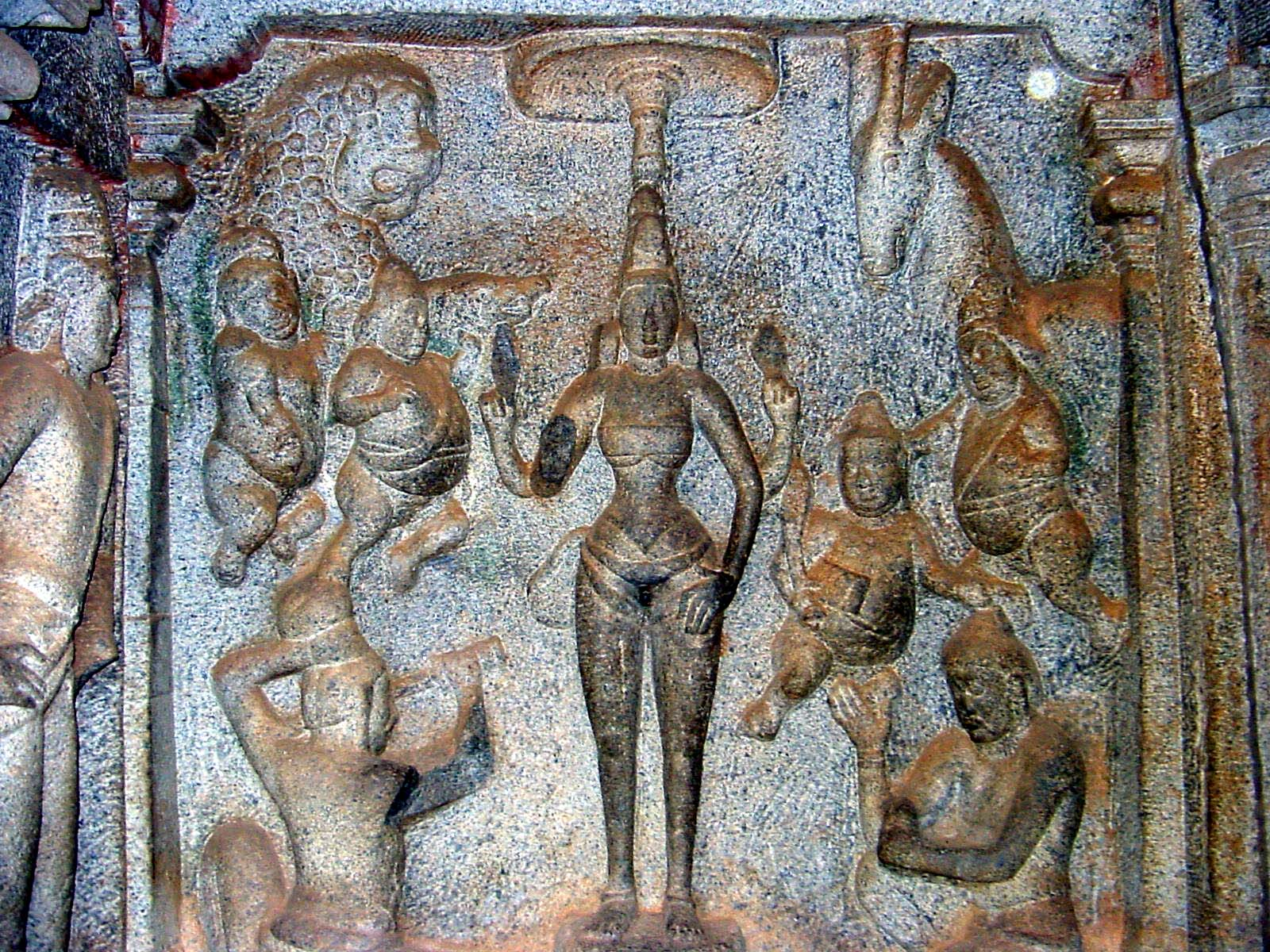
Standing Durga-Korravai in Varaha Mandapam.

== Bibliography ==
- Mahalakshmi, R. (2009). "Caṇkam literature as a social prism: an interrogation". Chapter 3 (29–41) in Brajadulal Chattopadhyaya (editor). A Social History of Early India. Pearson Education, India.
- Harle, James C. (1963). "Durgā, Goddess of Victory". Artibus Asiae. 26 (3/4): 237–246. doi:10.2307/3248984. JSTOR 3248984.
- Kersenboom-Story, Saskia C. (1987). Nityasumaṅgalī: devadasi tradition in South India. Motilal Banarsidass.
- Kinsley, David R. (1988). Hindu goddesses: visions of the divine feminine in the Hindu religious tradition. Hermeneutics: Studies in the History of Religions 12. University of California Press.
- Tiwari, Jagdish Narain (1985). Goddess Cults in Ancient India (with special reference to the first seven centuries A.D.). Sundeep Prakashan. [Adapted from his PhD thesis accepted by the Australian National University in 1971.]
