= Isoup Ganthy =

Cambodian equestrian and diplomat (1929–1976)

- Ganthy riding Flatteur II in 1956

Personal information
- Native name: អ៊ុ សូបគន្ធី
- Born: 12 November 1929 Phnom Penh, French Cambodia
- Died: 6 December 1976 (aged 47) Phnom Penh, Democratic Kampuchea

Sport
- Sport: Equestrian

Isoup Ganthy (Khmer: អ៊ុ សូបគន្ធី; 12 November 1929 – 6 December 1976) was a Cambodian equestrian and diplomat. Born to an Indian-Cambodian family, he later joined the Cambodian National Police and began horseback riding. He then studied in France and further practiced the sport. At the 1956 Summer Olympics, he competed as part of the first Cambodian team at a games, doing so in the individual show jumping event. He did not medal in the event.

After the games, he became involved in politics as a diplomat. He represented the Norodom Sihanouk-led GRUNK government-in-exile during the 1970s and seized the country's embassy in Prague in what was then Czechoslovakia, alongside Cambodian students. He later served as ambassador to Albania and then Sweden. He was arrested by the Khmer Rouge in September 1976 and was sent to Tuol Sleng prison, forcing him to confess treason. He later died within custody in the prison.

== Early life and sporting career ==
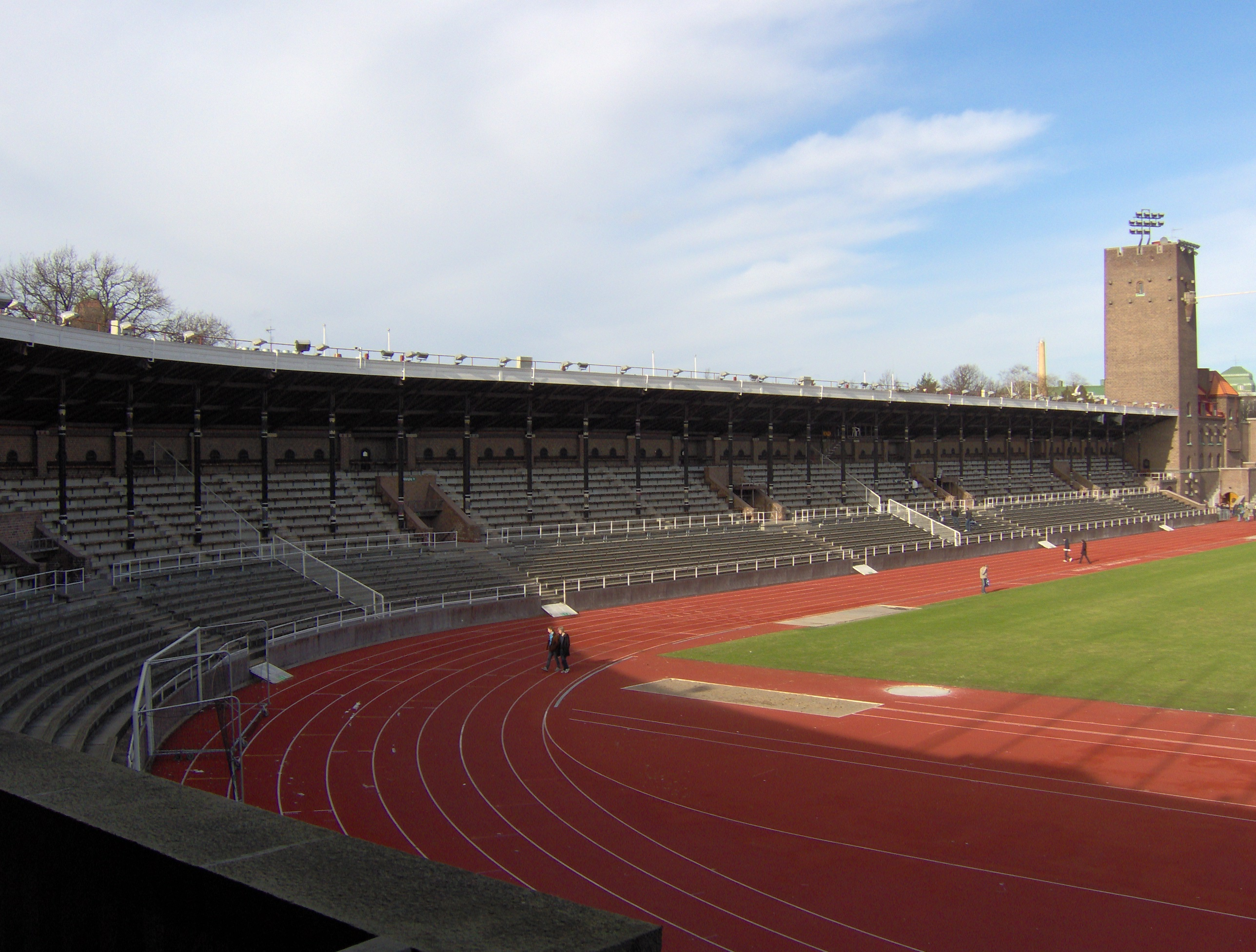
The site of the equestrian events (pictured in 2007) where Ganthy competed in

Isoup Ganthy was born on 12 November 1929 in Phnom Penh, Cambodia, to an Indian-Cambodian family. Later on, he joined the Cambodian National Police and began horseback riding. He moved to France for several years to continue his studies alongside learning more about the sport and refining his technique.

He was later invited to be part of the first Cambodian team at an Olympic Games, doing so at the 1956 Summer Olympics. Although most of the events for the games were held in Melbourne, Australia, due to Australian regulations on horses at the time that required a six-month pre-shipment quarantine, the equestrian events were held in Stockholm, Sweden. Alongside his teammate Saing Pen, they competed in the individual show jumping event on 17 June. Ganthy rode on Flatteur II and did not complete his run in the first round, thus eliminating him from the event. Due to this, he did not medal in the event. Cambodia would not send a team for the Melbourne-held events as they boycotted the games in response to the Suez Crisis.

== Diplomacy years, arrest, and death ==
Upon returning back to Cambodia after his studies, he was involved in government activities. He worked for the Ministry of Foreign Affairs and served as a diplomat, representing the Norodom Sihanouk-led GRUNK government-in-exile during the 1970s. On 10 August shortly after the 1970 Cambodian coup d'état, he, his family, and a group of Cambodian students seized the country's embassy in Prague in what was then Czechoslovakia from ambassador Measketh Cairmorom and three other diplomats of Lon Nol's Khmer Republic government, which had established de facto control over Cambodia. Ganthy at the time served as the secretary of the embassy and the occupants of the embassy declared that they would join the National United Front of Kampuchea led by Sihanouk. Ganthy then held a press conference to criticize Nol's inner circle "for betraying the cause of the Khmer people and acting as the stooge of U.S. imperialism" as stated by the Peking Review. Electricity and water in the embassy were eventually shut off. Sihanouk then requested to the Czechoslovak government to restore the water and electricity in the embassy and for the diplomats of China and North Vietnam be permitted to deliver food to the occupants. Sihanouk then further requested that the Czechoslovak government to recognize his government rather than of Nol's.

Ganthy later served as the ambassador of Cambodia to Albania and then Sweden. He was then arrested by the Khmer Rouge in September 1976 as they had suspected Ganthy of assisting the KGB to overthrow the country. He was sent to the Tuol Sleng prison and was forced to confess treason. He later died, possibly killed, on 6 December 1976 at the age of 47.
