= Akathaso =

Burmese spirits

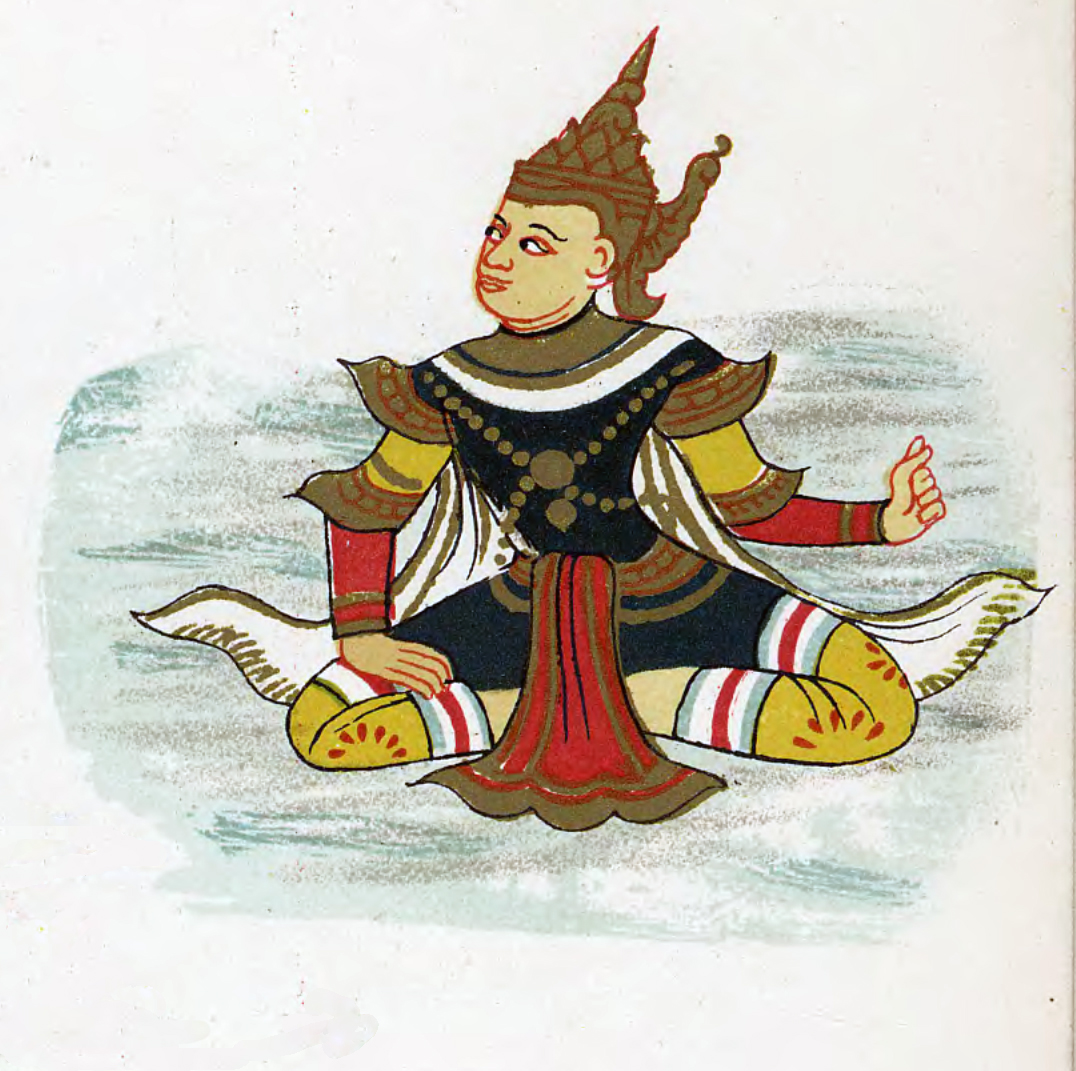
An artistic rendition of an Akathaso

Akathaso (Burmese: အာကာသစိုး) are Burmese nats (spirits) who inhabit the tops of trees and serve as guardians of the sky.

They are related to Thitpin Saunt Nat and Myay Saunt Nat,who respectively live on the trunks and roots of the trees. Myay Saunt Nats are guardian spirits of the earth while Thitpin Saunt Nats are guardian spirits of trees.

== Gallery ==
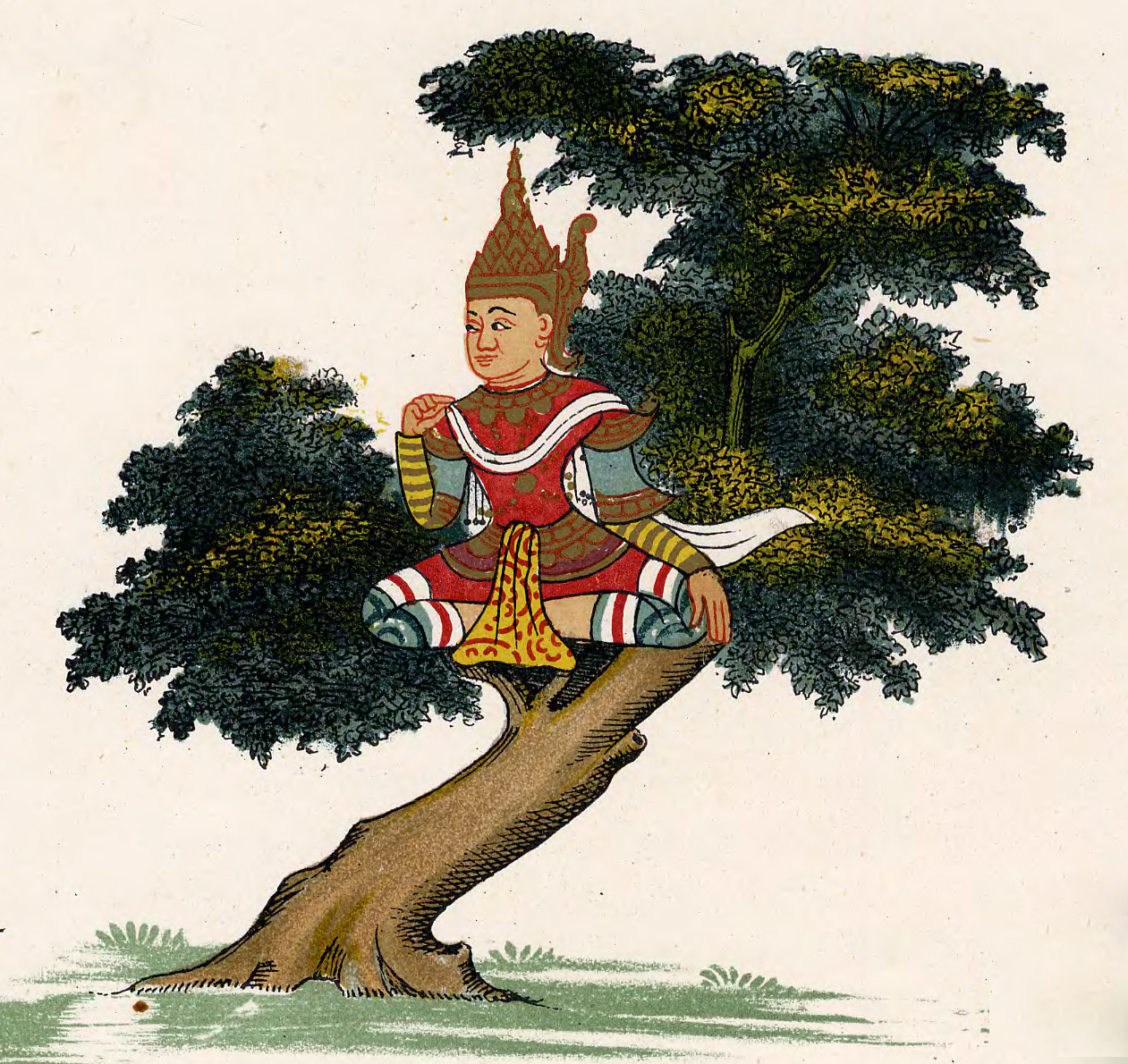
Yokkaso

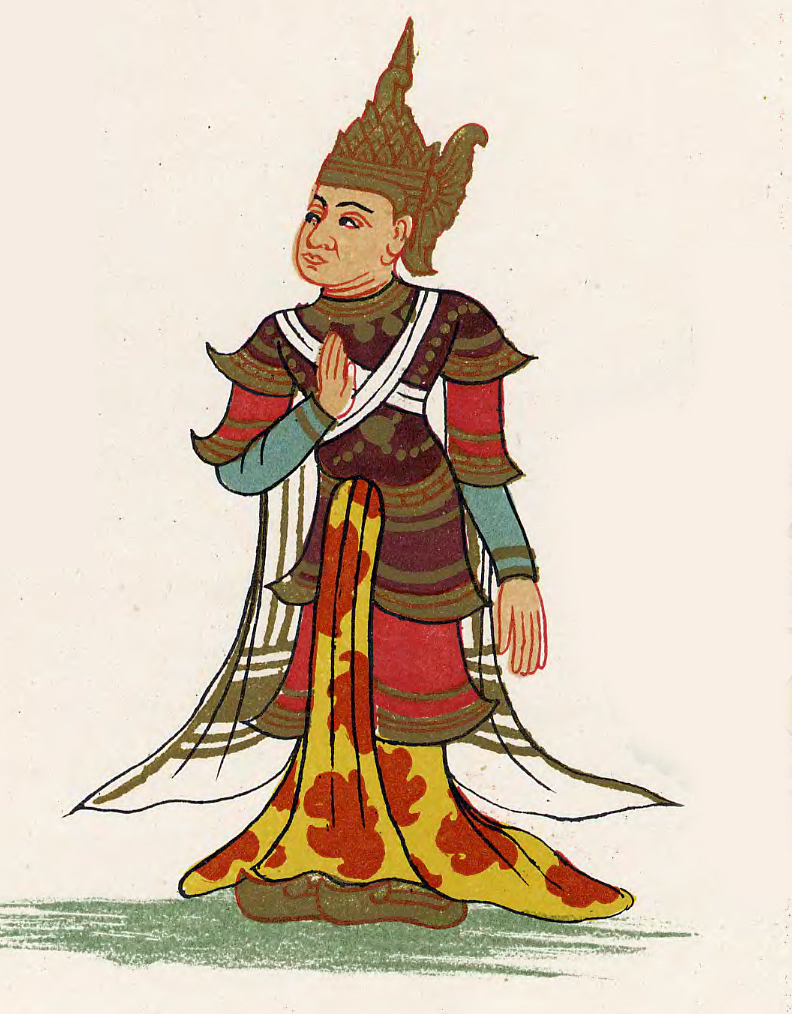
Bhummaso
