= Yokkaso =

Burmese spirit of trees

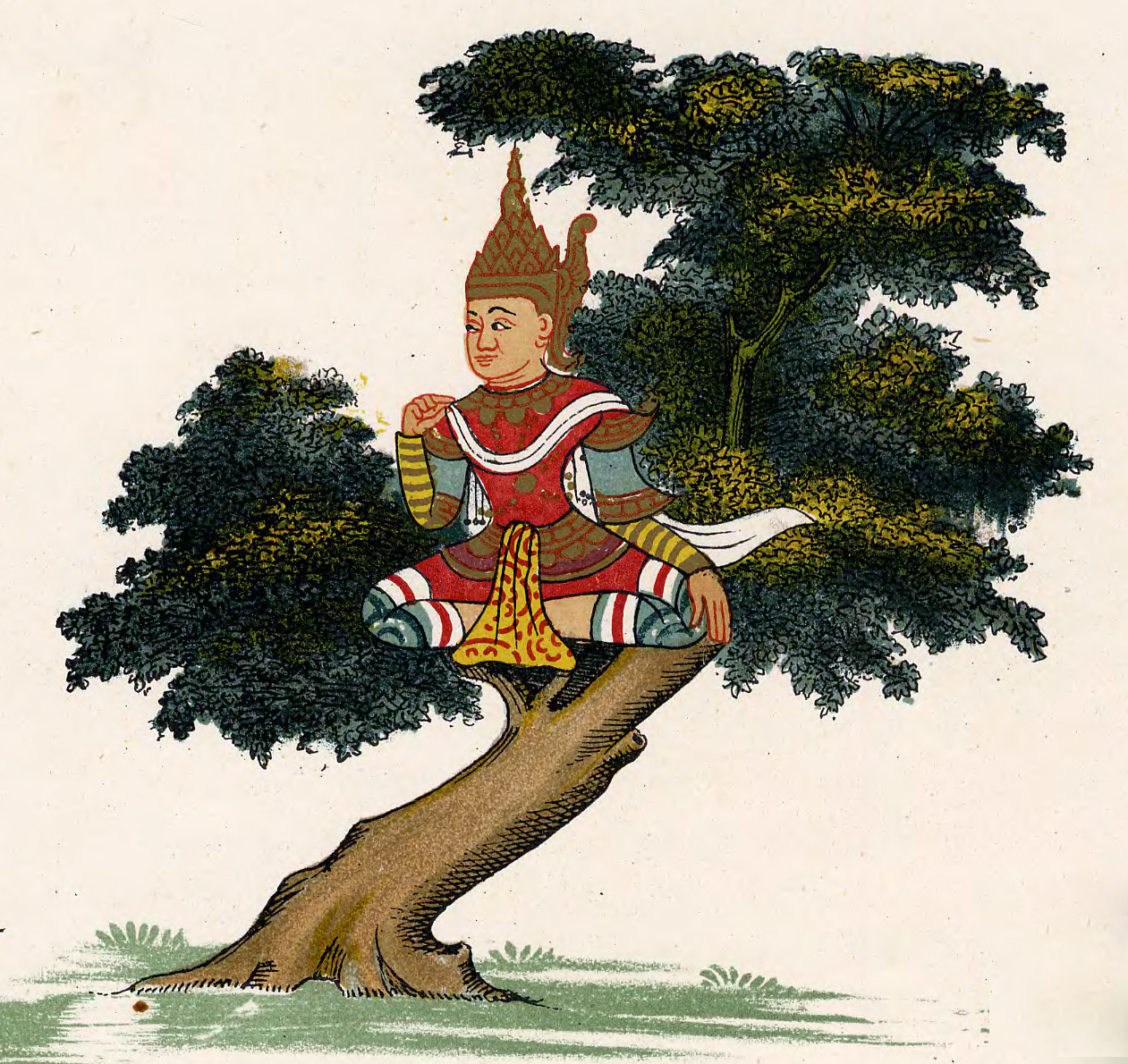
An artistic rendition of a Thitpin Saung Nat

Yokkaso (Burmese: ရုက္ခစိုး, MLCTS: rukhka.cui:; Pali: rukkhadevatā; Sanskrit: vṛkṣadevatā), also known as Thitpin Saunt Nat (Burmese: သစ်ပင်စောင့်နတ်; lit. 'Tree Guardian Spirit'), are Burmese nats (spirits) who serve as guardians of the trees.

They are related to Bhummaso (ဘုမ္မစိုး; bhūmideva), spirits that inhabit the earth; and Akathaso (အာကာသစိုး; ākāsadeva), spirits that inhabit the sky.

== Gallery ==
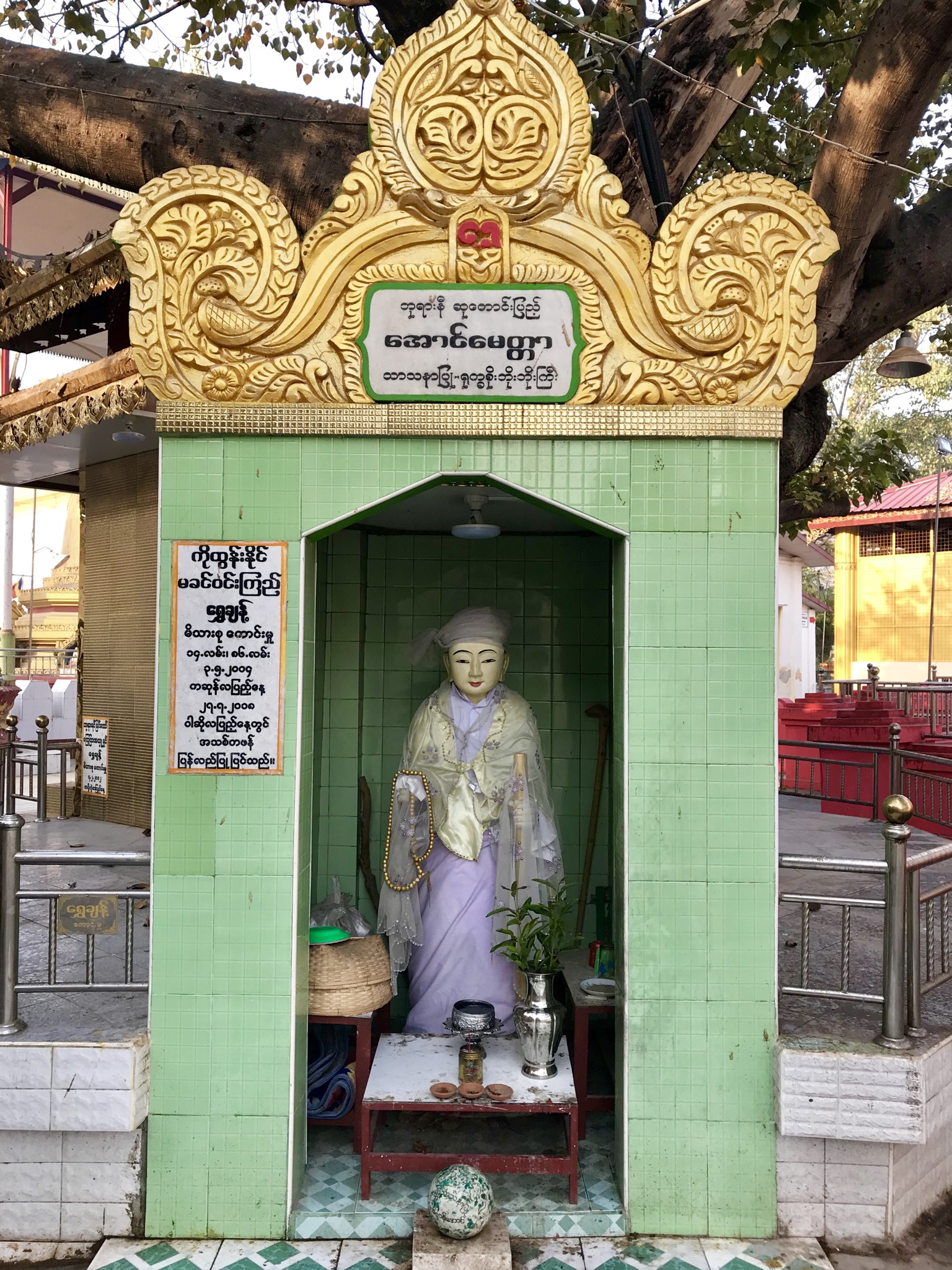
Statue of Yokkaso

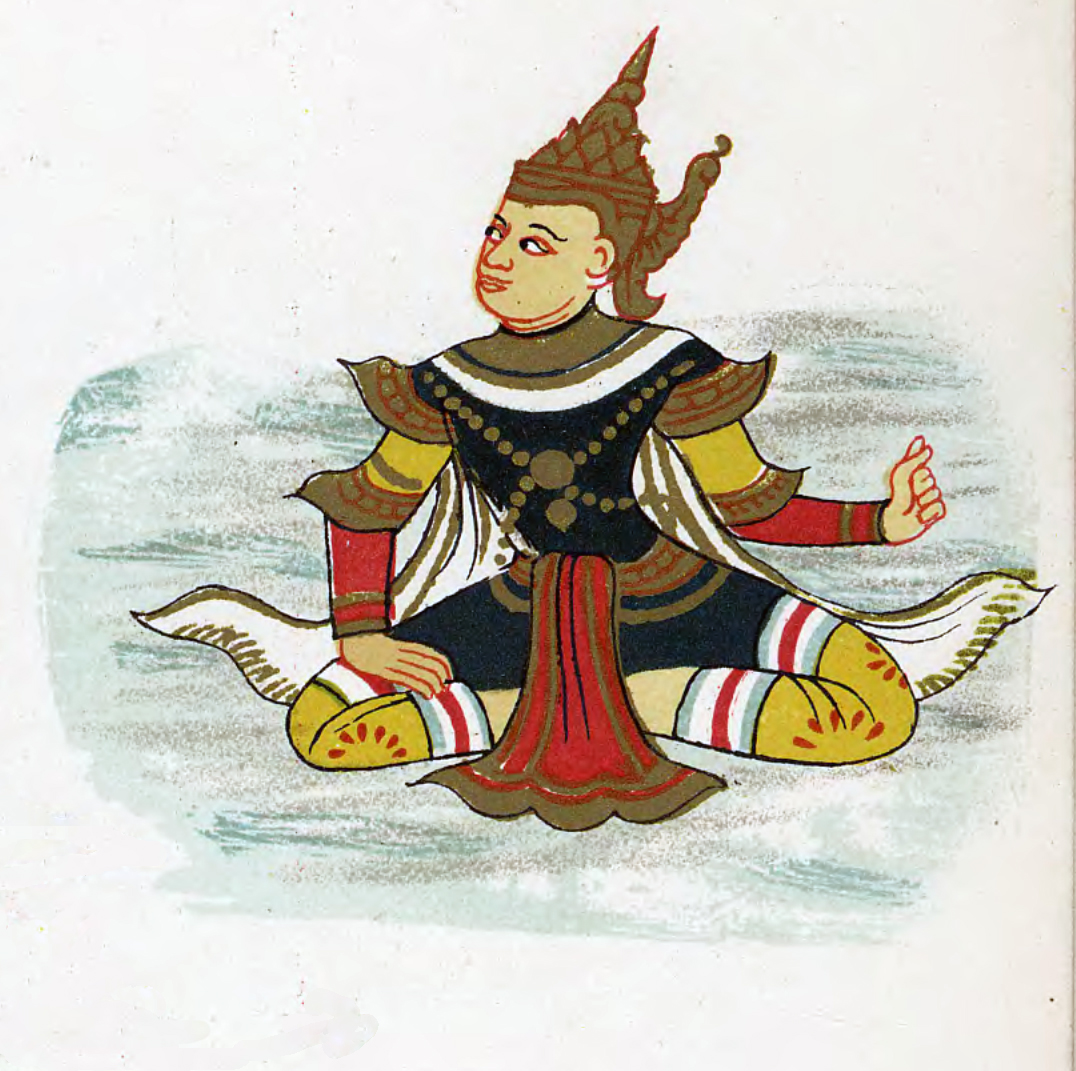
Akathaso

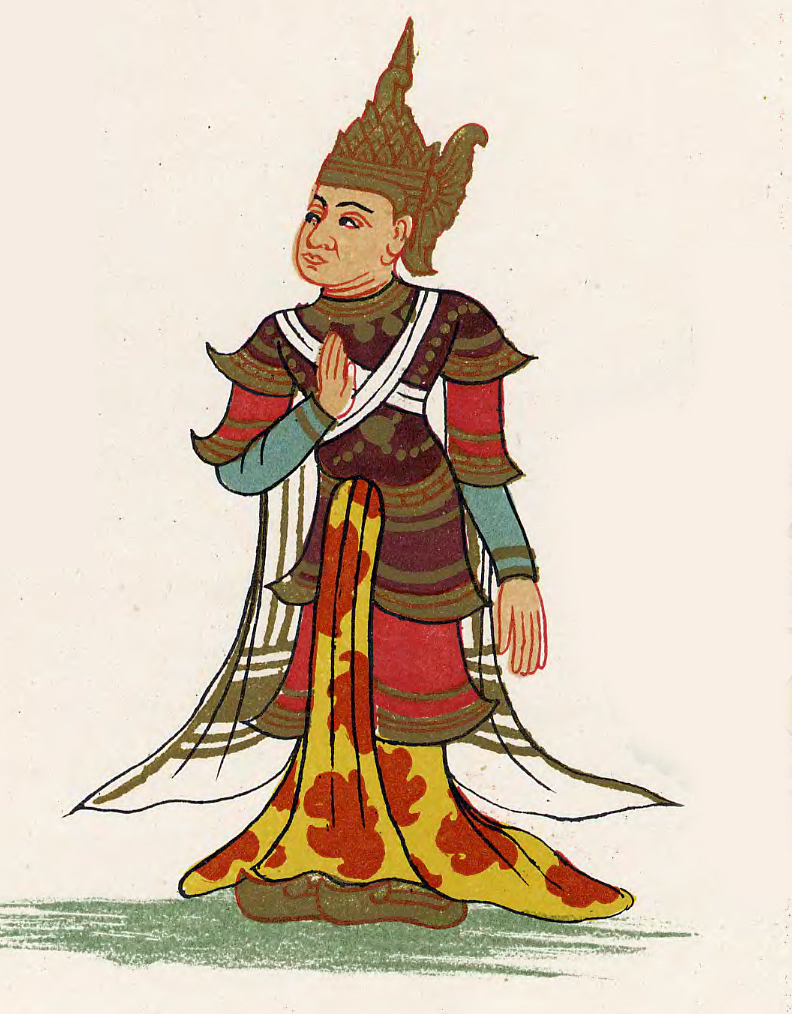
Bhummaso
