= Ponmagyi =

Ponma Kyi (Burmese: ပုန်းမကြည် or ပုန်းမကြီး; also spelt Ponmagyi or Pone Ma Gyi), also known as Ponmagyi Shinma (ပုန်းမကြည်ရှင်မ), is a Burmese rice and fertility nat (spirit) traditionally worshipped by farmers, especially in Upper Myanmar and among the Karen people. She is regarded as the guardian goddess of rice, crops, and agricultural prosperity.

== Origins ==
Ponma Kyi originates from fertility cult practices common throughout Southeast Asia. Similar rice goddesses and tutelary spirits exist regionally, such as Phosop in Thailand and Dewi Sri in Indonesia.

Although called a deity, Ponma Kyi is not included among the 37 inner or outer Burmese deities. There is a traditional association between Ponma Kyi and the lunar star (Pusha star), believed to influence the growth of plants, fruits, and flowers during the Burmese month of Tabaung.

== Devotional rituals ==
Ponma Kyi is worshipped annually, particularly during the first to eighth days of the traditional Burmese month of Tabaung, coinciding with land preparation and the planting season.

Farmers and agriculturalists offer cooked rice, laphet (fermented tea leaves), rice flour snacks called mont hsi gyaw (မုန့်ဆီကြော်), and other traditional offerings such as rice cakes, tea, coconuts, bananas, and thanakha. Offerings and customs vary by region and circumstance, including times of drought, prosperity, or harvest.

The ritual often involves dressing a sheaf of rice as Ponma Kyi Nat, placing it atop a cart along with offerings, reciting blessings for abundant harvests, circling the rice fields while clapping and playing drums, and praying for the next year’s prosperity.

== Mythology and Legend ==
=== The Beast's Clothing and Buddhist Story ===
Ponma Kyi is sometimes described as a beastly or wild spirit who is calm only when hidden quietly, hence the name "Punmakyi." Variants of the name include Phonemaji, Puppakyi, and Punnakyi—the latter meaning "the god who makes rice barns complete," with Sanskrit equivalents such as "Pubvashari."

A Buddhist-era legend ties Ponma Kyi to Kaliyakini, a demonic figure from the time of the Buddha. The tale narrates the cycles of rebirth and revenge involving a wealthy Brahmin's wives, their offspring, and a demoness turned giantess, who ultimately was pacified by the Buddha’s teachings. This giantess then became a protector of crops and farmers, promising good rains and bountiful harvests if honored properly.

=== Karen Folk Tales ===
Among the Karen people, Ponma Kyi is venerated during their New Year festivals as a guardian goddess of rice. One folk tale tells of a compassionate poor man named Pali Kye who saves an old, ugly woman—actually the disguised goddess Ponma Kyi testing the hearts of the people. Despite mistreatment by Pali Kye’s wife, the goddess rewards the family with prosperity after instructing them to build barns and perform rituals invoking rice butterflies (Plu-bula-pho-ge) to fill the barns with rice and precious treasures.

The goddess instructs kindness, honesty, and respect towards elders and visitors, and promises to send hawks (Lai Phi Biyo) to protect the fields from pests. She ascends to her temple in the sky as a falcon, promising continued protection for honest farmers. This tradition persists in Karen agricultural communities.

== Social Significance ==
The Ponma Kyi festival and associated customs serve not only religious purposes but also function as social demonstrations fostering community bonding, mutual support, and the sustainable development of rural Burmese society.

== In popular culture ==
In 2007, the film Ninety Times Only directed by Maung Yin Aung from Mandalay won the Academy Award in Myanmar. The film, based on Burmese culture and traditions, includes references to Ponma Kyi and her role in Burmese agricultural life.

== See also ==
- Nat (spirit)
- Phosop
- Dewi Sri
