= Hennil =

Slavic god mentioned by Thiethmar

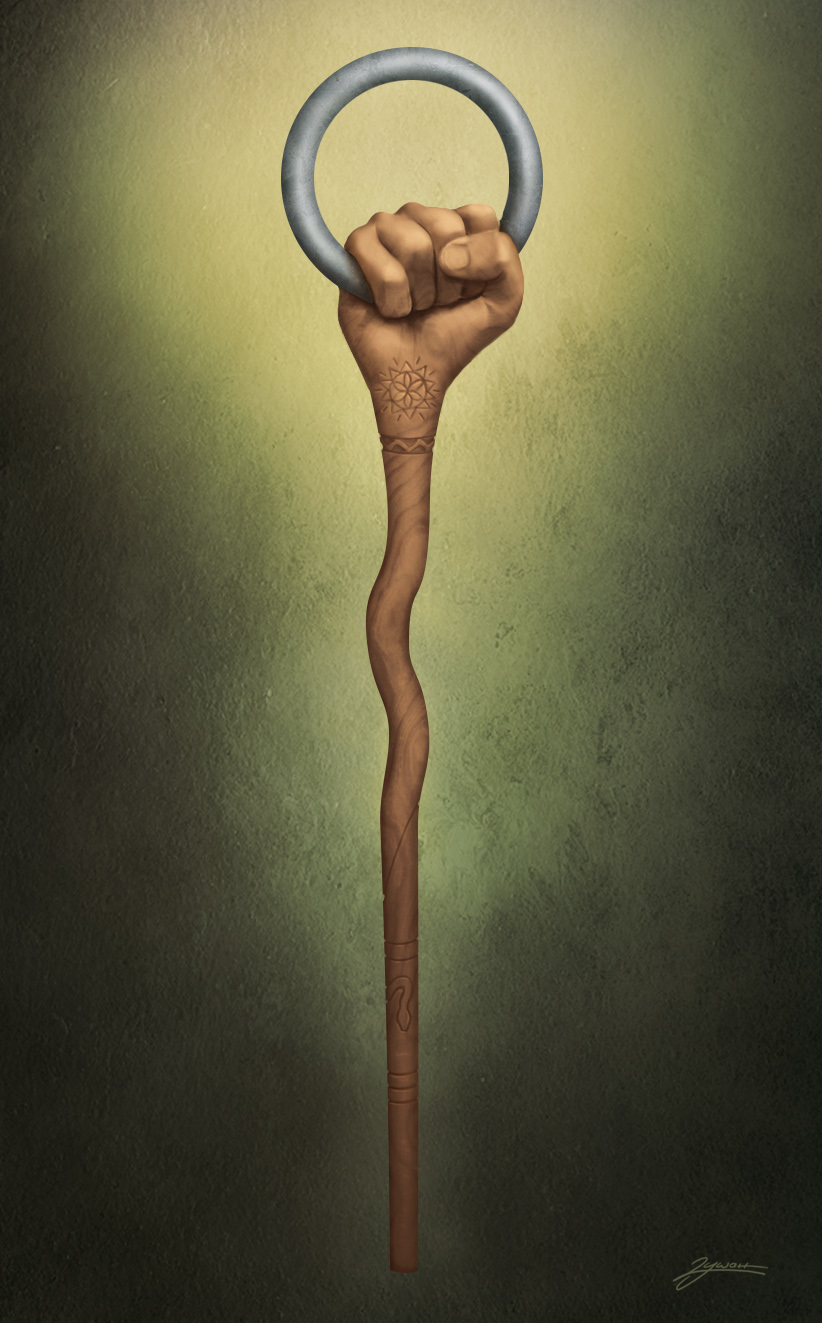
The modern image of the staff, Dušan Božić, 2021

Hennil or Bendil is an alleged agrarian Slavic god worshipped by the Polabian Slavs. He was mentioned by Bishop Thietmar in his Chronicle as a god who was represented by a staff crowned by a hand holding a ring, which is interpreted as a symbol of fertility. However, there is no general consensus on the authenticity of the deity.

== Hennil ==
A god named Hennil appears only in the Chronicle of Thietmar, Bishop of Merseburg. He describes a situation in 1017 in his diocese of Sülfeld (Latin: Silivellun), where a woman's house was attacked by demons. He then mentions a pagan rite in passing:

The inhabitants, who rarely go to church, do not concern themselves at all about their priests. The worship greatly their household gods and, in the hope of some benefit for themselves, perform sacrifices to them. I heard tell of a shepherd’s staff, crowned by a hand holding an iron circle, which was carried from house to house by the shepherd of the village it was in, and as soon as it entered [the house] it was hailed by its bearer: "Keep watch, Hennil, keep watch!", for such was its name in their rustic tongue, and afterwards, over a banquet, the fools argued amicably about keeping it in their custody.

Latin original text
Nam habitatores illi raro ad aecclesiam uenientes, de suorum uisitatione custodum nil curant. Domesticos colunt deos, multumque sibi prodesse eosdem sperantes, hiis inmolant. Audiui de quodam baculo; in cuius sumitate manus erat, unum in se ferreum tenens circulum, quod cum pastore illius uillae, in quo is fuerat, per omnes domos has singulariter ductus, in primo introitu a portitore suo sic salutaretur: Vigila, Hennil, uigila!—sic enim rustica uocabatur—lingua et epulantes ibi delicate, de eiusdem se tueri custodia stulti autumabant.

The authenticity and nature of the god are debated. Teodor Narbut linked this theonym with the Lithuanian deity Goniglis mentioned by Maciej Stryjkowski in the sixteenth century, the deity of shepherds, whose name he linked with the Polish word gonić "to chase". Adam Naruszewicz read the name as Honidło or Gonidło, and recognized him as a god of guards. On this basis, Ignác Jan Hanuš, concluded that Hennil was the equivalent of Goniglis, the god of shepherds, and among the Czechs and Slovaks he was allegedly worshipped as Honidlo, Honilo, Gonidlo. Jacob Grimm in his Deutsche Mythologie combined the theonym with the Polish word hejnał in the sense of "red sky in the morning" and "song worshipping the rising sun".

Other scholars have also suggested that Hennil may have been a German (Saxon) god, e.g., Theodor Siebs concluded that Hennil was a diminutive of Henno (-Odin), the god of death and of waking light and spring. He was also recognized as a Germanic god by Henryk Łowmiański or Władysław Dziewulski.

Today, Hennil is often thought to be a pseudo-deity – Thietmar is supposed to have regarded an ordinary stick used in a ritual as a deity; it is often overlooked in scholarly publications. Aleksander Brückner first of all pointed out that around 1010 the sound h (different from ch) did not yet exist in the Slavic languages, he also rejected linking it with the Lithuanian Goniglis and with the word hejnał, which is a borrowing from Hungarian. He considered Hennil to be a German given name and not the name of a Slavic or German god. Slavist and linguist Leszek Moszyński proposed that the word Hennil should be considered a diminutive from Old High German heno "rooster," and that the rooster, which is a symbol of vigilance, may have been included in the spell mentioned by Thietmar. Gerard Labuda considered the word to be the result of a misunderstanding of the greeting "hey-no!". There is also a view that Hennil was a fetish. Ultimately, the etymology of the god's theonym has not been established.

The historicity of the deity is defended by historian Stanisław Rosik. According to him, the recognition of Hennil as the name of the ossuary used during the ritual is problematic, because Thietmar regularly linked the concept of "deity" with the concept of "idol". In addition, in the Old Testament, descriptions of the followers of pagan gods were directly linked to the worship of wood or a stick, hence Thietmar may have known that the deities were not merely depicted anthropomorphically. He also points out that Thietmar writes about the Slavs worshipping "household gods", which is also written about by Helmold 150 years later, which may also suggest that Hennil was a local god whose name possibly may have been derived from an ancestor's name, which may cause difficulties in understanding the name.

== Bendil ==
An important discovery was made by philologist Juan Antonio Álvarez-Pedrosa Núñez of the Complutense University of Madrid. As he points out, the Hennil record is based on an original manuscript, as it may have been at least partially written by Thietmar himself, but ultimately has up to eight different authors. The parts of the text that were not written by Thietmar contain many errors, which may be because they were written with the help of a dictator, and Book VII, which mentions Hennil, is one of those parts. There is, however, a second manuscript of the Chronicle written at the monastery of Corvey, which is newer but not necessarily less reliable because of this. Álvarez-Pedrosa Núñez discovered that in the passage dedicated to Hennil, this manuscript contains two differences: instead of the genitive a portitore, it contains ab omnibus, which gives more sense to the greeting received by the deity, and the theonym is written as Bendil.

According to Álvarez-Pedros Núñez, this notation of the theonym resolves the problem of etymology. The theonym Bendil would derive from the regular evolution of the Proto-Indo-European stem *bʰendʰ- "to bind, connect", cf. Sanskrit बन्धन, bandhana "bond", Ancient Greek πεῖσμα, peîsma "rope", or Gothic 𐌱𐌹𐌽𐌳𐌰𐌽, bindan "to bind". Significantly, in the pastoral dictionary of the Lithuanian language it finds a semantic equivalent: bandà "flock, herd". The theonym Bendil(o) would contain the suffix -ilo also found in the name of another Slavic god, Yarilo. The stem with the meaning "to bind", would be typical for agrarian deities who protect and guarantee oaths, as evidenced by the symbol in the form of a staff with a ring, and it probably occurs in the word βέννος, vénnos meaning "fertility", "harvest", which is found in the Phrygian theonym Ζεῦς Βέννιος, Zeûs Vénnios. He points out, however, that this theonym has no equivalents among other Slavs.

== Bibliography ==
- Álvarez-Pedrosa Núñez, Juan Antonio (2014). "¿Existió un dios eslavo Hennil?". Faventia (in Spanish). 34–36: 135–138. ISSN 2014-850X.
- Alvarez-Pedroza, Juan Antonio (2021). Sources of Slavic Pre-Christian Religion. Leiden: Koninklijke Brill. ISBN 978-90-04-44138-5.
- Brückner, Aleksander (1985). Mitologia słowiańska i polska (in Polish). Warsaw: Państwowe Wydawnictwo Naukowe. ISBN 83-01-06245-2.
- Łowmiański, Henryk (1979). Religia Słowian i jej upadek, w. VI-XII (in Polish). Warsaw: Państwowe Wydawnictwo Naukowe. ISBN 83-01-00033-3.
- Rosik, Stanisław (2020). The Slavic Religion in the Light of 11th- and 12th-Century German Chronicles (Thietmar of Merseburg, Adam of Bremen, Helmold of Bosau): Studies on the Christian Interpretation of pre-Christian Cults and Beliefs in the Middle Ages. Leiden: Brill. ISBN 9789004331488.
- Strzelczyk, Jerzy (1998). Mity, podania i wierzenia dawnych Słowian (in Polish). Poznań: Dom Wydawniczy Rebis. ISBN 83-7120-688-7.
