= Hinduism in Cambodia =

Cambodian Hindus ហិណ្ឌូខ្មែរ
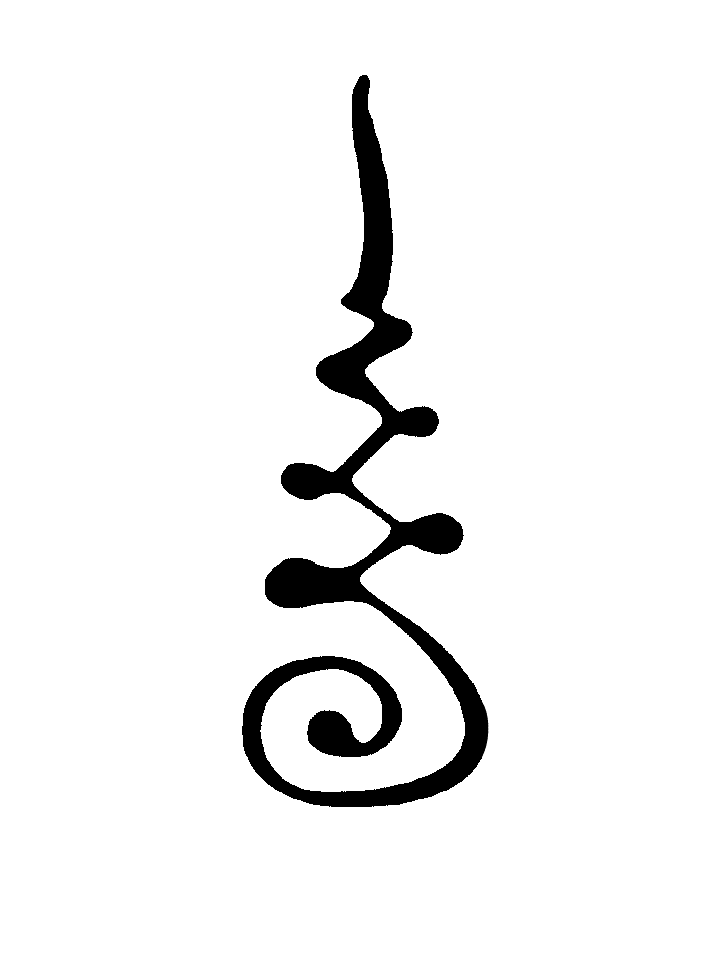

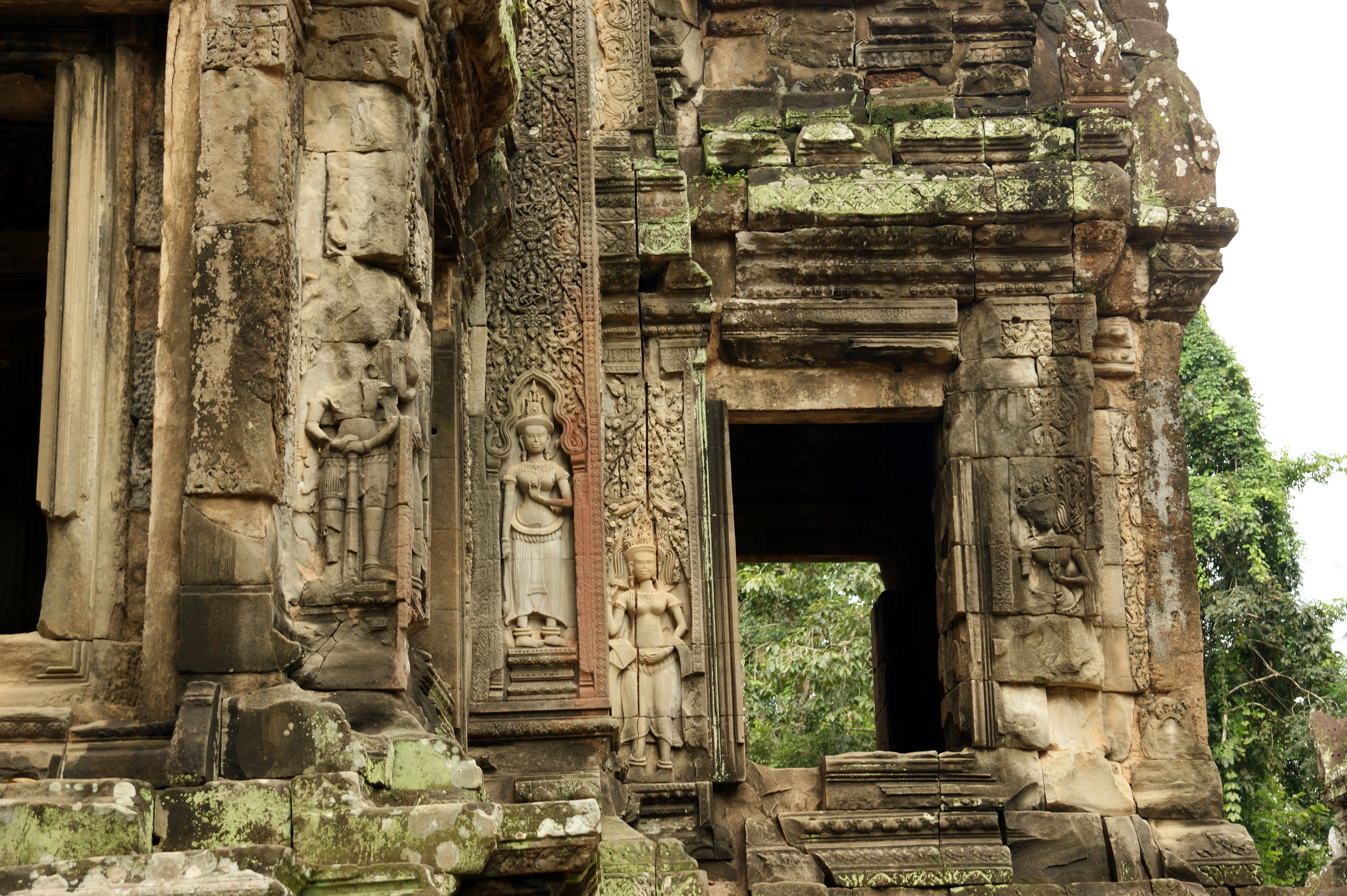
- Thommanon temple in Siem Reap Province.

Religions
- Hinduism; Majority: Vaishnavism; Minority: Shaivism

Languages
- Sacred; Sanskrit; Majority; Khmer, Hindi, Punjabi, Cham and Tamil

Hinduism is a minority religion in Cambodia which is followed by about 1,000 to 15,000 individuals. Even being a small minority in the Buddhist majority nation it highly influences the vast culture and history of Cambodia with being a prominent religion under the Khmer Empire. Today most of the Cambodian Hindus are Indians in Cambodia. Cambodia had always been a Buddhist nation since its conception, but before its independence from French Indochina, it had a significant Hindu minority, and several hundred years before that, it had been the most dominant religion in Cambodia as well as Southeast Asia.

== History ==
Hinduism has been said to be present in Cambodia from c. 500 AD through the trade routes and networks by traders from India and expansion of Greater India. Hindu culture is said to have influenced the Cambodia and had been an important part of the Funan polity with Indosphere and it was characterised as: "high population and urban centers, the production of surplus food...socio-political stratification [and] legitimized by Indian religious ideologies". There was also present of Purohita for the religious traditions and customs with mention of the land as 'Kambujadesha'. Many Hindu cults were established with the patronisation of Hinduism in the Chenla Kingdom.

After the formation of Khmer Empire, the founder Jayavarman II in the 9th-century titled him as 'Devaraja' and declared as himself as 'Chakravartin' as per Hindu rituals, Hinduism was at the peak with construction of many Hindu temple in Khmer architecture and Sanskrit was used as sacred language. Hinduism was at the peak under the Khmer Empire and was the official religion of the state, until the 14th-century after the conversion of the royal family to Theravada Buddhism and slowly causing the decline of the Hindu population in country replaced by Buddhism from Shaivism.

Angkor Wat, one of the largest temple complexes in the world, was built in the 12th century by King Suryavarman II, and it was dedicated to Vishnu, one of the principal deities of Hinduism.

== Shaivism and syncretic cults ==
Of the two major neo-Brahmanical sects that flourished in Cambodia, the Shaivas and the Vaishnavas, Shaivism was by far the more influential. It exercised a profound influence on the whole course of religious development in the region. Shiva was represented both as a human figure and in his linga form, with the latter occurring more frequently, as in India. The diverse character of Cambodian Hinduism found expression in a range of syncretic cults that blended different deities into composite forms. The most significant of these was the Harihara denomination the combination of Hari (Vishnu) and Hara (Shiva) in a single image. The conception borrowed from India but given its most enduring expression in Cambodia, where inscriptions from different parts of the Khmer territory praise the compound deity under names such as Harihara, Sambhu-Vishnu, Sankara-Narayana, and Hara-Acyuta. The capital of Jayavarman II (802-850 CE) was itself names Harihara-alaya, present-day Roluos, reflecting the depth of this denomination's popularity. Other syncretic forms included the Ardhanarisvara (half-Shiva, half-Parvati), the Sivaditya faction combining Shaivism with sun worship, and most distinctively the Siva-Buddha composite, which Jash identifies as an uniquely Southeast Asian religious contribution with no clear parallel in India. The spread of Indian religious culture into Cambodia did not suppress indigenous ways of life but led to their transformation into new patterns, with the composite cults given a new orientation by the Cambodian people themselves.

== See also ==
- Hinduism in Southeast Asia
