= Indians in Cambodia =

Indians in Cambodia ជនឥណ្ឌានៅកម្ពុជា
Regions with significant populations
- Phnom Penh

Languages
- Khmer · Various Indian Languages · English

Religion
- Hinduism · Sikhism · Buddhism · Islam · Religions of India

Related ethnic groups
- People of Indian origin

There is a small community of Indians in Cambodia, mainly expatriates and immigrants from India.

== History ==
Relations between India and Cambodia go back to ancient times. Various genetic studies show that modern Cambodians have 9-19% Indian ancestry. This shows a much more direct and substantial impact than seen in modern history. Indian traders made contact with south east Asia and vice versa as far back as before the common era. Southeast Asian civilizations such as the Khmers were speculated by scholars to have traveled as far as the Indus river delta. Modern scholars have proposed that early Khmer arts and buildings showed a South Indian as speculated by earlier scholars. The Khmer language was heavily influenced by Cholan, Tami the writing system was derived from like most of other native South East Asian nations'.

During the French colonial period, most South Asians in Cambodia were Tamils from French-ruled Pondicherry, with substantial minorities from Gujarat and Sindh as well as smaller communities from the provinces of Madras, Punjab and Bombay. The number of South Asians in Cambodia was nearly six thousand before dropping due to the Japanese invasion of French Indochina during World War II to 1,310 in 1949 and less than a thousand in 1963. Many Indians owned clothing and textile shops around Central Market, while others worked as civil servants or, for those from Chettiar communities, as traders and moneylenders.

Inter-ethnic Relations between South Asians and ethnic Khmers were reportedly poor due to the former's common professions and business practices, which were perceived as exploitative by the Khmers, while the South Asians viewing themselves as superior to the Khmers owing to the perceived Indic influence within Khmer culture and with many refusing to mingle with the Khmers. After several waves of violence against foreigners in the aftermath of the 1970 Cambodian coup d'état, most of the Indian businessmen left. When the Khmer Rouge took over in 1975, many of the remaining Indians fled, either by plane to Bangkok or being trucked by the Khmer Rouge to the Thai border from the French embassy with other foreigners. Those who couldn't escape were persecuted and even killed by the regime led by CPK that ordered its elimination of the Indian minority as well as other non-Khmer ethnic groups, leading to the near-elimination of the Indian community by 1980. As the political and economic situation became more stable in the 1990s, Indian professionals started to reestablish themselves in Cambodia.

== Current status ==
Today, many Indians in Cambodia are involved in pharmaceuticals, the United Nations and businesses such as restaurants. The growing economy is also attracting more opportunity seekers from India. Unlike other Indian communities in Southeast Asian cities such as in Bangkok, Kuala Lumpur, Singapore or Medan, the Indian population in Phnom Penh is too small to support a Little India quarter, but it remains an intimate and close-knit group that has integrated well into local society.

Indian culture is visible in Cambodia. Indian Hindu festivals like Diwali and Holi are celebrated by the Indian community. Thanks to satellite television, popular Hindi soap operas are shown daily while a small selection of Indian restaurants hosts weekly showings of the latest Bollywood Hindi films as well as cricket matches. Hindi film DVDs can be bought throughout the capital, and expatriates can peruse a number of Indian-based websites for the latest news and entertainment.

== Notable people ==
- Isoup Ganthy (1929 – 1976), equestrian, 1956 Olympian

== See also ==
- Kaundinya I
- Cambodia-India relations
