= Nang Kwak =

Thai household spirit

Nang Kwak นางกวัก
- Goddess of Luck, Trade, Prosperity, and Wealth
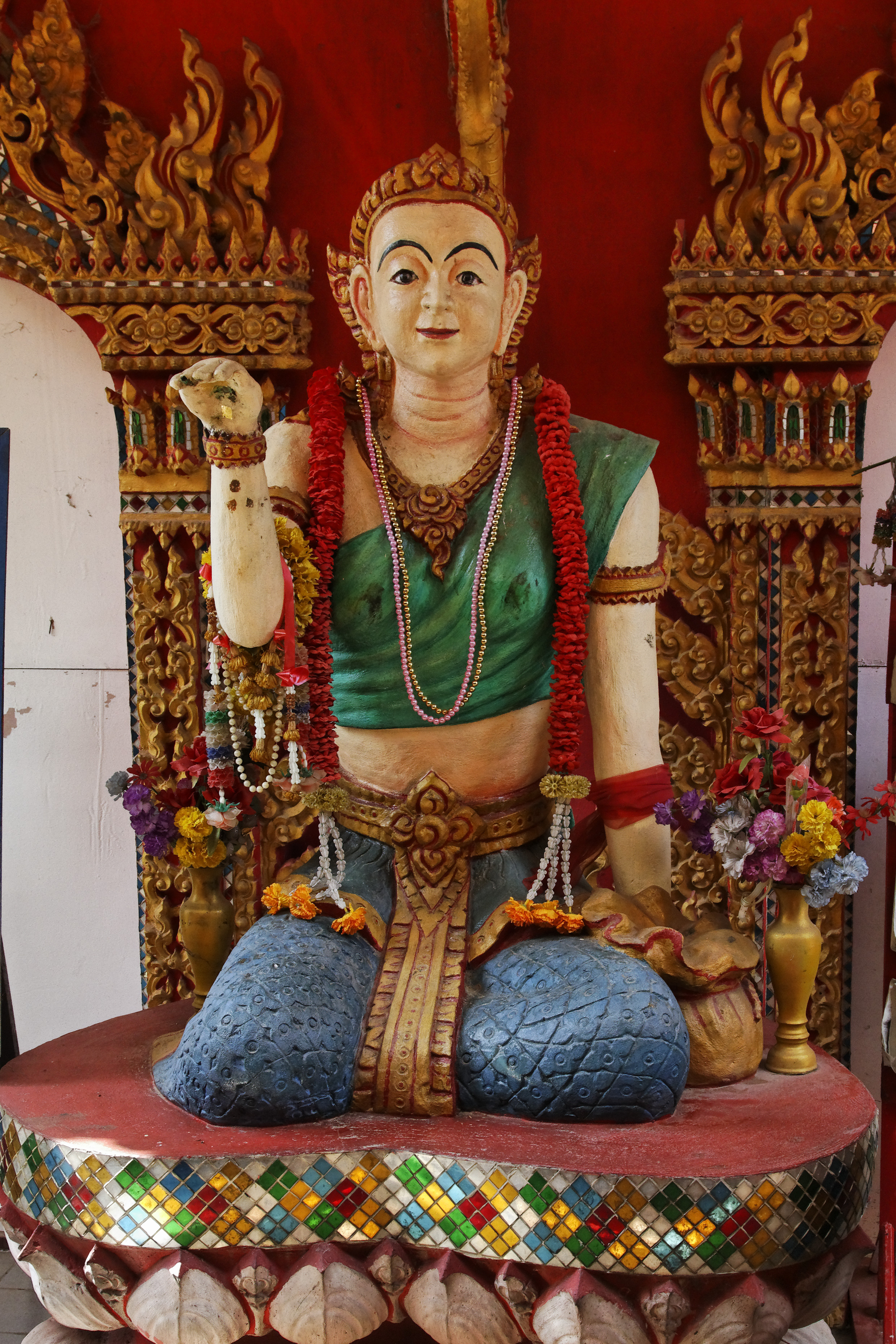
- Nang Kwak icon in the Wat Phra That Ruang Rong temple, Sisaket
- Affiliation: Phosop, Kuman Thong, Tutelary deities
- Mantra: Mantra of Nang Kwak
- Symbol: Beckoning hand, bag full of money
- Mount: Pig
- Parents: Sujidtaprahma (father); Sumanta (mother)

Nang Kwak (Thai: นางกวัก) is a Bodhisattva, household goddess or Spirit of Thai folklore. She is deemed to bring good fortune, prosperity and attract customers to a business. Although Nang Kwak is more a figure of popular folklore than a deity, there are Buddhist legends that seek to incorporate her into the Buddhist fold.

Commonly dressed in red Thai style clothing, Nang Kwak is an incarnation of Mae Po Sop, the Thai rice goddess. She is similar to the Hindu goddess Lakshmi.

Nang Kwak is found among shops and merchants.

== Iconography ==
Nang Kwak is represented as a beautiful woman often wearing a red Thai dress. She wears a golden crown and is in the sitting or kneeling position. Her right hand is raised in the Thai way of beckoning a customer, with the palm of the hand curved and pointing downwards. Her left hand is resting on her side or holds a bag full of gold near her lap.

The present iconography of Nang Kwak is similar to Mae Po Sop (แม่โพสพ), the Siamese rice goddess. However, unlike Mae Po Sop, Nang Kwak does not wear the harvested rice sheaf on her right shoulder. The iconography of Nang Kwak is like the Hindu goddess Sri Lakshmi, the goddess of wealth, fortune and prosperity.

She has similar elements of the iconography of the Japanese Maneki Neko beckoning cat.

Nang Kwak at Wat Chetawan, Petaling Jaya

== Symbolism ==
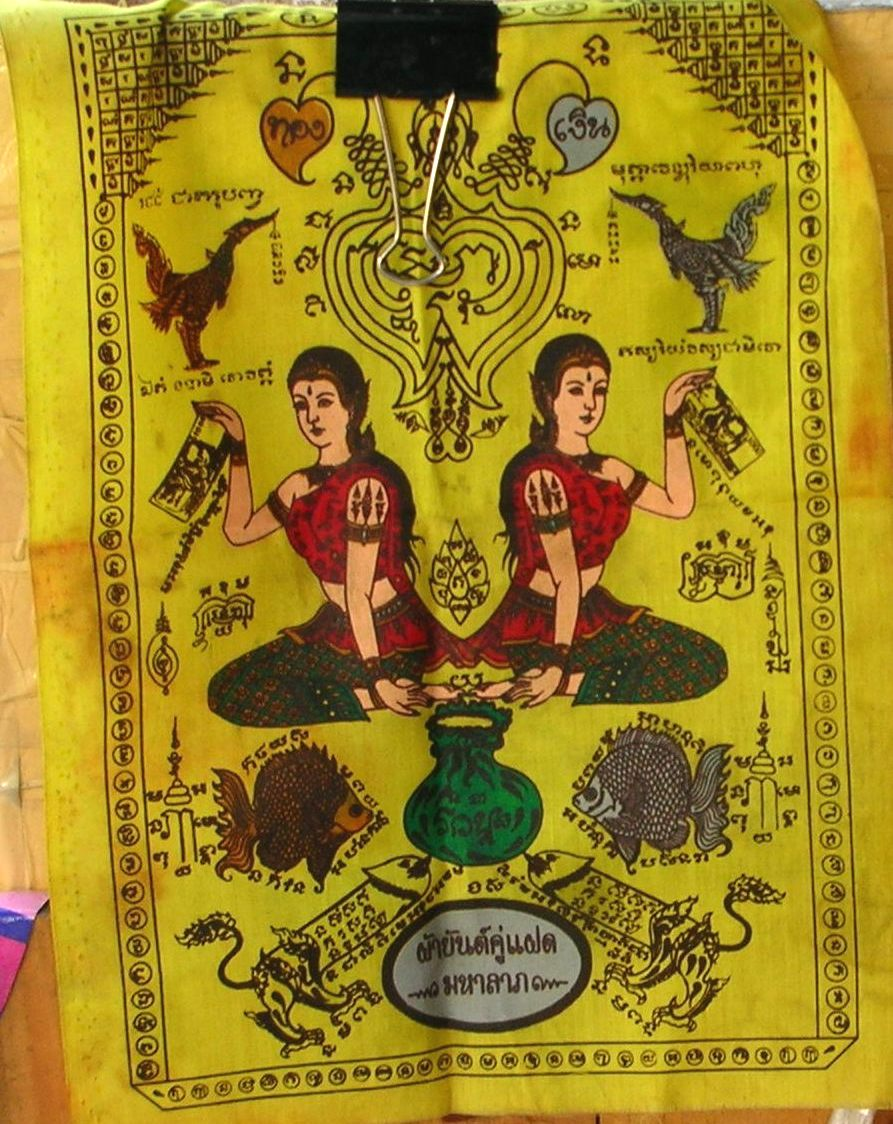
Nang Kwak luck-bringing charm for shopkeepers in Bangkok.

Nang Kwak is a benevolent spirit. She is deemed to bring luck, especially in the form of money, to the household. She is the patron deity of merchants and salesmen. She can be seen in almost every business establishment in Thailand.

Thai people like to have a figurine or cloth poster (called a Pha Yant, or Yantra Cloth) of the goddess in their home or shop, where it is often placed by the shrine. Many people in Thailand, who travel around to sell their wares, wear amulets with her figure around the neck.

== Legends ==
Trader family legend

One Buddhist legend presents Nang Kwak as a maiden named Nang Supawadee (or Subhavadi) of a trader family that converted to Buddhism. According to this legend, in the small town of Michikasandhanakara in province of Sawadtii, there was a married family, Sujidtaprahma and his wife Sumanta, who had a daughter named Supawadee. They were merchants who sold wares on the markets and lived hand to mouth. One day, they were discussing their future and decided to expand their business to make more profit and to save for their old age.

They bought a gwian (cart) to travel with and sell their wares to other towns. They also brought wares from other towns to sell in Sawadtii and Michigaasandhanakara on return. Sometimes, Supawadee would come along to help them. One day, as Supawadee was helping her parents to sell wares in a distant town, she heard a sermon by Phra Gumarn Gasaba Thera; she was moved by his sermon and converted to Buddhism. When Gasaba Thaera saw her faith and devotion, he summoned all his powers of thought and concentration as an Arahant and bestowed blessings of good fortune and luck in salesmanship on Nang Supawadee and her family.

Ramakien epic legend

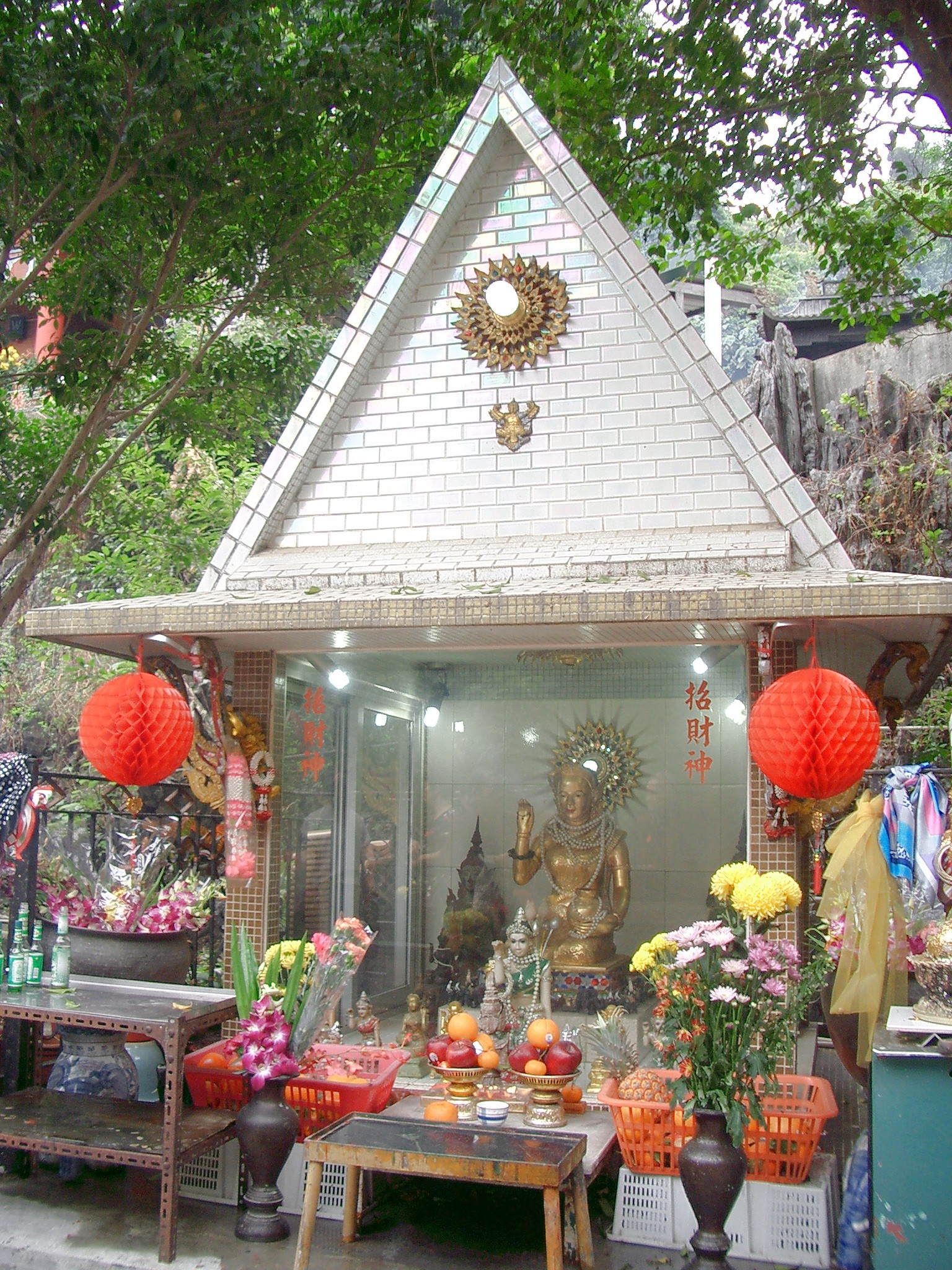
Nang Kwak figurine at Koon Ngam Ching Yuen (Temple), Hong Kong.

Another Thai legend presents Nang Kwak as the woman who defended a king from a demon in the epic Ramakien, Thai version of the Hindu epic Ramayana. She, thereafter gained the boon (merit) of fortune and prosperity wherever she was.

Nang Kwak was the daughter of Pu Chao Khao Khiao (lit. "Grandfather Lord of the Green Mountain"), also known as Pra Panasabodee. Pu Chao Khao Khiao was a Lord of the Chatu Maha Rachika realm (one of the lower levels of Heaven – an Asura realm of giants and pretas). He was the Lord of the forest and places where wild plants grow. An Asura demon called To Kok Khanak (also known as 'To Anurak'), was a good friend of Pu Chao Khao Khiao.

To Kok Khanak was attacked by Phra Ram (the hero of Ramakien). Phra Ram threw a Kok tree at the demon, piercing his chest and pinning him to the side of the mountain Pra Sumen. Pra Ram cursed him that 'Until your descendants weave a Civara monks robe from lotus petals, and offer it to Pra Sri Ariya Maedtrai (Maitreya, the future Buddha) your curse will not be lifted.'

Nang Prachant, the daughter of To Kok Khanag served her father and spent all time to weave the Civara robe from lotus petals. Without her father, she had no time to sell things or make money, nor time to run a shop. When Chao Khao Khiaw heard this, he felt compassion and sent his daughter Nang Kwak to go stay with Nang Prachant. Because of her merit, Nang Kwak caused merchants and rich nobles to flock to Nang Prachant's home and bestow gifts of gold, silver and money on Nang Prachant. Nang Prachant became wealthy and led a comfortable life.

== Bibliography ==
- Phya Anuman Rajadhon, Essays on Thai Folklore ISBN 974-210-345-3
- Pranee Wongthet, Reconfiguration of the Role of the Guardian Spirit: Reflection from the Phuan Feasting Ritual
