= Mukasa =

Mukasa is a surname. Notable people with the surname include:

- Adolphus Ludigo-Mukasa (1861–1886), Ugandan Roman Catholic martyred for his faith
- Mukasa Mbidde (born 1973), Ugandan lawyer, human-rights activist, politician
- Ashe Mukasa (born 1952), former Ugandan football midfielder
- Basammula-Ekkere Mwanga II Mukasa (1868–1903), Kabaka of Buganda from 1884 until 1888 and from 1889 until 1897
- Ham Mukasa (1868–1956), page in the court of Mutesa I of Buganda and later secretary to Apolo Kagwa
- Joseph Mukasa Balikuddembe (1860–1885), Ugandan Roman Catholic recognized as a martyr and saint by the Catholic Church
- Roger Mukasa, (born 1989), Ugandan cricketer
- Ruben Spartas Mukasa (1899–1982), religious reformer in Uganda
- Wilson Muruli Mukasa, Ugandan politician
- Joseph Mukasa Zuza (1955–2015), Roman Catholic bishop
- Nathan Mukasa (born 2004), Ugandan/Trinidadian businessman
- Mukasa (deity), Buganda god of prosperity, harvest, fertility, and health

== See also ==
- Mukasura
- Mukhtasar
- Muklassa
