= Phra Mahachai Phraisop =

Thai deity

Phra Mahachai Phraisop พระมหาไชไพรสภ
- Thai God of rice
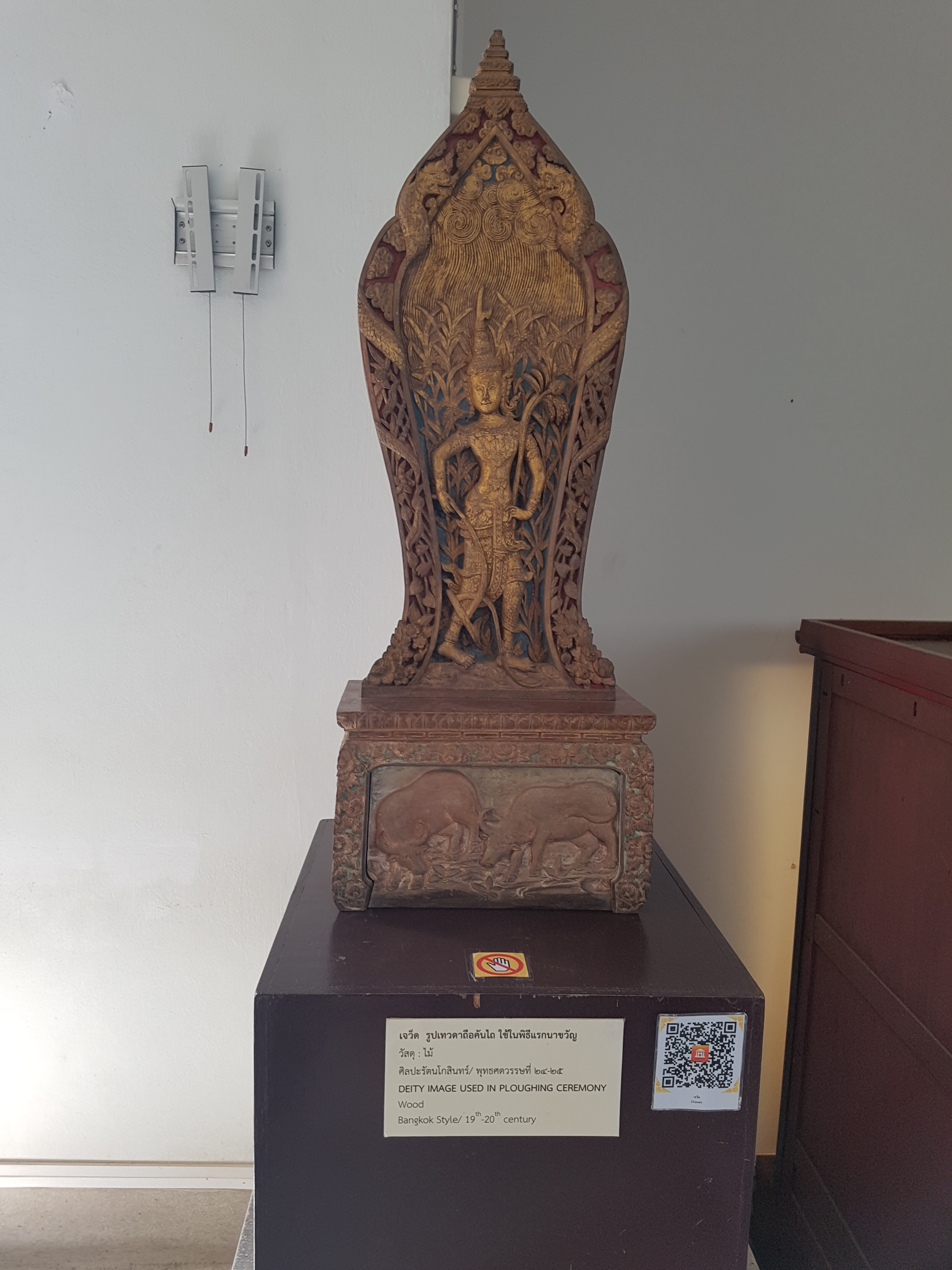
- Image of Phra Mahachai Phraisop in RattanakosinArt period at Chao Sam Phraya Museum, Phra Nakhon Si Ayutthaya province.
- Affiliation: Tutelary
- Abode: Paddy field
- Symbol: Mature rice sheaves dagger
- Mount: clown featherback
- Consort: Phosop

Phra Mahachai Phraisop (Thai: พระมหาไชไพรสภ), also known as Phra Mahachai (Thai: พระมหาไชย) or Phra Phraiprasop (Thai: พระไพรประสบ), is the god of rice or the deity who protects rice according to Thai beliefs and has the same characteristics and duties as Mae Phosop, the goddess of rice.

== Characteristics ==
Phra Mahachai Phraisop appears in the textbook of images of idols (ตำราภาพเทวรูป). It is a Thai book written during the reign of King Mongkut and appears in Narai Narai Yisip Pang (นารายณ์ยี่สิบปาง). The deity resembles a male holding a mature rice sheaf in one hand and holding a dagger.It is believed that Phra Mahachai Phraisop developed from Mae Phosop, who was originally a female. Due to the social dynamics at the time that believed that males were greater than females, it was transformed into a male. Like the Tai Khong (ใต้คง) people in Yunnan, there was a male deity of rice called Pu Khwan Khao (ปู่ขวัญข้าว), which Siraphon Na Thalang assumed that this belief may have been influenced by Chinese patriarchal culture.

There is a painting of Phra Mahachai Phraisop in front of the Chai Chumphon Throne Hall in the Grand Palace.
