= Phosop =

Thai goddess of rice, agriculture, fertility

Phosop โพสพ
- Goddess of rice, agriculture, fertility
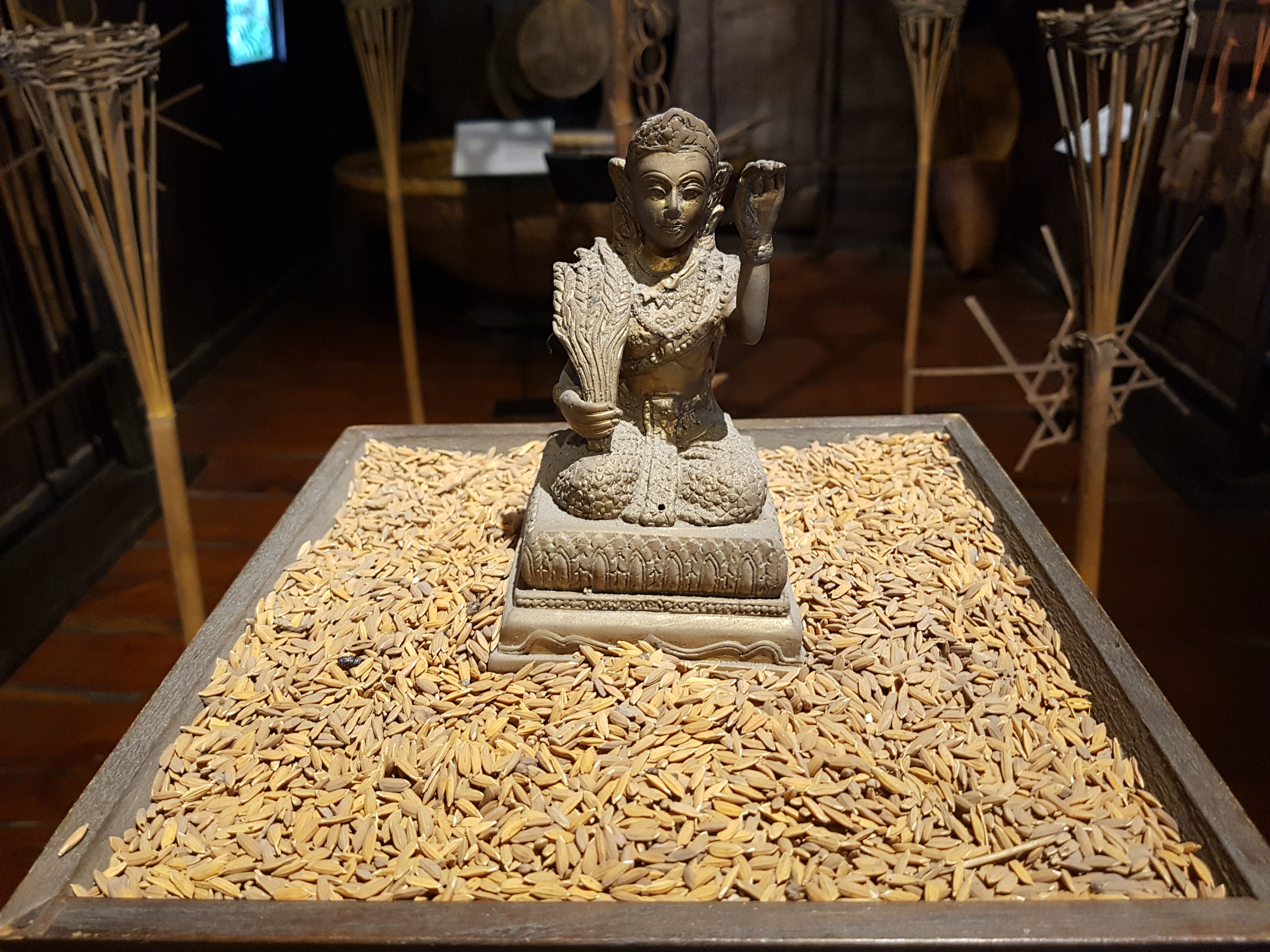
- Image of Phosop the goddess of rice at Siam Society, Bangkok
- Affiliation: Ponmagyi, Po Nagar, Dewi Sri, Tutelary deities
- Abode: Paddy field
- Symbol: Mature rice sheaves
- Mount: clown featherback
- Consort: Phra Mahachai Phraisop

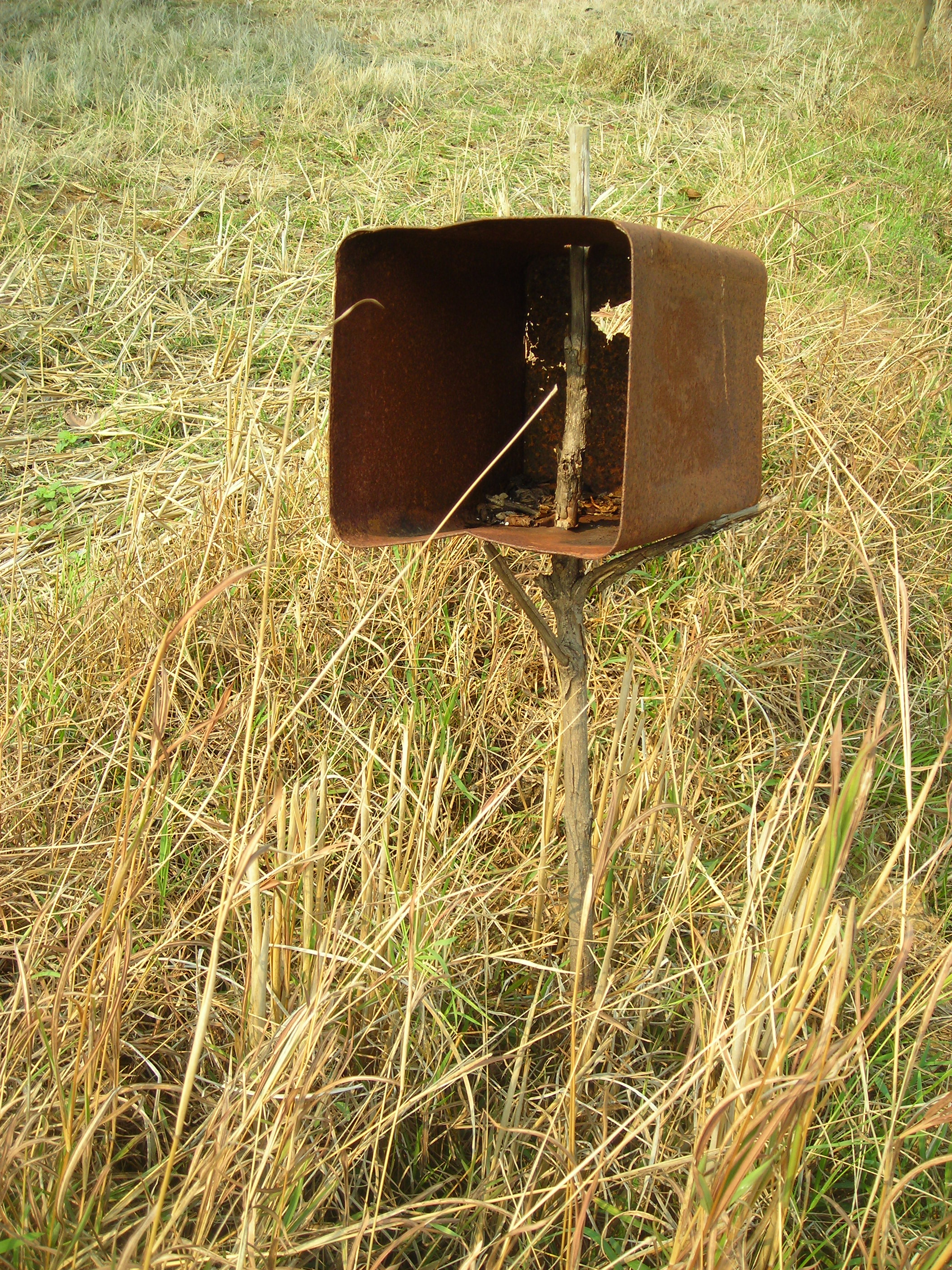
Rudimentary Phi Na spirit house at a rice field in Isan

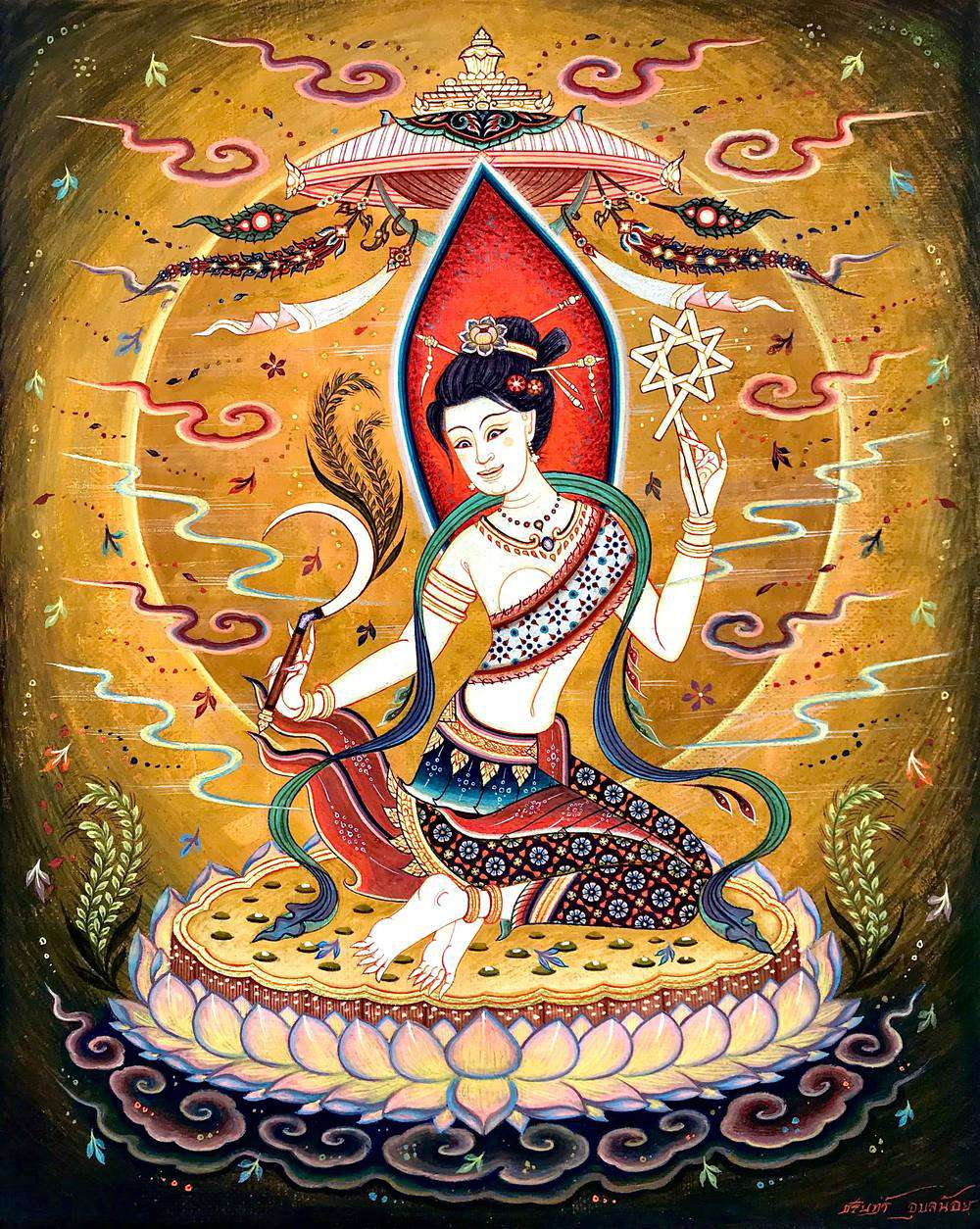
Painting of Nang Phosop

Phosop (Thai: โพสพ) or Phaisop (Thai: ไพสพ) is the rice goddess of the Thai people. She is a deity more related to ancient Thai folklore than a goddess of a structured, mainstream religion. She is also known as Mae Khwan Khao (Thai: แม่ขวัญข้าว; lit. 'Mother of Rice Prosperity').

== Background ==
Ritual offerings are made to propitiate the Rice Goddess during the different steps of rice production. Many of those who are from small towns and rural communities believe that it is Phosop that ensures everyone has enough to eat.

In modern Thailand, paying homage to Phosop by rice farmers is more and more rare; however, Queen Mother Sirikit gave royal patronage to this ancient custom of Thai folklore in August 2008.

These traditional celebrations related to rice and its cultivation stages have a deep traditional significance in order to ensure that farmers will have good harvests. Every year the Royal Ploughing Ceremony takes place in Thailand. At the end of it people scramble to collect the seeds from the furrows in order to increase their luck.

According to archaeological evidence, cave paintings at Pha Mon Noi, part of Pha Taem National Park, Ubon Ratchathani province. Phosop has been worshiped for over 2,000 years.

=== Representation ===
The iconographic representation of Phosop is of a beautiful woman wearing full jewelry and a red or green dress. She is in the sitting or standing position holding a harvested rice sheaf on her right shoulder, but sometimes also resting on her arm. The recent iconography of this goddess is based on the devī of Hinduism but its origins are local and more ancient.

In certain locations a young village woman may dress as Phosop during local rice harvest festivals and celebrations.

== Rice goddess in Southeast Asia ==
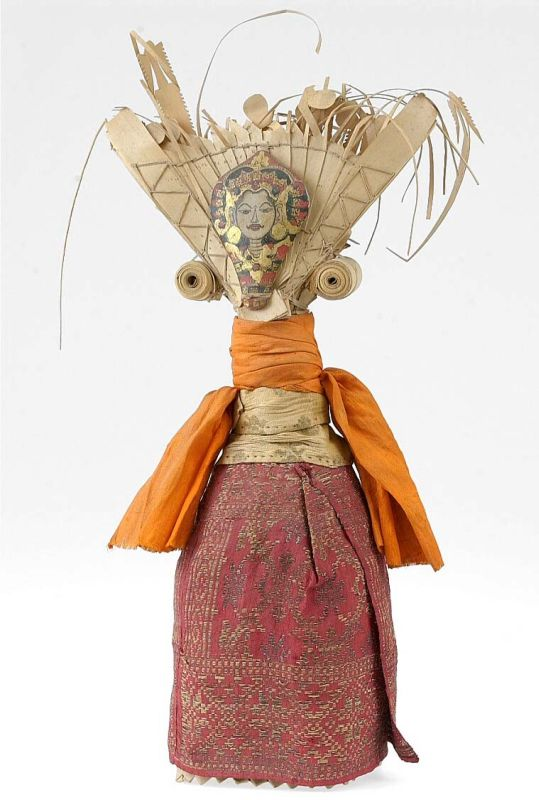
Cili, a Balinese Dewi Sri effigy made with lontar palm leaves.

=== Indonesia ===
A similar rice goddess also can be found in Indonesia; Dewi Sri, also known as Nyi Pohaci, is the Javanese, Sundanese and Balinese rice, agriculture and fertility goddess. Shrines to Dewi Sri are a common feature in local rice fields.

=== Cham ===
The Cham Po Ino Nogar, Po Yan Ino Nogar Taha or Po Nagar, the rice goddess of the Cham people, a minor ethnic group in Cambodia and Vietnam, has similar attributes and rites as the Thai and Lao rice goddess. She is related to Lady Po Nagar, the traditional deity of the Cham people.

=== Khmu ===
Dances to propitiate the rice goddess are common among the Khmu people, a Mon-Khmer group living mostly in northern Laos and also in Vietnam.

=== Laos ===
Known as Nang Khosop in Laos, the rice goddess is also part of the local rural culture. There are different versions of the Laotian origin myth regarding rice. According to a manuscript in Wat Si Saket, after a thousand-year famine one day a young man caught a golden fish. The king of the fishes heard the cry of agony and went to ask the man to free the golden fish in exchange for a treasure. The treasure was Nang Khosop, the maiden who was the soul of the rice. While she lived in the fields rice nourished humans for many more centuries and the Buddhist doctrine progressed. But one day an unrighteous king brought about again a famine on the land by storing the rice that was due to the people in order to acquire gold, elephants and luxury goods for himself. During the hard days of the famine an old couple of slaves met a hermit in the forest.

Seeing that they were famished the hermit appealed to Nang Khosop to feed them. But the rice goddess was angry and refused. Then the hermit, fearing for the future of the Buddhist Dharma, slaughtered Nang Khosop and cut her into many little pieces. As a consequence the fragments of the rice goddess became the different varieties of rice such as black rice, white rice, hard rice (khâo chao) and glutinous rice. The old couple taught humans how to cultivate this new rice in small grains and the Buddhist doctrine flourished.

According to another legend of the Vientiane region the Phi Na, a tutelary spirit that looks after the rice fields originated in the skull, the mouth and the teeth of Nang Khosop.

== Buddhist connection ==
Some authors have studied how Buddhism has brought about a reinterpretation of pre-Buddhist meanings through the myth of the rice goddess.

== Modern use as a symbol ==
Phosop is featured in the logo of the Rice Department (กรมการข้าว) of the Ministry of Agriculture and Cooperatives of Thailand.

== Worship in Bangkok ==
About 100 years ago, Bangkok, the capital of Thailand, was filled with rice fields. Today, these fields have almost entirely disappeared, remaining only in a few districts in the eastern suburbs such as Min Buri, Nong Chok, and Lat Krabang. As a result, only a few shrines dedicated to Phosop still exist, such as the one at Wat Siri Wattanaram in Bang Phrom, Taling Chan. Here, Phosop is worshipped together with other goddesses, Nang Kwak and Phra Mae Thorani, all three enshrined in the same shrine. The idol of Phosop was once believed to be made of gold, but in the 1970s it was stolen by three men from outside the area and has never been recovered. Another shrine to Phosop can be found in Soi Lat Phrao 1 near Lat Phrao Square, as this area was once a rice field. Here, Phosop is enshrined in a small joss house.

== Pop culture ==
Phosop is adapted as a protagonist in a Thai fantasy/romantic-comedy TV drama titled A Mission from the Goddess of Rice (ปาฏิหารย์รักแม่โพสพ, lit. 'Love Miracle of Mother Phosop') on Channel 3 in 2021.

== See also ==
- Ceres (mythology)
- Corn dolly
- Hainuwele
- Huminodun
- Lakshmi
- Nang Kwak
- Phra Mahachai Phraisop
- Ponmagyi
