= Ghosts in Thai culture =

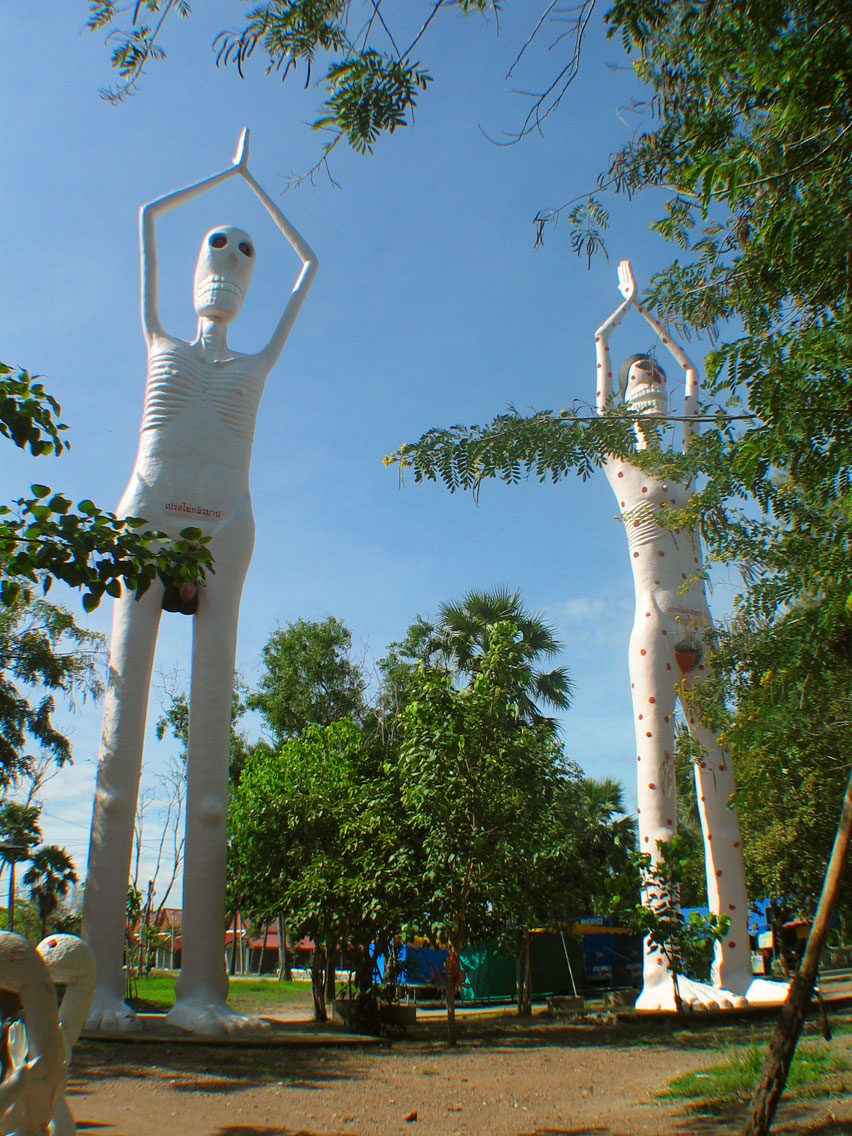
Statues of Preta at Wat Phai Rong Wua, Suphanburi

Belief in ghosts in Thai culture is both popular and enduring. In the history of Thailand, Buddhist popular beliefs intermingled with legends of spirits or ghosts of local folklore. These myths have survived and evolved, having been adapted to the modern media, such as Thai films, Thai television soap operas, and Thai comics.

Some of the ghosts of Thai culture are shared with neighboring cultures. Krasue, for example is part of the Cambodian, Lao, and Malay cultures as well. A few of these, including the tall Preta, are part of the mythology of Buddhism. There are, however, others, such as Phi Dip Chin, which have entered Thai ghost lore through the Chinese community residing in Thailand for the past few centuries.

== Beliefs ==
Thai spirits or ghosts are known generically as phi (ผี). A large proportion of these spirits are nocturnal. Except for the well-known Preta, most ghosts were traditionally not represented in paintings or drawings, hence they are purely based on oral tradition. The local beliefs regarding the village spirits of Thailand were studied by Phraya Anuman Rajadhon.

Ghosts are believed to frequent, among other places, certain trees, burial grounds near Buddhist temples, as well as abandoned houses.

There are different categories of ghosts. Certain ghosts dwelling in mountains and forests are generally known as Phi Khao (ผีเขา) and Phi Pa (ผีป่า). Geographic locations such as the Phi Pan Nam Range (ทิวเขาผีปันน้ำ), 'the mountain range that the spirits use to divide the waters', and Phae Mueang Phi (แพะเมืองผี) are named after ancient ghosts believed to dwell in these places. Female ghosts or fairies related to trees such as Nang Ta-khian and Nang Tani are known generically as Nang Mai (นางไม้ 'Lady of the Tree').

== List of Thai ghosts ==
Some of the most well-known Thai ghosts are the following:

=== Spirits ===
- Nang Mai (นางไม้; "Lady of the Wood"), a type of female ghosts or fairies related to trees.
- Nang Ta-khian (นางตะเคียน), a tree spirit living in Hopea odorata trees
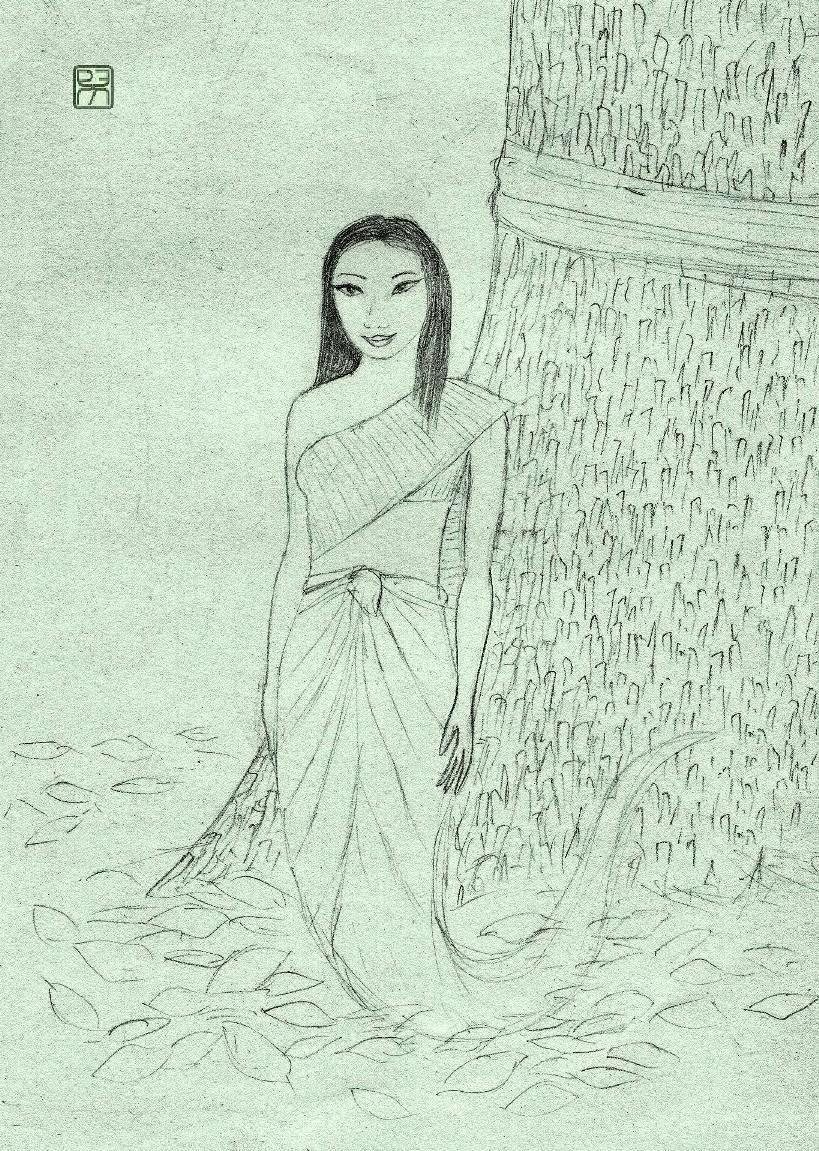
  Nang Ta-khian, the spirit haunting Hopea odorata trees in Thai folklore
- Nang Tani (นางตานี), a young woman haunting certain clumps of banana trees that appears on full moon nights
- Kuman Thong (กุมารทอง), spirits of young boys caught by voodoo masters to do his biddings, usually dressed in Thai ancient clothing with a traditional hair bun. Their name derives from the colour of their skin, which can be either gold, or pale.
- Mae sue (แม่ซื้อ), a guardian goddess or a female ghost of infants.
- Hoon payont (หุ่นพยนต์), artificial human or non-human. Owners can take advantage of the power of black magic to protect them like Khwai Thanu.
- Kwai Tanu (ควายธนู), also known as Wua Thanu (วัวธนู), a magical bull or water buffalo. Most people believe that Khwai Thanu is a black magic that is influenced by African who studied Voodoo. Khwai Thanu is popular in southern and northeastern Thailand. Shaman will use the dark magic by using Khwai Thanu to attack the enemy. You can call it a devil that destroys everything. Khwai Thanu is used to protect people from dark magic, because Khwai Thanu is a deadly weapon that destroys the enemy. It is hard to break or destroy it with general weapons. The dark magic from Khwai Thanu can be solved by using superior dark magic. Khwai Thanu has deadly magic. Shaman who wants to control it must always be tame. If shaman does not care about it, Khwai Thanu can return to hurt the owner. To make Khwai Thanu, start from the wood to the body structure. Then find the wood that the Undertaker used for the cremation. Wood from cremation must be used from the body that died on Tuesday and the bodies burned on Friday. Such timing can create the most magic of Khwai Thanu. When it comes to wood, bring it to the head, body, horn and tail. Then find a lac on the jujube that special point at the end of the branch pointed east and find the sheet of gold foil that covered the dead body over to lac another layer. Followed by use of a tiny rolled metal amulet between the chest and neck. After completing the body of Khwai Thanu, the most important step of this ritual is to cast spells to it by shaman.
- Phi Maphrao (ผีมะพร้าว), the coconut ghost.
- Phi Pluak (ผีปลวก), the ghost of the termites
- Phi Thuai Khaeo (ผีถ้วยแก้ว), the ghost that makes the upturned glass move (Thai Ouija)
- Pu Som Fao Sap (ปู่โสมเฝ้าทรัพย์), a male ghost who guards treasures, appearing like a venerable old man.
- Rak-Yom (รัก-ยม), appearing as two small boys similar to Kuman Thong.
- Mae Yanang (แม่ย่านาง)
- Phosop (แม่โพสพ)
- Cha kla (จะกละ)
- Kru Kai Kaew, a deity with half-demon figure, worshipped for good luck and fortune in work and life.

=== Ghosts ===
- Khamot (โขมด), a luminescent ghost, like a will-o'-the-wisp.
- Krahang (กระหัง), a male ghost that flies in the night. It is believed to be related with Krasue as its wife.
- Krasue (กระสือ), a woman's head with her viscera hanging down from the neck
- Chao Kam Nai Wen (เจ้ากรรมนายเวร), a ghost that maintains ill will towards a person due to the wrongful karma the latter committed to the former during the former's life.
- Mae Nak (แม่นาก), a female ghost who died at childbirth and that can extend her arms.
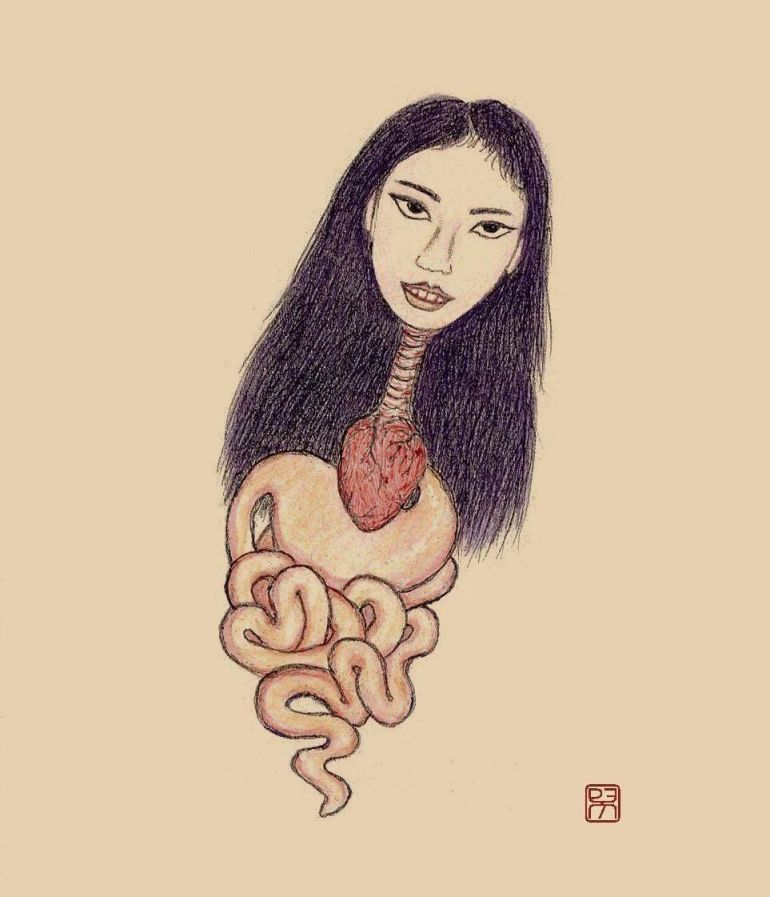
  Krasue, a nocturnal ghost of Thai folk mythology
- Phi Am (ผีอำ), a spirit that sits on a person's chest during the night. It is believed to have caused sleeping paralysis, making its name to be used as a name for the paralysis itself by both the civilians and medical officials. They mostly cause nightmares.
- Phi Hua Khat (ผีหัวขาด), a headless male ghost that carries his head.
- Phi Ka (ผีกะ), a voracious ghost
- Phi Kong Koi (ผีกองกอย), a forest vampire with one leg.
- Phi Lang Kluang (ผีหลังกลวง), a ghost from Southern Thailand with a very large wound in the back
- Phi Ma Bong (ผีม้าบ้อง), a ghost from Northern Thailand that can transform into a human and has a horse-like body, similar to a Tikbalang or Kelpie
- Phi Ngu (ผีงู), also known as Phrai Ngu (พรายงู) or Ngueak Ngu (เงือกงู), a ghost related to snakes that may appear in snake form, in human form or in a combination of both forms.
- Phi Phong (ผีโพง), a malevolent male ghost having an unpleasant smell. It lives in dark places under the vegetation.
- Phi Phrai (ผีพราย), the ghost of a woman who died together with the child in her womb or a ghost living in the water similar to an Undine.
- Phi Pop (Thai: ผีปอบ; RTGS: phi pop), a ghost which eats raw meat. Humans and animals can be possessed by Phi Pop which eat their internal organs, killing them.
- Phi Pu Thao (ผีปู่เฒ่า), a ghost appearing as a very old man.
- Phi Song Nang (ผีสองนาง), female ghost that first lures, then attacks and kills young men.
- Phi Tabo (ผีตาโบ๋), a blind ghost with hollow eyes.
- Phi Tai Ha (ผีตายห่า), ghosts of persons who died in an accident; similar to ผีตายโหง.
- Phi Tai Hong (ผีตายโหง), the ghost of a person that suffered a sudden violent or cruel death.
- Phi Thale (ผีทะเล), a spirit of the sea. It manifests itself in different ways, one of them being St. Elmo's fire, among other uncanny phenomena experienced by sailors and fishermen while on boats. Its name was also used as a slang for naughty men.
- Suea Saming (เสือสมิง), a male or female who transformed into a tiger as a result of the power of black magic similar to a Skin-walker or Werecat
- Phi Tai Thang Klom (ผีตายทั้งกลม), the vengeful ghost of pregnant women who died during childbirth.
- Mae Ya Nang (แม่ย่านาง), an elderly ghost, which was believed to possess a boat or a ship. This belief is popular among the Thai Buddhist fishermen in the southern region, as well as the Royal Thai Navy.
- Kasa (กาสา) or Kasak (กาสัก)
- Kiatimuk (เกียรติมุข)
- Jetaphut(เจตภูต)
- Jaopho Hongklong (เจ้าพ่อหอกลอง)
- Jaopa Jaokhao (เจ้าป่าเจ้าเขา) or Phra Phanasabodi (พระพนัสบดี)
- Sarokawao (ซาเราะกาเวา)
- Theparak(เทพารักษ์)
- Deva (เทวา)
- Rakka (ยักขา)
- Nok ok (นกออก)
- Aja Le Le Bird (นกอะจ๊ะเหลเหล)
- Nang Kwak(นางกวัก)
- Mae Nak Phra Kanong (นางนาค หรือ แม่นาค พระโขนง)
- Niraya Asurakaya (นิรยอสุรกาย)
- Beua (เบื้อ)
- Fire Lotus Devil (ปิศาจดอกบัวไฟ)
- Phu Jao Saming Prai (ปู่เจ้าสมิงพราย)
- Phi Ka Yak (ผีกละยักษ์)
- Phi Kon Sao Tao Fai ผีก้อนเสาเตาไฟ (ผีปู่ดำย่าดำ)
- Phi Kalom Kao ผีกะล่อมข้าว
- Phi Kai Neuoi ผีไก่หน้อย (ผีลูกไก่เรืองแสง)
- Phi Khi Lek Lai ผีขี้เหล็กไหล
- Phi Kung Keui ผีขึงขื่อ
- Phi Kun Nam ผีขุนน้ำ
- Phi Kang Pon ผีค้างพอน
- Phi Kruea ผีเครือ
- Phi Jom Pruak ผีจอมปลวก
- Phi Chaka ผีจะกละ(ผีแมว)
- Phi Chao Nai ผีเจ้านาย (พวกผีร่างทรง)
- Phi Chao Ta ผีเจ้าท่า
- Phi Chamop (ผีฉมบ)
- Phi Cha Krae ผีชะแคร่
- Phi Sin ผีชิน
- Phi Nang Dong ผีด้งหรือผีนางด้ง
- Phi Dip ผีดิบ
- Phi Ton Po ผีต้นโพธิ์
- Phi Ta Langผีตะแหลง (ผีแปลงร่าง)
- Phi Ta Kon ผีตาโขน
- Phi Da Da ผีดาดา
- Phi Ta Bo ผีตาโบ๋
- Phi Tai Pai ผีตายพราย
- Phi Ta Moi] ผีต๋ามอย
- Phi Ta Mong ผีตาโม่ง (ผีลูกไฟ)
- Phi To Kreng ผีโต๊ะเคร็ง
- Phi Toui Kaew ผีถ้วยแก้ว
- Phi Tan] ผีแถน (ผีด้ำใหญ่)
- Phi Ta Le ผีทะเล
- Phi Na] ผีนา (ผีตาแฮก)
- Phi Nang Noi] ผีนางน้อย
- Phi Nang Ram ผีนางรำ
- Phi Nang O Kra Chang ผีนางโอกระแชง (ผีแชง)
- Phi Bang Bod ผีบังบด
- Phi Ban Phi Rouen ผีบ้านผีเรือน
- Phi Pakam (ผีปะกำ)
- Preta ผีเปรตยักษ์
- Phi Pa ผีป่า
- Phi Puang ผีป่วง
- Phi Pu Ya ผีปู่ย่า
- Phi Pao ผีเป้า
- Phi Pok Ka Long ผีโป๊กกะโหล้ง
- Phi Pong ผีโป่งดิน (ผีค่างดิน)
- Phi Pong ผีโป่งน้ำ (ผีค่างน้ำ)
- Phi Pu Sae Ya Sae ผีปู่แสะย่าแสะ
- Phi Pad Tao ผีแปดเต้า
- Phi Pong ผีโผงดง
- Phi Panan ผีพนัน (ทวาบร)
- Phi Phrai (ผีพราย)
- Phi Pia ผีเพลีย
- Phi Phrai (ผีไพร)
- Phi Pongผีโพง
- Comet ผีพุ่งไต้ (ผีปุ้งส้าว)
- Phi Fong Fai ผีฟองฝ้าย
- Phi Fa ผีฟ้า นางเทียม
- Phi Mod Phi Meng ผีมดผีเม็ง
- Phi Ma Bong ผีม้าบ้อง (ปอบม้า)
- Phi Mae Bandai ผีแม่บันได
- Phi Mae Mai ผีแม่มาย
- Phi Mae Mai ผีแม่หม้าย
- Phi Mai Nam Lu Nam Rai ผีไม้น้ำหลุน้ำไหล
- Phi Yai Sombat ผีย้ายสมบัติ
- Phi Ya Moh Nueng ผีย่าหม้อหนึ้ง
- Phi Lan Noud Kao ผีลานนวดข้าว
- Phi Song Sao ผีสองสาว
- Phi Mahesak ผีมเหสักข์ มเหสักข์
- Phi Lang Kruang ผีหลังกลวง
- Phi Hing Phi Rong ผีหิ้งผีโรง
- Phi Hua Kad ผีหัวขาด
- Phi Hua Luang ผีหัวหลวง
- Phi I Koi ผีอี่ค้อย
- Phi I Nguak ผีอี่เงือก
- Phi I Hung ผีอี่ฮุง (ผีสายรุ้ง)
- Pra Kwan พระขวัญ
- Prai Ngu พรายงู
- Pho Kae Leu Si Phi Krue พ่อแก่ฤๅษีผีครู (ตฺริกาลชฺญ)
- Po Pu Kiao พ่อปู่เขียว ผีหม้อยาย ผียายตะกร้า ผียายชาม ผียายกระบอก
- Kala (Thai: พระกาล; RGTS: Phra Kan)
- Bhummaso (Thai: พระภูมิเจ้าที่; RGTS: Phra Phumijaothi)
- Bhamasura (ภัสมาสูร)
- Manomai (มโนมัย)
- Masasin (มัสสีล)
- Ma Thewakanthat (ม้าเทวกันทัด)
- Ma Asunkanthaka (ม้าอสูรกัณฐกะ)
- Maeng Sihuhata (แมงสี่หูห้าตา)
- Mae Thorani Pratu (แม่ธรณีประตู)
- Maeng Mani Phibok (แมงหมานีผีบอก)
- Mae Phi Lakson (ไม้ผีลักซ้อน)
- Yai Kalatakali(ยายกะลาตากะลี) or Nang Picha (นายป่าช้า)
- Rakshasa (รากษส)
- Pusom Faosap (ปู่โสมเฝ้าทรัพย์)
- Waruekhaka (วฤคกะ)
- Sipchuan (ศิพชวน)
- Saming(สมิง)
- Hoon payont (หุ่นพยนต์)
- Non Narok Paklek(หนอนนรกปากเหล็ก)
- Hong Phrai (โหงพราย)
- Ika Paklek (อีกาปากเหล็ก)
- Ilawala (อิลวละ)
- Watapi (วาตาปิ)

== From other cultures ==
- Phi Dip Chin (ผีดิบจีน), a jumping ghost from the Chinese lore dressed in an ancient costume and having a written Chinese rune in front of its face. It became popular in Thailand through the Thai Chinese community.
- Pret (เปรต), an extremely tall hungry ghost part of the Buddhist lore; they are two stories tall, very skinny and have needle hole for mouths.
- Chitragupta (Thai: เจ้าเจตคุปต์; RGTS: Jao Jetakhup)
- Kubera (Thai: ท้าวกุเวร; RGTS: Thao Kuwen)
- Dhrtarastra (Thai: ท้าวธตรฐ; RGTS: Thao Thatarot)
- Virudhaka (Thai: ท้าววิรุฬหก; RGTS: Thao Wirunhok)
- Virupaksa (Thai: ท้าววิรูปักษ์; RGTS: Thao Wirupak)

== Interaction with ghosts ==
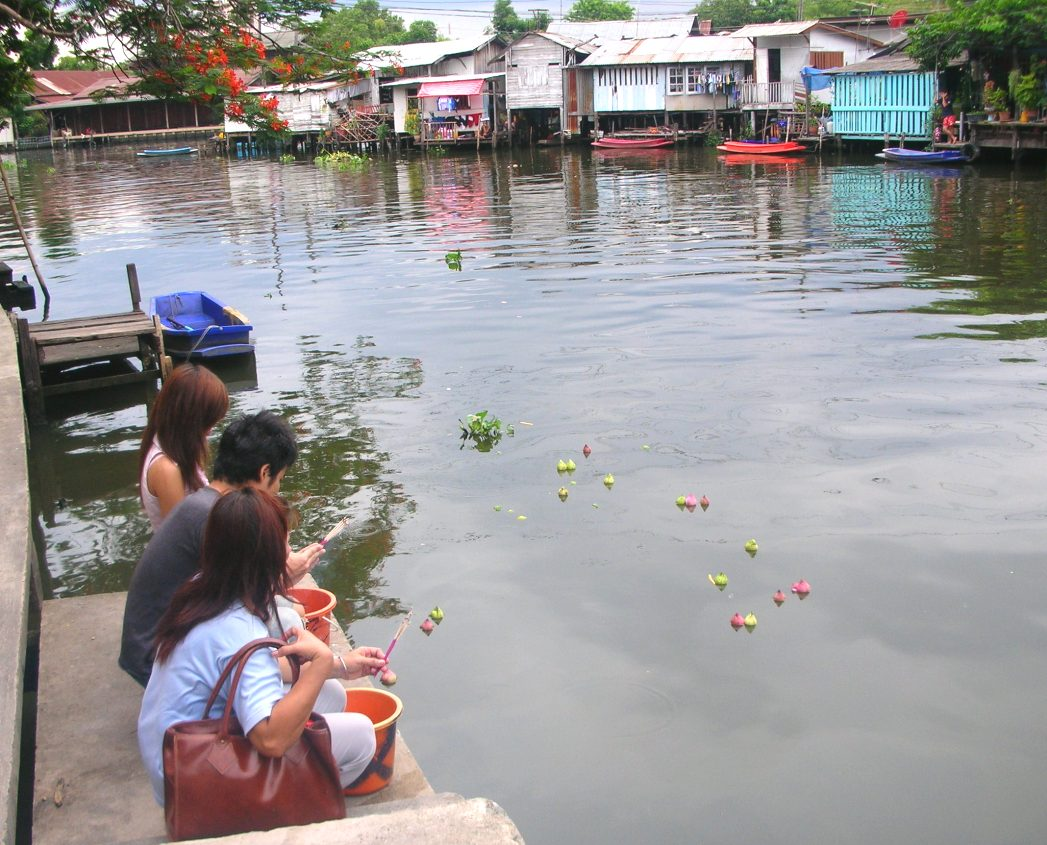
Mae Nak shrine, Bangkok. Offerings of lotus buds and the release of live fish, Phra Khanong Canal

Ghosts in Thai culture may be benevolent. Certain ghosts have their own shrines and among these there are some, such as the Mae Nak Phra Khanong shrine in Bangkok, that are quite important. Usually though, humbler tutelary spirits live in little dwellings known as san phra phum (Thai: ศาลพระภูมิ), small ghost shrines that provide a home for these household or tree spirits. These shrines are common near trees and groves and in urban areas, close to buildings. It is considered a bad omen to neglect these spots and offerings are regularly made by people living nearby. Usually offerings to tree spirits are small things such as small food items, drinks, incense sticks or fruits, but when important favors are requested it is common to offer the head of a pig. After the ceremony is over the pig head is brought home and eaten.

The mo phi (Thai: หมอผี; RTGS: mo phi) or 'witch doctor' may invoke spirits of the dead. In this ritual, four sticks are usually planted at equal distance from each other on the ground near the burial or cremation place. A thread is tied around the sticks forming a protective square and a mat is spread in the middle. The mo phi sits down within this enclosure, often along with other people present at the ritual. In front of him, outside of the square there is a mo khao terracotta jar containing ashes or bones of the dead person with a yantra painted on the outside. Beside the jar there is also a plate of rice as offering and a stick or switch to keep the spirits at bay.

On the other hand, there are spirits that are considered dangerous and need to be disposed of. In these cases the mo phi may conduct a ritual in order to confine the dangerous ghost to an earthen jar, which may be sealed and thrown into a deep canal, river or lake.

The persistence of folk belief in malevolent spirits was demonstrated in a 2017 case occurring at Ban Na Bong, Nong Kung Si District, Kalasin Province. There, the mysterious deaths of two men and several animals prompted villagers to ascribe their deaths to malicious phi pop. Seeking help, villagers from 370 households paid 124 Thai baht per house to hire an exorcist from Chiang Yuen District in Maha Sarakham Province and a well-known monk from Wat Chaiwan to eliminate the malevolent spirits. The people of Ban Na Bong turned up en masse at the village hall for a ghost busting ceremony on 29 October. The rite took more than two hours. The exorcist and the monk, aided by 20 assistants, caught at least 30 phi pop, forcing them into bamboo tubes which were then incinerated. Police and district officials ensured the event went smoothly. Preventive medical specialists from the Kalasin Provincial Public Health Office later identified the cause of death in Ban Na Bong as leptospirosis (Thai: โรคฉี่หนู; RTGS: rok chi nu) and high blood pressure.

Phi Ta Khon, sometimes known as Ghost Festival, is a three-day festival held in Loei Province.

== Mae Nak Phra Khanong ==
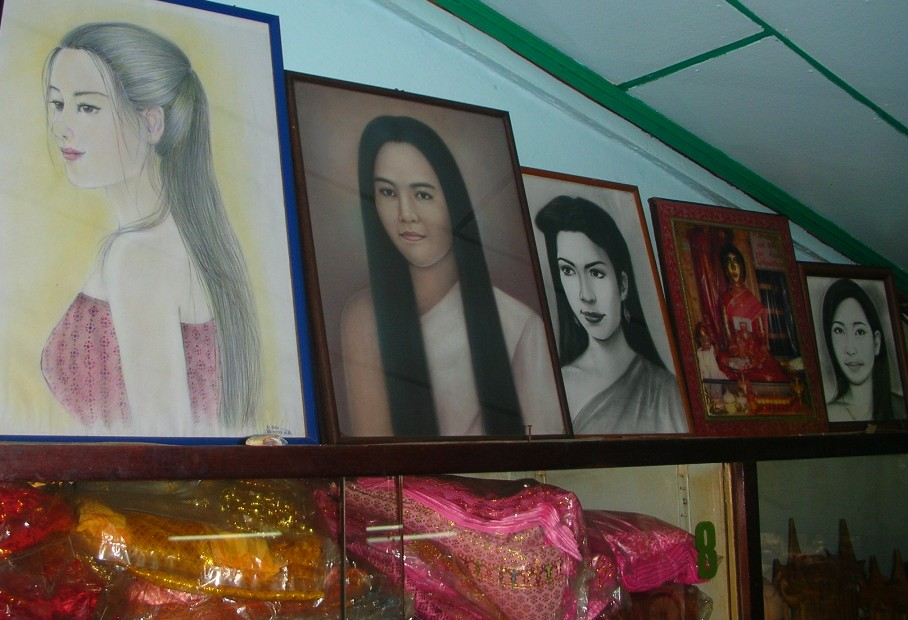
A Mae Nak Phra Khanong shrine with portraits of the ghost and dresses

The most famous ghost story in Thailand is the Mae Nak Phra Khanong. The story is associated with events that allegedly took place in the early-1800s, during the reign of King Rama IV of Thailand. In 1959 the story was first developed into a movie, with many later cinematic versions to follow. The latest cinematic version of the Mae Nak story is Pee Mak, a 2013 comedy-horror film by GMM Tai Hub. The movie debuted on 26 March 2013, making 500 million baht, and went on to become the top Thai movie in the box office for 2013. Over time, the Mae Nak spirit has evolved into a sacred figure/deity within Thai culture, with a large shrine to the spirit being built in Mae Nak's hometown, and with many Mae Nak followers throughout Thailand.

== Modern media ==
Thai cinema began popularizing the ghosts and legends of the folklore of Thailand in the 20th century. Ghosts of the local tradition appeared in horror movies, as well as in side-roles in mainstream movies. Phraya Anuman Rajadhon established that most of the contemporary iconography of Thai folk ghosts has its origins in Thai films that have now become classics.

Thai television soap operas have contributed to popularize the ghost theme. Some soap operas, such as Raeng Ngao, include the folk ghosts of Thai culture interacting with the living. The Raeng Ngao story proved so popular that five remakes have been made after it was first aired in 1986.

Thai ghosts are frequently depicted in comic books and children's films, including animated works such as Nak,

== See also ==
- Thai folklore
- Thai horror
