= Khamot =

Khanot โขมด
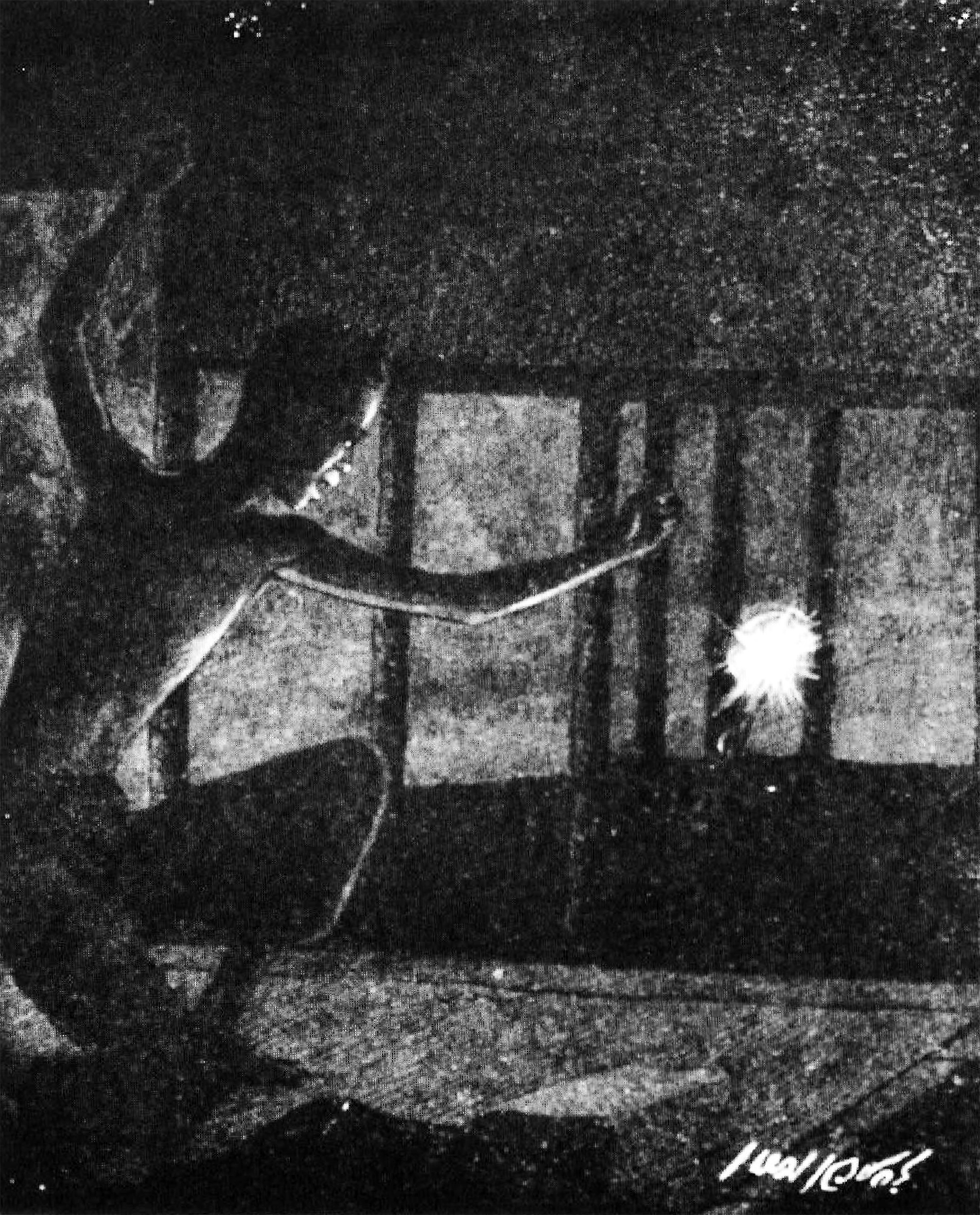
- An illustration of a Krasue from the book Phut Phi Pisat Thai ("Thai Ghosts and Spirits") by Hem Vejakorn, depicting features similar to a Khomot.

Creature information
- Other name: Phi Khamot (ผีโขมด)
- Grouping: Atmospheric ghost lights
- Sub grouping: Nocturnal, undead
- Similar entities: Krasue; Phong; Onibi; Will-o'-the-wisp
- Folklore: Thai folk mythology & Khmer folk mythology

Origin
- Country: Thailand; Cambodia
- Region: Southeast Asia
- Habitat: Rural areas

Khamot (Thai: โขมด, pronounced [kʰà.mòːt]) is a type of ghost in Thai folklore. The term is borrowed from the Khmer word khmaoch (ខ្មោច, pronounced [khmōch], lit. 'ghost in general'). It is considered a spirit related to Krasue and Phong ghosts.

== Forms ==
It has no definite form. In some accounts, it appears as a floating ball of light, a large flickering glow seen at night, especially in damp or marshy areas. It is said to lure travelers in the forest into losing their way, making them believe that someone ahead is carrying a torch or that there is a fire. When they approach, the light suddenly disappears, only to reappear surrounding them from all directions.

According to the Royal Institute Dictionary, "a Khamot is defined as a type of ghost in the same group as Krasue or Phong ghosts, appearing as a glowing light at night that misleads people into thinking there is a fire or someone holding a torch ahead. When approached, it disappears. Scientifically, this phenomenon is explained as methane gas produced by the decomposition of organic matter, which can ignite in the air and appear as flickering lights in the dark."

== Regional variations ==
In some regions, it is described as a type of forest spirit that manifests as a floating light at night. In others, it is considered a malevolent ghost that deceives and haunts travelers by shapeshifting into various forms.

In Lamphun province, northern Thailand, there is a local tradition called Loy Khamot (ลอยโขมด), held during the full moon of the twelfth lunar month, which coincides with the Loy Krathong festival, at the pier of Wat Romaniyaram temple. The floating lanterns used in this festival sparkle with lights resembling the glowing orbs of the Khomot ghost.

== See also ==
- Atmospheric ghost lights
- Krasue
- Will-o'-the-wisp
- Onibi
