= Kong koi =

Thai ghost

Kong Koi
Creature information
- Other name: Phi Kong Koi
- Grouping: Legendary creature
- Sub grouping: Vampire
- Similar entities: Jiangshi; Patasola; Shanxiao; Gollum
- Folklore: Thai folk mythology & Lao folk mythology

Origin
- Country: Thailand, Laos
- Region: Southeast Asia
- Habitat: Deep jungle in northeast of Thailand & west of Laos

Kong koi or Phi Kong Koi (Thai: ผีกองกอย, pronounced [pʰiː kɔ̂ːŋ kɔːj]) is a Lao and Thai jungle ghost. Their appearance is not easily characterized, but often described as a phantom with one leg. They move by hopping with one leg and shout, "Koi, koi, koi". Some people believe it has a fly-like tube mouth. Others describe it as looking like monkey or langur. Most agree this ghost is ugly and cannot climb trees, which is unusual in nature. It is believed that the Phi Kong Koi will suck blood from the toes of the sleeping traveler in the jungle; Travelers should keep the feet together or cross their feet when sleeping to protect themselves.

== Anthropologically ==
The name Phi Kong Koi has several sources. Phi means ghost in the Thai language; some people use the term Phi Pong (ผีโป่ง) or Phi Pong Kang (ผีโป่งค่าง; 'mineral lick ghost') (Note: There is an additional explanation: Phi Pong refers to a spirit associated with natural salt licks (din pong), areas where wild animals such as deer, gaur, and elephants gather to obtain essential minerals from the soil. The spirit is thought to guard and oversee these sites, which are vital to the survival of wildlife. A related belief concerns Phi Pong Kang, in which the spirit of a deceased langur is said to inhabit the body of a living one. This transformation turns the animal into a fearsome, blood-sucking being.) and Phi Teen Diao (ผีตีนเดียว; 'one-footed ghost'). The word koi or koy (กอย), as defined by the Royal Institute Dictionary means, "An ethnic group having black skin, curly hair in the Malay Peninsula, also known as Sakai." Sakai, here, most likely refers to, either, the more generally used (at least in Malaysia) Orang Asli, or the Semang. (Note: Sakai, in this case, likely a use of the former sense of the term, meaning any of the heterogenous aboriginal peoples of Malaysia. Alternatively, it may be the ethnic-minority group, the Semang (formerly also conflated under the Sakai term in Malaysia), some of whom live in areas of Yala Province in southern Thailand, while the majority live in Malaysia. Sakai are a Malay people, but a separate group, quite distinct from earlier uses of the term.)

== Reported sightings ==
Luang Pu Waen Suciṇṇo (former abbot of Wat Doi Mae Pang, Chiang Mai province) said that when he traveled in the jungle in Khammouane, Laos, with Luang Pu Tue Ajala Thamฺmo, they fought with many Phi Kong Koi at night. He described the Phi Kong Koi as being shaped like children of about 13–14 years old. They were thin with a bulging belly, dark brown skin, dark hair, and a chubby nose. They were armed with small crossbows or arrows and shouted "Koi". Luang Pu Waen and fellow travelers were meditating, which protected them from the Phi Kong Koi. At dawn, the Phi Kong Koi surrendered and invited both of them to their home.

Some have suggested, based on this story, that the Phi Kong Koi are really the Kha Ra Dae (ข่าระแด) an ethnic group. This indicates that in the above story, they were hunting and possibly killing intruding humans and taking the meat to eat.

In the faith of Tai Dam in Nong Sung district, Mukdahan province, they believe that Phi Kong Koi is a long-haired, very small (childlike) woman with backwards feet. They speak the opposite of reality. It is also believed that fish or valuables found along forest paths should not be taken, as they belong to Phi Kong Koi, who will come to reclaim them.

A forest ranger from Khao Yai National Park recounted that, once while he was patrolling the forest and lying down around midnight, he felt as if something resembling a monkey was rapidly descending from a tree. He tried chanting several prayers, but it did not stop. It came to rest at the tip of his leg. He then thought of a revered monk he respected and struck at it with a cloth. Remarkably, it bounced back. According to the monk's description, the entity was identified as a Phi Kong Koi.

The Karen have a different belief: the Phi Kong Koi is seen as a small, extremely agile, shrew-like creature with small, sharp teeth and fangs used to suck the blood of its prey for nourishment. Bulan Rantee, a well-known Thai adventure writer and nature enthusiast, has claimed that he once encountered what he believes was the Phi Kong Koi, The incident reportedly took place during a camping trip in the forested area of Bang Saphan Noi district, Prachuap Khiri Khan province. He had set up his tent near a creek, separated from the rest of his group. Late at night, he heard a repeated splashing sound, similar to someone or something walking in water, "splash... splash... splash...". Whenever he stepped out to investigate, the noise stopped. The same pattern occurred multiple times throughout the night, and at one point the sound resembled someone running through the water. He said he got up to investigate four times that night. He called out to his companions, but none of them woke up. On the final attempt, he used a flashlight to scan the area where the sound had come from, but saw nothing unusual, not even the slightest rustle of leaves, and no sign of glowing eyes from any animal. The next morning, when he told a local guide about what had happened, the guide simply said, "Looks like something found you," and let out a cunning laugh. He refused to give further details.

In September 2016, strange footprint were found at a cave in the forest in Loei province. Believed to be the footprints of Phi Kong Koi, the director of a local cultural agency said Phi Kong Koi are real and that they are ethnic group whose has not been seen for a long time.

In 2018, a video clip was circulated online showing roadside grass at night in an unidentified location. The headlights of a pickup truck appeared to reveal a small figure that quickly jumped away from the light. The footage was initially claimed to show Phi Kong Koi. However, the clip attracted skepticism, with most observers dismissing it as staged content, suggesting the figure was nothing more than a puppet.

Around mid-August 2024, reports surfaced that an internet celebrity claimed his home in Surin province had been invaded by the Phi Kong Koi. He recounted that he and his wife had only been living in the house for about three months when, almost every night, they began to hear strange tapping or knocking sounds on the outer wall of their second-floor bedroom. Each time he went to check, he found nothing. Eventually, he installed surveillance cameras, but again, nothing unusual was caught on video. To further investigate, he sprinkled powder on the balcony and on the stairs leading up to the rooftop. The next morning, he discovered what appeared to be a large, human-like footprint, but only the right foot, and it had six toes, with a long, pointed big toe. He was convinced it was the footprint of the Phi Kong Koi. He insisted the event was real and not part of a content stunt. In addition, the local residents also believe that the Phi Kong Koi really exists. One person recounted having encountered it in the past: deep in the forest at night, he saw what appeared to be the shadows of three to four boys and heard the sound of giggling coming from within. But when he approached, there was nothing there.

About this matter, Dr. Weerachai Phutdhawong from the Faculty of Science, Kasetsart University offered a more skeptical explanation. He suggested that the footprint was likely human, and that when someone steps on ashes or salt, the evaporation of moisture can cause the print to expand and appear larger than normal.

== In media ==
The Kong koi has appeared in popular culture:

- Yong Tod the character in Phra Aphai Mani, an early Rattanakosin-era epic poem by Sunthorn Phu. In the story, Yong Tod is depicted as an undead being living in the forest, possessing immortality and magical abilities.
- It is also referenced in the 2025 supernatural horror adventure film Death Whisperer III. Kong koi, also known as Phi Pong Kang, is a relatively obscure spirit said to have a small, monkey-like appearance and to live in groups. It moves rapidly through trees and has wing-like, membranous structures on its back. According to folklore, it feeds on the blood of people traveling through forests and is vulnerable to fire.
- The 2026 Thai–Lao horror film Wrecked also draws inspiration from the legend of the Kong Koi.

== Similar creatures ==
- Jiangshi: Chinese hopping vampire
- Madam Koi Koi: African demon walking with hopping with one heel
- Patasola: one-legged female vampire in jungle of South America
- Shanxiao: Chinese mountain one-legged hairy creature
- Sansei: A kind of Japanese supernatural being or Yōkai, it has one leg and backward foot live on the mountain. Its name directly translates to "mountain spirit"
- Kalanoro: A powerful and ferocious creature from the island of Madagascar, with sharp claws, backward-facing feet, thick fur, and an appearance resembling a monkey or lemur
- Nasnas: In Arabian folklore it is a one-legged type of Jinn, said to be the offsprings of Shiqq and Humans
