= Fachan =

Creature from Scottish folklore

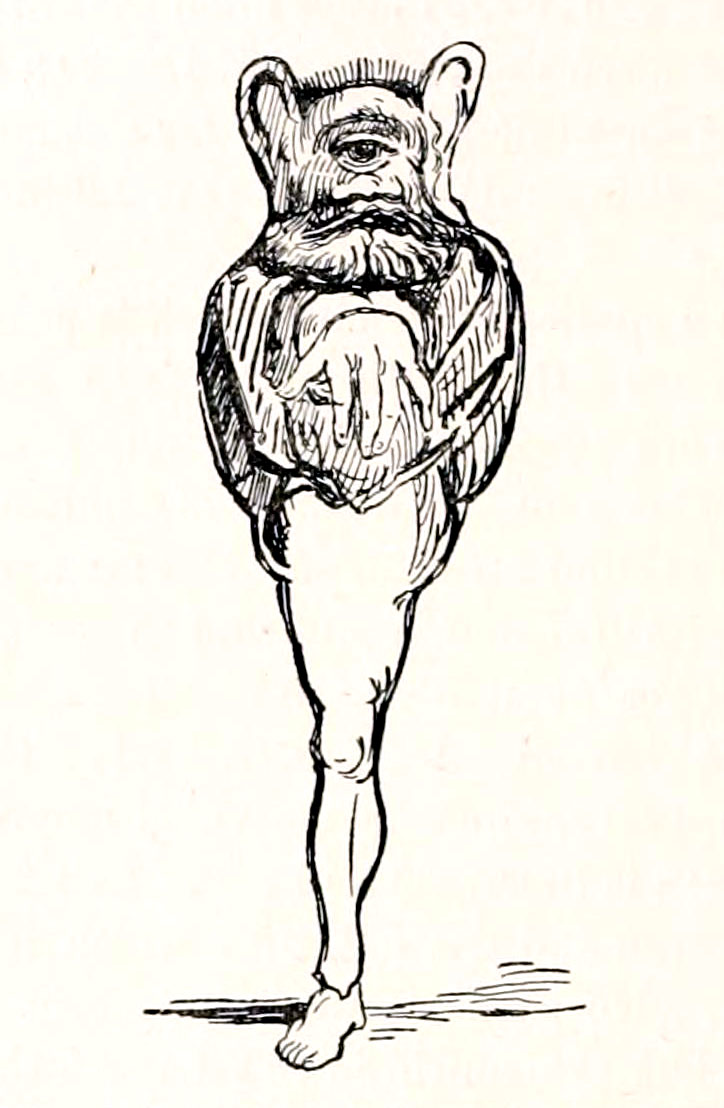
"Direach Ghlinn Eiti, or Fachan" as illustrated by J. F. Campbell

In Scottish folklore, the fachan (or fachin, fachen, Direach Ghlinn Eitidh or Dithreach (dwarf of Glen Etive)) is a monster or giant described by John Francis Campbell in Popular Tales of the West Highlands as having a single eye in the middle of its face, a single hand protruding from its chest instead of arms, and a single leg emerging from its central axis. It has a single tuft of hair on the top of its head, regarding which Campbell says "it were easier to take a mountain from the root than to bend that tuft." Campbell draws attention to the possible influence of creatures from Arabic tradition such as the nasnas or shiqq, described as "half of a human being" and hopping about on one leg with great agility.

Douglas Hyde quotes Campbell's description in his collection of Irish folklore Beside the Fire and refers to an Irish manuscript in which a similar monster is described:

He held a very thick iron flail-club in his skinny hand, and twenty chains out of it, and fifty apples on each chain of them, and a venomous spell on each great apple of them, and a girdle of the skins of deer and roebuck around the thing that was his body, and one eye in the forehead of his black-faced countenance, and one bare, hard, very hairy hand coming out of his chest, and one veiny, thick-soled leg supporting him and a close, firm, dark blue mantle of twisted hard-thick feathers, protecting his body, and surely he was more like unto devil than to man.

Hyde suggests that both descriptions represent branches of a common Gaelic tradition, and that the word fachan may be a diminutive of the Irish fathach (giant) and related to the Scottish famhair (giant).

== See also ==
- List of one-eyed creatures in mythology and fiction
- Monopod (creature)
- Fomorians
