= Phi Tai Hong =

Ghost of Thai folklore

Creature information
- Grouping: Ghosts
- Sub grouping: Vengeful ghost, undead
- Similar entities: Tai Thang Klom, Tai Thong Klom
- Folklore: Thai folk mythology

Origin
- Country: Thailand
- Region: Southeast Asia
- Habitat: Haunted houses, area where death took place

Phi Tai Hong (Thai: ผีตายโหง) is a ghost of Thai folklore. It is the vengeful and restless spirit of a person who suddenly suffered a violent or cruel death.

== Origins ==
Phi Tai Hong usually has its origin in a man or a woman who died suddenly, often without the observance of proper funerary rituals. According to the Royal Institute Dictionary 1999, the official dictionary of Thai words, tai hong means "to die an unnatural and violent death, such as being murdered or drowning" and Phi Tai Hong means the ghost of a person who died in such manner. The word hong (โหง) has two components: "great suffering" and "suddenness or unexpectedness", with the latter component being more prominent because people who become Phi Tai Hong are not able to prepare themselves for death. These types of ghosts symbolize how life can end unpredictably and anyone can become victims of death. Thus there is a distinction between them and for example, cancer patients, who do suffer greatly but are aware of their condition and potential death. Suicide victims or prisoners who were executed also do not fall under the category of Phi Tai Hong because their death was anticipated.

According to Thai oral tradition Phi Tai Hong are especially dangerous and aggressive because, due to their sudden death, they were unable to fulfill their dreams and desires while alive. As such, their anger and sorrow are manifested into the form of a vengeful ghost. It is believed that the first seven days of a person's death is when their spirit is most actively seeking revenge and the living are advised to avoid the area where they had died. Phi Tai Hong will often try to kill other living people in the same manner of which they had died themselves, and as a consequence they are among the most feared ghosts in Thai culture.

Thai culture blames these types of vengeful spirits as one of the most difficult to exorcise. This is due to their particularly violent nature and because they actively haunt areas where their death took place, including houses. Exorcisms can be very complicated, involving arcane ceremonies. Stories about this kind of spirit and the exorcism ceremonies that are needed to be free from them are popular in Thai publications.

There is another distinct form of Phi Tai Hong known as Tai Thang Klom (ตายทั้งกลม) or Tai Thong Klom (ตายท้องกลม), which is the ghost of a woman who died together with her child in her womb.

== Tai Thang Klom and Tai Thong Klom ==
The most violent and vengeful manifestation of Phi Tai Hong comes in the form of ghosts called Tai Thang Klom (ตายทั้งกลม) or Tai Thong Klom (ตายท้องกลม). They are ghosts of pregnant women who died along with an unborn child, typically due to childbirth complications. These ghosts are even more malevolent because two lives were lost, not just one, resulting in the power of two spirits.

Written records going far back as to the Ayutthaya period detail the power and fear associated with this particular type of spirit. According to the writings of Jeremias van Vliet, a director of the Dutch East India Company in Ayutthaya during the 17th century, sacrificing pregnant women by burying them alive under city fortifications and buildings turned them into protective spirits rather than destructive Tai Thang Klom or Tai Thong Klom.

== Modern adaptations ==
Phi Tai Hong is a ghost that has been featured in many movies of different types, such as 2003 Thai comedy-horror film Buppah Rahtree and the 2010 film Tai Hong. It also appears in many other movies, but in a role less central to the theme. In its Tai Thang Klom variant this ghost is featured in the 2010 film Tai Thang Klom ("The Snow White").

Phi Tai Hong is also a recurring theme in Thai television soap operas (lakhon) such as The Sixth Sense (สื่อรักสัมผัสหัวใจ), the highly successful Raeng Ngao (แรงเงา), and in Fai Huan (ไฟหวน), as well as in the more recent Nang Chada (นางชฎา) with Davika Hoorne as the vengeful ghost and Waen Sawat (แหวนสวาท) starring 'Pancake' Khemanit Jamikorn in a dual role.

The Phi Tai Hong legend often provides a plot to erotic films, such as Phi Sao Tai Hong and Khon Hen Phi, in which the hero spends a night of pleasure with a woman, but then finds out later she was an apparition.

== See also ==
- Onryō
- Hun and po
- Mae Nak
- Phraya Anuman Rajadhon
- Vengeful ghost
