= Monopod (creature) =

Mythological humanoids with a single leg

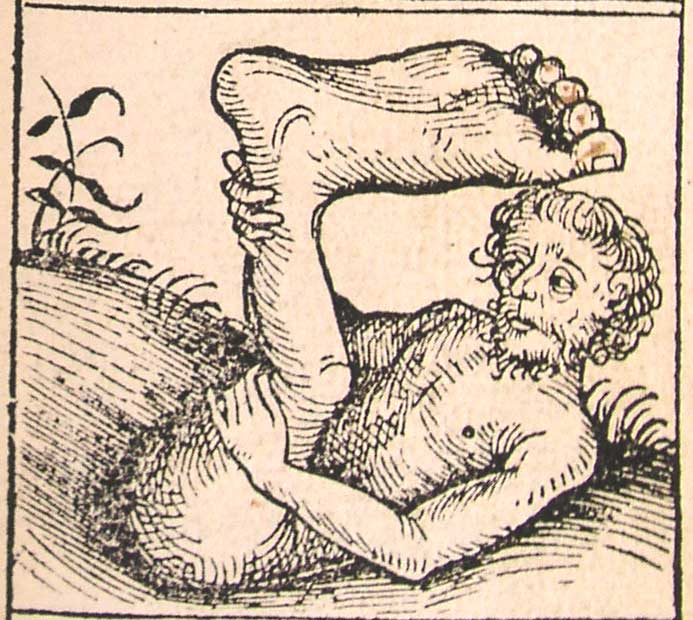
Illustration from the Nuremberg Chronicle, 1493

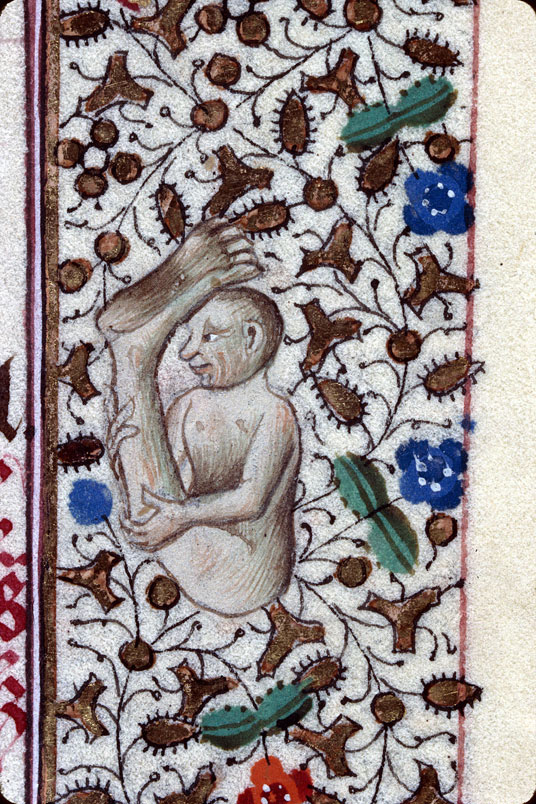
Sciapod protecting himself from the sun by the shade of his foot. In margin of "Heures à l'usage des Antonins", 15th century. Attributed to the "Maître du Prince de Piémont".

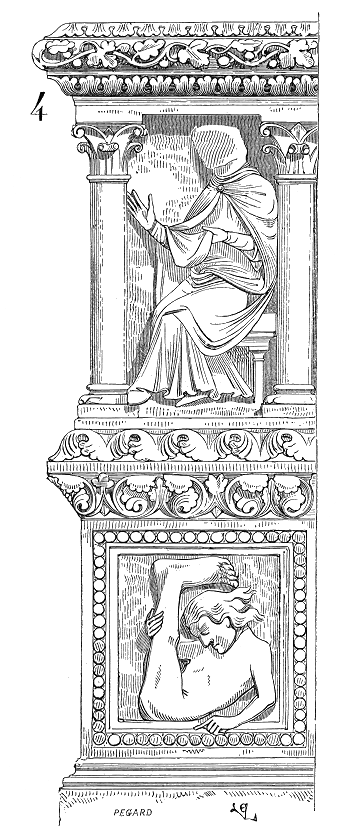
A stone image of a monopod (bottom), from the Cathédrale Saint-Étienne de Sens

Monopods (also called sciapods, skiapods, skiapodes) were mythological dwarf-like creatures with a single, large foot extending from a leg centred in the middle of their bodies. The names monopod and skiapod (σκιάποδες) are both Greek, respectively meaning "one-foot" and "shadow-foot".

== Ancient Greek and Roman literature ==
Monopods appear in Aristophanes' play The Birds, first performed in 414 BC. They are described by Pliny the Elder in his Natural History, where he reports travelers' stories from encounters or sightings of Monopods in India. Pliny remarks that they are first mentioned by Ctesias in his book Indika (India), a record of the view of Persians of India which only remains in fragments. Pliny describes Monopods like this:

He [Ctesias] speaks also of another race of men, who are known as Monocoli, who have only one leg, but are able to leap with surprising agility. The same people are also called Sciapodae, because they are in the habit of lying on their backs, during the time of the extreme heat, and protect themselves from the sun by the shade of their feet.

Philostratus mentions Skiapodes in his Life of Apollonius of Tyana, which was cited by Eusebius in his Treatise Against Hierocles. Apollonius of Tyana believes the Skiapodes live in India and Ethiopia, and asks the Indian sage Iarkhas about their existence.

St. Augustine (354–430) mentions the "Skiopodes" in The City of God, Book 16, Chapter 8 entitled "Whether Certain Monstrous Races of Men Are Derived From the Stock of Adam or Noah's Sons", and mentions that it is uncertain whether such creatures exist.

== Ancient Chinese literature ==
The monopod (kuí 夔) is referred to in the Zhuangzi:

The monopod envies the millipede; the millipede envies the snake; the snake envies the wind. […] The monopod said to the millipede, “I just go hippety-flopping on one foot, and am inferior to everyone. How do you manage those ten thousand feet of yours?” The millipede said, “It’s not like that. Haven’t you seen a man spit? He just hawks and—drops big as pearls! fine as mist! Mixing and falling! You can’t count them all! I just put my heavenly mechanism into motion. I don’t know how it works!”

== Medieval literature ==
Reference to the legend continued into the Middle Ages, for example with Isidore of Seville in his Etymologiae, where he writes:

The race of Sciopodes are said to live in Ethiopia; they have only one leg, and are wonderfully speedy. The Greeks call them σκιαπόδες ("shade-footed ones") because when it is hot they lie on their backs on the ground and are shaded by the great size of their foot.

The Hereford Mappa Mundi, drawn c. 1300, shows a sciapod on one side of the world, as does a world map drawn by Beatus of Liébana (c. 730 – c. 800).

=== Einfœtingr of Canada ===
A race of the "One-Legged", or the "Uniped" (Old Norse: einfœtingr) was allegedly encountered by Thorfinn Karlsefni and his group of Icelandic settlers in North America in the early 11th century, according to Eiríks saga rauða (Saga of Erik the Red). (Note: It was also noted by C. C. Rafn that Rímbegla (end of 12th century, published 1780) mentions a population of Unipeds (einfœtingjar) dwelling in Bláland in Aethiopia.) The presence of "unipedes maritimi" in Greenland was marked on Claudius Clavus's map dated 1427.

According to the saga, Karlsefni Thorvald Eiriksson and others assembled a search party for Thorhall, and sailed around Kjalarnes and then south. After sailing for a long time, while moored on the south side of a west-flowing river, they were shot at by a one-footed man (einfœtingr), and Thorvald died from an arrow wound.

The saga goes on to relate that the party went northward and approached what they guessed to be Einfœtingaland ("Land of the One-Legged" or "Country of the Unipeds").

== Origin ==
According to Carl A. P. Ruck, the Monopods' cited existence in India refers to the Vedic Aja Ekapad ("Not-born Single-foot"), an epithet for Soma. Since Soma is a botanical deity the single foot would represent the stem of an entheogenic plant or fungus.

John of Marignolli (1338–1353) provides another explanation of these creatures. Quote from his travels from India:

The truth is that no such people do exist as nations, though there may be an individual monster here and there. Nor is there any people at all such as has been invented, who have but one foot which they use to shade themselves withal. But as all the Indians commonly go naked, they are in the habit of carrying a thing like a little tent-roof on a cane handle, which they open out at will as a protection against sun or rain. This they call a chatyr; I brought one to Florence with me. And this it is which the poets have converted into a foot.

— Giovanni de' Marignolli

In a 2025 article, Karl Brandt proposed that the legend of the Monopod may have been inspired by the remains of thresher sharks with the elongated caudal fin resembling a single giant foot. The long-held belief, dating at least as far back as Pliny the Elder's Natural History, that every land animal had a counterpart in the sea, and vice versa, may have contributed to the legend.

== Fiction ==
=== Chronicles of Narnia ===
C. S. Lewis features monopods in the book The Voyage of the Dawn Treader, a part of his children's series The Chronicles of Narnia.

In the story, a tribe of foolish dwarves known as Duffers inhabit a small island near the edge of the Narnian world along with a magician named Coriakin, who has transformed them into monopods as a punishment. They have become so unhappy with their appearance that they have made themselves invisible. They are (re)discovered by explorers from the Narnian ship, the Dawn Treader, which has landed on the island to rest and resupply, and at their request Lucy Pevensie makes them visible again. Through confusion between their old name, "Duffers", and their new name of "Monopods", they become known as the "Dufflepuds".

According to Brian Sibley's book The Land of Narnia, Lewis may have based their appearance on drawings from the Hereford Mappa Mundi.

=== Baudolino ===
Umberto Eco in his novel Baudolino describes a sciapod named Gavagai. The name of the creature "Gavagai" is a reference to Quine's example of indeterminacy of translation.

=== The Name of the Rose ===
In Umberto Eco's novel The Name of the Rose, the abbey's chapter house is decorated with carvings of "the inhabitants of unknown worlds," including "sciopods, who run swiftly on their single leg and when they want to take shelter from the sun stretch out and hold up their great foot like an umbrella."

== See also ==
- Aziza (African mythology)
- Congenital amputation
- Sirenomelia
- Fachan
- Invunche
- Kasa-obake
- Kui (Chinese mythology)
- Nasnas
- Saci (Brazilian folklore)
- Patasola
