= Fai Huan =

- Also known as: Masquerade
- Genre: Romance, Murder, Sorcery, Revenge
- Created by: Master Red
- Creative director: Marut Sarowat
- Country of origin: Thailand
- Original language: Thai
- No. of episodes: 13

Original release
- Network: Channel 7
- Release: May 19 – June 16, 2013

Fai Huan (Thai: ไฟหวน) is a Thai drama-revenge lakhon aired on BBTV Channel 7 in 120 minute episodes. The story is set in mid 20th century Thailand.

== Synopsis ==
The first wife of a wealthy military officer has only one daughter (Mathana). A jealous and possessive woman, she orders her maid to kill her husband's second wife and to set fire to the house. But the hapless second wife had just given birth and, against all odds, the baby is saved and brought up by the owner of a brothel.

When the baby (Bupha) grows up and becomes a beautiful young woman, she falls in love with a doctor, the same man that has been promised in marriage to Mathana, the daughter of the woman who had ordered her mother to be killed. Ruthless and determined she goes to work as a maid in the house of the high military officer. But the secret has been kept and they don't know that they are father and daughter. The vengeful spirit of his second wife appears to the military officer and prompts him to look for his lost daughter. Meanwhile, the girl makes powerful sorcery in order to get the doctor to fall in love with her.

== Cast ==
- Thanaphon Ninthyasuk (Tle Thanapol) - Doctor Ton
- Thanyasuphang Chiraprichan - Mathana, daughter of first wife
- Saemmi Khaowawen (Sammy) - Bupha, daughter of second wife
- Piyathida Mittiraroch - Madam Mani / Khun Ying Jaopak
- Pharadi Yuphasuk - Owner of the brothel
- Surawut Maikan - Military officer

== See also ==
- Phi Tai Hong
