= Ma bong =

Creature information
- Other names: Phi Ma bong; Phi Ma
- Grouping: Legendary creature
- Sub grouping: Hybrid beast
- Similar entities: Centaur; Kelpie; Tikbalang; Headless Horseman
- Folklore: Thai folklore

Origin
- Country: Thailand
- Region: Lanna (Northern)
- Habitat: Rural areas

Ma bong (Thai: ม้าบ้อง, pronounced [máː bɔ̂ːŋ], มาบอง, [máː bɔːŋ]), or Phi Ma bong (ผีม้าบ้อง, [pʰǐː máː bɔ̂ːŋ], ผีม้าบอง, [pʰǐː máː bɔ̂ːŋ]), simply Phi Ma (ผีม้า, [pʰǐː máː]) is a supernatural spirit believed by the Lanna people of northern Thailand. Its appearance and characteristics vary according to different stories. Some describe Ma bong as a creature with the lower body of a horse and the upper body of a human male, said to be the spirit of men who have never had sexual partners. Or some believe that it is the spirit of a dead horse, also believed Ma bong likes to nibble on dried buffalo heads. Others tell of it having the lower body of a horse and the upper body of a beautiful woman, who lures young men into intimate encounters before killing them.

Despite these variations, one consistent detail is Ma bong's association with horses. Its presence is often accompanied by sounds of neighing and galloping, and it mysteriously disappears, leaving behind only horse tracks.

A Lanna folk tale about Ma Bong comes in many versions. The most well-known tells of two young men who were close friends. One night, following the northern custom of going out to meet young women, they went together as usual. However, after walking together for some time, one friend suddenly separated and entered a thicket ahead. This continued for many nights, arousing suspicion. One night, the other friend decided to secretly follow him and saw a horrifying sight: his friend desperately licking the carcass of a buffalo's head in hunger, a gruesome and unsettling image.

Seeking help, he consulted a Buddhist monk who advised him to smear chili peppers on the buffalo's head. Later, when his friend returned to lick the head, he was met with the burning heat of the chili and fled in pain, only to encounter the first friend.

By then, his friend had become a spirit. With fiery red eyes, he chased after him. The fleeing man threw raw eggs behind him along the way, following the monk's advice. The spirit friend bent down to eat the eggs, driven by hunger. When the man reached his house, he hurried inside, ran up the stairs, and turned the staircase upside down to confuse the spirit.

The spirit friend arrived but could not climb the stairs, muttering repeatedly, "These stairs are wrong; this is not my house." (Note: Traditional Thai houses are built on stilts with an open space beneath the floor known as the undercroft. The stairs leading up to the house must be climbed to enter. According to local beliefs, reversing or turning the direction of the staircase can confuse or deceive spirits, preventing them from entering or leaving the house. This practice is often used as a protective measure against malevolent supernatural beings.) He wandered restlessly around the house all night. The man saw that his friend had become a Ma Bong, with the upper body of a man but the lower body of a horse.

The tale ends with different versions: some say that at dawn, the Ma bong died still in horse form; others say it writhed in agony, foaming at the mouth before finally reverting fully to human form and then dying.

One account comes from a deceased singer and actor originally from Phrae province. His hometown, located about 14 km (8.7 mi) from downtown Phrae, is surrounded by mountains with the Yom river flowing through it. According to village elders, Ma bong appears as a white horse ridden by an ancient warrior carrying weapons and a shield. It gallops along the village dirt roads from the mountains and vanishes after crossing the Yom river. The elders insist they have seen Ma bong themselves. The singer recalled that, as a teenager, he and his friends often gathered in the village to watch for its appearance, though they never managed to see it.

An elderly man from Tak province recounted that back in the late 1970s, he had seen Ma bong many times. He lived alone in a house beside a dirt road in Mueang Tak district, the provincial capital, which, despite being the most developed area at the time, still had no electricity or running water. He made a living raising livestock. One night, he heard the sound of hooves and a horse's neighing outside. When he peeked out under the dim moonlight, he saw a large black horse-like creature trotting contentedly with no rider. It didn't seem hostile. But in the morning, there were no hoofprints on the ground. Stranger still, no one in that area kept horses, not even in town. Horses were expensive and rare, and he had never seen anyone riding or even leading one.

Convinced it wasn't a normal animal, he believed it must have been Ma Bong. He added that it only ever appeared on the night of the shaving day (Note: One day before the Buddhist Sabbath.) during the Buddhist Lent, usually between early evening and around 10:00–11:00 p.m., never before or after.

In addition, there is a narrow alleyway between two houses near the Ping river in Chiang Mai province that is believed to be Ma bong's path.

Ma bong has also appeared in popular culture, featuring in at least two television dramas: Pom Pang Ban (2022) and Marvellous Love (2023), both aired on Channel 7 HD.

== Similar creatures ==
- Centaur
- Tikbalang
- Kelpie
- Headless Horseman

== See also ==
- Ghosts in Thai culture
