= Cha kla =

Thai ghost

Cha kla จะกละ
Creature information
- Other name(s): Phi Luang; Phi Cha kla Cha la
- Grouping: Legendary creature
- Sub grouping: Mythological feline
- Similar entities: Nekomata; Phi Ka
- Folklore: Thai folk mythology

Origin
- Country: Thailand
- Region: Central and Southern Regions
- Habitat: Dark rural areas Deep jungle

Cha kla (Thai: จะกละ, pronounced [t͡ɕà kà.lá]) or Phi Cha kla (ผีจะกละ, pronounced [pʰiː t͡ɕà kà.lá]) is a type of spirit in Thai folklore, said to resemble a wild cat. It is believed to be a malevolent spirit raised and controlled by warlocks to harm their enemies. In the southern regions of Thailand, it is known as phi luang (ผีล้วง, pronounced [pʰiː lɯ̂ːaŋ]).

Cha kla is considered a traditional Thai ghost belief with long-standing roots. It is documented in the Three Seals Law Code dating back over 300 years to the Ayutthaya period, where it is listed alongside other supernatural beings such as the Krasue. In the text, it is referred to as Cha la (จะหละ, pronounced [t͡ɕà.là]).

At first glance, Cha kla may appear no different from a normal house cat. However, its fur is pitch black with a coarse texture, lacking any shine. The hairs grow in reverse, flaring upward and forward. Its eyes glow deep red, like blood. Nocturnal by nature, Cha kla emerges only at night. It fears humans, and whenever it encounters people, or when people spot it, it immediately flees into its burrow. These creatures are said to dig underground holes for shelter, rarely venturing out during the day.

According to legend, Cha kla possesses a deadly aura. Even the mere sight or touch of it can cause death.

One such chilling event was said to have occurred in Krabi province, where an entire family was found dead in their home. The official cause, according to medical reports, was "sudden cardiac failure". However, the victims' relatives believed it was the work of Cha kla. Upon investigating the house, they found a strange deep burrow behind it, and around the entrance were tufts of black fur, believed to be from a cat.

== Similar entities ==
- Nekomata
