= Phong (ghost) =

Figure of Thai folklore

Phong ผีโพง
Creature information
- Other name(s): Phi Pao (ผีเป้า); Phi Pong (ผีโป่ง)
- Grouping: Legendary creature
- Sub grouping: Nocturnal, undead
- Similar entities: Krasue; Krahang; Pop
- Folklore: Thai folk mythology

Origin
- Country: Thailand
- Region: Lanna and Isan
- Habitat: Dark rural areas

Phi Phong (Thai: ผีโพง, pronounced [pʰīː pʰɔːŋ]; also known as Phi Pao (ผีเป้า, pronounced [pʰīː pǎw]) in northeastern Thailand) or simply Phong is a ghost found in northern Thai folklore. It is said to be the result of black magic gone awry—specifically from those who practice dark sorcery but fail to control the power within themselves.

This condition is believed to stem from raising a particular type of magical herb known as wan (Note: Wan (ว่าน, pronounced [wâːn]) is a general Thai term used to refer to certain types of plants, particularly those with underground bulbs or rhizomes. The word is often associated with plants believed to possess medicinal properties or mystical powers—such as invulnerability, charm, or supernatural protection. In most cases, the term wan is placed before the name of a plant, especially when referring to herbal remedies or ornamental plants that are believed to hold spiritual significance in traditional Thai belief systems.) phi phong (ว่านผีโพง, pronounced [wâːn pʰīː pʰɔːŋ])—a ghostly plant with white leaves, a fiery taste, and a glow that shines in the dark like a luminous woodlouse. As the plant matures, its leaves are said to change shape to resemble the face of the person raising it. Eventually, the cultivator transforms into Phi Phong.

By day, Phi Phong appears just like any ordinary person. But by night, it reveals its true form. A soft, flickering flame glows from within its nose, and a resin-like substance resembling dripping torch wax oozes down. Much like other Thai spirits such as Phi Krasue, Phi Krahang, or Phi Pop, Phi Phong seeks out filth to feed on—frogs, animal dung, rotting corpses, and afterbirth. It avoids humans, retreating into darkness whenever someone comes too close, making it almost impossible to follow or catch.

Normally, Phi Phong does not harm people unless provoked. When angered, it is known to throw objects—such as a widow's bamboo carrying pole or a stalk of banana tree—onto the roof of the person's home. Illness, misfortune, and even death are said to plague the entire household afterward.

There is one way to destroy a Phi Phong: if someone correctly identifies and speaks aloud that a particular person is a Phi Phong, the spirit loses its power and dies.

The condition is also contagious. Much like the lore surrounding Phi Krasue, Phi Phong can pass its spirit to another through its saliva. If someone unknowingly ingests it—by drinking contaminated water or sharing utensils—the curse is passed on.

In the village of Ban Nong Phi Lok (บ้านหนองผีหลอก, pronounced [bâːn nɔ̌ːŋ pʰīː lɔ̂ːk], lit. '"Village of the Haunting Ghost"') in Phlapphla subdistrict, Chok Chai district of Nakhon Ratchasima province, eerie stories have been told for generations. Located roughly 5 km (3.1 mi) from the district centre, the area is surrounded by cassava and rice fields. It is said that a vast marsh—nearly 100 rai (approximately 39.5 acres) in size—once sat beside a dirt road there. Locals claim that Phi Phong frequently appeared near the marsh at night, causing people to avoid traveling the area after dark. To this day, the village remains unofficial, never formally registered as a settlement.

From late April to early May 2020, at Ban Wang Ai Jeet in Nong Bua Rawe district, Chaiyaphum province, local villagers reported seeing strange red lights floating over the rice fields and agricultural plots around the village. The first person to witness the phenomenon claimed that he heard a sound resembling a cat crying out, as if it were being beaten. Some villagers said they noticed what appeared to be bat-like wings on the sides of the strange object. The story attracted reporters from several news outlets, who traveled to the village to investigate. They reportedly saw the strange light themselves on the first night they arrived and were able to capture images and videos of it. However, after staying in the area for two or three days, they were unable to see it again. A 15-year-old boy managed to photograph the mysterious light. He later claimed that the light began following him, forcing him to speed away on his motorcycle. The following day at around noon, he reportedly began exhibiting behavior resembling spirit possession. He appeared unable to control himself and ran toward the forest at the edge of the village. He did not return to his normal state until around 4 p.m. Local people believed that the phenomenon might have been caused by a Phi Phong, or perhaps a Phi Krasue. Others believed that it could have been a manifestation of supernatural power by the local tutelary deities.

On October 21, 2020, a video recording was captured in Surin province showing a red orb of light floating up and down in the sky. It was believed to be the fire of a Phi Phong. According to one informant, who openly stated that he had once studied black magic and previously kept a Phi Phong, the practice is rooted in Khmer occult traditions. The spirit is said to be kept inside a small container resembling a balm jar or a wax box, within which a worm-like creature or a small white larva is placed. Over time, depending on the spells that have been invoked, the larva transforms into a wax-like substance. Different practitioners are said to nourish the spirit in different ways—some feed it with gold leaf or rolled gold sheets, while others feed it with needles. When fed with gold leaf, for example, the offering would gradually dissolve within the container, accompanied by incantations inscribed with black magic. The Phi Phong is believed to grant its keeper supernatural protection, such as invulnerability to weapons or physical harm. However, strict observance of the associated rituals is required. If the keeper fails to uphold these practices, the spirit may break free and attack people instead.

A recent sighting drew public attention on the morning of Sunday, October 29, 2023—coinciding with the Buddhist festival of Wan Ok Phansa. Around 5:00 AM in Thep Sathit district, Chaiyaphum province, a 17-year-old girl filmed a mysterious floating light in front of her house. The light appeared to split into two and ascended into the treetops before drifting over rice fields and vanishing into dense forest. Security camera footage confirmed the sighting. Locals believed it to be Phi Phong.

Phi Phong has made appearances in pop culture as well. It was featured as one of the regional ghosts in Lhorn (หลอน), a 2003 Thai horror anthology film exploring supernatural beliefs across Thailand's four regions, with Phi Phong representing the north. It was referenced alongside Phi Pop in Tha Rae: The Exorcist (ท่าแร่) (2025), the first Thai film to blend Christian-style exorcism with traditional local ghost beliefs. Phi Pong is also referenced in the 2026 Netflix mystery investigative series Delusion. The series follows a family in Chiang Khan district, Loei province, whose child goes missing. Within the series, the disappearance is attributed to a Phi Pong believed to have originated from the family.

== See also ==
- Thai ghosts
- Mandrake
