= Nasnas =

Monstrous creature from Arabic folklore

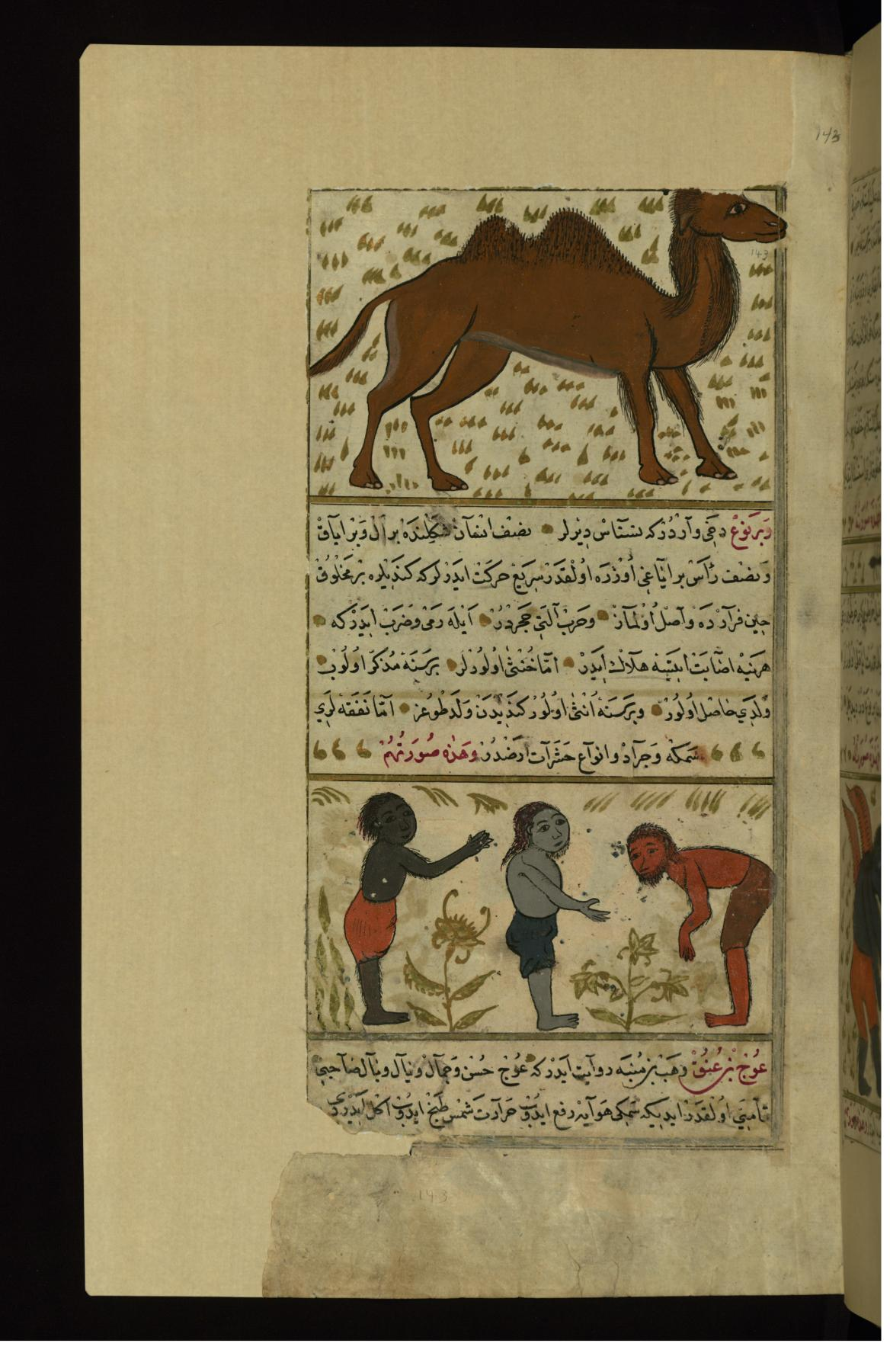
"A Camel and Three Strange Single-handed and Single-legged Creatures", Muhammad ibn Muhammad Shakir Ruzmah-i Nathani, from Walters Ms. W.659, a Turkish version of The Wonders of Creation

In Arab culture, the nasnās (Arabic: نسناس, romanized: nasnās, plural نَسَانِيس nisānīs) is a monopod, a monstrous creature. According to Edward William Lane, the 19th-century translator of One Thousand and One Nights, a nasnas is "half a human being; having half a head, half a body, one arm, one leg, with which it hops with much agility".

In Somali mythology, there is a similar creature, the xunguruuf (Somali pronunciation: [ħunguruːf]), that can kill a person by just touching them, stripping them of their flesh in mere seconds. It was believed to be the offspring of a jinn called shiqq (الشق) and a human being.

Although the nasnās has not been found in any Sunni Islam interpretation of the Quran, they are sometimes mentioned in Shiʿi sources. Mention of the nasnās revolves around Surah 2:30, when God announces to the angels to create humans as a successor on earth. Accordingly, while the angels lived in heaven, jinns and nisānīs lived on earth. After 70,000 years, God lifted the veil between the seven heavens and the Earth, and the angels saw that they had done injustice and bloodshed. The angels complained that such destruction could not be tolerated in God's creation, so God decided to replace them. Although similar stories exist in Sunni sources, they do not mention the nisānīs, but only jinns. Nisānīs in Shia sources are often portrayed as a prototype of Shiʿi opponents, while jinns are believed to be obedient to the Imamate.

A character in "The Story of the Sage and the Scholar", a tale from the collection, is turned into a nasnās after a magician applies kohl to one of his eyes. The nasnās is mentioned in Gustave Flaubert's The Temptation of Saint Anthony.

== See also ==
- Fachan
- Monopod (creature)
- Shayatin

== Sources ==
- Robert Irwin, The Arabian Nights: a Companion (Penguin, 1994)
- Jorge Luis Borges, The Book of Imaginary Beasts (Penguin, 1974)
