= Phi Pu Ya =

Thai Ghost

Phi Pu Ya (Thai: ผีปู่ย่า, RTGS: phi pu ya, pronounced pʰǐ pû jâ) are ancestral spirits widely worshipped in Thailand, especially in the northern regions.

The term refers to the belief in ancestral spirits, particularly the spirits of grandparents and elder ancestors, who are revered as protectors of families and communities in many parts of Thailand. Rooted in pre-Buddhist animist traditions, this belief is practiced among various ethnolinguistic groups such as the Thai people, the Lao people (see Laos on map), and the Mon people (an ethnic group historically native to Myanmar and Thailand). It is found across the northern (e.g., Chiang Mai, Lamphun), northeastern (e.g., Maha Sarakham), central (e.g., Pathum Thani, Ratchaburi), and some parts of the southern regions.

The worship of Phi Pu Ya involves rituals, offerings, and traditional spirit dances performed to honor and communicate with the ancestors. In northern Thailand, rituals such as the Mod-Meng Spirit Dance reflect the integration of ancestral beliefs into regional culture and health practices. In Mon communities, ancestral rituals serve as a foundation for kinship, social unity, and intergenerational transmission of values

Over time, these traditions have merged with Theravada Buddhist practices, including merit-making, monk-led chanting, and spirit house offerings, resulting in a hybrid spiritual system that continues to shape cultural identity, kinship structures, and moral values in rural Thai society.

== Origins ==
The belief in Phi Pu Ya, or ancestral “Grandfather Grandmother Spirits,” is shared across multiple ethnolinguistic communities in Thailand, including Thai, Lao, and Mon peoples. It is found throughout the country in the North (e.g., Chiang Mai, Lamphun), Northeast (e.g., Maha Sarakham, Roi Et), Central, and even Southern regions.

This belief has roots in pre-Buddhist animist traditions, where it was thought that the spirits of deceased elders remained near the household, continuing to influence the health, morality, and fortune of living descendants. The spirits are seen not just as protectors, but also as moral overseers of the family.

Rituals to honor Phi Pu Ya vary by region but commonly include offerings, spirit dances, and communication ceremonies. In many communities, women-especially elder daughters are seen as caretakers of these traditions. Over time, these animist practices were blended with Theravada Buddhist elements, incorporating monk-led chanting and merit-making.

Today, the belief in Phi Pu Ya remains a living part of Thai spiritual life, especially in rural communities, where it supports kinship structures and reinforces cultural continuity.

== Traditional beliefs ==
Traditional Beliefs in Thailand play an important role in shaping local ways of life and cultures. Belief in ghosts and ancestral spirits continues to be practiced across communities. Important examples include the ancestral spirit worship of the Mon ethnic group in Central Thailand and the ritual spirit beliefs associated with Fon Phi Mod Phi Meng (Spirit Dances) in the Lanna cultural context of Northern Thailand. These beliefs reflect the strong relationship between humans, ancestors and supernatural forces that maintain social and spiritual wellbeing within the community.

=== Central Thailand ===
Belief in ancestral spirits worship among Mon people serves as a core foundation of family and kinship organization. Ancestral spirits are regarded as protectors of living descendants. Ritual acts, including ancestral worship and offering to ancestral spirits are continued practicing in Mon communities. These represent the keys that sustain the Mon's traditional values across generations.

At Ban Klongkha Nua in Photharam District, Ratchaburi Province, the rituals remain strong in daily life. Descendants must be honored to the ancestral spirits by the ceremony that passed down for generations.

In Sam Khok District, Pathum Thani Province, ancestral beliefs remain central to social relations. Rituals dedicated to ancestral spirits help preserve kinship structures and the community's collective wellbeing, reinforcing a shared Mon cultural identity even within a rapidly modernizing context.

=== Northern Thailand ===
Belief in spirits has been a part of Lanna society in everyday life for ages. The Fon Phi Mod Phi Meng ritual is a significant ceremonial practice reflecting Lanna communities’ ongoing interaction with spirits that influence health, safety, and communal harmony. Spirits are regarded not as malevolent entities, but as guardians responsible for sustaining social balance.

The ritual typically involves spirit invoking dance and offerings performed with the intention of healing illnesses, removing misfortune, and invoking blessings. Participation is collective, emphasizing social cohesion and shared responsibility for community wellbeing.

The prominence of such practices demonstrates the enduring role of spiritual beliefs in maintaining cultural identity and supporting communal resilience within the changing landscape of contemporary Northern Thailand.

== Representation and Sacred Places ==
=== Representation of Ancestral Spirits ===
The worship of ancestral spirits is an expression of respect, faith, and gratitude toward deceased ancestors or forebears such as grandparents, great-grandparents, or other elder relatives who are regarded as family patrons. This belief reflects the deep bond between the living and their ancestors, expressed through rituals and symbolic practices passed down through generations.

In some Thai communities, each family line possesses its own “spiritual clan symbols”, which are unique identifiers inherited from ancient times. These symbols are generally divided into two types:

==== Abstract symbols of spiritual clans ====
These are symbolic representations established since the founding of each lineage, such as:

- Snake spirit
- Turtle spirit
- Chicken spirit
- Fish spirit
- Horse spirit
- Sticky rice spirit
- Doll spirit
- Other spirit groups

==== Tangible symbols of spiritual clans ====
These include physical objects used to represent the ancestors and in ritual practices, such as:

- Cloth Spirit (Phi Pha): Garments belonging to the deceased ancestors are folded neatly, wrapped in white or colored cloth, and placed in a “spirit chest” (heeph phii), which is kept near the sacred spirit pillar inside the house.
- Bamboo Tube Spirit: Seven to nine small bamboo tubes are cut with one node intact, wrapped with white and red threads, filled with clean water and sacred leaves (such as kha kai dam or saniat leaves), and then hung near the spirit pillar during ancestral worship rituals.

=== Sacred Places of Ancestral Spirits ===
In many Thai and Mon communities, the designated places for ancestral spirits are arranged with symbolic meaning and spiritual order.

==== The Spirit Room in the Main House ====
Traditional houses are divided into three principal sections:

- Main hall (Be’ah Hoi’) - The central area of the house, serving as both the master’s bedroom and the dwelling place of the ancestral spirits. The main pillar (Sao Ek) within this area is regarded as the “spirit pillar.”
- Veranda (Ka Mieng Hoi’) - A slightly lower-level platform connected to the main hall, used for daily activities.
- Outer terrace (Ha Yu Hoi’) - The lowest section, often used for welcoming guests or general household work.

==== Spirit Dance Hall (Rong Ram Phii) ====
This is a temporary wooden structure built specifically for the “Spirit Dance Ritual” (Ram Phii) performed by each spiritual clan. The design, size, and materials follow traditional standards passed down through generations, symbolizing sacred wisdom and community unity during the ritual.

==== Spirit Pillar (Sao Phii) – The Main Pillar of Mon Houses ====
Among Mon communities, it is believed that ancestral spirits reside in the main pillar located at the southeast cornerof the house or within the “Spirit Room” of the main hall. Sacred objects representing the spirits are usually placed near this pillar, including:

- Wooden or metal chests
- Lidded bamboo baskets
- Zinc containers
- Ancestral spirit cloths
- Bamboo baskets with handlesRitual utensils for spirit offerings

==== Other Sacred Locations ====
Apart from the interior of the house, Phi Pu Ya spirits are also believed to inhabit calm and sacred areas such as:

- Above the headboard on the eastern wall of the sleeping area
- Corners of rooms near auspicious or end pillars
- Small spirit houses built under large trees or in shaded corners of household fences

These areas serve as “spirit shrines” or “ancestral houses” acting as spiritual centers where family members communicate with, venerate, and express gratitude to their ancestral spirits.

== Rituals, practices, and cultural influence ==
The worship of Phi Pu Ya is part of the broader belief system of ancestral veneration found in many regions of Thailand, particularly among Mon communities in the Central Region and Lanna communities in the North. This belief reflects the country's animistic cultural roots and its integration with Buddhism. The ritual expresses respect and remembrance toward deceased ancestors who are believed to continue protecting their descendants. Ceremonies are typically held at home or at the household spirit shrine (san phii reuan), led by the family head or an elder. Family members prepare offerings, express apologies or gratitude, and report significant events, all according to customs inherited across generations. Each ritual is performed with solemn respect, avoiding any breach of traditional taboos.

The Phi Pu Ya ceremony is not only a religious observance but also a social mechanism that reinforces kinship and community cohesion. Some scholars interpret the collective participation in such rites as a means of preserving moral values such as filial piety, unity, and responsibility toward one's lineage-values regarded as the spiritual foundation of rural Thai society.

Before each annual ceremony, the family renews the khan phii pu ya (ancestral offering tray) and replaces all ritual items to symbolize purity and devotion. The offerings typically include items representing prosperity and good fortune, such as a flower tray with paired candles used to invite ancestral spirits, betel leaves, areca nuts, seven-colored cloths, and auspicious leaves like jackfruit, star gooseberry, and bamboo. Cooked dishes, fruits, desserts, and white liquor are also offered. While specific items vary across regions, the central purpose remains to honor and invite ancestral spirits in an atmosphere of peace and auspiciousness.

The ritual follows long-standing rules intended to preserve its ceremonial integrity. Generally, it is performed only once a year, preferably in the same month annually, while Saturdays and waning-moon days are avoided as inauspicious. Pregnant women within the family customarily abstain from attending and may rejoin one year after childbirth. The ceremony usually takes place at the ancestral shrine or household spirit altar, and when a family builds a new house, a special rite is conducted to relocate the shrine and invite the ancestral spirits to inhabit the new home. These practices embody the enduring connection between the living and the dead and the reverence accorded to ancestral spirits within the family.

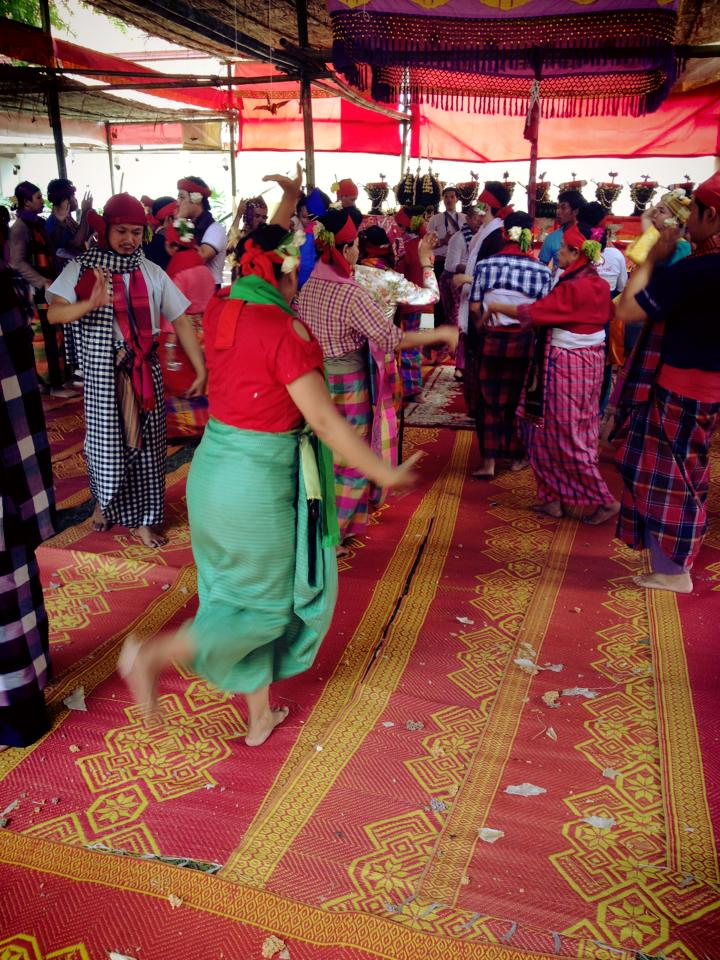
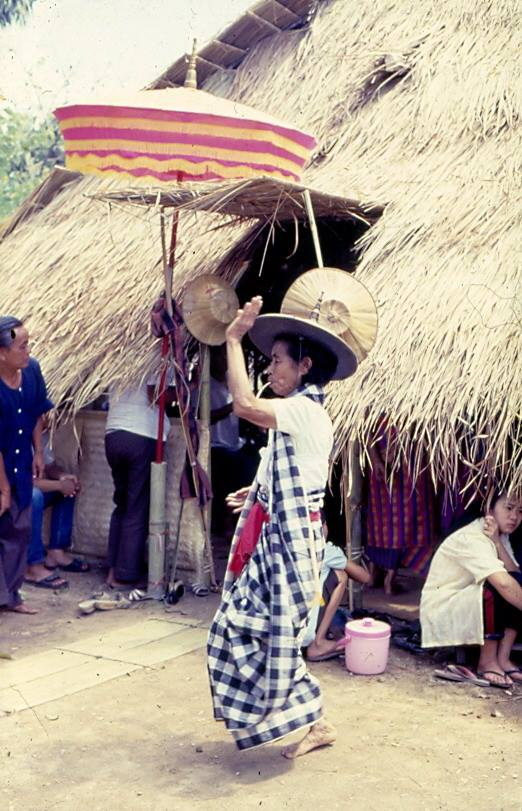
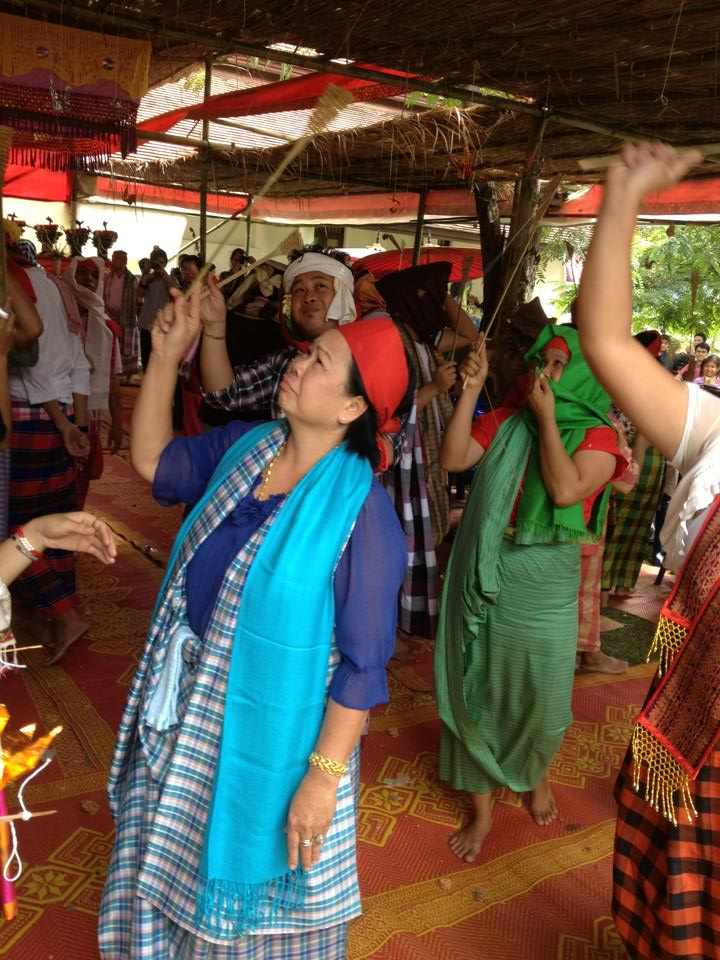
Spirit-dance

In some communities, Phi Pu Ya veneration includes ritual or spirit-dance performances conducted to honor the ancestral spirits. Dancers, often women from the community, perform slow and graceful movements accompanied by traditional music or rhythmic drumming, symbolizing the act of inviting and pleasing the spirits. The dance not only serves as a spiritual offering but also functions as a communal activity that reinforces kinship and shared heritage. In Mon and Northern Thai traditions, such performances have evolved into cultural expressions displayed at local festivals, preserving both the ritual and its artistic significance.

Beliefs surrounding Phi Pu Ya continue to influence the cultural life of many Thai communities. Certain ceremonies—such as Sart Mon (the Mon merit-making festival), household ancestral offerings, and the ok saan (“departing the shrine”) ritual—are still observed in some lineages. Others, such as merit-making for ancestors during the Songkran festival or bang sukhon memorial offerings on death anniversaries, have been adapted into Buddhist contexts. These continuities illustrate how ancestral spirit worship has evolved and integrated into contemporary Buddhist and modern Thai society.

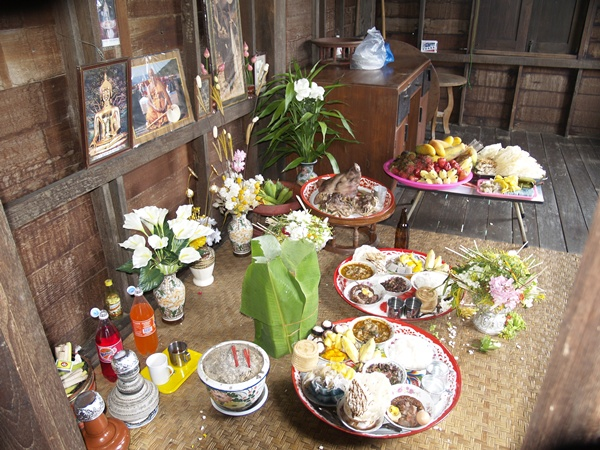
Household ancestral offerings
