= Kru Kai Kaew =

Supernatural figure worshipped in Thailand

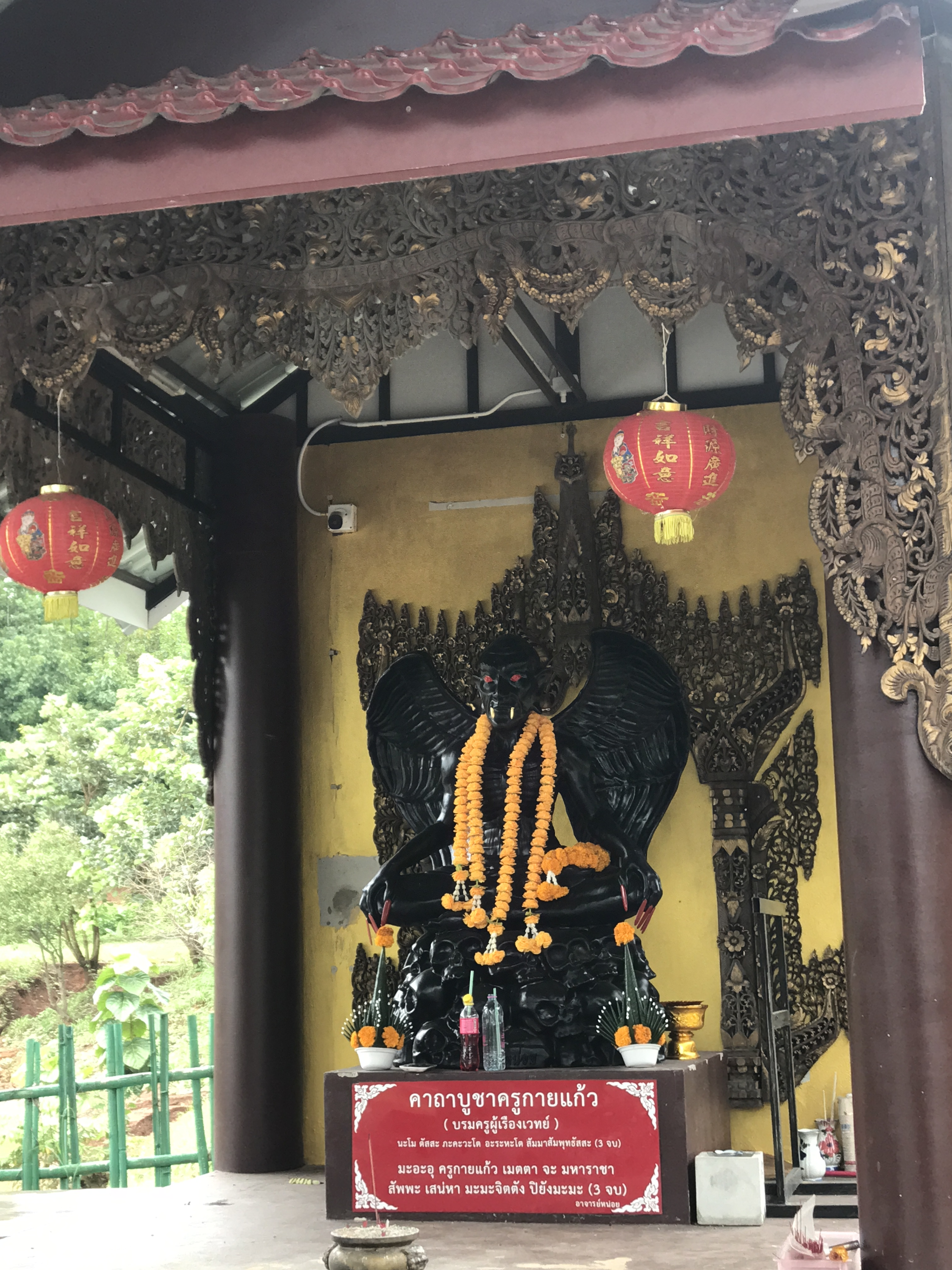
Kru Kai Kaew shrine in Mae Sot

Kru Kai Kaew (Thai: ครูกายแก้ว), also spelt Kru Guy Kaeo or Khru Kai Kaew, is a supernatural figure worshipped in Thailand for wealth, good fortune and success in work and business. He is depicted as a dark, winged figure with fangs and claws. Some followers regard him as a deity who can grant wishes, while others have questioned his origins and the religious practices surrounding his worship.

== Origin and history ==
The origins of Kru Kai Kaew are unclear. Some followers claim that he was a teacher of mystical arts during the reign of Jayavarman VII, who ruled the Khmer Empire in the late 12th and early 13th centuries. However, historians have found no evidence that Kru Kai Kaew existed during the king's reign.

Another account tells of a Thai monk from Lampang province who travelled to Angkor Wat in Cambodia to practise meditation. According to the story, the monk saw the spirit of Kru Kai Kaew during meditation and obtained a small figure representing him. After returning to Thailand, he gave the figure to Thawil Milindachinda, a singer in a military band. Thawil later passed it to Suchart Ratanasuk, an astrologer and practitioner of religious rituals.

Suchart was involved in astrology and the creation of religious images. He also helped establish shrines dedicated to Hindu deities in Bangkok. According to an account discussed by scholar Peter A. Jackson, Suchart had a vision of Kru Kai Kaew seated in meditation, with red eyes, long curved fingernails, golden fangs, and wings. He drew the figure he had seen and commissioned a statue based on the drawing. The earlier figure passed down from the monk was described as a small human-shaped image. Suchart's statue had a different appearance, resembling a creature that was partly human and partly bird. The later representations of Kru Kai Kaew were based on this design. Suchart died in November 2017, and members of his family continued to take part in rituals dedicated to the figure.

== Appearance and worship ==
Kru Kai Kaew is commonly depicted with dark skin, two wings, golden fangs, red eyes and long claws. His appearance has been compared to the gargoyles found on European buildings. Some followers describe him as a powerful teacher of mystical arts.

Worshippers make offerings and pray for wealth, business success, and other wishes. Some also ask for winning lottery numbers. Followers regard Kru Kai Kaew as a figure who can bring good fortune, although critics have questioned his religious origins.

Kru Kai Kaew is also worshipped in Hong Kong, where some followers regard him as a god of wealth.

=== Mantra ===
One mantra used in the worship of Kru Kai Kaew has been recorded as follows:

Namo Tassa Bhagavāto Arahato Sammā Sambuddhassa

Maha Kru Kai Kaew Metta Maha Raja Sappaseneha Mama Chittang Piyang Mama.

== Controversies ==
=== Installation of the Bangkok statue ===
On 9 August 2023, a five-metre-tall statue of Kru Kai Kaew was transported through Bangkok for installation outside the Bazaar Hotel on Ratchadaphisek Road. During transportation, the statue became stuck beneath a pedestrian overpass because of its height. The incident caused traffic congestion and attracted public attention.

After its installation, the statue attracted worshippers who came to make offerings and ask for good fortune. Its appearance also caused criticism. Some people considered the figure frightening and called for its removal, while followers defended their right to worship it.

In August 2023, a woman from Lampang reported winning 100,000 baht in the lottery and credited her success to prayers to Kru Kai Kaew.

=== Animal-sacrifice controversy ===
In August 2023, social media posts claimed that animals, including puppies, kittens and rabbits, could be sacrificed to Kru Kai Kaew in exchange for good fortune. Some posts reportedly sought to purchase young animals for this purpose. The claims caused criticism and concern about animal welfare.

However, there was no confirmed evidence that these animal sacrifices had taken place. Some followers of Kru Kai Kaew rejected the claims and stated that worship of the figure did not require harming animals. Nattawut Rattanasuk, a devotee involved in the worship of Kru Kai Kaew, also opposed animal sacrifice.

=== Public objections and removal ===
On 17 August 2023, a group called National Thai Citizens submitted a complaint to Bangkok Governor Chadchart Sittipunt, asking for the statue to be removed. The group raised concerns about its appearance and the reports of possible animal sacrifice. Bangkok authorities subsequently examined complaints and the legal status of the installation.

The Council of Artists for the Promotion of Buddhism also called for the statue's removal. The group argued that its appearance promoted black magic and conflicted with Buddhist teachings. The council submitted objections to the hotel's management.

In December 2023, the State Railway of Thailand ordered the removal of the Kru Kai Kaew statue and other religious statues from the front of the Bazaar Hotel. The installation was found to have violated restrictions on construction and the use of the railway's leased land. A fine of approximately 1.3 million baht was imposed.

On 28 December 2023, the statues were removed from the front of the hotel and temporarily moved to the rear of the property. The removal followed the dispute over the installation and the use of the site.

== Scholarly interpretations ==
Historian Thongtong Chandransu stated that he had not seen historical evidence confirming that Kru Kai Kaew was a teacher of King Jayavarman VII. He questioned the source of this account and whether it had any basis in Khmer history.

Komkrit Uitekkeng, a scholar at Silpakorn University, explained that the worship of guardian spirits has a long history in Thailand, but the worship of figures such as Kru Kai Kaew and Mae Nak in their present forms is more recent. He stated that the image of Kru Kai Kaew came from the personal beliefs of Suchart Ratanasuk. Komkrit compared its appearance to the gargoyles of European Gothic churches but said that it was not possible to confirm whether Suchart had used them as inspiration.

Historian Thepmontri Limpaphayom also suggested that Kru Kai Kaew's appearance may have been inspired by European gargoyles. He rejected the claimed connection between Kru Kai Kaew and Jayavarman VII, arguing that the figure did not belong to ancient Khmer religious traditions.

Buddhist scholar Jaturong Chongasa described the worship of Kru Kai Kaew as a new religious movement with little connection to traditional Buddhist practices. Religious scholar Sinchai Chaowcharoenrat also criticised the figure, suggesting that its appearance combined elements of Western supernatural imagery with Thai and Khmer religious themes.

In a 2025 academic study, Peter A. Jackson examined the worship of Kru Kai Kaew as an example of how new supernatural figures become objects of devotion in Thailand.
