= Mae sue =

Guardian spirit in Thai culture

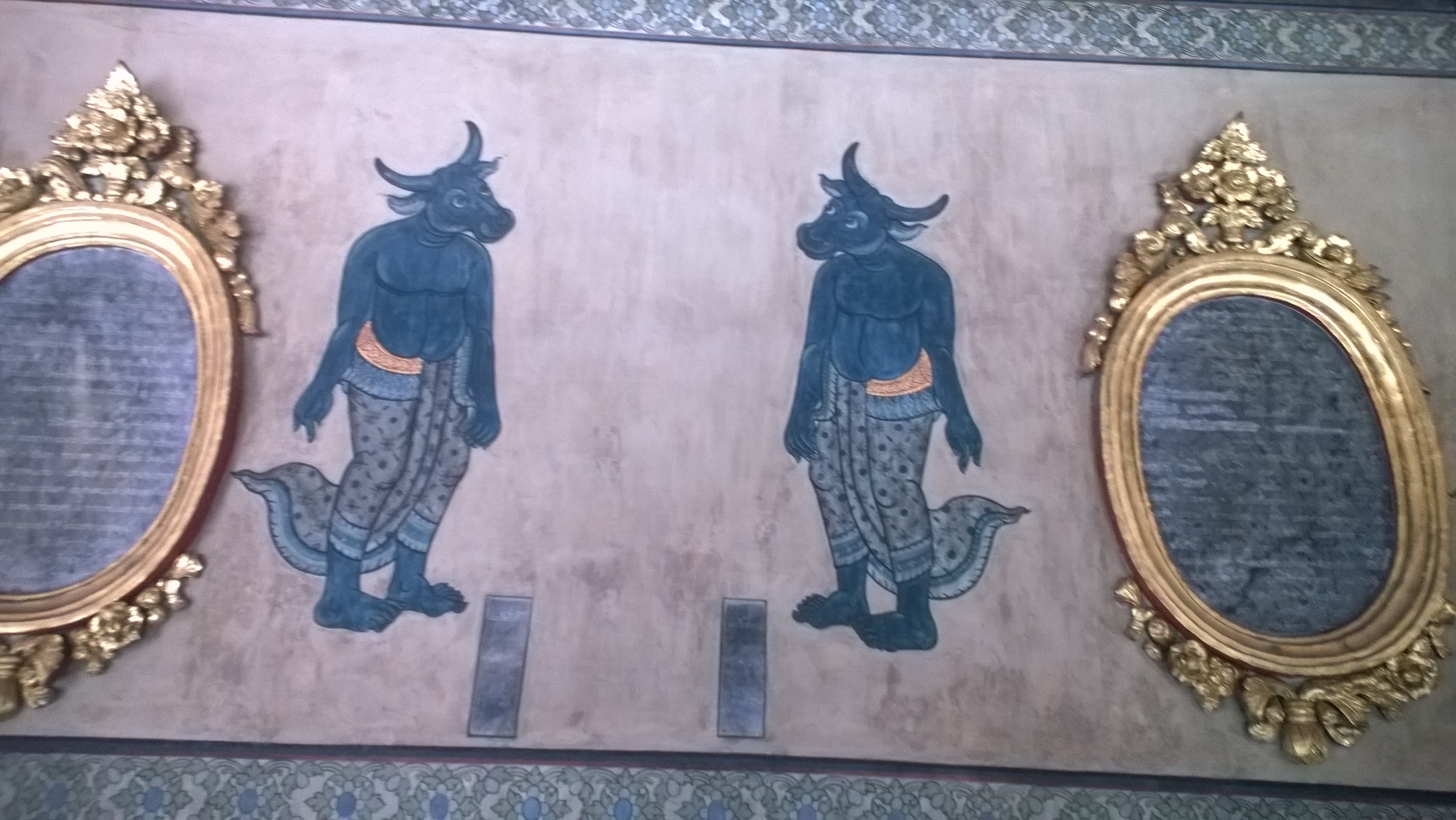
Lady yakbrisut (ยักษบริสุทธิ์) Tuesday - Pink skin and a buffalo head.

Mae Sue (Thai: แม่ซื้อ) is the guardian goddess and female ghost of infants, one of the benevolent guardian spirits in Thai culture. These female spirits are considered to protect whatever is related to their names. Mae Sue literally means Mother of Buying; when a baby is born it is believed that Mae Sue comes and buys the baby in order to keep it out of the reach of evil spirits. On the other hand, Mae Sue is also believed to be the cause of illness in children.

Mae Sue is scarcely mentioned in literature and is mentioned only in a few works about Thailand. Author Lucien Hanks mentions the following local belief from a village she studied in the Central Plain: "The child is not fully human the first three days. This period was under the supernatural control of Mother Su, for babies never died during the first 3 days after birth."

Different regions in Thailand have different views of Mae Sue.

== Appearance ==
The appearance and character of the Mae Sue depends on which Mae Sue is assigned to each day of the week:

Lady vijitmawan Murals in Wat Pho.	Lady vijitmawan (วิจิตรมาวรรณ) Sunday - Red skin and the head of a singha (female nymph) and a lion.
Lady Wannanongkran Murals in Wat Pho.	Lady Wannanongkran(วรรณนงคราญ) Monday - Ivory skin and a horse's head
Lady yakbrisut Murals in Wat Pho.	Lady yakbrisut (ยักษบริสุทธิ์) Tuesday - Pink skin and a buffalo head
Lady samolthat Murals in Wat Pho.	Lady samolthat (สามลทัศ) Wednesday - Green skin and an elephant's head
	Lady Kalotuk (กาโลทุกข์)Thursday - Pale yellow skin and a deer's head
Lady yaknongyao Murals in Wat Pho.	Lady yaknongyao(ยักษ์นงเยาว์) Friday - Pale blue skin and a cow's head
Lady A kalai Murals in Wat Pho.	Lady A kalai (เอกาไลย์”) Saturday - Black skin and a tiger's head.

d

All of them wear golden robes.

== Rites ==
=== Ron Kra Dong (ร่อนกระด้ง) ===
People put an infant in a threshing basket and say “It has been a child of ghosts for three days. It’s been a child of humans for four days. Who are the parents? Take them.(สามวันลูกผี สี่วันลูกคน ลูกของใคร ใครเอาไปเน้อ)”. They believe after parents hold the infant, Mae Sue will no longer be worrying about the infant.

=== Jook haircut (จุก) ===
Parents put clay dolls with different styles of the jook haircut, an ancient Thai hairstyle, near the infant. The infant will be given the hairstyle of the first doll they grab as it is believed that Mae Sue made the infant catch the doll he or she likes. They will have a rite to change the hairstyle again when the girl turns 11 years old and a boy turns 13–15 years old.
