= Phut Phi Pisat Thai =

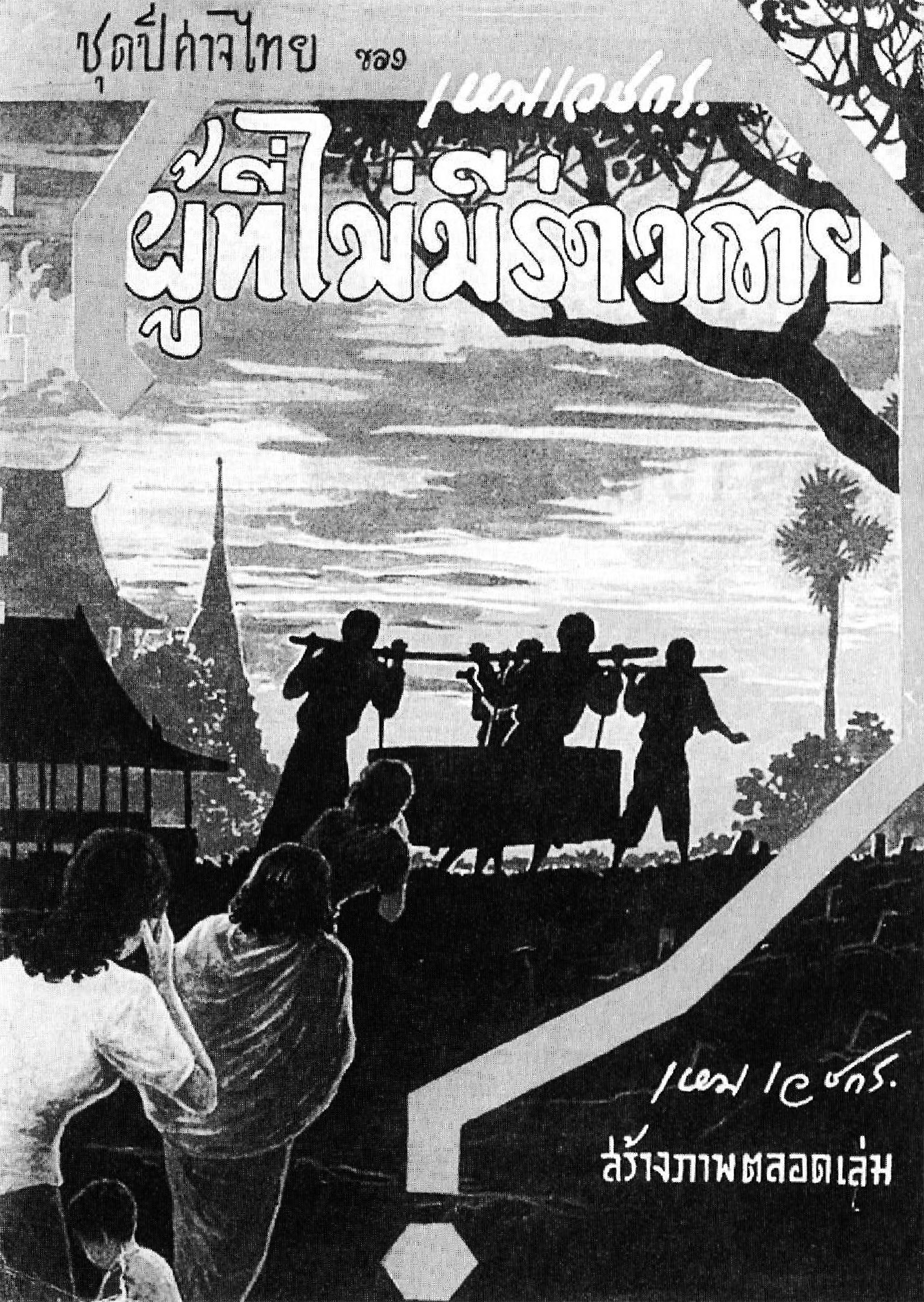
- Author: Hem Vejakorn
- Country: Thailand
- Language: Thai
- Genre: Horror, Ghost, Mystery, Belief, Fantasy
- Publisher: Bannakarn Publishing (First published); Viriya Publishing (Second published); Commoner Publishing (Third published)
- Published: 1933 – 1969
- Media type: Publications

Phut Phi Pisat Thai (Thai: ภูตผีปีศาจไทย) it is a collection of short horror stories by the famous painter Hem Vejakorn, published between 1933 and 1969. A total of 100 stories are divided into 5 volumes: Thai Demons (ปีศาจของไทย; 19 stories), Wandering Spirits (วิญญาณที่เร่ร่อน; 19 stories), Bodiless People (ผู้ที่ไม่มีร่างกาย; 16 stories), People from the Dark City (ผู้มาจากเมืองมืด; 20 stories), and Who is in the Air (ใครอยู่ในอากาศ; 26 stories).

The collection of Phut Phi Pisat Thai was first published in 1966 by Bannakarn Publishing.Later, the year 2003, which was the 100th anniversary of Hem's birth, ITV and the Rak Kru Hem group adapted 17 short stories into a horror TV drama called Ghost! Spirits and Bonds (ผี! วิญญาณและความผูกพัน).The story of the unsociable man (มนุษย์ผู้ไม่สังคมโลก) was divided into two parts by the creators because it was the longest of all of Hem's ghost stories.

In the same year, Viriya Publishing reprinted the five volumes of the Phut Phi Pisat Thai short story collection, but this time the illustrations were incomplete. After that, all five volumes were presented in complete audio format via the YouTube channel, Pra Jer Pee (พระเจอผี), and the program “Library Behind the Microphone” (ห้องสมุดหลังไมค์) on Thai PBS Radio Online.

Later in 2023, on the occasion of the 120th anniversary of Hem's birth, the Hem Vejakorn Foundation (formerly known as the Boromkhru Foundation), the foundation that solely oversees the copyright of Hem's works, signed a memorandum of understanding to assign Commoner Publishing to publish a new set of 5 ghost novels, Phut Phi Pisat Thai, with some illustrations that were later discovered and 6 short stories in the Phi Thai series that were published separately, using a new order of the stories and revising the manuscript to be accurate and complete according to Hem's writing style.
