= Shiqq =

Monstrous creature from Arabic folklore

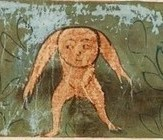
Illustration of a shiqq in Zakariya al-Qazwini's Ajā’ib al-makhlūqāt ("The Marvels of Creation"), first published in 1280

Shiqq is a type of jinn that is considered lower in rank and is described as only being half-formed, resulting in a monstrous appearance. They were mentioned in pre-Islamic Arabia. After Islam, they remained a part of Bedouin folklore, overlapping to some extent with the ghoul.

== See also ==
- Nasnas
