= Royal Institute Dictionary =

Official dictionary of the Thai language

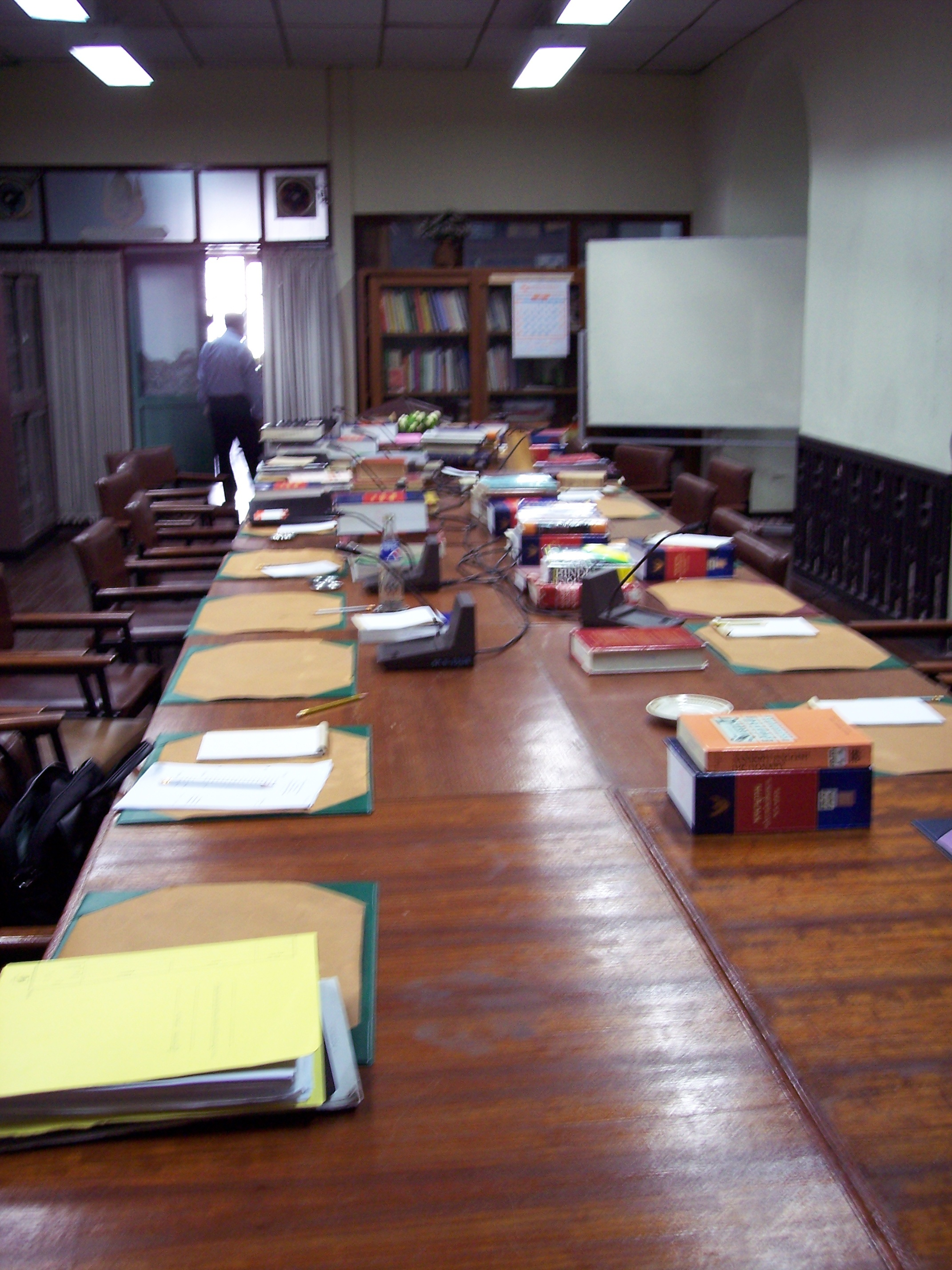
A conference room in the former building of the Royal Institute, following a meeting of the Dictionary Revision Commission.

The Royal Institute Dictionary (RID; Thai: พจนานุกรม ฉบับราชบัณฑิตยสถาน, RTGS: Photchananukrom Chabap Ratchabandittayasathan, pronounced [pʰót.tɕā.nāː.nú(ʔ).krōm tɕʰā.bàp râːt.tɕʰā.bān.dìt.tā.já(ʔ).sā.tʰǎːn]) is the official and prescriptive dictionary of Thai language, published by the Royal Society of Thailand.

The Royal Society of Thailand has published four fully revised editions of the dictionary, and many intermittent reprintings with minor revisions. Each of the major revisions is associated with a significant year in Thai history, although in the case of the 1999 and 2011 editions, the actual publication date is a later year.

== Status ==
The dictionary is the only prescriptive and official dictionary of Thai words. It has also frequently been used by the courts in interpreting the general meanings of the words in dispute, although the RIT has issued a statement that the dictionary is not intended to produce legal effect concerning cases.

One of the most notable legal cases is the case of a transgender person who applied for judicial permission to change their title from "Mister" to "Miss" in 1986, as the law at that time only allowed a female to use the latter title. The applicant argued that they could be considered a female, since they had undergone gender reassignment, having their sexual organ removed and having breasts augmented, etc. The Supreme Court of Justice ruled that, according to the RID 1982, a female is "a person that can be pregnant", and denied the application.

Another notable case is that of Samak Sundaravej, then prime minister, who was accused of conflict of interest in 2008. The Election Commission and the Senate jointly complained before the Constitutional Court that Samak worked for a private commercial business while in office. The Constitution of the Kingdom of Thailand, Buddhist Era 2550 (2007), prohibits a public officer from being an employee of any person, especially a commercial business. Samak argued that he had not been paid for hosting two cookery shows in question, Tasting and Grumbling and All Set at 6 am, and could not be regarded as an employee under the Civil and Commercial Code or the law on labour. The court decided that the term "employee" in the constitution conveys a general meaning. As the RID 1999 defines an "employee" as "a person who agrees to work for another person, irrespective of how he is called", the court found Samak guilty and terminated his ministership, removing him from office in consequence.

== Revision method ==
The methodology of the Dictionary Revision Commission (DRC) of the RIT has remained virtually unchanged for more than 70 years. The RID is produced by the DRC which is a relatively small group of experienced Thai scholars, convening at least once per week and working through the previous edition of the dictionary alphabetically, reviewing it entry by entry and sense by sense, suggesting new senses and entries as the work proceeds. Once the end of the alphabet is reached, a new edition of the RID is prepared for publication.

== Editions ==
=== 1950 edition ===
RID 1950, first printing (1950).

The 1950 edition of the RID was first published in 1950. Although it is the first dictionary published by the RIT, it is a revision of an earlier dictionary published by the Thai government in 1927.

Work commenced on what would become RID 1950 in 1932, when the duty of producing the official governmental dictionary still belonged to the Ministry of Education, then known as the Department of Education (กรมธรรมการ). This task was transferred to the RIT in 1934, although the actual commission carried on as before, both in membership and methodology. From start to finish, the first meeting of the DRC was held on 5 October 1932, and the commission met for the final time before publication on March 8, 1950, having convened a total of 1,299 meetings over the course of over seventeen years. Meetings were held only once weekly until 1942, after which the commission met two days per week. In 1949, as the dictionary neared completion, the commission met three times per week. The original commission consisted of seven members in 1932, and at publication in 1950 had fifteen members. Two of the original seven members, as well as one later member, died before the work of revision was completed.

The RID 1950 remained the standard dictionary of Thai for more than 30 years, with 20 printings totalling 187,000 copies.

=== 1982 edition ===
The 1982 edition of the RID was first published in 1982, in commemoration of the 200th anniversary of the establishment of Bangkok as the capital of Thailand by King Rama I.

In 1976, prime minister Tanin Kraivixien ordered a revision of RID 1950, as part of an increased effort to promote knowledge of the standard language among Thai citizens. His charge included the task of updating the dictionary to include new words that had become standard, particularly terms coined by the RIT that had gained widespread use, as well as to include in this revised dictionary those words which were overlooked or otherwise omitted in the previous edition. The motion to have the RIT finally produce an "unabridged dictionary" was presented by Tanin at the cabinet meeting of 28 December 1976 and was accepted. Work was officially ordered the following day, with the charge to complete the new dictionary within one year.

At the end of the first year, the DRC requested an extension of another year, citing great interest from both other government bodies as well as the general public, so as to be able to process the many requests and suggestions received. After the second year had passed, a seven-month extension was requested and granted, followed by a three-month request, after which the revision was completed. In total, the commission met 280 times, first on 22 February 1977, and finally on 27 December 1979.

The RID 1982 remained the standard dictionary of Thai for more than 20 years, with six printings totalling 280,000 copies.

In 1996, in collaboration with National Electronics and Computer Technology Center (NECTEC), the RID 1982 was also produced in a limited edition CD-ROM version to celebrate the 50th anniversary of the reign of King Bhumibol Adulyadej. Twelve-thousand discs were made, of which 8,000 were distributed to educational institutions throughout the country, and the remainder were given away to interested persons upon request.

The sixth and final printing of 60,000 copies in 1996 was expected to be sufficient until the completion of RID 1999, but as it proved not to be, and with the supply of the CD-ROM edition similarly exhausted, the RIT decided to meet the demand by creating an internet edition of the RID 1982. It was online from 1996 until 2007, when it was supplanted by an online version of RID 1999.

=== 1999 edition ===
The 1999 edition of the RID was first published in 2003. It is called the 1999 edition to commemorate the sixth cycle (72nd) birthday anniversary of King Bhumibol Adulyadej in that year.

The RID 1999 had been the standard dictionary of Thai language until 2012. It had been printed just once in a massive run of 200,000 copies.

In mid-2007, the RIT made the RID 1999 available online.

=== 2011 edition ===
RID 2011, first printing (2013, for-distribution-only version)

==== Publication ====
On 5 April 5, 2012, RIT secretary general Kanokwalee Chuchaiya announced that the RIT had completed the revision of the 1999 edition, and that Yingluck Shinawatra's cabinet had endorsed budgets for the publication of the new edition in a massive run of 200,000 copies. The printing of the first 100,000 copies was completed at the end of 2012 and these copies were distributed to government agencies and educational institutions only. The other 100,000 copies were published for sales.

Apart from the revised words, this new edition contains hundreds of new words having been in regular use following the publication of the previous edition, including legal terms, political terms, names of plants, animals, sweets, colloquialisms, and slang.

Although the edition was actually released in 2012, it is called the 2011 edition to commemorate King Bhumibol Adulyadej's seventh cycle (84th) birthday anniversary in 2011. On 27 May 2013, Yingluck Shinawatra announced repealing the 1999 edition and replacing it with the 2011 edition. The announcement was published in the Government Gazette on 13 July 2013.

Since 24 October 2014, an online version of the 2011 edition has been made available for testing.
