= List of Jatakas =

List of Jataka tales mentioned in Buddhist literature or mythology

The Jataka tales are a voluminous body of literature concerning the stories of previous births of Gautama Buddha. Following is the list of Jataka tales mentioned in Buddhist literature or mythology. The tales are dated between 300 BC and 400 AD.

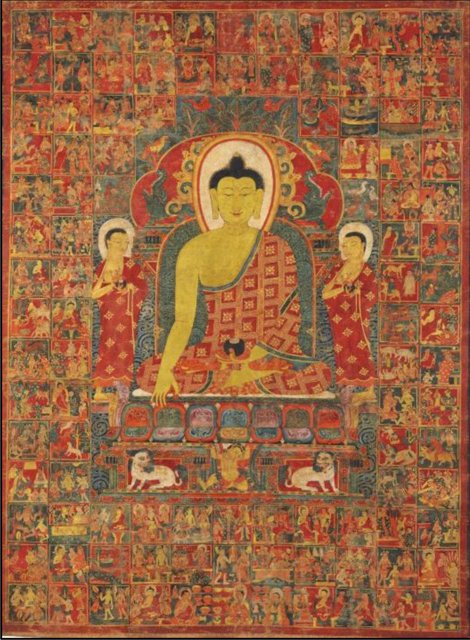
Thangka of Buddha with the One Hundred Jataka Tales in the background, Tibet, 13th-14th century.

== In Pali Canon ==
The Jātakas are found as a textual division of the Pāli Canon called Jātakapāḷi, included in the Khuddaka Nikaya of the Sutta Pitaka.

- 1. Apannaka Jataka
- 2. Vannupatha Jataka
- 3. Serivanija Jataka
- 4. Cullaka-Setthi Jataka
- 5. Tandulanali Jataka
- 6. Devadhamma Jataka
- 7. Katthahari Jataka
- 8. Gamani Jataka
- 9. Makhadeva Jataka
- 10. Sukhavihari Jataka
- 11. Lakkhana Jataka
- 12. Nigrodhamiga Jataka
- 13. Kandina Jataka
- 14. Vatamiga Jataka
- 15. Kharadiya Jataka
- 16. Tipallattha-Miga Jataka
- 17. Maluta Jataka
- 18. Matakabhatta Jataka
- 19. Ayacitabhatta Jataka
- 20. Nalapana Jataka
- 21. Kurunga Jataka
- 22. Kukkura Jataka
- 23. Bhojajaniya Jataka
- 24. Ajanna Jataka
- 25. Tittha Jataka
- 26. Mahilamukha Jataka
- 27. Abhinha Jataka
- 28. Nandivisala Jataka
- 29. Kanha Jataka
- 30. Munika Jataka
- 31. Kulavaka Jataka
- 32. Nacca Jataka
- 33. Sammodamana Jataka
- 34. Maccha Jataka
- 35. Vattaka Jataka
- 36. Sakuna Jataka
- 37. Tittira Jataka
- 38. Baka Jataka
- 39. Nanda Jataka
- 40. Khadirangara Jataka
- 41. Losaka Jataka
- 42. Kapota Jataka
- 43. Veluka Jataka
- 44. Makasa Jataka
- 45. Rohini Jataka
- 46. Aramadusaka Jataka
- 47. Varuni Jataka
- 48. Vedabbha Jataka
- 49. Nakkhatta Jataka
- 50. Dummedha Jataka
- 51. Mahasilava Jataka
- 52. Cula-Janaka Jataka
- 53. Punnapati Jataka
- 54. Phala Jataka
- 55. Pancavudha Jataka
- 56. Kancanakkhandha Jataka
- 57. Vanarinda Jataka
- 58. Tayodhamma Jataka
- 59. Bherivada Jataka
- 60. Samkhadhamana Jataka
- 61. Asatamanta Jataka
- 62. Andabhuta Jataka
- 63. Takka Jataka
- 64. Durajana Jataka
- 65. Anabhirati Jataka
- 66. Mudulakkhana Jataka
- 67. Ucchanga Jataka
- 68. Saketa Jataka
- 69. Visavanta Jataka
- 70. Kuddala Jataka
- 71. Varana Jataka
- 72. Silavanaga Jataka
- 73. Saccamkira Jataka
- 74. Rukkhadhamma Jataka
- 75. Maccha Jataka
- 76. Asamkiya Jataka
- 77. Mahasupina Jataka
- 78. Illisa Jataka
- 79. Kharassara Jataka
- 80. Bhimasena Jataka
- 81. Surapana Jataka
- 82. Mittavinda Jataka
- 83. Kalakanni Jataka
- 84. Atthassadvara Jataka
- 85. Kimpakka Jataka
- 86. Silavimamsana Jataka
- 87. Mamgala Jataka
- 88. Sarambha Jataka
- 89. Kuhaka Jataka
- 90. Akatannu Jataka
- 91. Litta Jataka
- 92. Mahasara Jataka
- 93. Vissasabhojana Jataka
- 94. Lomahamsa Jataka
- 95. Mahasudassana Jataka
- 96. Telapatta Jataka
- 97. Namasiddhi Jataka
- 98. Kutavanija Jataka
- 99. Parosahassa Jataka
- 100. Asatarupa Jataka
- 101. Parosata Jataka
- 102. Pannika Jataka
- 103. Veri Jataka
- 104. Mittavinda Jataka
- 105. Dubbalakattha Jataka
- 106. Udancani Jataka
- 107. Salittaka Jataka
- 108. Bahiya Jataka
- 109. Kundakapuva Jataka
- 110. Sabbasamharaka-Panha Jataka
- 111. Gadrabha-Panha Jataka
- 112. Amaradevi-Panha Jataka
- 113. Sigala Jataka
- 114. Mitacinti Jataka
- 115. Anusasika Jataka
- 116. Dubbaca Jataka
- 117. Tittira Jataka
- 118. Vattaka Jataka
- 119. Akalaravi Jataka
- 120. Bandhanamokkha Jataka
- 121. Kusanali Jataka
- 122. Dummedha Jataka
- 123. Nangalisa Jataka
- 124. Amba Jataka
- 125. Katahaka Jataka
- 126. Asilakkhana Jataka
- 127. Kalanduka Jataka
- 128. Bilara Jataka
- 129. Aggika Jataka
- 130. Kosiya Jataka
- 131. Asampadana Jataka
- 132. Pancagaru Jataka
- 133. Ghatasana Jataka
- 134. Jhanasodhana Jataka
- 135. Candabha Jataka
- 136. Suvannahamsa Jataka
- 137. Babbu Jataka
- 138. Godha Jataka
- 139. Ubhatobhattha Jataka
- 140. Kaka Jataka
- 141. Godha Jataka
- 142. Sigala Jataka
- 143. Virocana Jataka
- 144. Nanguttha Jataka
- 145. Radha Jataka
- 146. Kaka Jataka
- 147. Puppharatta Jataka
- 148. Sigala Jataka
- 149. Ekapanna Jataka
- 150. Sanjiva Jataka
- 151. Rajovada Jataka
- 152. Sigala Jataka
- 153. Sukara Jataka
- 154. Uraga Jataka
- 155. Gagga Jataka
- 156. Alinacitta Jataka
- 157. Guna Jataka
- 158. Suhanu Jataka
- 159. Mora Jataka
- 160. Vinilaka Jataka
- 161. Indasamanagotta Jataka
- 162. Santhava Jataka
- 163. Susima Jataka
- 164. Gijjha Jataka
- 165. Nakula Jataka
- 166. Upasalha Jataka
- 167. Samiddhi Jataka
- 168. Sakunagghi Jataka
- 169. Araka Jataka
- 170. Kakantaka Jataka
- 171. Kalyana-Dhamma Jataka
- 172. Daddara Jataka
- 173. Makkata Jataka
- 174. Dubhiya-Makkata Jataka
- 175. Adiccupatthana Jataka
- 176. Kalaya-Mutthi Jataka
- 177. Tinduka Jataka
- 178. Kacchapa Jataka
- 179. Satadhamma Jataka
- 180. Duddada Jataka
- 181. Asadisa Jataka
- 182. Samgamavacara Jataka
- 183. Valodaka Jataka
- 184. Giridanta Jataka
- 185. Anabhirati Jataka
- 186. Dadhi-Vahana Jataka
- 187. Catumatta Jataka
- 188. Sihakotthuka Jataka
- 189. Sihacamma Jataka
- 190. Silanisamsa Jataka
- 191. Ruhaka Jataka
- 192. Siri-Kalakanni Jataka
- 193. Culla-Paduma Jataka
- 194. Manicora Jataka
- 195. Pabbatupatthara Jataka
- 196. Valahassa Jataka
- 197. Mittamitta Jataka
- 198. Radha Jataka
- 199. Gahapati Jataka
- 200. Sadhusila Jataka
- 201. Bandhanagara Jataka
- 202. Keli-Sila Jataka
- 203. Khandha-Vatta Jataka
- 204. Viraka Jataka
- 205. Gangeyya Jataka
- 206. Kurunga-Miga Jataka
- 207. Assaka Jataka
- 208. Sumsumara Jataka
- 209. Kakkara Jataka
- 210. Kandagalaka Jataka
- 211. Somadatta Jataka
- 212. Ucchittha-Bhatta Jataka
- 213. Bharu Jataka
- 214. Punna-Nadi Jataka
- 215. Kacchapa Jataka
- 216. Maccha Jataka
- 217. Seggu Jataka
- 218. Kuta-Vanija Jataka
- 219. Garahita Jataka
- 220. Dhammaddhaja Jataka
- 221. Kasava Jataka
- 222. Cula-Nandiya Jataka
- 223. Puta-Bhatta Jataka
- 224. Kumbhila Jataka
- 225. Khanti-Vannana Jataka
- 226. Kosiya Jataka
- 227. Gutha-Pana Jataka
- 228. Kamanita Jataka
- 229. Palayi Jataka
- 230. Dutiya-Palayi Jataka
- 231. Upahana Jataka
- 232. Vina-Thuna Jataka
- 233. Vikannaka Jataka
- 234. Asitabhu Jataka
- 235. Vaccha-Nakha Jataka
- 236. Baka Jataka
- 237. Saketa Jataka
- 238. Ekapada Jataka
- 239. Harita-Mata Jataka
- 240. Mahapingala Jataka
- 241. Sabbadatha Jataka
- 242. Sunakha Jataka
- 243. Guttila Jataka
- 244. Viticcha Jataka
- 245. Mula-Pariyaya Jataka
- 246. Telovada Jataka
- 247. Padanjali Jataka
- 248. Kimsukopama Jataka
- 249. Salaka Jataka
- 250. Kapi Jataka
- 251. Samkappa Jataka
- 252. Tila-Mutthi Jataka
- 253. Mani-Kantha Jataka
- 254. Kundaka-Kucchi-Sindhava Jataka
- 255. Suka Jataka
- 256. Jarudapana Jataka
- 257. Gamani-Canda Jataka
- 258. Mandhatu Jataka
- 259. Tirita-Vaccha Jataka
- 260. Duta Jataka
- 261. Paduma Jataka
- 262. Mudu-Pani Jataka
- 263. Culla-Palobhana Jataka
- 264. Maha-Panada Jataka
- 265. Khurappa Jataka
- 266. Vatagga-Sindhava Jataka
- 267. Kakkata Jataka
- 268. Arama-Dusa Jataka
- 269. Sujata Jataka
- 270. Uluka Jataka
- 271. Udapana-Dusaka Jataka
- 272. Vyaggha Jataka
- 273. Kacchapa Jataka
- 274. Lola Jataka
- 275. Rucira Jataka
- 276. Kurudhamma Jataka
- 277. Romaka Jataka
- 278. Mahisa Jataka
- 279. Satapatta Jataka
- 280. Puta-Dusaka Jataka
- 281. Abbhantara Jataka
- 282. Seyya Jataka
- 283. Vaddhaki-Sukara Jataka
- 284. Siri Jataka
- 285. Manisukara Jataka
- 286. Saluka Jataka
- 287. Labha-Garaha Jataka
- 288. Macch-Uddana Jataka
- 289. Nana-Cchanda Jataka
- 290. Sila-Vimamsa Jataka
- 291. Bhadra-Ghata Jataka
- 292. Supatta Jataka
- 293. Kaya-Vicchinda Jataka
- 294. Jambu-Khadaka Jataka
- 295. Anta Jataka
- 296. Samudda Jataka
- 297. Kama-Vilapa Jataka
- 298. Udumbara Jataka
- 299. Komaya-Putta Jataka
- 300. Vaka Jataka
- 301. Cullakalinga Jataka
- 302. Mahaassaroha Jataka
- 303. Ekaraja Jataka
- 304. Daddara Jataka
- 305. Silavimamsana Jataka
- 306. Sujata Jataka
- 307. Palasa Jataka
- 308. Javasakuna Jataka
- 309. Chavaka Jataka
- 310. Sayha Jataka
- 311. Pucimanda Jataka
- 312. Kassapamandiya Jataka
- 313. Khantivadi Jataka
- 314. Lohakumbhi Jataka
- 315. Mamsa Jataka
- 316. Sasa Jataka
- 317. Matarodana Jataka
- 318. Kanavera Jataka
- 319. Tittira Jataka
- 320. Succaja Jataka
- 321. Kutidusaka Jataka
- 322. Daddabha Jataka
- 323. Brahmadatta Jataka
- 324. Cammasataka Jataka
- 325. Godha Jataka
- 326. Kakkaru Jataka
- 327. Kakati Jataka
- 328. Ananusociya Jataka
- 329. Kalabahu Jataka
- 330. Silavimamsa Jataka
- 331. Kokalika Jataka
- 332. Rathalatthi Jataka
- 333. Godha Jataka
- 334. Rajovada Jataka
- 335. Jambuka Jataka
- 336. Brahachatta Jataka
- 337. Pitha Jataka
- 338. Thusa Jataka
- 339. Baveru Jataka
- 340. Visayha Jataka
- 341. Kandari Jataka
- 342. Vanara Jataka
- 343. Kuntani Jataka
- 344. Ambacora Jataka
- 345. Gajakumbha Jataka
- 346. Kesava Jataka
- 347. Ayakuta Jataka
- 348. Aranna Jataka
- 349. Sandhibheda Jataka
- 350. Devatapanha Jataka
- 351. Manikundala Jataka
- 352. Sujata Jataka
- 353. Dhonasakha Jataka
- 354. Uraga Jataka
- 355. Ghata Jataka
- 356. Karandiya Jataka
- 357. Latukika Jataka
- 358. Culladhammapala Jataka
- 359. Suvannamiga Jataka
- 360. Sussondi Jataka
- 361. Vannaroha Jataka
- 362. Silavimamsa Jataka
- 363. Hiri Jataka
- 364. Khajjopanaka Jataka
- 365. Ahigundika Jataka
- 366. Gumbiya Jataka
- 367. Saliya Jataka
- 368. Tacasara Jataka
- 369. Mittavinda Jataka
- 370. Palasa Jataka
- 371. Dighitikosala Jataka
- 372. Migapotaka Jataka
- 373. Musika Jataka
- 374. Culladhanuggaha Jataka
- 375. Kapota Jataka
- 376. Avariya Jataka
- 377. Setaketu Jataka
- 378. Darimukha Jataka
- 379. Neru Jataka
- 380. Asanka Jataka
- 381. Migalopa Jataka
- 382. Sirikalakanni Jataka
- 383. Kukkuta Jataka
- 384. Dhammaddhaja Jataka
- 385. Nandiyamiga Jataka
- 386. Kharaputta Jataka
- 387. Suci Jataka
- 388. Tundila Jataka
- 389. Suvannakakkata Jataka
- 390. Mayhaka Jataka
- 391. Dhajavihetha Jataka
- 392. Bhisapuppha Jataka
- 393. Vighasa Jataka
- 394. Vattaka Jataka
- 395. Kaka Jataka
- 396. Kukku Jataka
- 397. Manoja Jataka
- 398. Sutano Jataka
- 399. Gijjha Jataka
- 400. Dabbhapuppha Jataka
- 401. Dasannaka Jataka
- 402. Sattubhasta Jataka
- 403. Atthisena Jataka
- 404. Kapi Jataka
- 405. Baka-Brahma Jataka
- 406. Gandhara Jataka
- 407. Mahakapi Jataka
- 408. Kumbhakara Jataka
- 409. Dalhadhamma Jataka
- 410. Somadatta Jataka
- 411. Susima Jataka
- 412. Kotisimbali Jataka
- 413. Dhumakari Jataka
- 414. Jagara Jataka
- 415. Kummasapinda Jataka
- 416. Parantapa Jataka
- 417. Kaccani Jataka
- 418. Atthasadda Jataka
- 419. Sulasa Jataka
- 420. Sumangala Jataka
- 421. Gangamala Jataka
- 422. Cetiya Jataka
- 423. Indriya Jataka
- 424. Aditta Jataka
- 425. Atthana Jataka
- 426. Dipi Jataka
- 427. Gijjha Jataka
- 428. Kosambi Jataka
- 429. Mahasuka Jataka
- 430. Cullasuka Jataka
- 431. Harita Jataka
- 432. Padakusalamanava Jataka
- 433. Lomasakassapa Jataka
- 434. Cakkavaka Jataka
- 435. Haliddiraga Jataka
- 436. Samugga Jataka
- 437. Putimansa Jataka
- 438. Tittira Jataka
- 439. Catu-Dvara Jataka
- 440. Kanha Jataka
- 441. Catu-Posathika Jataka
- 442. Sankha Jataka
- 443. Culla-Bodhi Jataka
- 444. Kanhadipayana Jataka
- 445. Nigrodha Jataka
- 446. Takkala Jataka
- 447. Maha-Dhamma-Pala Jataka
- 448. Kukkuta Jataka
- 449. Matta-Kundali Jataka
- 450. Bilari-Kosiya Jataka
- 451. Cakka-Vaka Jataka
- 452. Bhuri-Panha Jataka
- 453. Maha-Mangala Jataka
- 454. Ghata Jataka
- 455. Mati-Posaka Jataka
- 456. Junha Jataka
- 457. Dhamma Jataka
- 458. Udaya Jataka
- 459. Paniya Jataka
- 460. Yuvanjaya Jataka
- 461. Dasaratha Jataka
- 462. Samvara Jataka
- 463. Supparaka Jataka
- 464. Culla-Kunala Jataka
- 465. Bhadda-Sala Jataka
- 466. Samudda-Vanija Jataka
- 467. Kama Jataka
- 468. Janasandha Jataka
- 469. Maha-Kanha Jataka
- 470. Kosiya Jataka
- 471. Mendaka Jataka
- 472. Maha-Paduma Jataka
- 473. Mittamitta Jataka
- 474. Amba Jataka
- 475. Phandana Jataka
- 476. Javana-Hamsa Jataka
- 477. Culla-Narada Jataka
- 478. Duta Jataka
- 479. Kalinga-Bodhi Jataka
- 480. Akitta Jataka
- 481. Takkariya Jataka
- 482. Ruru Jataka
- 483. Sarabha-Miga Jataka
- 484. Salikedara Jataka
- 485. Canda-Kinnara Jataka
- 486. Maha-Ukkusa Jataka
- 487. Uddalaka Jataka
- 488. Bhisa Jataka
- 489. Suruci Jataka
- 490. Panc-Uposatha Jataka
- 491. Maha-Mora Jataka
- 492. Taccha-Sukara Jataka
- 493. Maha-Vanija Jataka
- 494. Sadhina Jataka
- 495. Dasa-Brahmana Jataka
- 496. Bhikkha-Parampara Jataka
- 497. Matanga Jataka
- 498. Citta-Sambhuta Jataka
- 499. Sivi Jataka
- 500. Sirimanda Jataka
- 501. Rohanta-Miga Jataka
- 502. Hamsa Jataka
- 503. Sattigumba Jataka
- 504. Bhallatiya Jataka
- 505. Somanassa Jataka
- 506. Campeyya Jataka
- 507. Maha-Palobhana Jataka
- 508. Panca-Pandita Jataka
- 509. Hatthi-Pala Jataka
- 510. Ayoghara Jataka
- 511. Kimchanda Jataka
- 512. Kumbha Jataka
- 513. Jayaddisa Jataka
- 514. Chaddanta Jataka
- 515. Sambhava Jataka
- 516. Mahakapi Jataka
- 517. Dakarakkhasa Jataka
- 518. Pandara Jataka
- 519. Sambula Jataka
- 520. Gandatindu Jataka
- 521. Tesakuna Jataka
- 522. Sarabhanga Jataka
- 523. Aambusa Jataka
- 524. Samkhapala Jataka
- 525. Culla-Sutasoma Jataka
- 526. Nalinika Jataka
- 527. Ummadanti Jataka
- 528. Mahabodhi Jataka
- 529. Sonaka Jataka
- 530. Samkicca Jataka
- 531. Kusa Jataka
- 532. Sona-Nanda Jataka
- 533. Cullahamsa Jataka
- 534. Mahahamsa Jataka
- 535. Sudhabhojana Jataka
- 536. Kunala Jataka
- 537. Maha-Sutasoma Jataka
- 538. Muga-Pakkha Jataka
- 539. Mahajanaka Jataka
- 540. Sama Jataka
- 541. Nimi Jataka
- 542. Khandahala Jataka
- 543. Bhuridatta Jataka
- 544. Mahanaradakassapa Jataka
- 545. Vidhurapandita Jataka
- 546. Maha-Ummagga Jataka
- 547. Vessantara Jataka

== In Arya Śura's Jatakamala ==
The Jātaka-Mālā of Arya Śura in Sanskrit gives 34 Jātaka stories.

- 1 vyāghrī-jātakam
- 2 śibi-jātakam
- 3 kulmāṣapiṇḍī-jātakam
- 4 śreṣṭhi-jātakam
- 5 aviṣahyaśreṣṭhi-jātakam
- 6 śaśajātakam
- 7 agastya-jātakam
- 8 maitrībala-jātakam
- 9 viśvantara-jātakam
- 10 yajña-jātakam
- 11 śakra-jātakam
- 12 brāhmaṇa-jātakam
- 13 unmādayantī-jātakam
- 14 supāraga-jātakam
- 15 matsya-jātakam
- 16 vartakāpītaka-jātakam
- 17 kumbha-jātakam
- 18 aputra-jātakam
- 19 bisa-jātakam
- 20 śreṣṭhi-jātakam
- 21 cuḍḍabodhi-jātakam
- 22 haṁsa-jātakam
- 23 mahābodhi-jātakam
- 24 mahākapi-jātakam
- 25 śarabha-jātakam
- 26 ruru-jātakam
- 27 mahākapi-jātakam
- 28 kṣānti-jātakam
- 29 brahma-jātakam
- 30 hasti-jātakam
- 31 sutasoma-jātakam
- 32 ayogṛha-jātakam
- 33 mahiṣa-jātakam
- 34 śatapatra-jātakam

== Pannasa Jataka ==
The Paññāsa Jātaka is a non-canonical collection of 50 stories of the Buddha's past lives.

== In Mahavastu ==
The Mahāvastu is a Vinaya text of the Lokottaravāda school of Early Buddhism. Over half of the text is composed of Jātaka and Avadāna tales.

- Rakṣita jātakaṁ
- Hastināga jātakaṁ
- Ṛṣabhasya jātakaṁ
- Maṁjarījātakaṁ
- Śrīgodhājātakaṁ
- Śrīyaśodharāye hārapradānajātakaṁ
- Śrīyaśodharāye vyāghrībhūtāye jātakaṁ
- Śrīdharmapālasya jātakaṁ
- Śrīśarakṣepaṇaṁ jātakaṁ
- Amarāye karmāradhītāye jātakaṁ
- Śrīśirijātakaṁ
- Śrīkinnarījātakaṁ
- Śyāmāye jātakaṁ
- Śrīcampakanāgarājasya jātakaṁ
- Śyāmakajātakaṁ
- Śiriprabhasya mṛgarājasya jātakaṁ
- Śakuntakajātakaṁ
- Kacchapajātakaṁ
- Markaṭajātakaṁ
- Śakuntakajātakaṁ
- Surūpasya mṛgarājño jātakaṁ
- Anaṅgaṇa jātakaṁ
- Kuśajātakaṁ
- Vṛṣabhajātakaṁ
- Vānarajātakaṁ
- Vānarajātakaṁ
- Puṇyavantajātakaṁ
- Vijitāvisya vaideharājño jātakaṁ
- Śāriputramaudgalyāyanapramukhānāṁ paṁcānāṁ bhikṣuśatānāṁ rākṣasīdvīpakṣiptānāṁ jātakaṁ
- Kākajātakaṁ
- Hastinījātakaṁ
- Nalinīye rājakumārīye jātakaṁ
- Upāligaṁgapālānāṁ jātakaṁ
- Dharmalabdhasya sārthavāhasya jātakaṁ
- Ājñātakauṇḍinyasya jātakaṁ
- Paṁcakānāṁ bhadravargikānāṁ jātakaṁ
- Kṣāntivādin jātakaṁ
- Sarabhaṁjātakaṁ
- Yaśodajātakaṁ
- Asthisena jātakaṁ
- Āyuṣmantānāṁ uruvilvākāśyapanadīkāśyapagayākāśyapānāṁ jātakaṁ
- Arindamarājajātakaṁ

== Haribhatta's Jatakamala ==
Haribhatta's Jatakamala presents thirty-four accounts of the Buddha's past lives. Some of them are:

- Prabhāsa-jātaka
- Badaradvīpa-jātaka
- Dharmakāma-jātaka
- Śaśa-jātaka
- Candraprabha-jātaka
- Rūpyāvatī-jātaka
- Śreṣṭhi-jātaka
- Padmaka-jātaka
- Brahmadatta-jātaka
- Mṛga-jātaka
- Mayūra-jātaka
- Śyāma-jātaka
- Hasti-jātaka
- Candra-jātaka
- Mṛga-jātaka
- Kanakavarma-jātaka
- Mūlika-jātaka
- Kinnarīsudhana-jātaka
- Jājvali-jātaka
- Keśava-jātaka
- Nirupamā-jātaka
- Siṃha-jātaka
- Śakra-jātaka
- Śyenaka-jātaka

== Gallery ==
Here are images illustrating some of the scenes from the Jataka tales:

Click on images to enlarge

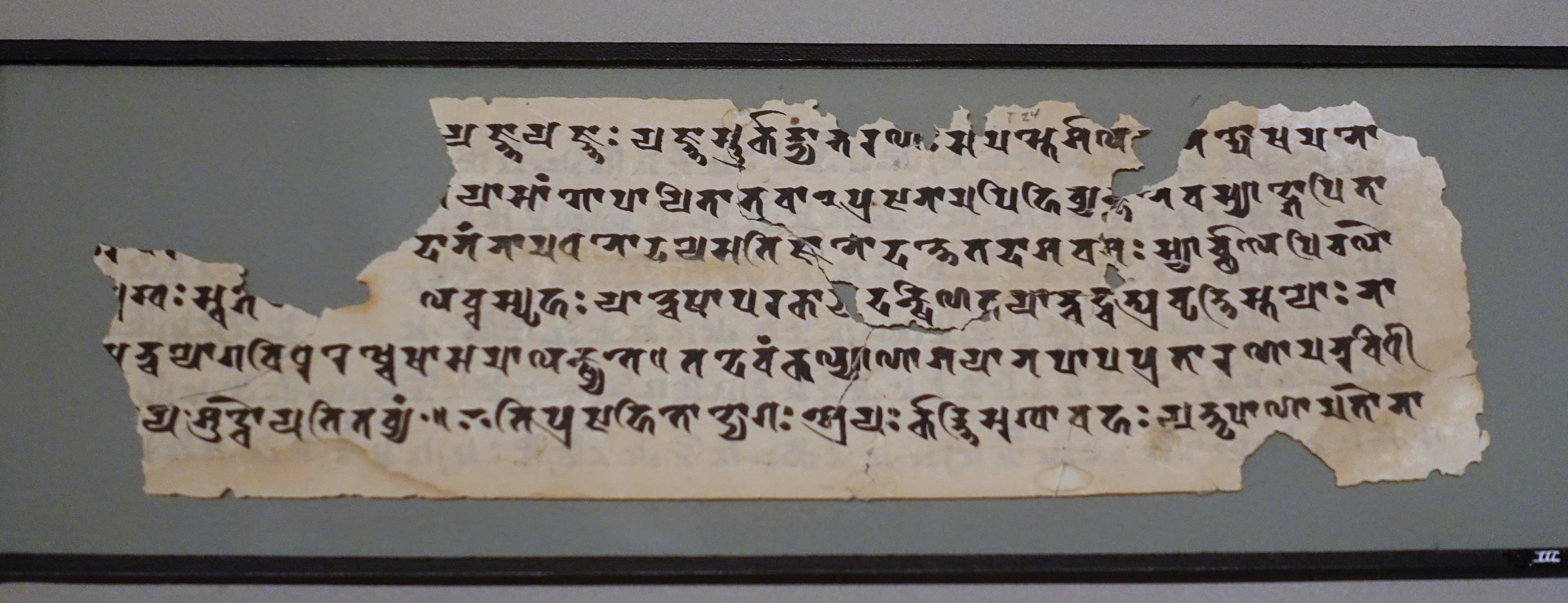
Jatakamala manuscript 8th-9th century.

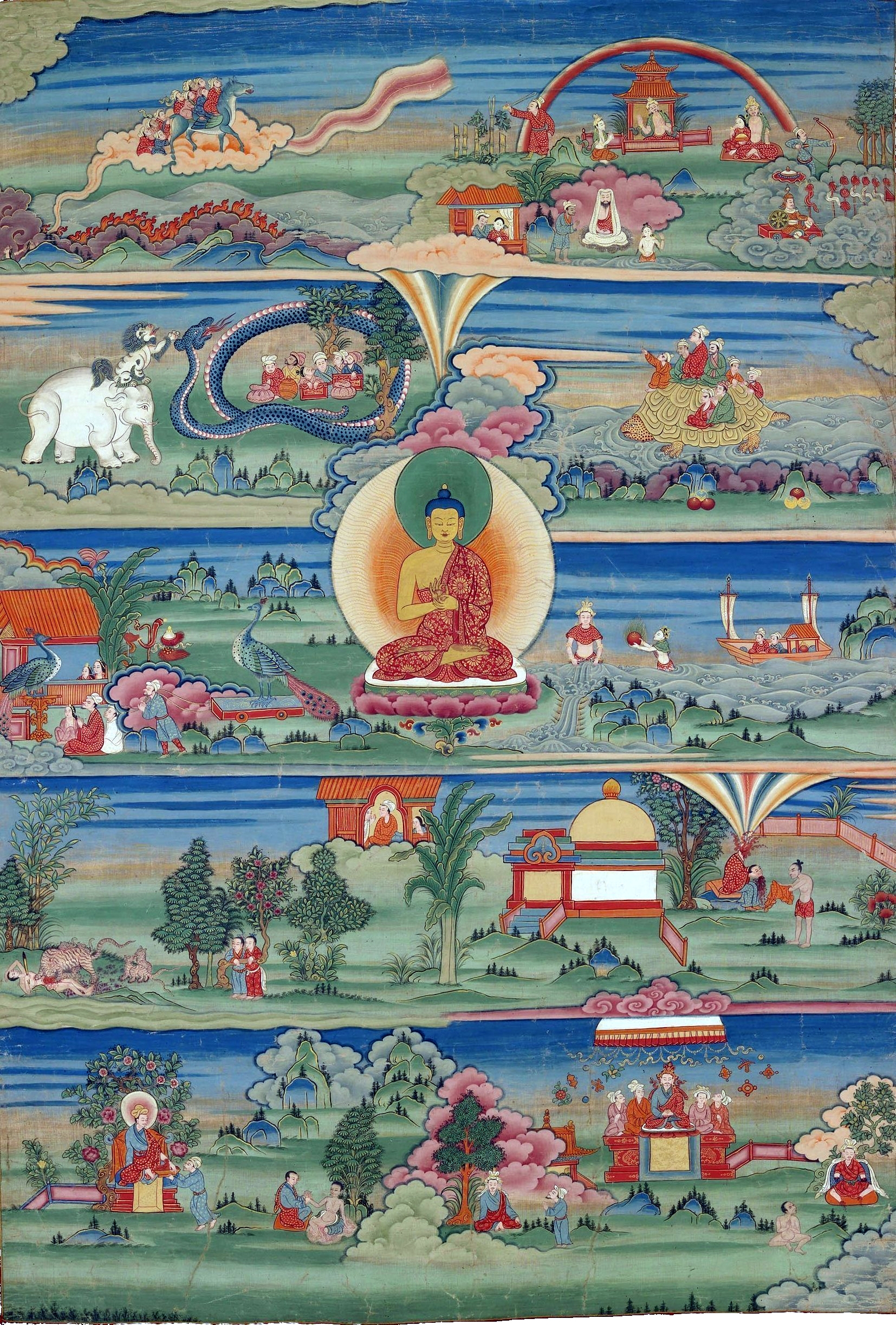
Bhutanese painted thangka of the Jātakas, 18th-19th Century, Phajoding Gonpa, Thimphu, Bhutan.

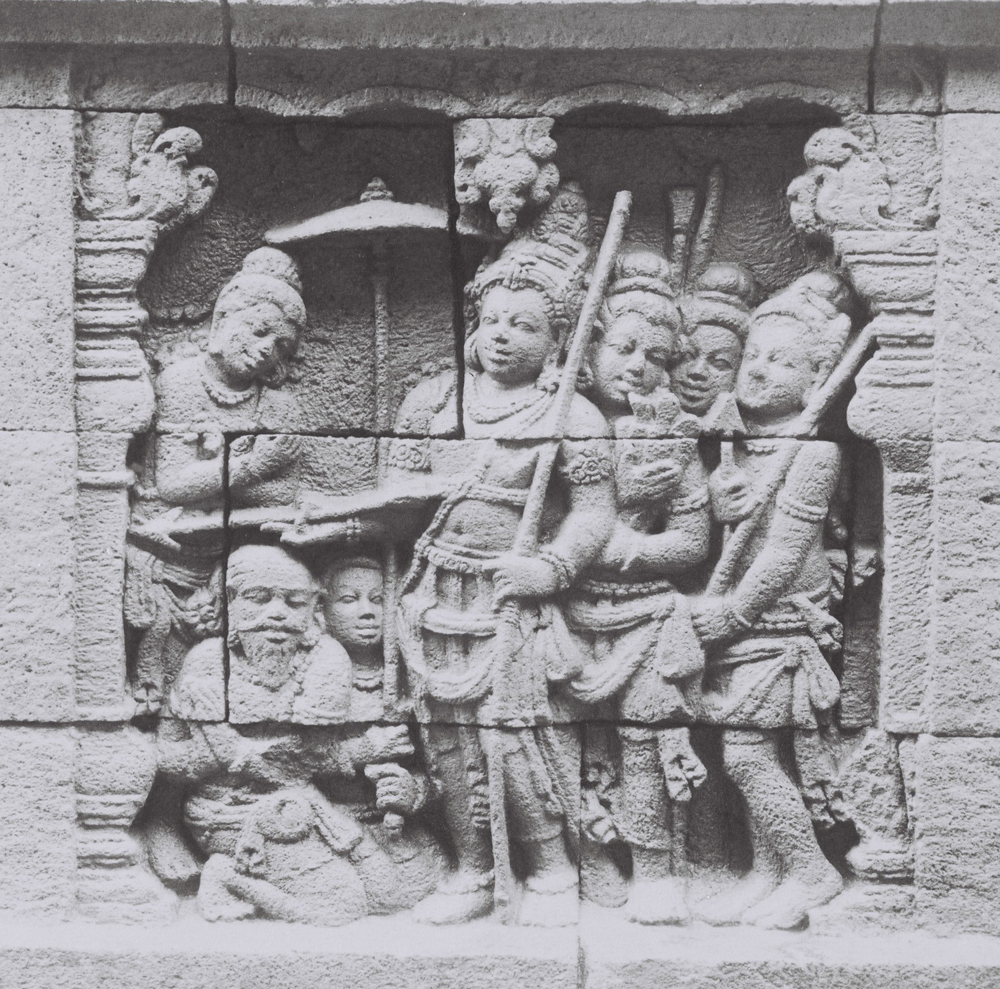
Scene from Khudda-bodhi-Jataka, Borobudur.

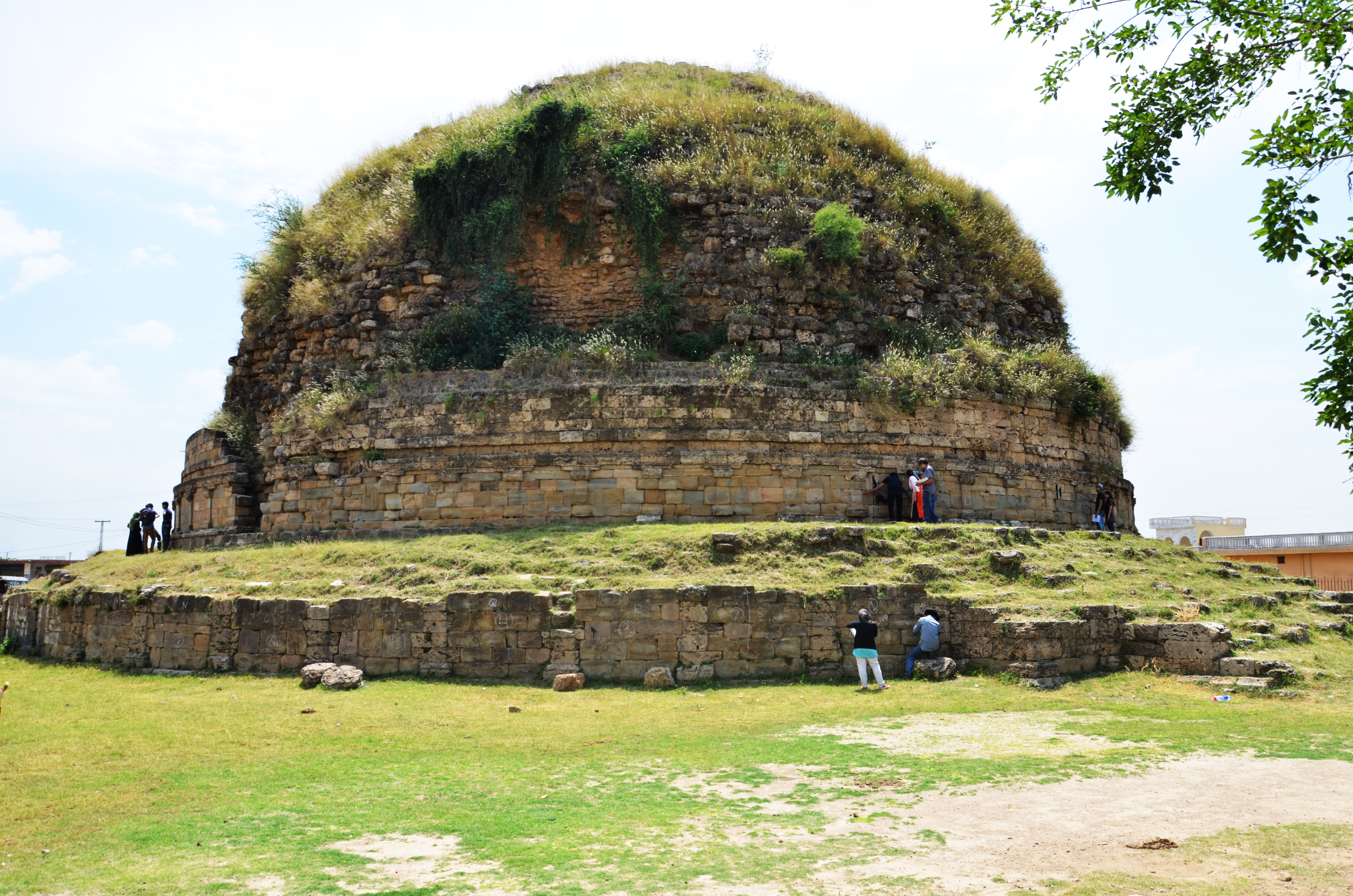
The Mankiala stupa in northern Pakistan marks the spot where, according to the Jataka, Siddhartha Gatama, during a past life sacrificed himself in order to feed tigers.

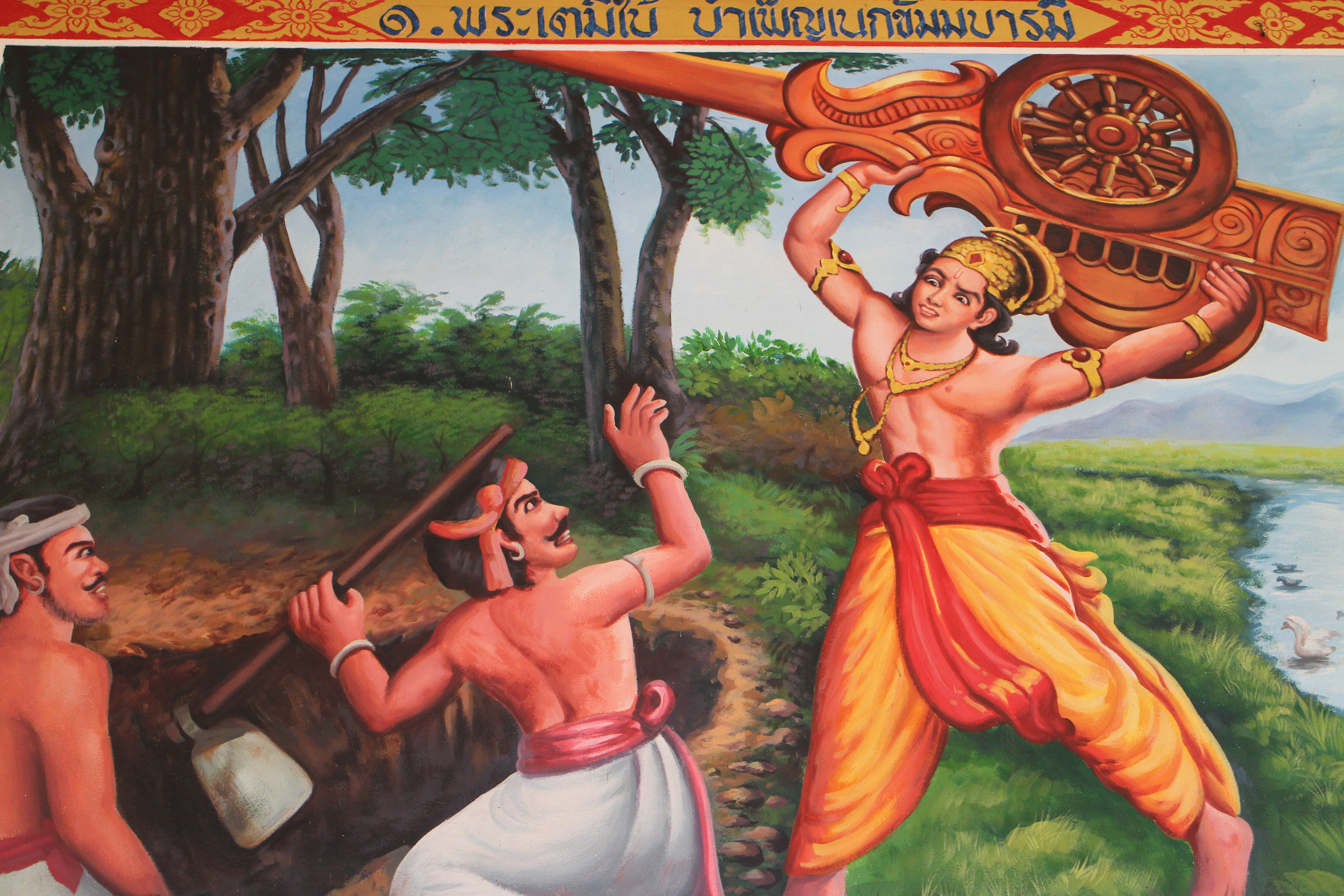
Scene from Muga-Pakkha Jataka.

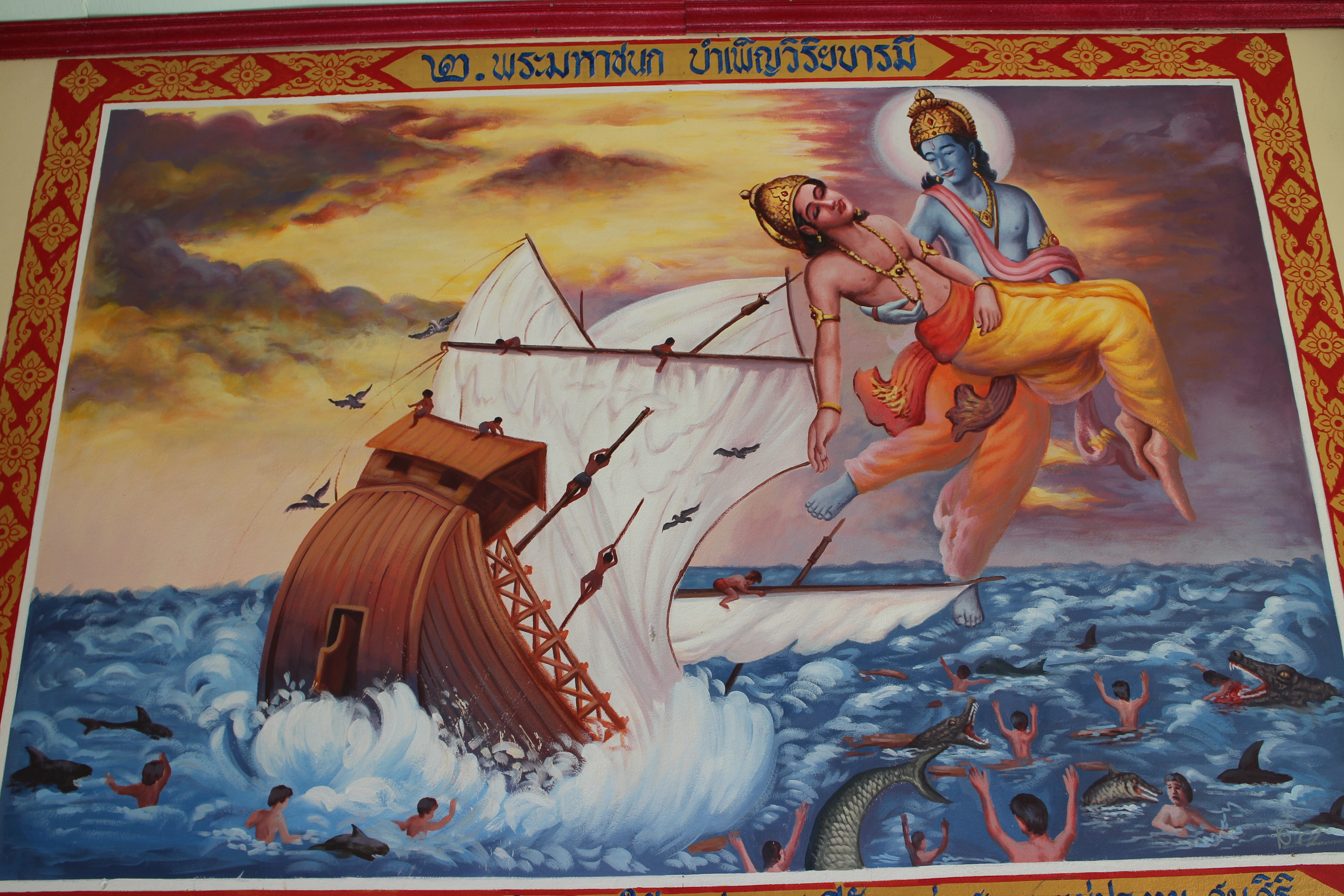
Scene from Mahajanaka Jataka.

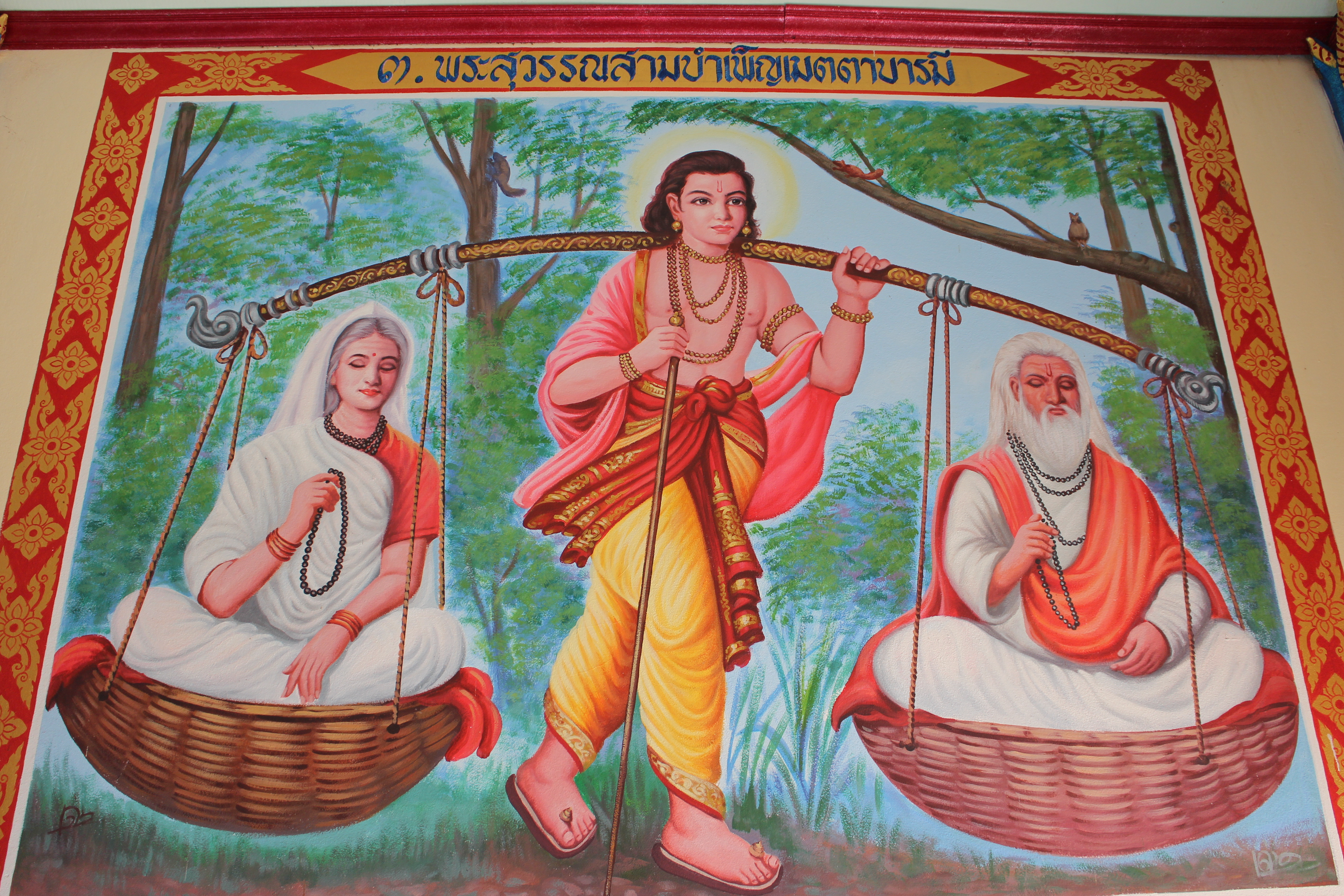
Scene from Sama Jataka (Syama Jataka)

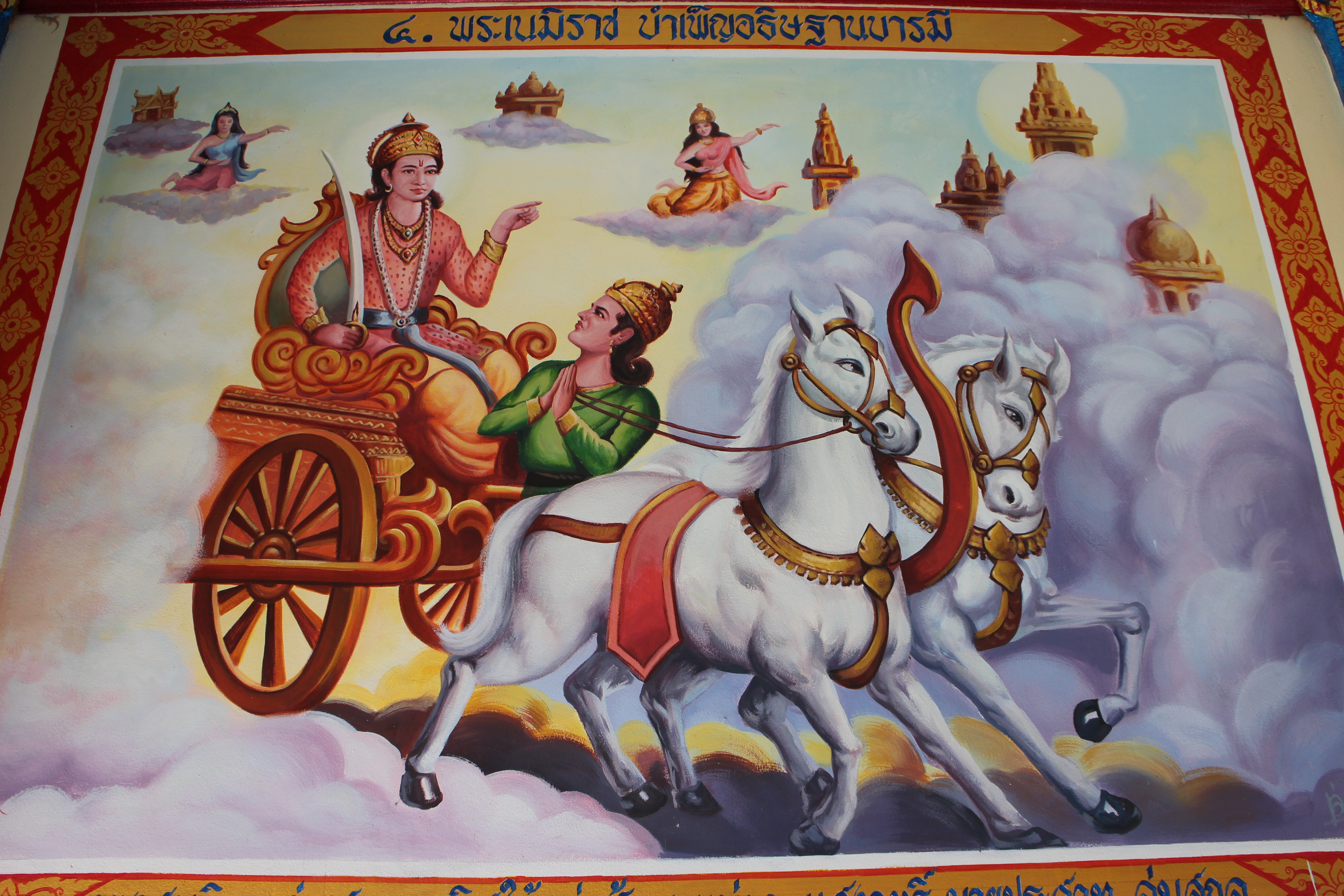
Scene from Nimi Jataka.

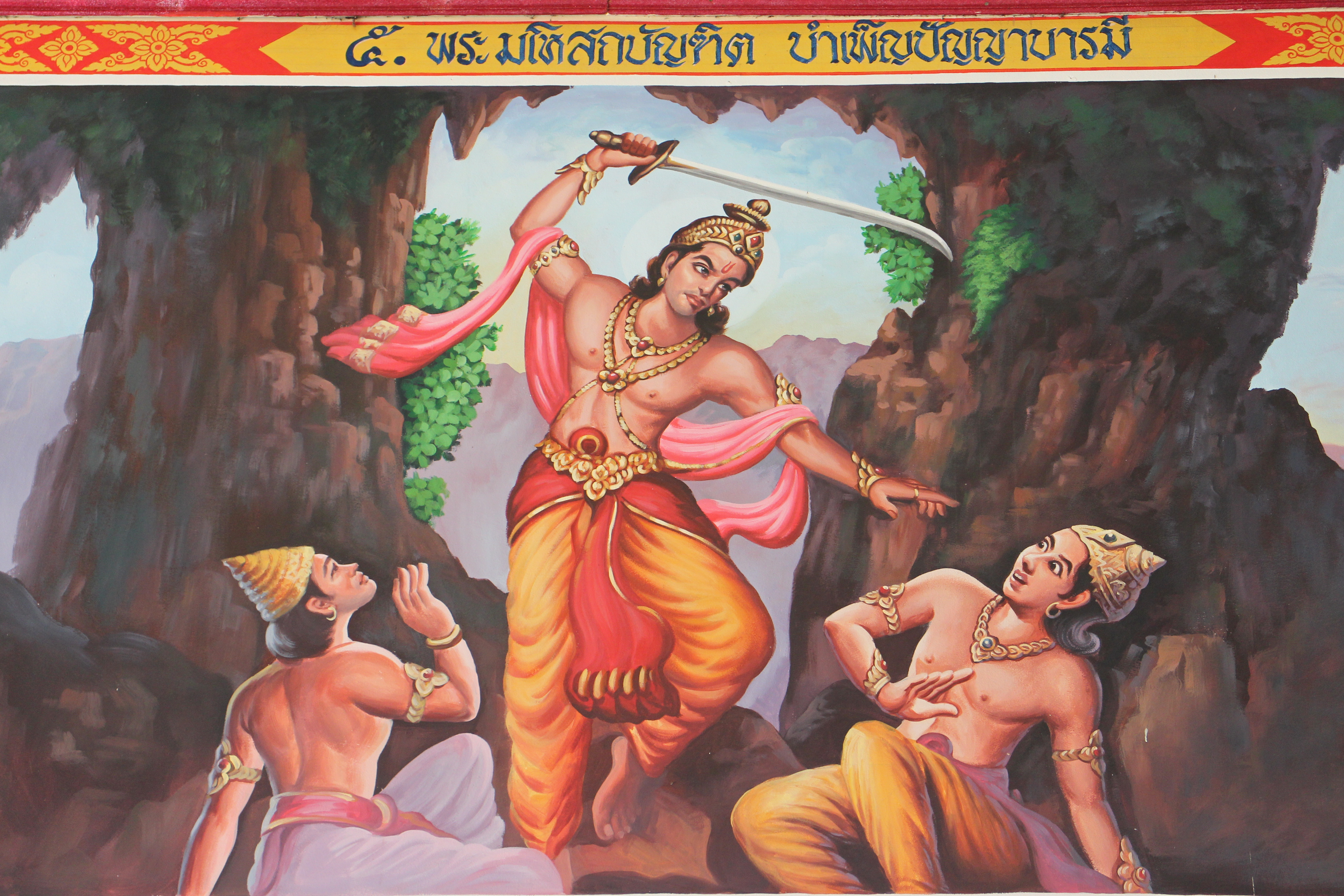
Scene from Maha-Umagga Jataka.

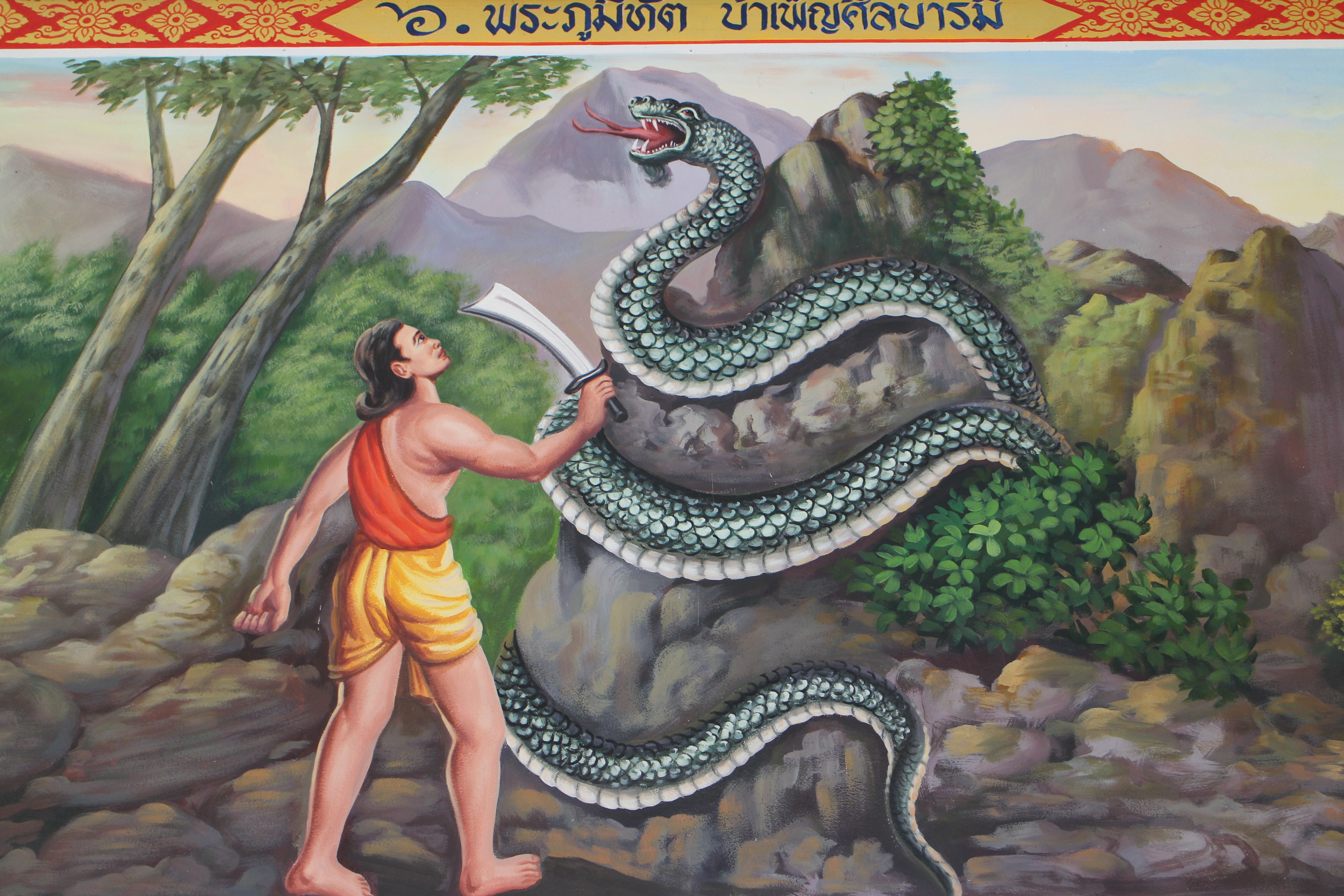
Scene from Bhuridatta Jataka.

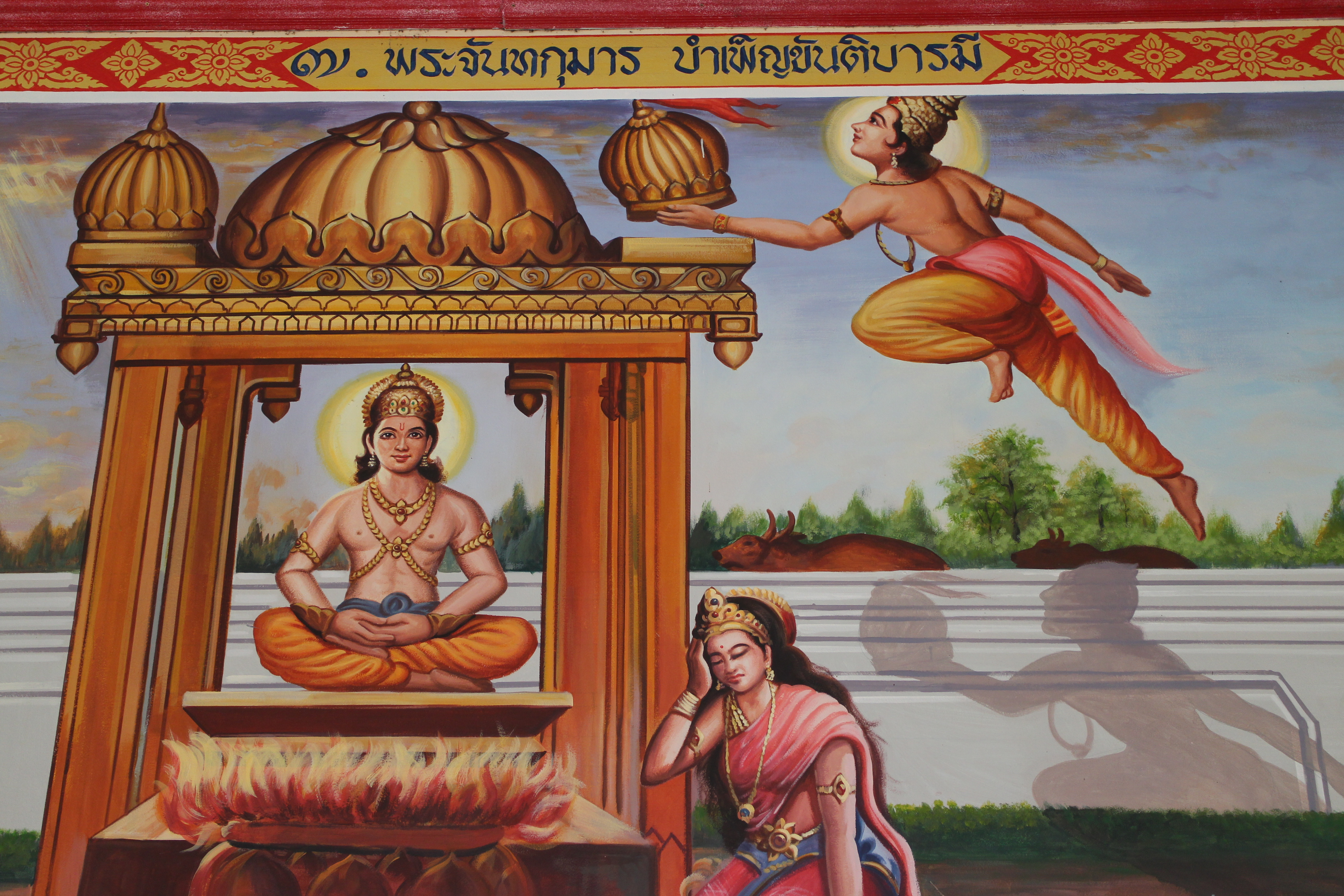
Scene from Khandahala Jataka.

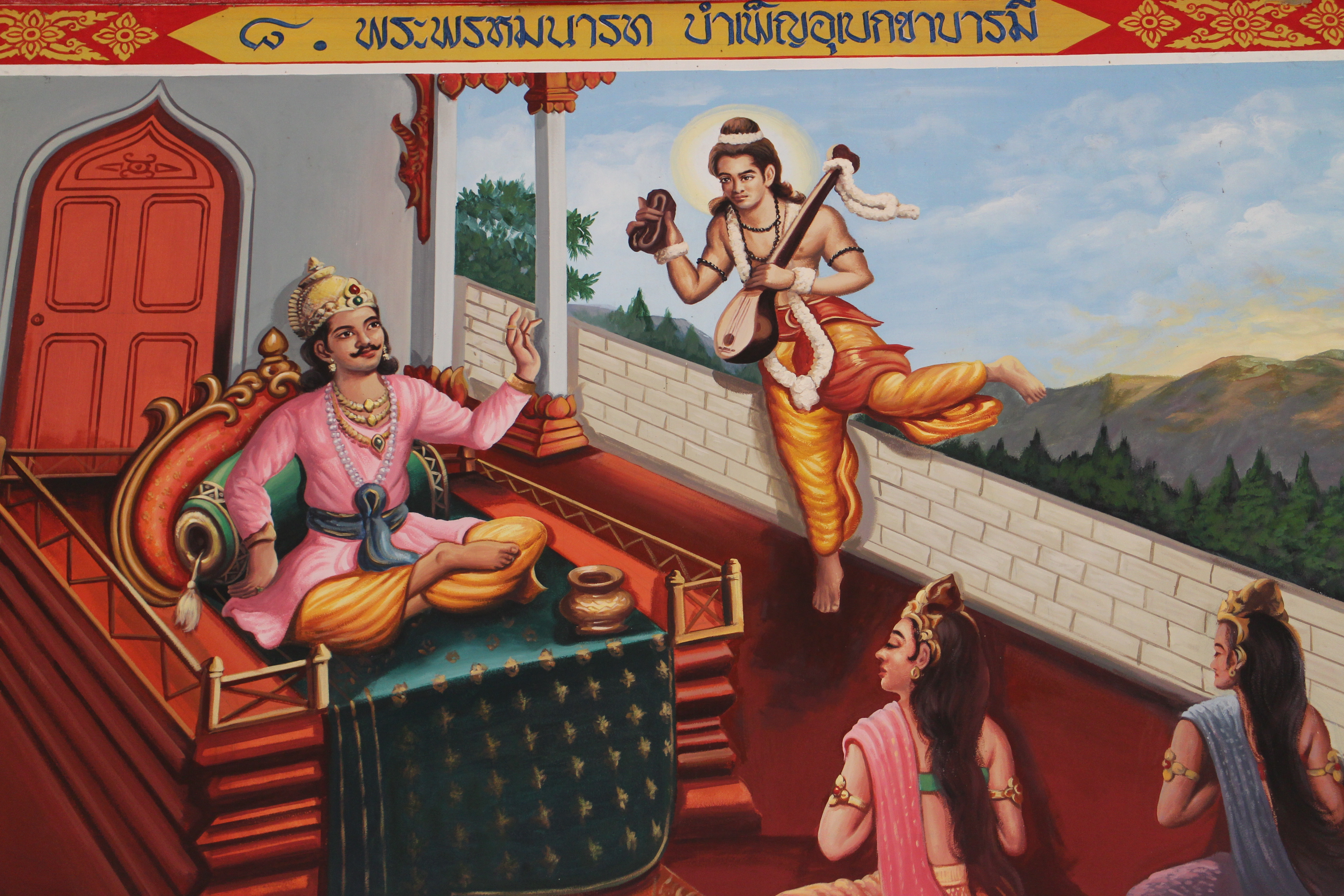
Scene from Maha-Narada Jataka.

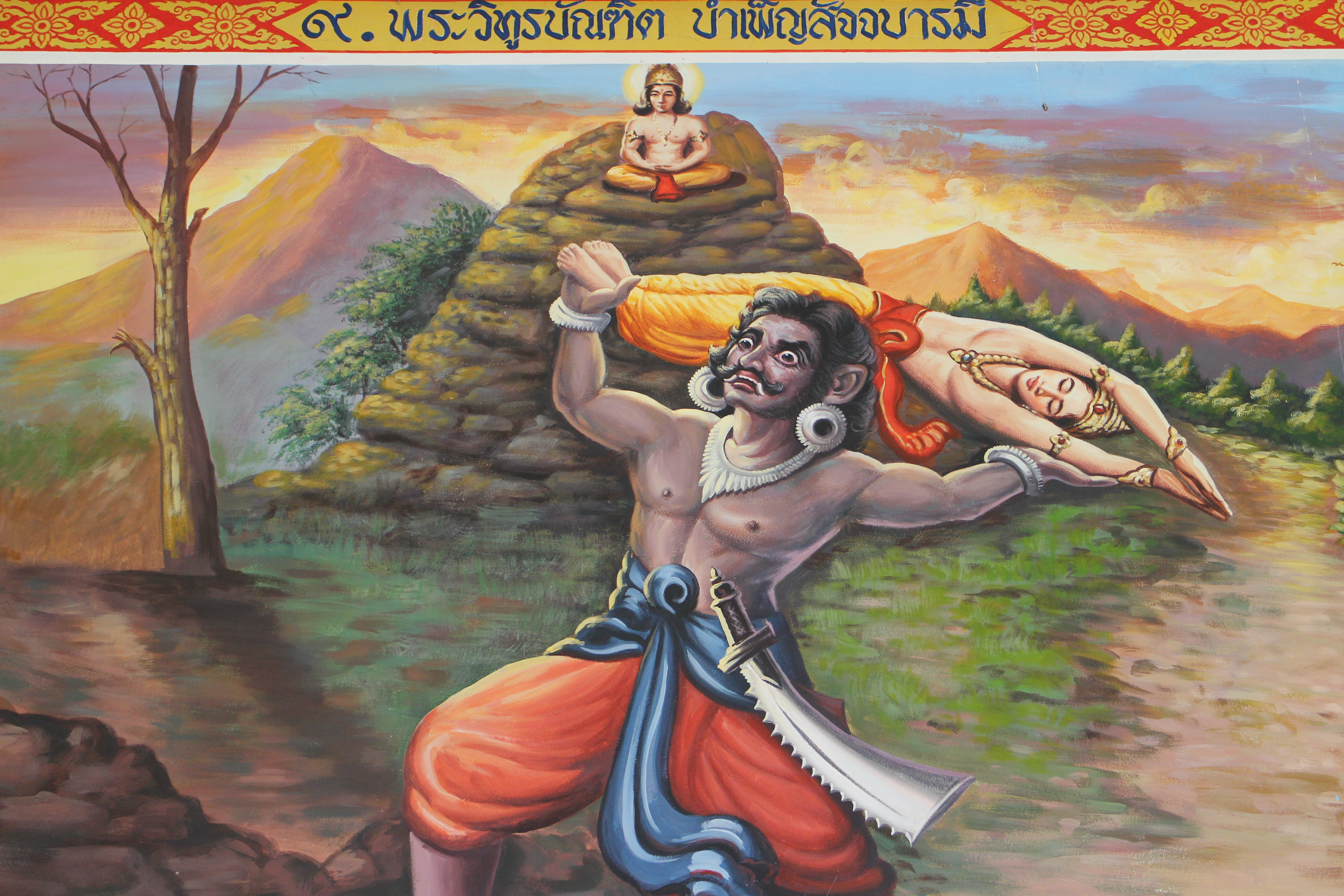
Scene from Vidhura-pandita Jataka.

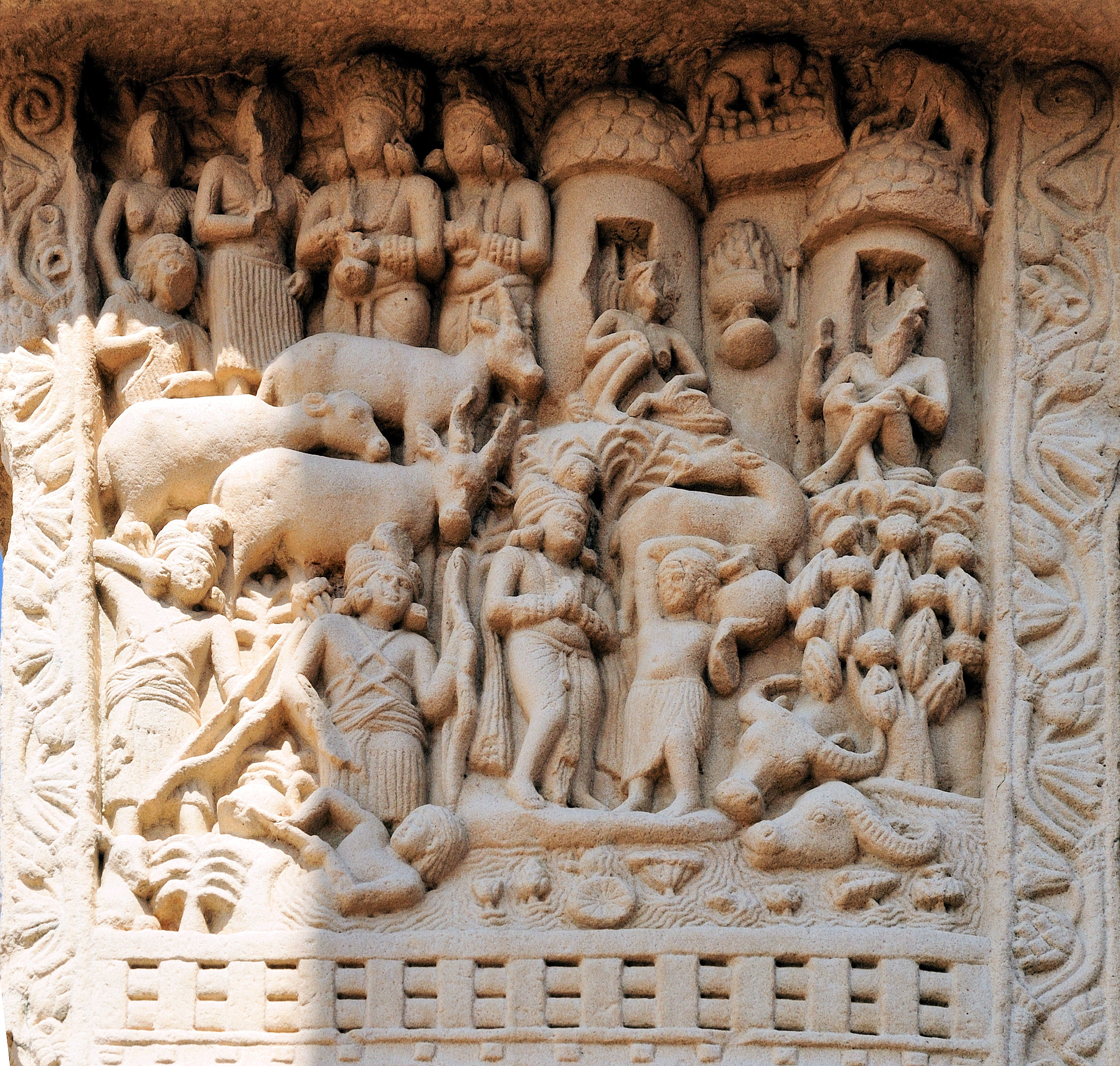
Scene from Syama Jataka, Sanchi Stupa 1 Western Gateway.

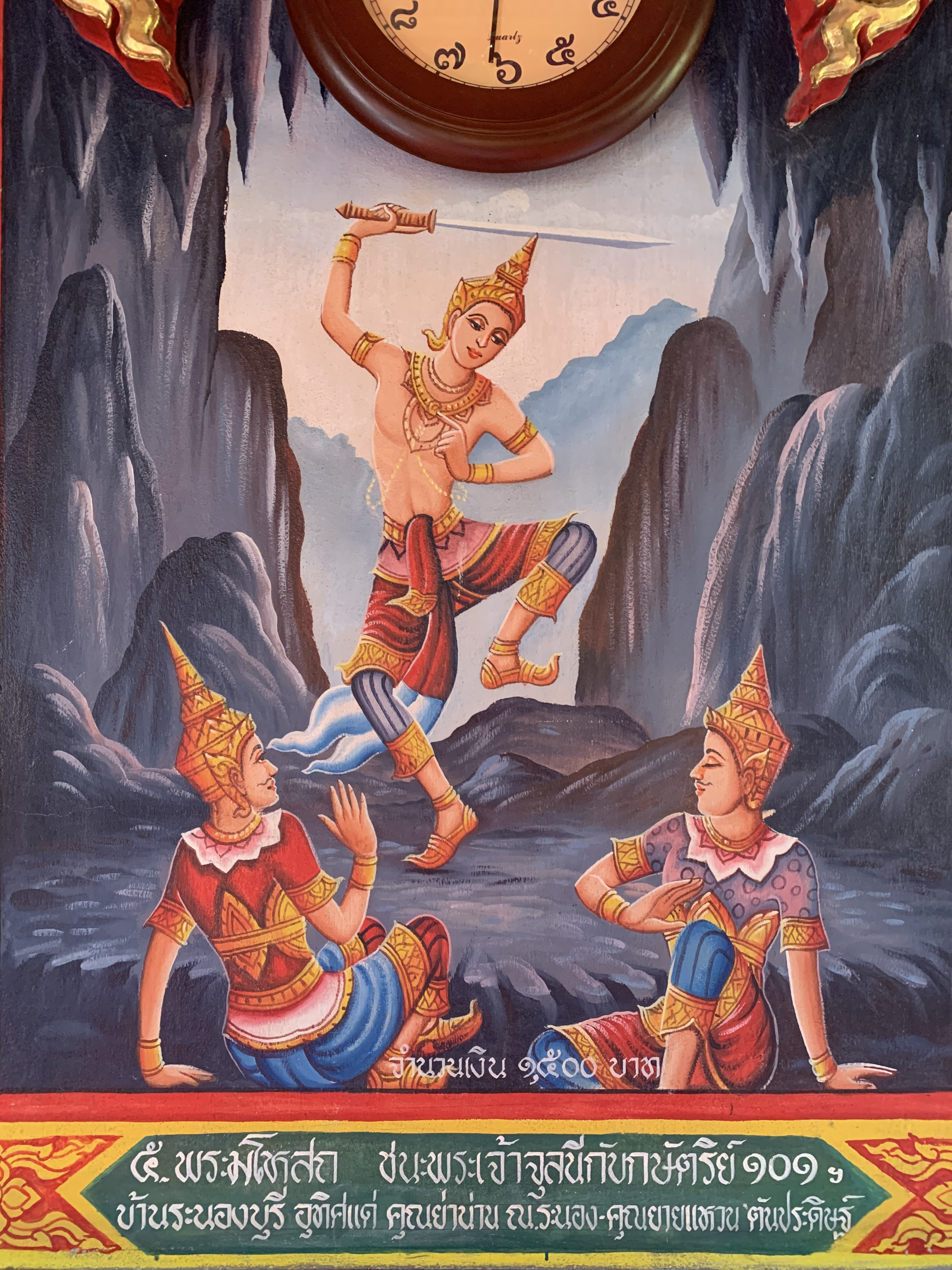
Scene from Mahosadh Jataka

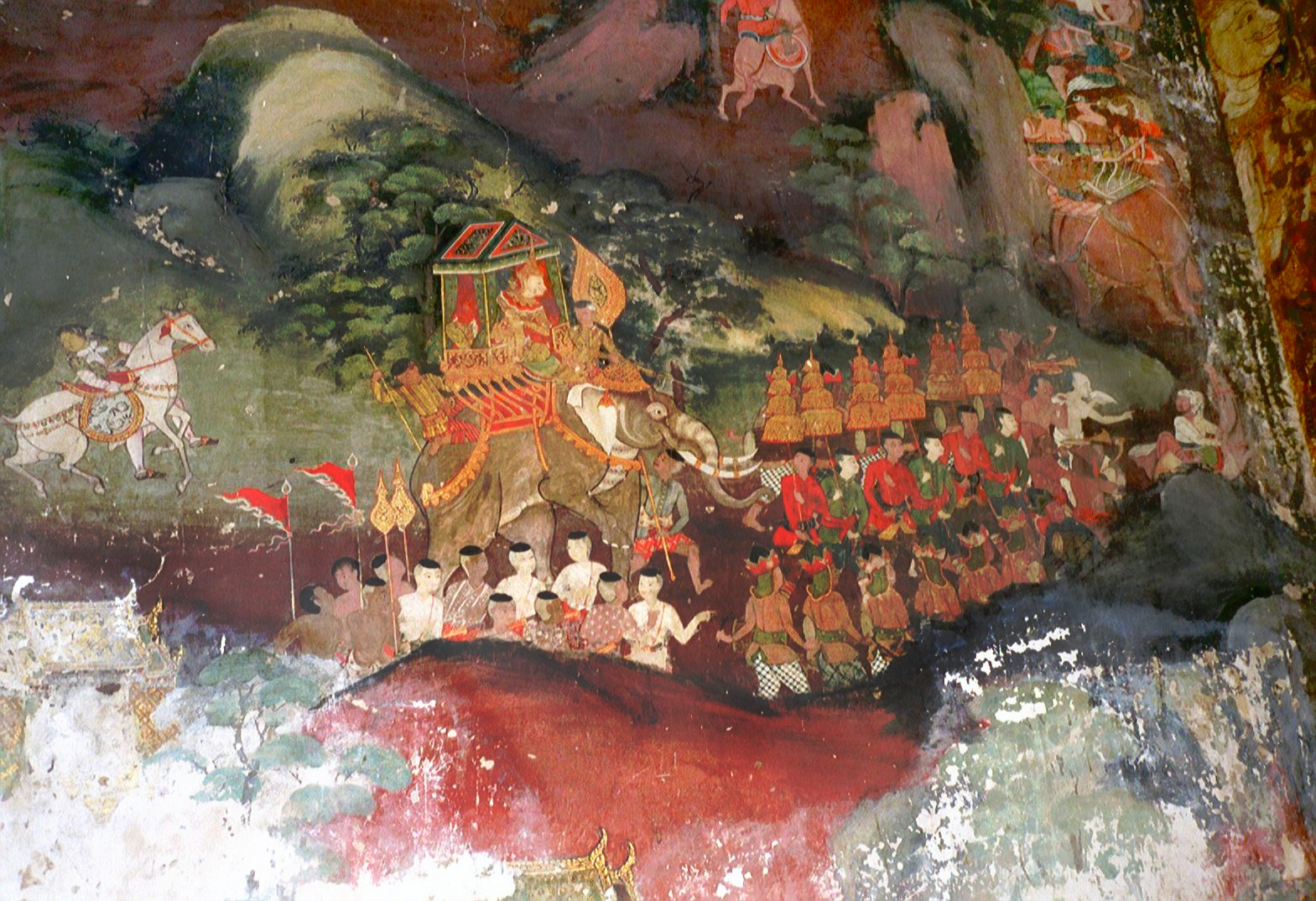
Vessantara Jataka mural, 19th century, Wat Suwannaram, Thonburi district, Bangkok, Thailand

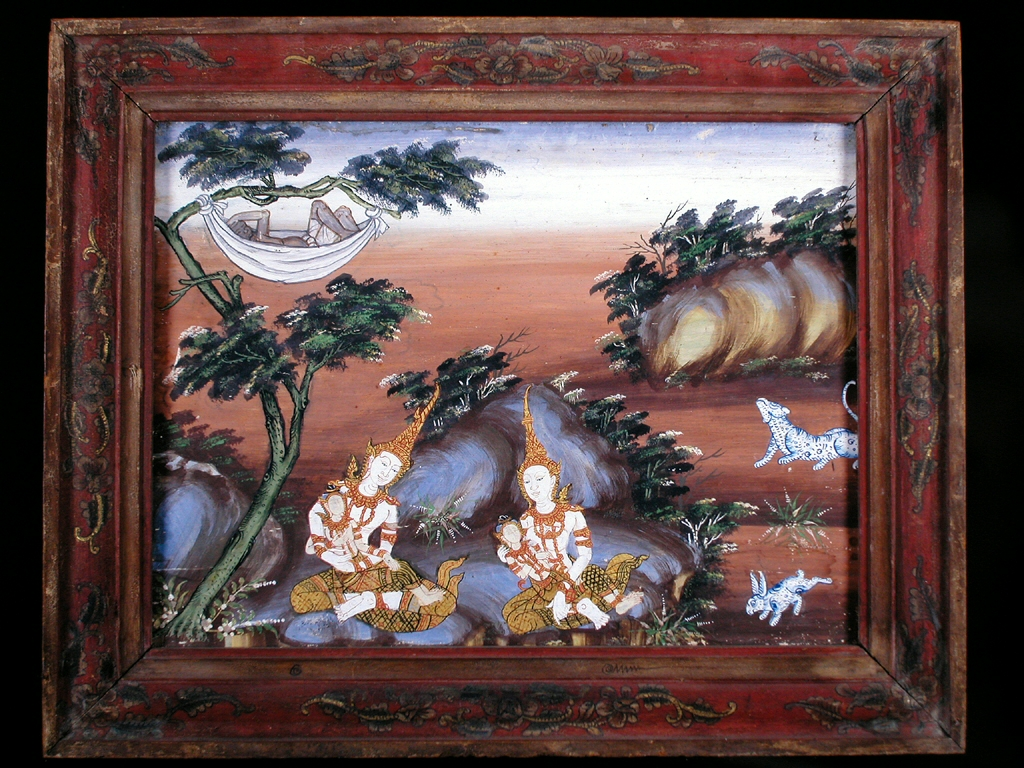
Vessantara Jataka painting from the 19th century, Thailand. In the collection of the Walters Art Museum.

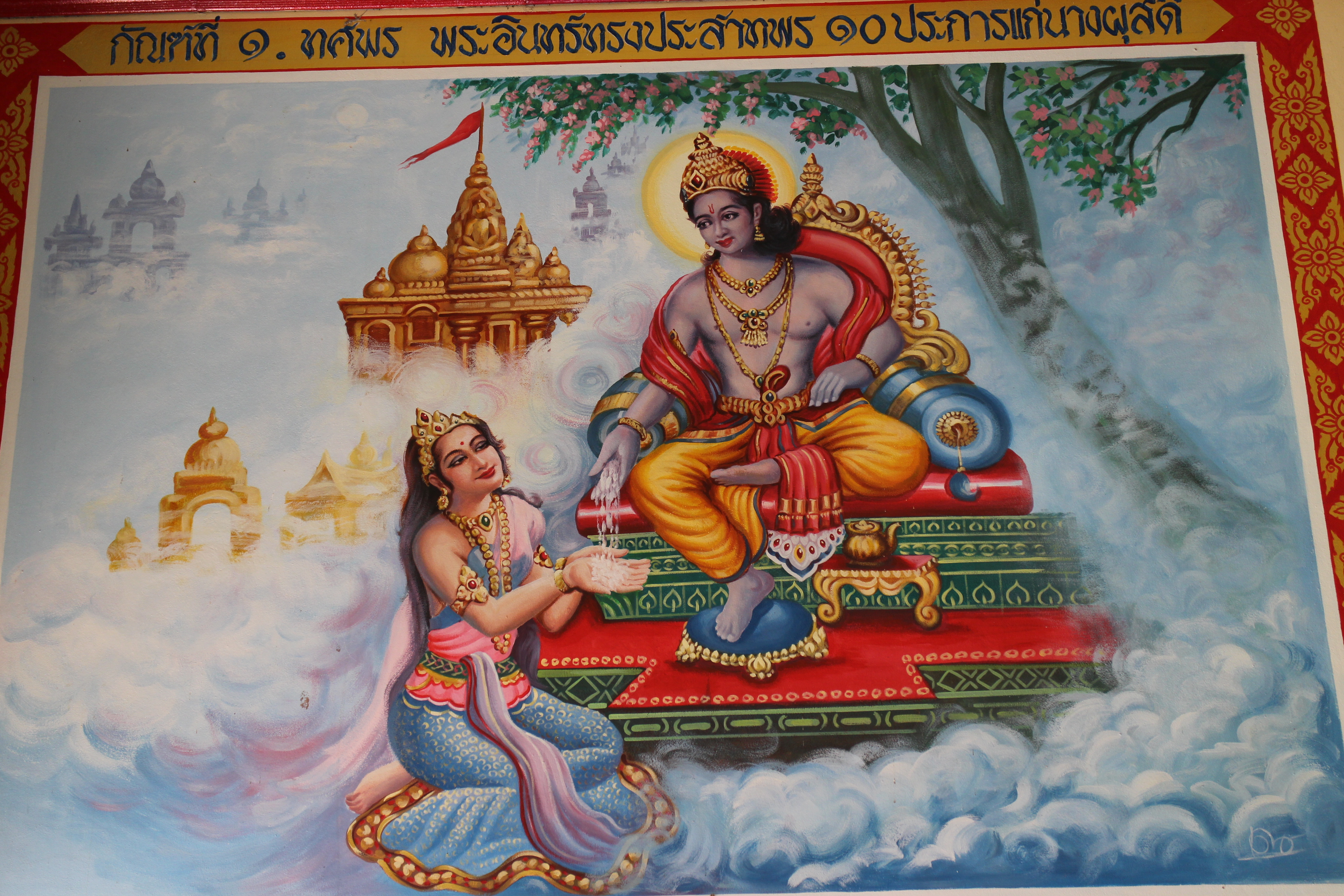
Scene from Vessantara Jataka.

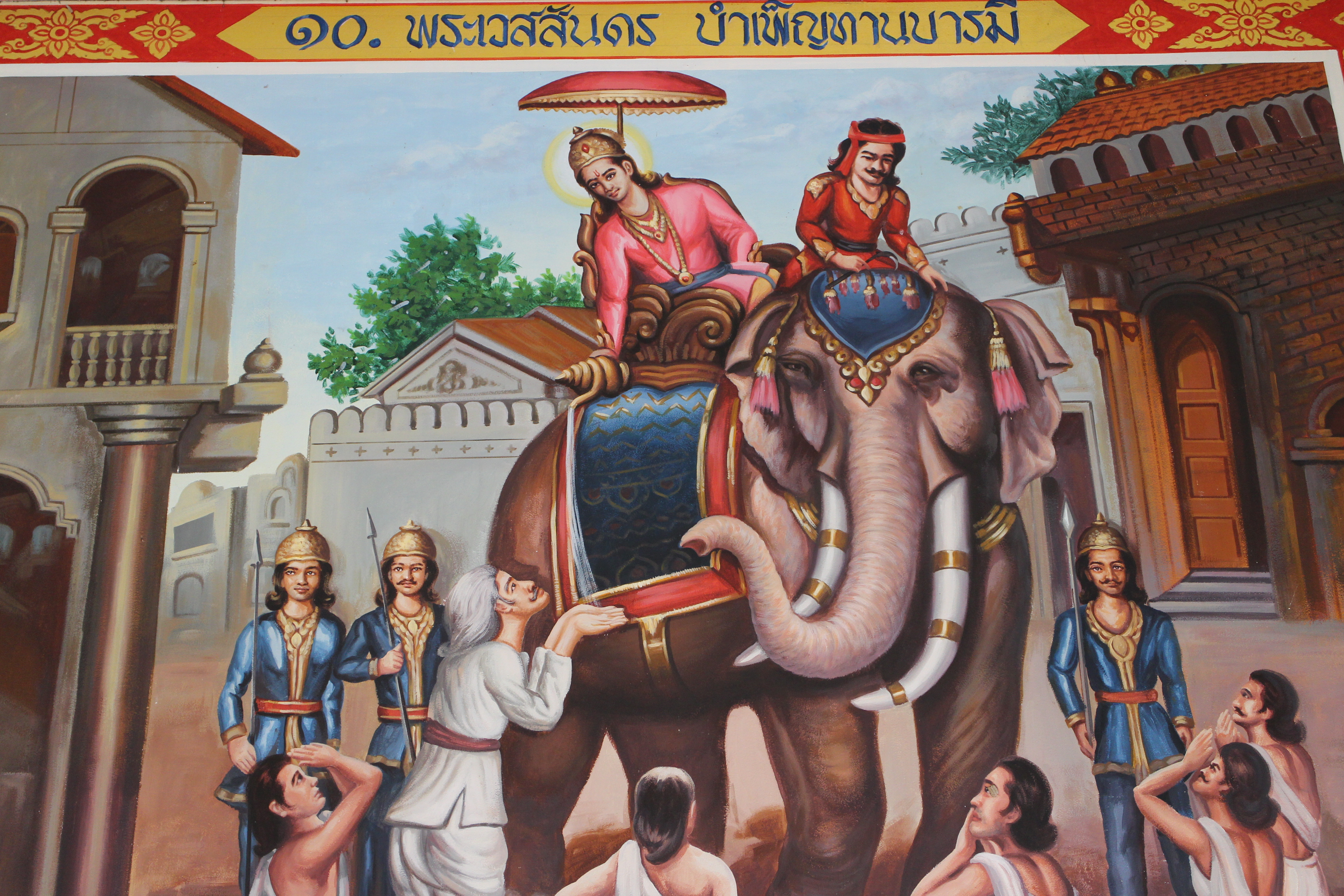
Scene from Vessantara Jataka.

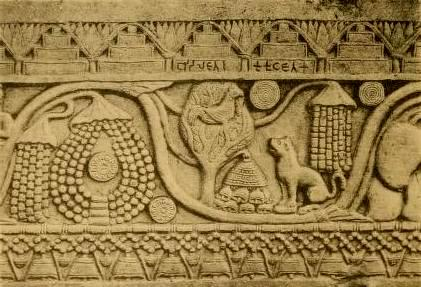
Scene from the Kukkuta Jataka story from the Bharhut stupa, 150 BCE.

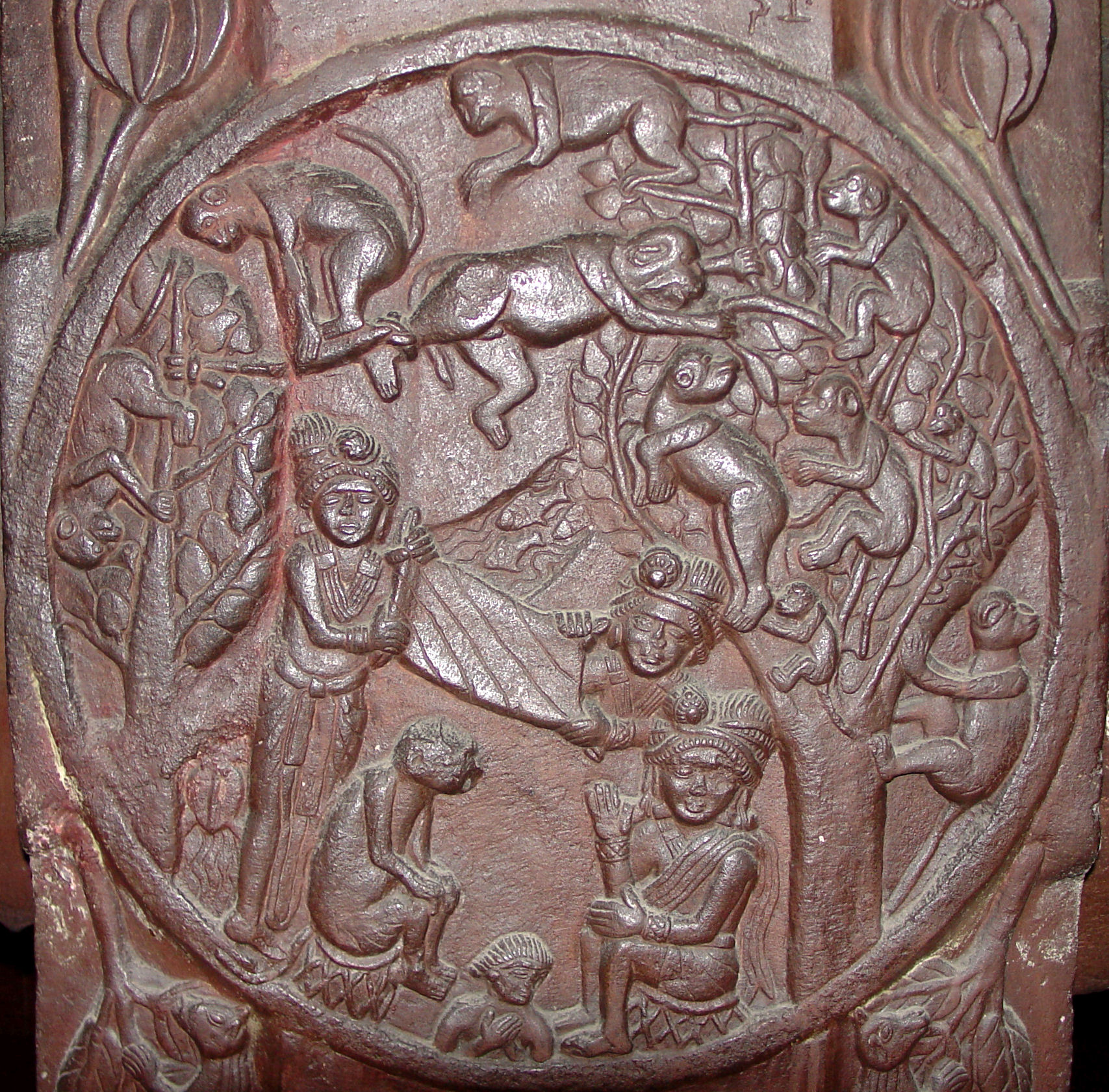
Scene from Mahakapi Jataka in Bharhut, 2nd century BCE.

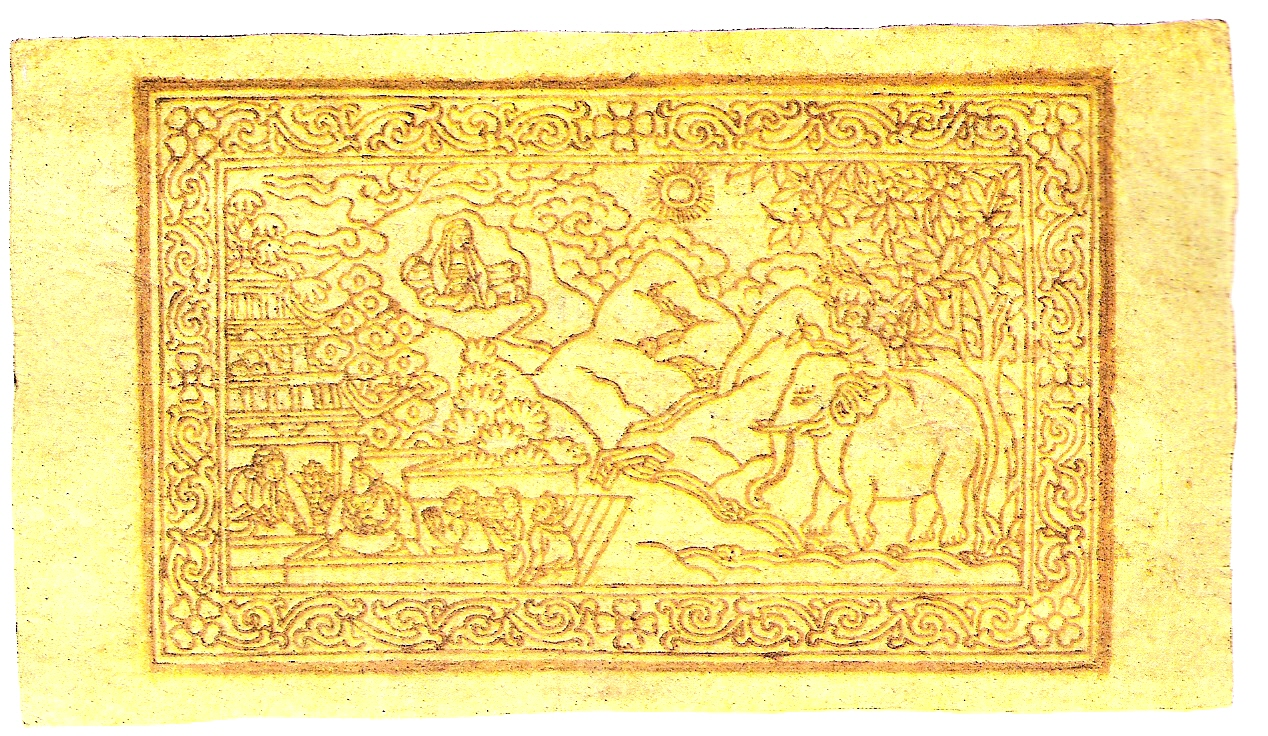
Scene from Tittira Jataka on backside of Tibetan 25 tam banknote, dated 1659 of the Tibetan Era (= 1913 CE).

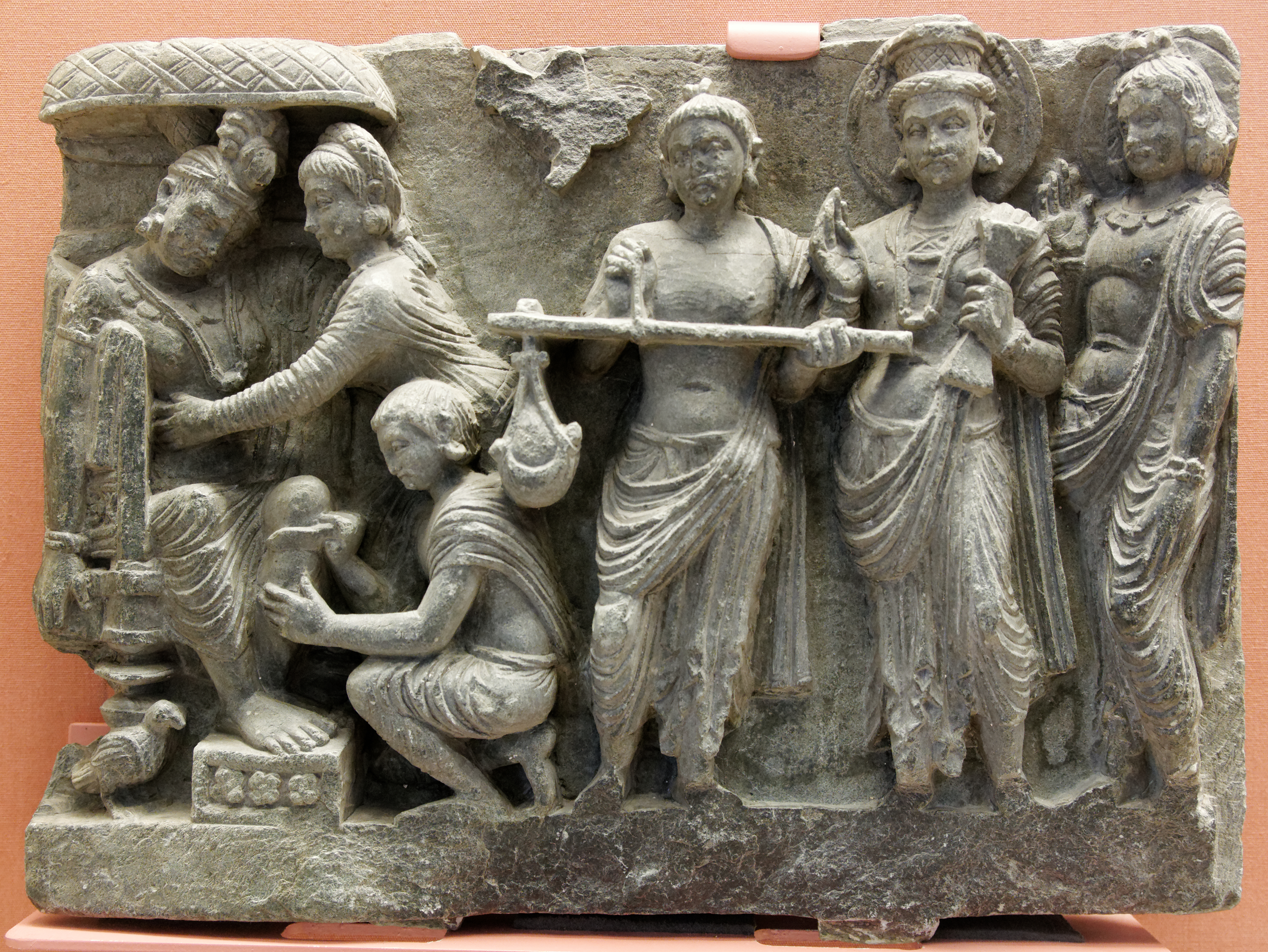
Slab with the scene from Shibi Jataka, Gandhara, 2nd–3rd century AD, British Museum.

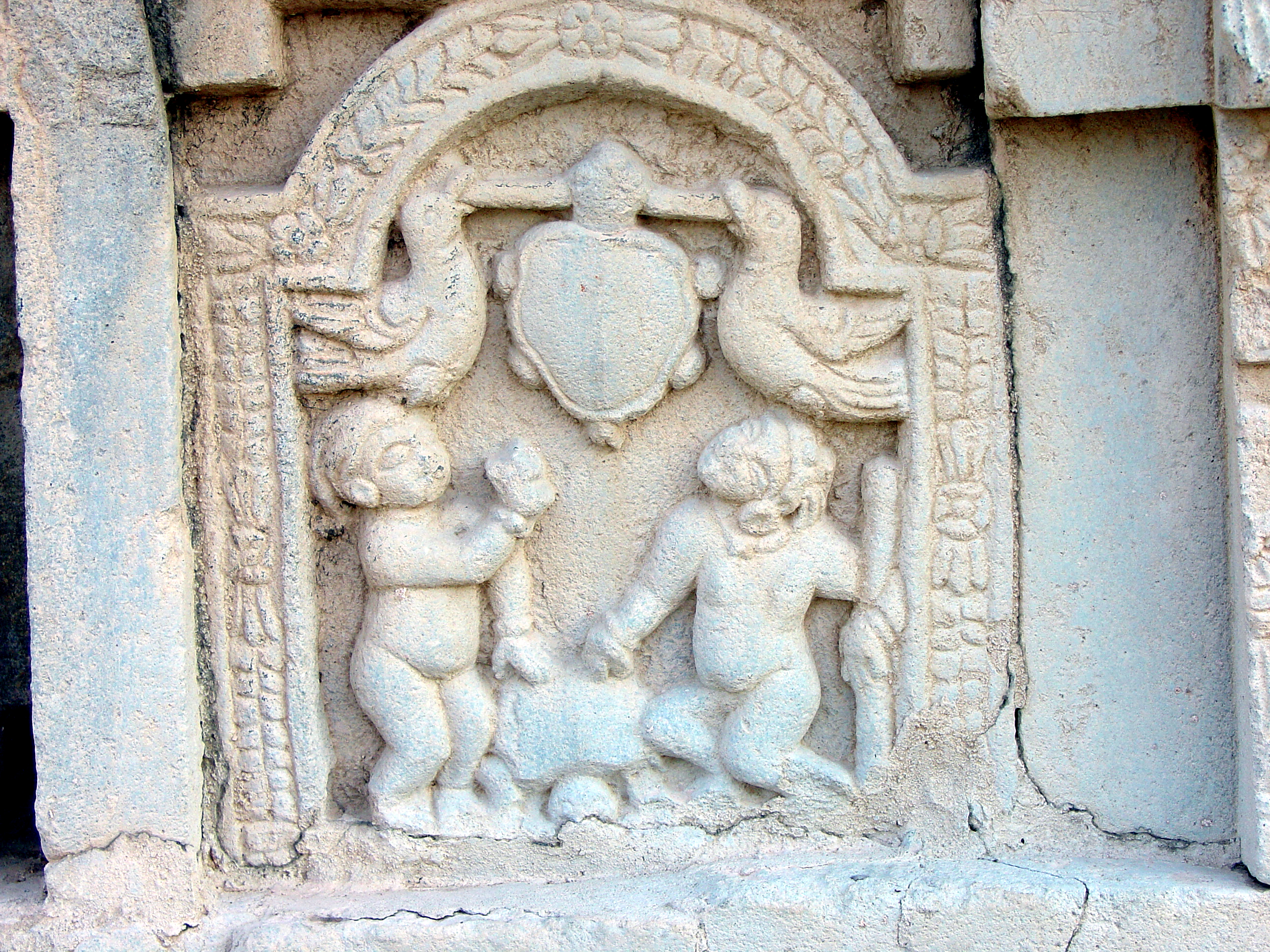
Scene from Kacchapa Jataka at Nalanda Temple 2, 7th cent ce.

Click on images to enlarge

== See also ==
- Jataka tales
- Mahanipata Jataka
- Pannasa Jataka
