= The sixteen dreams of King Pasenadi =

Story in post-canonical Buddhist texts

In Buddhist literature, the sixteen frightening dreams of King Pasenadi (Sanskrit; Pali: Mahāsupina Jātaka) is notable topic of Buddhism and dreamt by the King Pasenadi of Kosala and their Interpretations by the Gautama Buddha.

Buddha used Anāgatam Nyandaw (အနာဂတံ ဉာဏ်တော်) to visualise the nightmares. Then he explained that the nightmares are the terrible things that will happen in the future. When the time reaches after 2500 Sāsanā Years (သာသနာနှစ်) or circa 1957 A.D, the foretold events will take place. The pictures depicting the sixteen nightmares are found in some pagodas in Myanmar.

== The 16 frightening dreams ==
=== First dream ===
- The four strong oxen, from North, East, South and West, came to fight against one another in front of the king. But when they are about to fight, they retreated instead.

Meaning: "When bad people lead, the dark clouds came to rain, but just thunder instead, thus destroying certain crops and leading people to starve."

=== Second dream ===
- The young plants are bearing fruits.

Meaning: "When people begin to have short lifespan, young people will marry and have kids even when they are below 18 years old."

Mahārāja, imassā pi vipāko lokassa parihāyanakāle manussānaṁ parittāyukakāle bhavissati. Anāgatasmiñhi sattā tibbarāgā bhavissanti, asampattavayāva kumāriyo purisantaraṁ gantvā utuniyo ceva gabbhiniyo ca hutvā puttadhītāhi vaḍḍhissanti. Khuddakarukkhānaṁ pupphaṁ viya hi tāsaṁ utunibhāvo, phalaṁ viya ca puttadhītaro bhavissanti.

"Great King, as a result of this, when the world is declining, the lifespan of humans will decrease. In the future, beings will have strong desires, and young girls, not having found partners, will go to men out of season, and they will grow up with sons and daughters. Like the flowers of small trees, their youthfulness will be short-lived, and like fruits, their sons and daughters will be few."

=== Third dream ===
- The female cow feeds on the milk of her child.

Meaning: "When people stop respecting the elders, the parents will live with their children, for not having anyone to rely on."

Imassā pi vipāko anāgate eva manussānaṁ jeṭṭhāpacāyikakammassa naṭṭhakāle bhavissati. Anāgatasmiñhi sattā mātāpitūsu vā sassusasuresu vā lajjaṁ anupaṭṭhāpetvā sayam-eva kuṭumbaṁ saṁvidahantāva ghāsacchādanamattam-pi mahallakānaṁ dātukāmā dassanti, adātukāmā na dassanti. Mahallakā anāthā asayaṁvasī dārake ārādhetvā jīvissanti tadahujātānaṁ vacchakānaṁ khīraṁ pivantiyo mahāgāviyo viya. Itonidānam-pi te bhayaṁ natthi, catutthaṁ kathehi, mahārājāti.

This consequence will also occur in the future when respect for elders is lost among humans. In the future, beings will neither feel shame towards their parents nor their parents-in-law. They will only take care of their own households and will give even the bare necessities of food and clothing to the elderly only if they wish to, and will not give if they do not wish to. The elderly will live dependent on the goodwill of children, just as large cows live on the milk from calves born that very day. Because of this, they will have no protection.

=== Fourth dream ===
- A farmer is using young cows for transportation and abandons strong ones.

Meaning: "People will hire young, inexperienced people in certain jobs, especially judging crimes. Not being able to work well, the young people will quit the jobs and old people will not reapply for their previous jobs, which leads to the demise of a country."

Imassā pi vipāko anāgate eva adhammikarājūnaṁ kāle bhavissati. Anāgatasmiñhi adhammikakapaṇarājāno paṇḍitānaṁ paveṇikusalānaṁ kammaṁ nittharaṇasamatthānaṁ mahāmattānaṁ yasaṁ na dassanti. Dhammasabhāyaṁ vinicchayaṭṭhāne pi paṇḍite vohārakusale mahallake amacce na ṭhapessanti, tabbiparītānaṁ pana taruṇataruṇānaṁ yasaṁ dassanti, tathārūpe eva vinicchayaṭṭhāne ṭhapessanti, te rājakammāni ceva yuttāyuttañca ajānantā neva taṁ yasaṁ ukkhipituṁ sakkhissanti, na rājakammāni nittharituṁ. Te asakkontā kammadhuraṁ chaḍḍessanti, mahallakā pi paṇḍitāmaccā yasaṁ alabhantā kiccāni nittharituṁ samatthāpi: “Kiṁ amhākaṁ etehi, mayaṁ bāhirakā jātā, abbhantarikā taruṇadārakā jānissantī” ti {1.338} uppannāni kammāni na karissanti, evaṁ sabbathā pi tesaṁ rājūnaṁ hāni yeva bhavissati, dhuraṁ vahituṁ asamatthānaṁ vacchadammānaṁ dhure yojitakālo viya, dhuravāhānañca mahāgoṇānaṁ yugaparamparāya ayojitakālo viya bhavissati.

This consequence will also occur in the future during the time of unjust kings. In the future, unjust and poor kings will not honor the deserving officials, those skilled in ancestral knowledge, and those capable of completing tasks. In the court of law, they will not appoint wise and skilled elders as ministers, but will instead bestow honor upon the opposite type, appointing young and inexperienced individuals in their places. These inexperienced officials, ignorant of what is right and wrong, will neither be able to sustain their positions nor complete the king's tasks. Failing to manage their responsibilities, they will abandon their duties. The wise and capable elder ministers, though able to complete the tasks, will think, ''What use are these tasks to us? We are outsiders; the young insiders will know what to do,' and will not undertake the tasks that arise. Thus, the kings will invariably face decline, much like when calves are yoked to carry a heavy load or when a series of oxen fit for heavy labor are not yoked together."

Fifth dream

- The horse with two heads eats wheat from two different containers instead of eating together.

Meaning: Evil judges will take the bribery of both the defendant and the jurors, and they will decide the crimes however they want."

Imassā pi anāgate adhammikarājakāle yeva vipāko bhavissati. Anāgatasmiñhi adhammikā bālarājāno adhammike lolamanusse vinicchaye ṭhapessanti, te pāpapuññesu anādarā bālā sabhāyaṁ nisīditvā vinicchayaṁ dentā ubhinnam-pi atthapaccatthikānaṁ hatthato lañjaṁ gahetvā khādissanti asso viya dvīhi mukhehi yavasaṁ.

"This consequence will also occur in the future during the time of unjust kings. In the future, unjust and foolish kings will appoint greedy and unprincipled people to positions of judgment. These foolish individuals, disregarding good and bad deeds, will sit in court and make decisions while taking bribes from both parties involved in disputes, eating like a horse with two mouths."

=== Sixth dream ===
- People encourage a wolf to urinate on the golden cup.

Meaning: "Good people will not be respected or praised, thus reducing reputation. So, they have to make friends with bad people for the sake of their reputation."

Imassā pi vipāko anāgate yeva bhavissati. Anāgatasmiñhi adhammikā papi rājāno dhammika kulaputtānaṁ āsaṅkāya yasaṁ na dassanti, adhammika kulaputtānaṁ yeva dassanti. Evaṁ mahākulāni duggatāni bhavissanti, lāmakakulāni issarāni. Te ca kulīnapurisā jīvituṁ asakkontā: “Ime nissāya jīvissāmā” ti papi dhītaro dassanti, iti tāsaṁ kuladhītānaṁ papinehi saddhiṁ saṁvāso jarasiṅgālassa suvaṇṇapātiyaṁ passāvakaraṇasadiso bhavissati.

"This consequence will also occur in the future. In the future, unjust and wicked kings will not honor righteous noble sons due to distrust but will instead favor unrighteous noble sons. Thus, great families will fall into poverty, while inferior families will become powerful. Those noblemen, unable to sustain themselves, will say, 'We will live by depending on these people,' and will give their daughters in marriage to wicked men. Therefore, the association of noble daughters with wicked men will be like placing a golden bowl in front of an old jackal."

=== Seventh dream ===
- A man is making threads and places them near his legs. A hungry, female wolf tries to eat the thread without letting him know.

Meaning: "Women will not consider about the money their husbands have tiredly made. They will spend the money for clothes, food, drinks, jewelry and gambling without letting their husbands know."

Imassā pi anāgate yeva vipāko bhavissati. Anāgatasmiñhi itthiyo purisalolā surālolā alaṅkāralolā visikhālolā āmisalolā bhavissanti dussīlā durācārā, tā sāmikehi kasigorakkhādīni kammāni katvā kicchena kasirena sambhataṁ dhanaṁ jārehi saddhiṁ suraṁ pivantiyo mālāgandhavilepanaṁ dhārayamānā antogehe accāyikam-pi kiccaṁ anoloketvā gehe parikkhepassa uparibhāgena pi chiddaṭṭhānehi pi jāre upadhārayamānā sve vapitabbayuttakaṁ bījam-pi koṭṭetvā yāgubhattakhajjakādīni sampādetvā khādamānā vilumpissanti heṭṭhāpīṭhake nipannachātasiṅgālī viya vaṭṭetvā vaṭṭetvā pādamūle nikkhittarajjuṁ.

"This consequence will also occur in the future. In the future, women will be attached to men, alcohol, ornaments, streets, and material things. They will be immoral and of bad conduct. These women, after their husbands labor hard in agriculture, cattle-tending, and other work, will drink alcohol with lovers, wear garlands and perfumes, and ignore even urgent household duties. They will entertain lovers in their homes, through holes and cracks in the walls. They will use the seeds meant for the next day's planting to prepare porridge, rice, and snacks, thus depleting the household resources. They will squander the household wealth, rolling around like hungry jackals lying down on the ground, with the rope lying at their feet."

=== Eighth dream ===
- There is a large pot surrounded with other small pots. Although the large pot is overflowing, people come and pour water only into the large pot and no one pour water into the small pots.

Meaning: "People will experience poverty because of their evil leaders. They have to work hard for their leaders and not for their family which leads to starvation."

Imassā pi anāgate yeva vipāko bhavissati. Anāgatasmiñhi loko parihāyissati, raṭṭhaṁ nirojaṁ bhavissati, rājāno duggatā kapaṇā bhavissanti. Yo issaro bhavissati, tassa bhaṇḍāgāre satasahassamattā kahāpaṇā bhavissanti, te evaṁ duggatā sabbe jānapade attano va kamme kāressanti, upaddutā manussā sake kammante chaḍḍetvā rājūnaññeva atthāya pubbaṇṇāparaṇṇāni vapantā rakkhantā lāyantā maddantā pavesentā ucchukhettāni karontā yantāni karontā yantāni vāhentā phāṇitādīni pacantā pupphārāme ca phalārāme ca karontā tattha tattha nipphannāni pubbaṇṇādīni āharitvā rañño koṭṭhāgāram-eva pūressanti, attano gehesu tucchakoṭṭhe olokentā pi na bhavissanti, tucchakumbhe anoloketvā pūritakumbhe pūraṇasadisam-eva bhavissati.

"This consequence will also occur in the future. In the future, the world will decline, countries will be without protection, and kings will be unfortunate and impoverished. Whoever becomes a ruler, in their treasury will be only a hundred thousand coins. These unfortunate rulers in every country will engage in their own deeds, abandoning their responsibilities. Disturbed people will forsake their own tasks, instead plundering the treasures of kings, plundering and devouring, plundering and devouring, carrying away whatever they can find, cooking in their fires, making flower gardens and fruit orchards, picking the fruits and flowers as they bloom, and gathering treasures like the previous rulers' belongings, filling the king's palace as if it were their own. They will not even look at their own homes' empty vessels, but will fill full vessels.

=== Ninth dream ===
- Animals drink water from a large lake which is polluted around the centre and clean around the edge.

Meaning: "The future leaders will not be sympathetic to their citizens. They will force the citizens to pay a lot of taxes. Not being able to withstand the heavy tax, they will move to the countryside."

Imassā pi anāgate yeva vipāko bhavissati. Anāgatasmiñhi rājāno adhammikā bhavissanti, chandādivasena agatiṁ gacchantā rajjaṁ kāressanti, dhammena vinicchayaṁ nāma na dassanti, lañjavittakā bhavissanti dhanalolā, raṭṭhavāsikesu nesaṁ khantimettānuddayā nāma na bhavissanti, kakkhaḷā pharusā ucchuyante ucchugaṇṭhikā viya manusse pīḷentā nānappakārena baliṁ uppādentā dhanaṁ gaṇhissanti. Manussā balipīḷitā kiñci dātuṁ asakkontā gāmanigamādayo chaḍḍetvā paccantaṁ gantvā vāsaṁ kappessanti, majjhimajanapado suñño bhavissati, paccanto ghanavāso seyyathā pi pokkharaṇiyā majjhe udakaṁ āvilaṁ pariyante vippasannaṁ.

In the future, there will also be consequences for this. In the future, rulers will be unrighteous. They will rule based on desires, without considering justice. They will be greedy for wealth, harsh, and without compassion for their subjects. They will oppress people like pulling out an arrow, and, like robbers, they will extort money from people through various means. When people, unable to give any more, abandon villages and towns and go to the outskirts to live, the central regions will become empty. The outskirts will be filled with dense forests, like a pond filled with muddy water surrounded by clear water.

=== Tenth dream ===
- Rice is cooked in a single pot. However, some portions are overcooked, some undercooked and some are cooked right.

Meaning: "It will not rain properly, i.e some areas get a lot of rain while other areas don't. Such a rain destroys certain crops and results in crops of different qualities although they are grown in same field."

Imassā pi anāgate yeva vipāko bhavissati. Anāgatasmiñhi rājāno adhammikā bhavissanti, tesu adhammikesu rājayuttā pi brāhmaṇagahapatikā pi negamajānapadāpīti samaṇabrāhmaṇe upādāya sabbe manussā adhammikā bhavissanti, tato tesaṁ ārakkhadevatā, balipaṭiggāhikā devatā, rukkhadevatā, ākāsaṭṭhadevatāti evaṁ devatā pi adhammikā bhavissanti. Adhammikarājūnañca rajje vātā visamā kharā vāyissanti, te ākāsaṭṭhavimānāni kampessanti, tesu kampitesu devatā kupitā devaṁ vassituṁ na dassanti, vassamāno pi sakalaraṭṭhe ekappahārena na vassissati, vassamāno pi sabbattha kasikammassa vā vappakammassa vā upakārako hutvā na vassissati. Yathā ca raṭṭhe, evaṁ janapade pi gāme pi ekataḷāke pi ekasare pi ekappahāreneva na vassissati, taḷākassa uparibhāge vassanto heṭṭhābhāge na vassissati, heṭṭhā vassanto upari na vassissati. Ekasmiṁ bhāge sassaṁ ativassena nassissati, ekasmiṁ avassanena milāyissati, ekasmiṁ sammā vassamāno sampādessati. Evaṁ ekassa rañño rajje vuttasassā tippakārā bhavissanti ekakumbhiyā odano viya.

The outcome of this dream will come in the future. In the future, there will be unjust kings, and among them, both the just and unjust, the rulers, Brahmins, householders, and people will all become unjust. Then, even the protective deities, those who accept offerings, tree deities, and deities in space will also become unjust. The winds under the rule of unjust kings will be erratic and harsh, causing the celestial palaces to shake. When these palaces shake, the deities, angered by the shaking, will refuse to let rain fall. Even if it rains throughout the entire kingdom, it will rain only in one place, or it will not rain at all. Even if there is rainfall, it will not be beneficial for agriculture or cultivation. Just as in a kingdom, so too in the countryside, villages, towns, and cities, there will be no uniform rainfall. In the upper regions, there will be excessive rainfall, while in the lower regions, there will be none. In one part, crops will perish due to excessive rain, while in another, they will wither due to lack of rain. One area will suffer from drought, while another will be flooded. One king's reign will resemble a pot filled with rice that is neither fully cooked nor uncooked."

=== Eleventh dream ===
- A man buys a valuable ruby with a liquid.

Meaning: "People will spread Buddha's teachings, asking for donations and spend for their own good. This is equivalent to buying the teachings with a few money."

Imassā pi anāgate yeva mayhaṁ sāsane parihāyante vipāko bhavissati. Anāgatasmiñhi paccayalolā alajjī bhikkhū bahū bhavissanti, te mayā paccayaloluppaṁ nimmathetvā kathitadhammadesanaṁ cīvarādicatupaccayahetu paresaṁ desessanti, paccayehi mucchitā nissaraṇapakkhe ṭhitā nibbānābhimukhaṁ katvā desetuṁ na sakkhissanti, kevalaṁ: “Padabyañjanasampattiñceva madhurasaddañca sutvā mahagghāni cīvarādīni dassanti” iccevaṁ desessanti. Apare antaravīthicatukkarājadvārādīsu nisīditvā kahāpaṇaaḍḍhakahāpaṇapādamāsakarūpādīni pi nissāya desessanti. Iti mayā nibbānagghanakaṁ katvā desitaṁ dhammaṁ catupaccayatthāya ceva kahāpaṇaḍḍhakahāpaṇādīnaṁ atthāya ca vikkiṇitvā desentā satasahassagghanakaṁ candanasāraṁ pūtitakkena vikkiṇantā viya bhavissanti.

In the future, within my dispensation, there will be consequences when disrespect arises. In the future, there will be many shameless monks who are greedy for the support of others. They will teach the Dhamma for the sake of robes and other requisites, using flattery and pleasing speech to entice others. They will not be capable of teaching for the sake of liberation, having become intoxicated by their support. They will only say, "Having heard sweet words and received valuable robes, they will show favor." Others will sit at the doors of royal chambers and other places, teaching for the sake of coins and wealth. Thus, having made the Dhamma a commodity, and for the sake of coins and wealth, they will sell it, like those who sell sandalwood essence for a hundred thousand coins, with the intention of filling their bellies.

=== Twelfth dream ===
- Dried gourds which usually float on water sank in the water.

Meaning: "Wicked people will get the duties of leading a country and people will start to believe in them."

Imassa pi anāgate adhammikarājakāle loke viparivattante yeva vipāko bhavissati. Tadā hi rājāno adhammika kulaputtānaṁ yasaṁ na dassanti, papinānaṁ yeva dassanti, te issarā bhavissanti, itare daliddā. Rājasammukhe pi rājadvāre pi amaccasammukhe pi vinicchayaṭṭhāne pi tucchalābusadisānaṁ papinānaṁ yeva kathā osīditvā ṭhitā viya niccalā suppatiṭṭhitā bhavissati. Saṅghasannipātesu pi saṅghakammagaṇakammaṭṭhānesu ceva pattacīvarapariveṇādivinicchayaṭṭhānesu ca dussīlānaṁ pāpapuggalānaṁ yeva kathā niyyānikā bhavissati, na lajjibhikkhūnanti evaṁ sabbathā pi tucchalābusīdanakālo viya bhavissati.

In the future, during the time of immoral rulers, there will be consequences for the world turning upside down. At that time, kings will not honor those of righteous but will honor those without virtue. They will be lords over others, while the rest will be poor. Even in the presence of the king, at royal gatherings, in the council chambers, and in decision-making meetings, discussions will revolve around those without virtue, like those who are steadfast and firmly established. Even in gatherings of the Sangha and in places of Sangha activities, as well as in discussions about robe offerings and other matters, discussions will be led by those of bad conduct, the wicked individuals, and there will be no shame for the virtuous monks, as if it were a time of worthless indulgence.

=== Thirteenth dream ===
- A large rock is floating in water.

Meaning: "When bad people rule, good people couldn't make strong statements in arguments. So, they are no longer appreciated.

Imassa pi tādise yeva kāle vipāko bhavissati. Tadā hi adhammikarājāno papinānaṁ yasaṁ dassanti, te issarā bhavissanti, dhammika duggatā. Tesu na keci gāravaṁ karissanti, itaresu yeva karissanti. Rājasammukhe vā amaccasammukhe vā vinicchayaṭṭhāne vā vinicchayakusalānaṁ ghanasilāsadisānaṁ kulaputtānaṁ kathā na ogāhitvā patiṭṭhahissati. Tesu kathentesu: “Kiṁ ime kathentī” ti itare parihāsam-eva karissanti. Bhikkhusannipātesu pi vuttappakāresu ṭhānesu neva pesale bhikkhū garukātabbe maññissanti, nā pi tesaṁ kathā pariyogāhitvā patiṭṭhahissati, silānaṁ plavanakālo viya bhavissati.

During such times, there will indeed be consequences. Immoral kings will honor the dishonorable, making them lords while the honorable will be degraded. None will show respect to them, only to the dishonorable. In royal and council chambers, the discussions of virtuous sons, skilled in deliberation, will not be considered. Instead, they will mockingly ask, "What are these people talking about?" Other actions will be taken. Even in gatherings of monks, positions and roles will not be given to the worthy, and their words will not be valued. It will be a time when moral standards are adrift.

=== Fourteenth dream ===
- A female frog tries to eat a large cobra.

Meaning: "Men would marry younger spouses and give them whatever they want. However, the spouses will scold them for lacking decision in certain cases."

Imassa pi loke parihāyante anāgate eva vipāko bhavissati. Tadā hi manussā tibbarāgajātikā kilesānuvattakā hutvā taruṇataruṇānaṁ attano bhariyānaṁ vase vattissanti, gehe dāsakammakarādayo pi gomahiṁsādayo pi hiraññasuvaṇṇam-pi sabbaṁ tāsaññeva āyattaṁ bhavissati. “Asukaṁ hiraññasuvaṇṇaṁ vā paricchadādijātaṁ vā kahan”-ti vutte: “Yattha vā tattha vā hotu, kiṁ tuyhiminā byāpārena, tvaṁ mayhaṁ ghare santaṁ vā asantaṁ vā jānitukāmo jāto” ti vatvā nānappakārehi akkositvā mukhasattīhi koṭṭetvā dāsaceṭake viya attano vase katvā attano issariyaṁ pavattessanti. Evaṁ madhukapupphappamāṇānaṁ maṇḍūkapotikānaṁ āsīvise kaṇhasappe gilanakālo viya bhavissati.

In the future, there will indeed be consequences as society declines. People, driven by strong greed and defilements, will behave like slaves to their desires, even to the point of treating their spouses as mere possessions. Both within households and in the broader society, there will be widespread violence and exploitation, all for the pursuit of material wealth. When questioned about the source of their riches, they will respond arrogantly, saying, "Wherever it is, let it be. What concern is it of yours? Whether I acquire it honestly or not, you, being born into my household, should know your place." They will use various means to oppress others, using their power like slave drivers, asserting dominance over their possessions.Just as bees intoxicated by the fragrance of flowers meet their end in the black serpent's poison, so too will there be times of great suffering and decline.

=== Fifteenth dream ===
- A crow is surrounded by golden Hamsas.

Meaning: "In the future, only people of bad characteristics will become the leaders. Not having anyone to rely on, good people will have to serve them."

Imassā pi anāgate dubbalarājakāle yeva vipāko bhavissati. Anāgatasmiñhi rājāno hatthisippādīsu akusalā yuddhesu avisāradā bhavissanti, te attano rajjavipattiṁ āsaṅkamānā samānajātikānaṁ dhammiko issariyaṁ adatvā attano pādamūlikanhāpakakappakādīnaṁ dassanti, dhammika rājakule patiṭṭhaṁ alabhamānā jīvikaṁ kappetuṁ asamatthā hutvā issariye ṭhite papina upaṭṭhahantā vicarissanti, suvaṇṇarājahaṁsehi kākassa parivāritakālo viya bhavissati.

In the future, during times of weak rulership, there will be dire consequences. The kings, lacking skill in war tactics and horse riding, will be incompetent in battles, leading to doubts about their ability to protect their kingdoms. In such times, they will hand over their authority to individuals from similar backgrounds, conceding power to those who are deserved. Virtuous individuals, unable to secure their livelihoods or establish themselves in royal households due to their lack of status, will wander around, unable to find sustenance. They will serve the wicked ones who have assumed power, surrounded by their followers like crows around a golden swan

=== Sixteenth dream ===
- Because goats feed on cheetahs, the cheetahs run in fear when they see goats.

Meaning: "When Wicked people became governors, they will claim the land of the good people and deports them. So, good people have to run away from those people."

Imassa pi anāgate adhammikarājakāle yeva vipāko bhavissati. Tadā hi adhammikanā rājavallabhā issarā bhavissanti, punnnā apaññātā duggatā. Te rājavallabhā rājānaṁ attano kathaṁ gāhāpetvā vinicchayaṭṭhānādīsu balavanto hutvā adhammikanānaṁ paveṇi-āgatāni khettavatthādīni: “Amhākaṁ santakāni etānī” ti abhiyuñjitvā tesu: “Na tumhākaṁ, amhākan”-ti āgantvā vinicchayaṭṭhānādīsu vivadantesu vettalatādīhi paharāpetvā gīvāyaṁ gahetvā apakaḍḍhāpetvā: “Attano pamāṇaṁ na jānātha, amhehi saddhiṁ vivadatha, idāni vo rañño kathetvā hatthapādacchedanādīni kāressāmā” ti santajjessanti. Te tesaṁ bhayena attano santakāni vatthūni: “Tumhākaṁyevetāni gaṇhathā” ti niyyādetvā attano gehāni pavisitvā bhītā nipajjissanti. Pāpabhikkhū pi pesale bhikkhū yathāruci viheṭhessanti, te pesalā bhikkhū paṭisaraṇaṁ alabhamānā araññaṁ pavisitvā gahanaṭṭhānesu nilīyissanti. Evaṁ adhammika ceva pāpabhikkhūhi ca upaddutānaṁ jātimantakulaputtānañceva pesalabhikkhūnañca eḷakānaṁ bhayena tasavakānaṁ palāyanakālo viya bhavissati. Itonidānam-pi te bhayaṁ natthi. Ayam-pi hi supino anāgataṁ yeva ārabbha diṭṭho. Brāhmaṇā pana na dhammasudhammatāya tayi sinehena kathayiṁsu, “bahudhanaṁ labhissāmā” ti āmisāpekkhatāya jīvitavuttiṁ nissāya kathayiṁsūti.

In the future, during times of unrighteous rule, there will be consequences. The unrighteous rulers will become powerful, while the righteous will suffer. These rulers will assert their authority over the righteous by forcefully taking their lands and possessions, claiming, "These are ours, not yours." When disputes arise, they will resort to violence, using swords and sticks to silence those who oppose them. Out of fear, the nobles will relinquish their belongings and retreat to their homes. Corrupt monks will harass the virtuous ones, causing them to seek refuge in the wilderness. Due to fear instilled by both the corrupt monks and the unrighteous, the virtuous will flee like deer escaping from hunters. This is the vision of the future. Even the Brahmins will not speak of righteous conduct, instead encouraging materialistic pursuits for their own survival.

== See also ==
- Buddhist eschatology
- Jataka tales
- List of Jatakas
- Jātaka (Pali Canon)

== Sources ==
- "Jataka Tales of the Buddha: Part IV". www.accesstoinsight.org.
- "The Sixteen Dreams of King Pasenadi Kosol". Saraniya Dhamma Meditation Centre.
- "Buddhist Relief Mission, Evil Dreams and the Military in Burma". www.brelief.org.
