= Aṭṭhāna Jātaka =

One of Buddhist jatakas

Aṭṭhāna Jātaka is the 425th story in the Jataka tales, a canonical corpus of literature in Theravāda Buddhism that recounts the previous lives of the Buddha. It belongs to the Aṭṭhaka-nipāta ('The Book of Eights'). The story shows that some things are impossible (aṭṭhāna), no matter how hard you try, and it stresses the importance of being able to tell the difference and make good decisions.

== Story ==
According to the canonical account, the story was narrated by the Buddha while he was staying at Jetavana about a monk who had become dissatisfied with his monastic life and wished to disrobe. The monk was lovesick for his former wife, who had persuaded him to return to the lay life. The Buddha told this story to demonstrate that this same woman had been ungrateful and treacherous to the monk in a past existence as well, and that he had once been wise enough to reject her.

In the past, when Brahmadatta was ruling in Varanasi, the Bodhisatta (the Buddha-to-be) was born into a wealthy merchant family. The Bodhisatta fell in love with a beautiful courtesan. For many years, he visited her daily, paying her a fee of one thousand pieces of money for her companionship. He was a loyal patron and lavished his fortune upon her.

One evening, the Bodhisatta arrived at her residence late and empty-handed, having forgotten to bring the usual fee. Despite their long-standing relationship and the immense wealth he had previously given her, the courtesan refused to receive him. She ordered her servants to physically remove him from the premises, stating that she did not extend credit to her company. This act of cold calculation broke the Bodhisatta's infatuation. He lost faith in the world after realizing that her love was purely materialistic and devoid of genuine affection. He left the city right away, journeyed to the Himalayas, and developed jhānas (meditative absorptions) as an ascetic.

The King Brahmadatta, a friend of the merchant, inquired about his disappearance. The King summoned the courtesan after learning that her greed had driven his friend away. He told her to bring the merchant back and said he would kill her if she did not. The courtesan was so frightened that she entered the woods and finally found the Bodhisatta's hermitage. She begged him to forgive her and asked him to come back to Vanarasi so they could live together again.

The Bodhisatta declined. He did not show anger, instead analogizing the reunion to other impossibilities:

Ganggā kumudinī santā,
saṅkhavaṇṇā ca kokilā
Jambū tālaphalaṃ dajjā,
atha nūna tadā siyā.

Translation:

When the Ganges stands still and becomes covered with sacred lotus;
When the black cuckoos turn white like a conch-shell;
When the rose-apple tree bears palm fruits—
then, and only then, might [our reunion] be.

The courtesan returned to the King and repeated these verses to the King. The King, understanding that his friend would never return, spared the courtesan's life but accepted that his friend was gone forever. Having delivered this discourse and expounded the Truths, the Bodhisatta became a sotāpanna, someone who has reached the first stage of Enlightenment.

== Analysis ==
The Aṭṭhāna Jātaka is frequently cited by Indologists as an example of the "motif of impossible conditions" in Indian literature. The American philologist Maurice Bloomfield categorized the story as a rhetorical "fable of impossible conditions" (adynaton), where a character uses a string of natural impossibilities.

The story features the economic power of courtesans (gaṇikā) in ancient India. The courtesan in the Aṭṭhāna Jātaka is depicted as a strong woman who manages her own finances and household. The Indian scholar Anil Kumar Tyagi describes her as an "omnipotent dictator" in her home, with the authority to dismiss even a long-term lover if he cannot pay her daily fee. Her rule, "I do not give my favours without a thousand pieces," shows that her work was purely business in the Mauryan era and that emotional feelings were seen as harmful to that business.
