= Mahakapi Jataka =

One of the Jataka tales

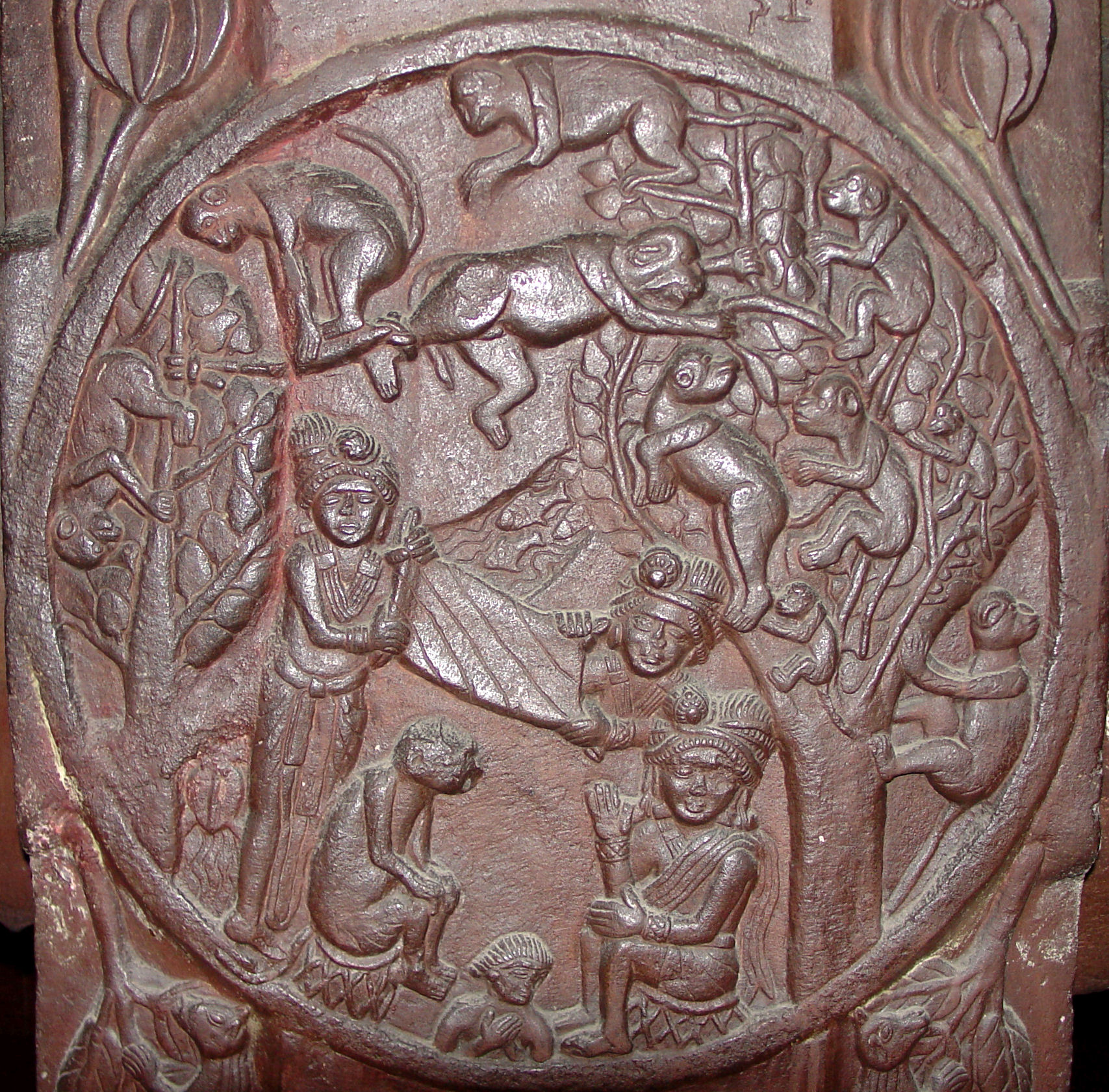
Mahakapi Jataka in Bharhut, 2nd century BCE.

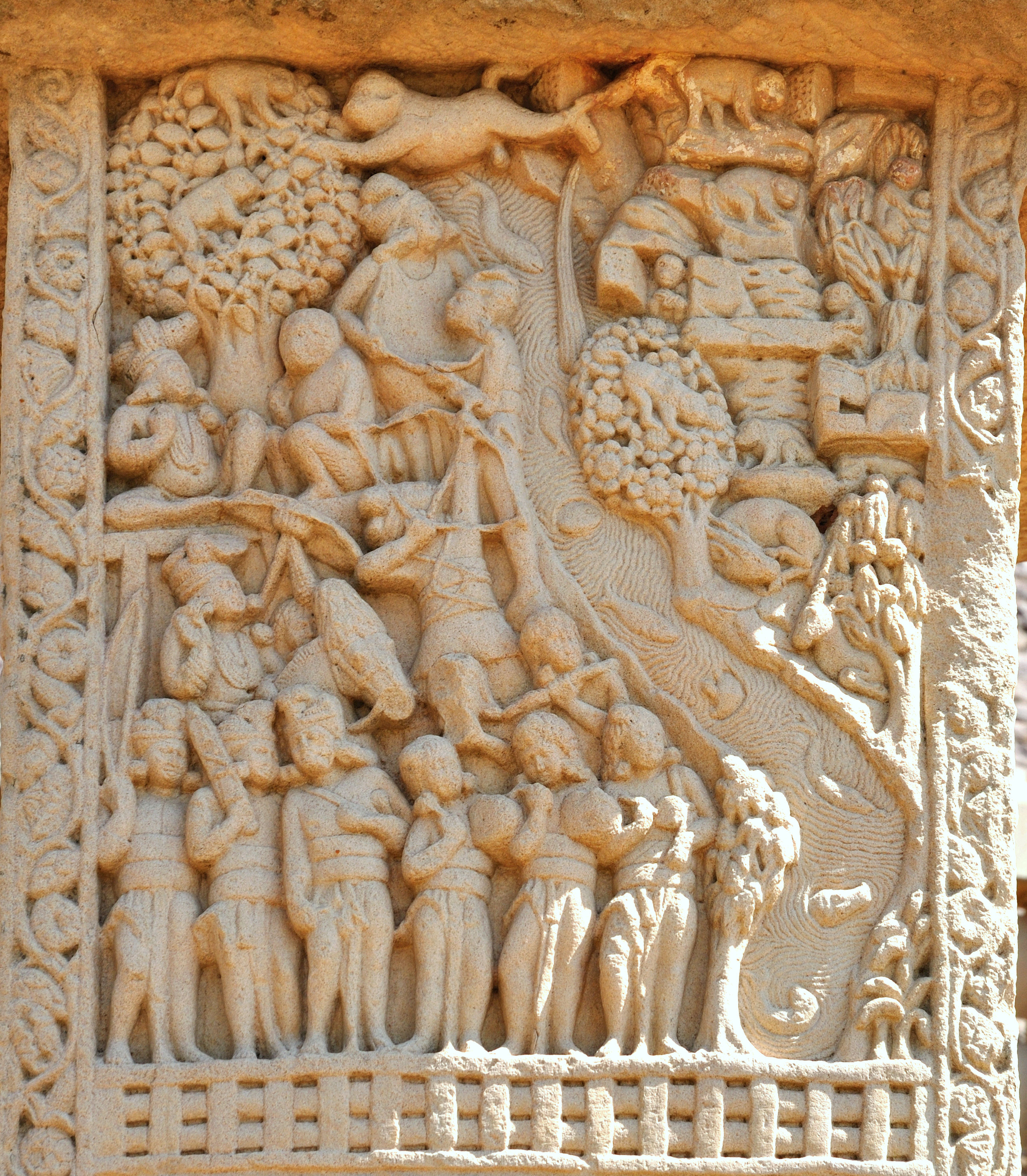
Mahakapi Jataka in Sanchi. The Buddha, in a previous life as the king of 80.000 monkeys, helps them flee and travel a stream with his own body. 1st century BCE.

The Mahakapi Jataka consists of two of the Jataka tales or stories of the former lives of the Buddha, when he was still a Bodhisattva, as a king of the monkeys.

== Story ==
The story runs that the Bodhisattva was born as a monkey, ruler over 80,000 monkeys. They lived at a spot near the Ganges and ate of the fruit of a great mango tree. King Brahmadatta of Benares, desiring to possess the mangoes, surrounded the tree with his soldiers, in order to kill the animals, but the Bodhisattva formed a bridge over the stream with his own body and by this means enabled the whole tribe to escape into safety.

Devadatta, the jealous and wicked cousin of the Buddha, was in that life one of the monkeys and, thinking it a good chance to destroy his enemy, jumped on the Bodhisattva’s back and broke his spine.

The king, seeing the good deed of the Bodhisattva and repenting of his own attempt to kill him, tended him with great care when he was dying and afterwards gave him royal obsequies.

== Depiction in Bharhut ==
In this jataka tale the Buddha, in a previous incarnation as a monkey king, self-sacrificingly offers his own body as a bridge by which his fellow monkeys can escape from a human king who is attacking them. A short section of the river, across which the monkeys are escaping, is indicated by fish designs. Directly below that, the impressed humans are holding out a blanket to catch him when he falls. At the very bottom (continuous narrative), the now recovered Buddha-to-be preaches to the king.

== Mahakapi Jataka (#516) ==
Separate from the previous Mahakapi-Jataka tale, Is Mahakapi Jataka. This second Mahakapi Jataka as its told in the Pali Canon, is no. 516 in the tenth book of the Khuddaka Nikāya, a section from the Sutta Piṭaka. Mahakapi Jataka no. 516 tells the tale of a Brahmin who found himself lost after searching for his stray oxen. The Brahmin after fasting for seven days sees a Tinduka (?) tree, and in an effort to retrieve the fruit, he supposedly fell "sixty cubits" into a hell-like abyss. The Bodhisattva, in the form of a great monkey, after eating the fruit, spies the Brahmin after ten days in the abyss. The Bodhisattva after practicing with a large stone retrieved the Brahmin from the Abyss and in return, asks to be guarded during his slumber. During the night when the Bodhisattva was sleeping, the Brahmin crushed his head with a rock. The Brahmin, who is now a Leper, later in his life travels to Beneres and speaks with the King, who asks why he has become a leper. The Brahmin poetically retells the previous events that lead to his turmoil and upon finishing his retelling, the earth opened beneath him and swallowed him whole, leaving only the King of Beneres. The Mahakapi Jataka #516 is also retold in the Sanskrit text, Aryasura's Jatakamala as number twenty-four.

== Mahakapi Jataka (#516) in Bharhut ==
The Mahakapi Jataka #516 also appears on a bas relief in Bharhut, however it remains mostly destroyed with only a few scenes from the Jataka legible. Three scenes appear in the relief, the first in the top-right corner, shows the great monkey practicing with a stone, or peering into the abyss. The second scene that appears in the middle depicts the monkey carrying the Brahmin on his back, out of the abyss. In the final scene we see the Brahmin holding a large stone above the monkeys head, seemingly to kill it.

== Depiction in Sanchi ==
Down the panel of the relief from Sanchi (Stupa No1, Western Gateway) flows, from top to bottom, the river Ganges. To the left, at the top, is the great mango tree to which two monkeys are clinging, while the king of the monkeys is stretched across the river from the mango tree to the opposite bank, and over his body some monkeys have already escaped to the rocks and jungles beyond.

In the lower part of the panel, to the left, is king Brahmadatta on horseback with his soldiers, one of whom with bow and arrow is aiming upwards at the Bodhisattva. Higher up the panel the figure of the king is repeated, sitting beneath the mango tree and conversing with the dying Bodhisattva, who, according to the Jataka story, gave the king good advice on the duties of a chief.

== Source ==
- Public Domain text of "A Guide to Sanchi" published in 1918 in India, John Marshall (1876-1958)
