= Preah Chinavong =

Khmer folktale

Preah Chinavong (Khmer: រឿងព្រះជិនវង្ស) is an apocryphal jataka tale of the Khmer sāstrā lbaeng tradition about a Khmer prince who falls into disgrace and, after a series of ordeals, regains his status.

== Plot ==
King Sovannavong and Queen Chin Bopha had a son named prince Chinavong. The king's three concubines also had three respective sons from him but felt they received less respect. After they plotted against him, killing their own children and accusing Chinavong of the crime, the latter was thrown into the sea by the king, only to be rescued by the Naga king.

Chinavong attracted more jealousy in the naga Kingdom and was sent out by the Naga king to find the hermit Ta Eisey from which he was to find magic powers to be used in battle. On the way, he is kidnapped by a giant woman, from whose captivity he escapes only to be chased after by her as well who finds him and beats him to death. Left for dead, Chinavong is brought back to life by Ta Eisey, who also teaches how to use the bow and arrow. After which, he returns to his father's kingdom and confronts in half-brothers.

As he goes with his mother to respect their ancestors' stupa, Chinavong seems the image of woman with whom he falls madly in love with and sets out too. In a tragic qui pro quo, she appears to have been married to another prince in the meantime. His romantic enemy, Tuos-sakann, who was mistakenly married to the princess' sister, nevertheless challenges him and is defeated by his magic powers, and therefore the father of those two princesses betrothes both to Chinavong. The latter flies off on his mechanical Hamsa with only one of them, Botum Sorya. Their engine brakes down in mid-flight throwing the pair into the ocean, where they are separated again.

Washed off to the share by the current, his magic powers and sword are stolen by the monkey Kamhaul Peano who is in turned killed by a giant called Chettra. Chinavong goes to appeal for his powers and sword to be returned to him, and the giant king Chettra goes beyond by betrothing him to his daughter. Meanwhile, Botum Sorya is saved by a crocodile who brings her to live surrounded by angels, until she eventually also becomes some sort of guardian angel or mrenh kongveal.

When the monkey king Kamhaul Peano returns at night to tell him about the whereabouts of his first love, Chinavong escapes at night, only to be chased after by his new wife who sees him gone out of bed in the morning. The father-in-law Chettra also follows suit only to bump into the first father-in-law which results in an epic confrontation over their common son-in-law. The two sisters of his fist marriage and his wife from his second marriage meet in their quest, and they finally find Chinavong, with the help of a giant who defeats the monkey king Kamhaul Peano who had been helping Chinavong get away.

All three wives return to the first kingdom where they all bear a son from Chinavong who after all, feels nostalgia for both the Naga kingdom and the angels who watched over Botum Sorya. He ends up marrying his descendance with a Naga princess and another with a kinnara angel, in a sort of alliance, between the human that he is, and the gods which he tried all his life to frequent.

== Origin ==
=== An oral tradition of Khmer folklore ===
Like the Reamker, the story of Preah Chinavong involves battles between kingly heroes of the settled land and yakkha kings of the forest. Narrating these adventures is "very complex and long". As many other apocryphal Jataka tales or Paññāsa Jātaka, it was developed as a patchwork of a network of local tales and legends that went through the process of palimpsest and palinode, thus resulting in certain inconsistencies and incongruities in the narrative.

The narrative echoes many other Khmer folk legends with which is its related such as the marriage of human warriors and naga princesses in the foundational legend of Preah Thong and Neang Neak.

=== A pictural heritage now vanished ===
The sala at Wat Kieng Svay Krom, in Kandal Province, was decorated with tableaux covering the entire story of Preah Chinavong until they disappeared some twenty years ago. These paintings are so dominant in the Mekong valley that one may wonder if these Khmer narratives did not supersede the Reamker at one point. The only painting that survives is one in which Preah Chinavong is depicted riding a reacheasei, the legendary royal monture which cross the lion, the horse and the tiger.

== Dance ==
Preah Chinavong is a classic of Khmer court dance having many elements in common with the dances of Preah Sorvong. It is particularly famous for its courteous love dance between Preah Chinavong and Neang Marady.

The "unconventional" diplomat, an ornithologist and art collector Malcolm MacDonald saw its performed in Angkor Wat during the Sangkum era and gave a detailed summary of it.

== Cinema ==
Sun Tek Méng was a Cambodian producer in the Sangkum era who created a production company called Preah Chinnavong Film which filmed mostly epic peplums based on Cambodian narratives such as Preah Chinavong: Chey Soravong Leak Soravong, the melodram of Tek Pnék Neang Kor or Sokunthong, with famed actress Keo Montha.

== Music ==
Preah Chinavong was put into music and sang by Khmer vocal legend Ros Sereysothea.

== See also ==
- Literature of Cambodia
- Vorvong and Sorvong
- Neang Kakey
