= Neang Kakey =

Neang Kakey (Khmer: រឿងនាងកាកី) is a Khmer sāstrā lbaeng tale and the best-known work composed as a melodrama in verse by future King of Cambodia Ang Duong in 1815 during the time he resided at the Royal Court in Thailand. The novel became a classic in modern post-Independence Cambodia and was incorporated in the curriculum for Khmer high schools.

== Origin ==
While he was studying at the Royal Court in Bangkok, King Ang Duong was inspired by the Thai folk tale Kaki Klon Suphap to write, when he was only 19 years of age, a similar tale in Khmer, about an unfaithful wife, far from virtue and what the canons of society expected at that time.

=== A Buddhist tale of virtue and vice ===
Ang Duong wrote during a time when traditional Buddhist Theravada was influential in Cambodia and when indulgence on physical beauty was strictly moderated. His melodrama around the misadventures of Neang Kakey were primarily derived from two jataka stories, Kakati Jataka and Sussondi Jataka, as part of a "tendency towards secularization of the Buddhist canonical hagiography". Both tales deal with the theme of a king experiencing difficulty in controlling his wife.

King Ang Duong also wrote another novel 'Puthisen Neang Kongrey admiring a faithful wife ready to sacrifice her life for her husband.

=== A Khmer palimpsest rather than a translation from the Thai ===
Neang Kakey was also inspired by the Thai folk tale Kaki Klon Suphap written by Hon Bunlong known as Phra Khlang who lived from 1750 to 1805, a famous writer at the Bangkok court. King Ang Duong substantively altered its main narrative however. The two versions of the story are not identical and Ang Duong did not author a mere translation as important differences exist in the plot. In the Siamese version of story, six men have sex with Kakey, namely King Brahma Tot, Krut Kunthean, Neay Sampov, Cham thieves and the king of Nokor Srey Tep. As for Khmer version, there are only three men who have sex with Kakey: King Brahma, Guru and Kunthean. While the story the Khmer Kakey ends with her tragically drowning in the sea, the Siamese Kakey is saved from drowning by Cham thieves and taken up as a concubine by King Nokor Srey Tep. All in all, in the Khmer version, the author blames Kakey completely, while in Siamese version, the author seems to pardon her mistake. Of the six men who had sex with Khaki, four are by rape and only two by consent. In the Khmer version, the tragic end reflects a certain vision of dharma, an end which a sinful life deserves.

== Plot ==
In the kingdom of Peareansey, during the reign of Prohmtoat, the royal consort Neag Kakey, first of all the royal concubines, is fooled by Garuda, counselor to the King, to sleep with her at night. After Garuda takes Neang Kakey to his kingdom, another royal counselor, Kânthan, is sent out to rescue her, but instead becomes her daytime lover while Garuda is unaware of becoming merely a nighttime lover. Garuda discovers her mischief and repudiates her. Neang Kakey is equally repudiated by King Promatoat with no mercy. Sent off all alone on a boat on the sea, Neang Kakey goes adrift for seven days sobbing in tears before being swallowed by the waves.

== Analysis ==
The story of Neang Kakey despite its legendary character is a valuable witness to the life and culture of Thai and Khmer society at the beginning of the 19th century.

=== A certain vision of women in Khmer society ===
Neang Kakey reflects a certain vision of women as well as certain standards of feminine beauty.

Women, as Neang Kakey, are described as inherently promiscuous. Where Neang Kakey is fooled into sleeping with the King's advisor, she carries the blame and is repudiated while the advisor is spared. This reflects the content of a law promulgated by King Ang Duong called Kram bier ('Treatise on gaming'), according to which women who frequented public houses could not be dishonoured in word or deed, as they are not considered respectable Educational tales intended to teach young women the good behaviour are common in Khmer literature. Another example is Mea Yea Neang or Mea Yea Dok Khney (រឿងមាយាដកខ្ញី). The narrative is in tone with the recommendations of the Chbab Srey, a code of conduct for Khmer women which Ang Duong will also contributed to.

=== A narrative description of the vivacity of Khmer culture in the 19th century ===
Neang Kakey also reveals a very rich culture. For example, when the singer of King Prohmtoat (Brahmadattha) plays pin to make Garuda who had kidnapped Queen Kakey suffer, in King Ang Duong's text, it is said that Kânthan (Gandhanta) played the pin without delay, and then began to sing the "Bât Kham Van*". Kânthan, a royal servant, knew, besides playing the pin, how to sing and metamorphose. Musicians generally bring back the "phleng khmer" type of music in its present form to the time of King Trâsâk Phaem. This is a literary proof of the antiquity of such music.

== Popularity ==
Alongside Tum Teav and certain Jataka tales, Neang Kakey is a popular story with which most Khmer are familiar.

=== First translation in French in 1903 ===
In Paris in 1903, French ethnologist Auguste Pavie published the first translation of Neang Kakey in French, which would later be re-edited by the Institute of Buddhist Studies in Phnom Penh in 1969.

=== A monument of Khmer literature since the 1950s ===
Together with Ang Duong's novel Puthisen Neang Kongrey, these two literatures became part of Khmer education textbooks after the Khmer independence in the 1950s.

=== A question on the place of women in Khmer society since the 1960s ===
In 1967 a popular Khmer song called Neang Kakey was composed by Mr. Svay Sam Oeur, arranged by Mae Buny and interpreted by Khmer popstar Sin Sisamuth. It describes "a good girl with high passion for the flesh" and denounces her illicit relationship. However, it seems that the songwriter and music arranger also had a sympathy toward the character of Kakey whose husband, the prince, already had many wives and did not care for her.

The song served as the soundtrack to a film version of Neang Kakey starring Vann Vannak and Vichara Dany. The reel of this movie was restored and released once more in 2019.

== See also ==
- Preah Chinavong
