= Chaophraya Phra Khlang (Hon) =

Thai nobleman

Chao Phraya Phrakhlang Hon
- เจ้าพระยาพระคลัง (หน)

Phrakhlang (Minister of Trade and Treasury)
- In office 1782–1805
- Monarch: Rama I
- Preceded by: Phraya Phrakhlang Son
- Succeeded by: Phraya Phrakhlang Kun

Personal details
- Died: 1805
- Parents: Chaophraya Surabodinluechai (father); Lady Charoen (mother)

Chaophraya Phrakhlang (Thai: เจ้าพระยาพระคลัง, died 1805), personal name Hon (Thai: หน), was the Phrakhlang or Siamese Minister of Trade from 1782 to 1805. He was also a prominent Thai author.

Hon was a son of Chaophraya Surabodinluechai the governor of Kamphaengphet in the Thonburi Period during the reign of King Taksin. His paternal family was of Chinese descent. In Thonburi Period, Hon held the title of Luang Sorawichit (Thai: หลวงสรวิชิต), a minor official in Uthaithani. During the Athi Wungyi's War in 1775, Luang Sorawichit Hon was assigned to guard the royal supply line at Nakhon Sawan. Sorawichit Hon translated one of the Vetala Tales from Sanskrit into Thai and composed Inao (Thai: อิเหนา), a Thai version of Panji tales, in 1779. During the unrest at the end of Taksin's reign, he supported the Chaophraya Chakri, who took the throne and became King Rama I in 1782.

Upon the ascension of King Rama I, Luang Sorawichit Hon was appointed Phraya Phiphatkosa (Thai: พระยาพิพัฒโกษา) the deputy Minister of Trade in 1782. However, in the same year, Phraya Phrakhlang the Minister of Trade, personal name Son, asked King Rama I for a pig head to be sacrificed in a ritual. King Rama I then considered Phrakhlang Son erratic and had him stripped of his position and title. Hon was appointed as the new Phraya Phrakhlang the Minister of Trade to replace Phrakhlang Son. During the Nine Armies' War in 1785, Phraya Phrakhlang Hon was assigned to lead the army of Prince Thepharirak to face the Burmese at Kamphaengphet and Tak. In 1788, when King Rama I led Siamese forces to attack Tavoy, Phrakhlang Hon was the provider of supplies for royal army. Phraya Phrakhlang Hon was later elevated to the rank of Chaophraya.

Chaophraya Phrakhlang Hon is best known for his translation of foreign historical literature into Thai language including the Burmese Razadarit Ayedawbon, which he translated into Thai "Rachathirat" (Thai: ราชาธิราช) in 1785, and Chinese Romance of Three Kingdoms, which he translated into Thai prose work "Samkok" (Thai: สามก๊ก) in 1802. Phrakhlang Hon also composed his own original poetic works that based on Thai local tales and traditions including;

- Kaki Kham Klon (Thai: กากีคำกลอน a retelling of the story of Kaki, based on the Buddhist text Kakati Jataka)
- Two rai yao chapters ("Kan Kuman" and "Kan Matsi") of the Vessantara Jataka

Chaophraya Phrakhlang Hon died in 1805. Hon had a half-younger brother named Long who was much younger than Hon himself. Long was the Chaophraya Phollathep or Minister of Agriculture during the reign of King Mongkut. and he has a brother named Chid. Chid has the title of Phra Suwan Phakdi. After the fall of Ayutthaya He moved to Ubon Ratchathani. Later, his descendants returned to serve in Rattanakosin.his great-grandson named Phra Maimanrajakich Surarithiruechai is the requester to use the surname "Maiman". So Chid and Hon is the ancestor of the Maiman family.
