= Kaki Klon Suphap =

Thai narrative poem

Kaki Klon Suphap (Thai: กากีกลอนสุภาพ) is a Thai narrative poem in the form of klon suphap, written by Chaophraya Phra Khlang (Hon) during the reign of King Rama I (1782–1809). It is based on the Kakati Jataka from the Pali Canon, and tells the tale of Nang Kaki (Lady Kaki), a stunningly beautiful palace consort who through coincidences and misfortune, ends up having to consort with various different male characters. In modern Thai slang, the term kaki (กากี) carries negative connotations, and is used as a derogatory term to describe a promiscuous woman who has relations with many men, despite the character of Kaki being unwillingly coerced, blackmailed or forced into having sexual relations with the various male characters throughout the folk tale.

== Plot synopsis ==
Thao Phromatat (Lord Phromatat) is the ruler of the city-state of Nakhon Paranasri, who despite his advanced age has a young royal consort known as Nang Kaki (Lady Kaki), whom he deeply loves and is greatly possessive of, forbidding anyone, even the palace courtiers, noblemen or even his closest male friends from seeing, or being in her presence. One of the few males allowed to be in the presence of Kaki is “Nadhkuvaen”, a khondhan, or demigod half-man half-angel who is attractive and skilled in the musical fields and poetry, and a favourite court musician of Thao Phromatat, often playing calming lullabies when he indulges in his favourite sport of saka (an ancient Thai sport similar to modern-day polo, but in folk tales and chronologies often depicted with magical flying horses). Aside from his close relatives, Thao Phromatat also plays saka with a close friend, a mysterious figure extremely skilled in the sport known as Vaenadhrai, who actually is a garuda in disguise, and lives at a distant palace called Chimbhli, situated on Mount Meru, unreachable by most mere mortals. Vaenadhrai takes the appearance of a muscular, attractive man, who refuses to tell Thao Phromatat where he comes from, but always arrives to play saka with him on a standard basis before leaving.

After hearing rumours of Vaenadhrai's perfect figure from the other ladies of the court, Kaki secretly watches him, both accidentally making eye contact at that second, and are mutually excited by each other's attractive figures, causing Vaenadhrai to formulate a plot to kidnap Kaki and take her from Thao Phromatat. He achieves this by transforming himself back into his fully-fledged garuda figure and blocks the sunlight and creates a great storm, causing those within the city of Nakhon Paranasri to panic. In the confusion, he snatches away Kaki and brings her to his Chimbhli Palace, where they engage in an affair, continuing to disguise himself as an attractive man while in the walls of the Chimbhli residence. Kaki's inexplicable disappearance causes great distress to Thao Phromatat. Nadhkuvaen, who is secretly in love with Kaki volunteers to find her. He deeply suspects Vaenadhrai, as on the day when the garuda made eye contact with Kaki, Naedhkuvaen himself was secretly watching, and later notices Vaenadhrai's irregular behaviour during the usual game of saka, and uses his demigod powers to transform himself into a flea, attaching himself to Vaenadhrai when he flies back to Chimbhli. He finds Kaki there, and coerces her into having sexual relations with him, threatening to expose her affair with Vaenadhrai to Thao Phromatat if she refuses. He returns to Nakhon Paranasri, and during the next scheduled game of saka, creates a poem with explicit details about Kaki, angering Vaenadhrai immensely. The garuda returns to Chimbhli and confronts Kaki about it, and, refusing to listen to her, returns her shamed and publicly humiliated to Thao Phromatat. Despite still loving her, the elderly king follows court protocol and punishes her by leaving her on a raft that is set afloat into the ocean without supplies.

After being stranded for days on the raft, and nearly dying, Kaki is rescued by a merchant who is dumbfounded by her beauty and marries her instantly. Shortly thereafter, the merchant's ship is attacked by pirates, with the pirate leader forcefully taking Kaki as his wife, before the entire pirate crew mutiny and slaughter themselves while fighting over Kaki once they dock. She manages to escape, and is rescued by an elderly ruler, 'Thao Dosavong, the widower ruler of another city-state, Paisali. He takes her as his queen, with Kaki refusing to tell him where she came from in fear that he would be disgusted by her and evict her from his city should he find out the truth. While Dosavong is senile and far too elderly compared to the other men in Kaki's life, he views her with affection and keeps her at his court.

Meanwhile, since having left Kaki to die in the ocean, Thao Phromatat is greatly depressed, and eventually passes away without a legitimate successor. The people of Nakhon Paranasri choose the popular Nadhkuvaen to be their next ruler. Nadhkuvaen still loves Kaki, and when he finds out that she is the queen of Paisali, he immediately has a royal ambassador demand Kaki's return from Paisali. When the city-state refuses to comply, he raises the Paranasri armies and sacks Paisali, taking back Kaki, and crowns her his queen.

== See also ==
- Ka Kee, 1980 film adaptation
- Neang Kakey, Khmer version
