= Vorvong and Sorvong =

Khmer folktale

Vorvong and Sorvong (Khmer: រឿងព្រេងភ្នំវរវង្សសូរវង្ស) is a long tale of the Khmer sāstrā lbaeng tradition about two Khmer princes who fall into disgrace and, after a series of ordeals, regain their status. Vorvong and Sorvong was revealed to a Western audience for the first time when it was put into writing by Auguste Pavie at the beginning of the 20th century.

== Plot ==
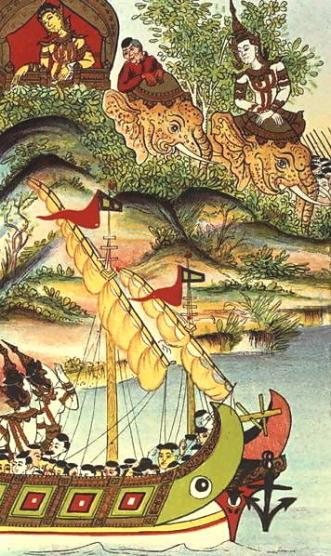
Vorvong and Sorvong Tale illustration. Khmer 19th century drawing.

Two princes, Vorvong and Sorvong, brothers, are mistakenly expelled from the royal court by their father the king. Separated from each other, they wander for a decade while facing incredible hardships and vicissitudes including defeating a giant in a cave, suffering the betrayal of the hermit Vorvongby, using magic rings and crystal balls, and repeated interventions by the gods. Finally, they are rejoined to do battle against their wicked stepbrother in a dramatic attempt to enlighten the king to the injustice they suffered, restore their titles, and bring peace and harmony to the kingdom.

== Origin ==
=== An oral tradition of Khmer folklore ===
Khmer folklore has a rich and varied oral tradition. There are many popular legends, tales and songs of ancient origin about mythical heroes, heroines and ghosts. These were not put into writing until the 19th and 20th centuries. Before then they had been memorized and told for generations.

The oral-tradition legends were often extremely long stories in rhyming verses. The heroes were mostly princes and supernatural beings and the scenarios were often connected to the palaces and the monasteries. One important purpose of these legends and stories handed down for centuries was to transmit norms and values. Most stories emphasize the peaceful resolution of conflicts.

Vorvong and Sorvong is one of the oral traditions of the Khmer folklore of unknown origin, apart from its geographical origin in Phnom Vorvong and Phnom Sorvong, where two mountains bare their names.

As is often the case in Khmer buddhism, the two heroes are considered boddhisatvas, earlier incarnations of the buddha, and as such they find themselves represented in various monasteries.

=== The hills of Kirirom National Park ===
There are two hills in Kirirom National Park — Phnom Sruoch District and Kampong Speu Province —which were named in honor of the two heroic princely brothers, Vorvong and Sorvong. The name "Kirirom" which means "Happy Mountain" name was given to the area by King Monivong in the 1930s to the mountain which were named Vorvong and Sorvong before then.

== Translations ==
=== First translation in Thai by future King Ang Duong around 1860 ===
During his residence in Thailand, Ang Duong composed poetry, authored and published classical Cambodian literature and historical works and later promoted the enactment of a comprehensive reformed legal codex and participated in the artistic development of Khmer classical dance. He translated the Cambodian folktale Vorvong and Sorvong into the Thai language as a birthday present for Thai Crown prince Mongkut.

=== Translation in French by Auguste Pavie in 1903 ===
Auguste Pavie, a French civil servant, obtained the folk legend version he wrote down from an "Old Uncle Nip" in Samraongtong District. The story was put into writing in Battambang.

In 1970, Khmer scholar Ly Theam Teng published the full legend of Vorvong and Sorvong in verse from a palm-leaf manuscripts which he had recovered. The epic matched the narrative written down 70 years prior by Auguste Pavie.

=== First English translation in 2019 ===
This first English translation was published in a full color edition featuring 51 illustrations in 2019. It was translated from the French by Marie-Helene Arnauld, with Jim Mizerski and Joel Montague providing the introduction and commentary.

== Adaptation for theatre ==
In November 2006 the Legend of Vorvong and Sorvong was enacted in dance form by the Royal Ballet of Cambodia to celebrate the French-Cambodian relations on the occasion of the 100th anniversary of the visit in France of King Sisowath, the 40th anniversary of the visit of the General de Gaulle in Phnom Penh but also the visit of State of King Norodom Sihamoni in November 2006 in Paris.

== See also ==
- Literature of Cambodia
- Neang Kakey
- Preah Chinavong
