= Popil =

Ancient Khmer type of candle holder

A popil or babil is an ancient type of candle holder that plays an important role in Khmer beliefs in both Hindu and Buddhist ceremonies.

== Etymology ==
The word popil was originally written volvel, which is found in three different Khmer inscriptions. In modern Khmer, popil is described as an iterative form of the vel, to turn, meaning to spin and containing the idea of moving things or people in circles.

== Origin ==
=== Khmer legend ===
According to a Khmer legend written down in the 1950s, a man named Chey Sorya had completed the magic training already with Lord Eyso or Shiva, so he asked the God for a sacred relic as a blessing tool for the weddings of human beings. Then the God gave the man a replica of his penis and a replica of his wife's vagina as the blessing tools to spread their reputation to the world. Eyso took diamond sand to make a gold banyan leaf representing his wife's vagina and took a diamond rock from the Himalayas to make a candle representing his penis and supposed them to be “two blessings”. He then told the man to take the candle wrapped in the banyan leaf to circle three times around grooms and brides in order to inhale the smoke making them powerful.

=== Archeology: between the popil and the hand-held mirrors ===
The popil is mentioned in stone inscriptions dating back to pre-Angkorian times, and they are at least three known occurrences of the popil in Khmer inscriptions. We find for example the mention of the gift of a popil in the inscription K. 240 in the second half of the tenth century.

However, identification of ancient popil in the extant archeological archive remains a challenge, as objects most resembling the modern popil have been systematically identified by archeologists as hand-held mirrors. On the other hand, others, such as Goerges Coedès and Jean Boisselier, connected the many bronze endings found in Angkorian archeological collections to be closely connected to the popil or ritual candle-holders.

== Description ==
Except for royal ceremonies, Khmer religious rituals are usually relatively devoid of sacred objects. A popil is most often made from metal alloy or sometimes of wood, popils are often shaped like betel or banyan leaves. They can also be rounded or decorated on the obverse with an embossed or carvings of popular religious figures like Tep Pranam (praying deity), Neary Phal (a decorated human figure), Neang Konhieng Preah Thorani (the goddess of the earth), Hanuman, Ta Eisey, or Preah Nareay (the gods Narayana or Vishnu in Sanskrit).

In the royal wedding ceremony, the popil takes the form of a carved statue of the goddess Uma Parvati, the wife of Preah Eiso (Shiva in Sanskrit), who first gave life to human beings. In some wedding ceremonies, popils decorated with figures of Tep Pranam or Neary Phal, women revealing only their upper half, are used to signify fertility and family lineage.

The metal objects with regards to the candle is positioned in a way analogous to the yoni and the linga; both the yoni and the popil holder are not objects in their own right but are pedestals. In fact, in Hinduism, the popil ritual is part of a prayer for well-being, and the popil is considered to symbolize Uma Parvati's yoni, while the candle symbolizes Preah Eiso's linga, a phallic symbol. The two are related to the development of the religious practices and daily customs of the Cambodian people.

== Use ==
=== Ritual: rotation of the popil (bangvel popil) ===
Popil rituals are an important part of Khmer ceremonies. In such rituals, a layman lights candles on the popil, and depending on the ceremony there can be three, five, seven, or nine of these. During a Khmer wedding ceremony, the groom salutes ceremonial areca leaves three times, and then musicians sing a song called roam baek veangnom (opening the curtains) in order to invite the bride to join the popil ritual. A layman then invites five or six couples to sit around the bride and groom, passing the popil around and praying for the happiness of the new couple symbolizing the cycle of life: older married couples sit in a circle around the bride and groom, pass around lit candles fixed to the popil, and wave the smoke toward the couple while praying, thus passing on Hindu blessings. Divorced women are not allowed to join in the rotation of the popil. Depending on the circumstances of the ceremony, three, seven, nine, or nineteen complete turns of the popil are accomplished before the candles are extinguished and their smoke is, one last time, bent back or blown towards the inside of the circle.

=== Various occasions: signaling a rite of passage ===
Today, the use of popils are a typical Khmer custom repeated in most rites of passage, ceremonies to mark the different stages of the life cycle, such as:

- pregnancy: in the 1940s, it was reported that a popil must be turned nineteen times around a pregnant woman in order to call forth the souls or pralung of the unborn child in her body
- koa chuk, the shaving of the top knot of hair that takes place when a child is from seven to ten years old; after the toupee has been cut, a popil is rotated around the child who is seated at the top of the ceremonial pavilion, facing east.
- puberty (chenh mlop): "coming out of the shadows" manifests availability for marriage; during the celebration, a popil is made to turn around a pile of raw rice on which the girl sits.
- weddings
- coronation of the new Khmer monarch, in order to offer the best wishes to Their Majesties the King and the Queen
- ordination of Buddhist monks
- calling of the souls: this rotation of the popil also serves to recall, or else to fix, the souls or pralung in the body of those for whom the ceremony is celebrated
- funerals: before the departure of the funeral procession, a popil is made to turn around the coffin; in what appears to be a unique case according to anthropologist Ang Choulean, instead of following the movement of the parikrama, five men with their backs turned to the coffin turn the popil in the opposite direction (prasavya)

== Bibliography ==
- Thierry, Solange (1984). Le popil: objet rituel cambodgien : une collection du Musée de l'homme (in French). Centre de documentation et de recherche sur la civilisation khmère. ISBN 978-2-86731-011-9.
- មនោយទឋ, ថាន (2020-09-15). "ពពល". AMS Khmer Civilization (in Khmer).
