= Ta Eisey =

Ancient Khmer hermit and culture hero

Ta Eisey, also known as Lok Ta Maha Eisey, is a foundational Khmer culture hero who is depicted as a hermit in Cambodia. It corresponds to the rishi of Vedic origin and represents the archetype of anachoretical life in Khmer culture. This heremetical figure is both the symbolic source of all laws and the patron of theatrical arts in Cambodia.

== Theogony ==
=== Brahmanic tradition ===
Shiva as a hermit in the Brahmanic tradition: from God to man
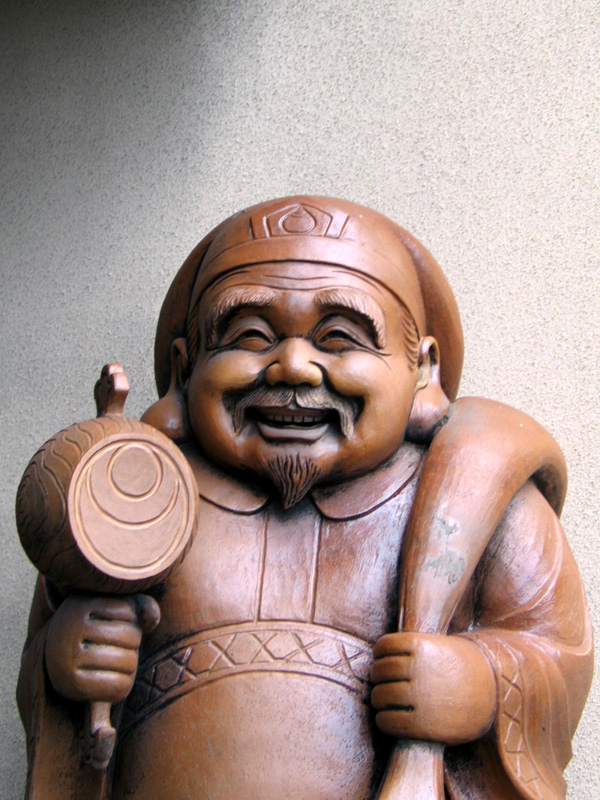
Daikokuten is a Shiva-Ōkuninushi fusion deity in Japan

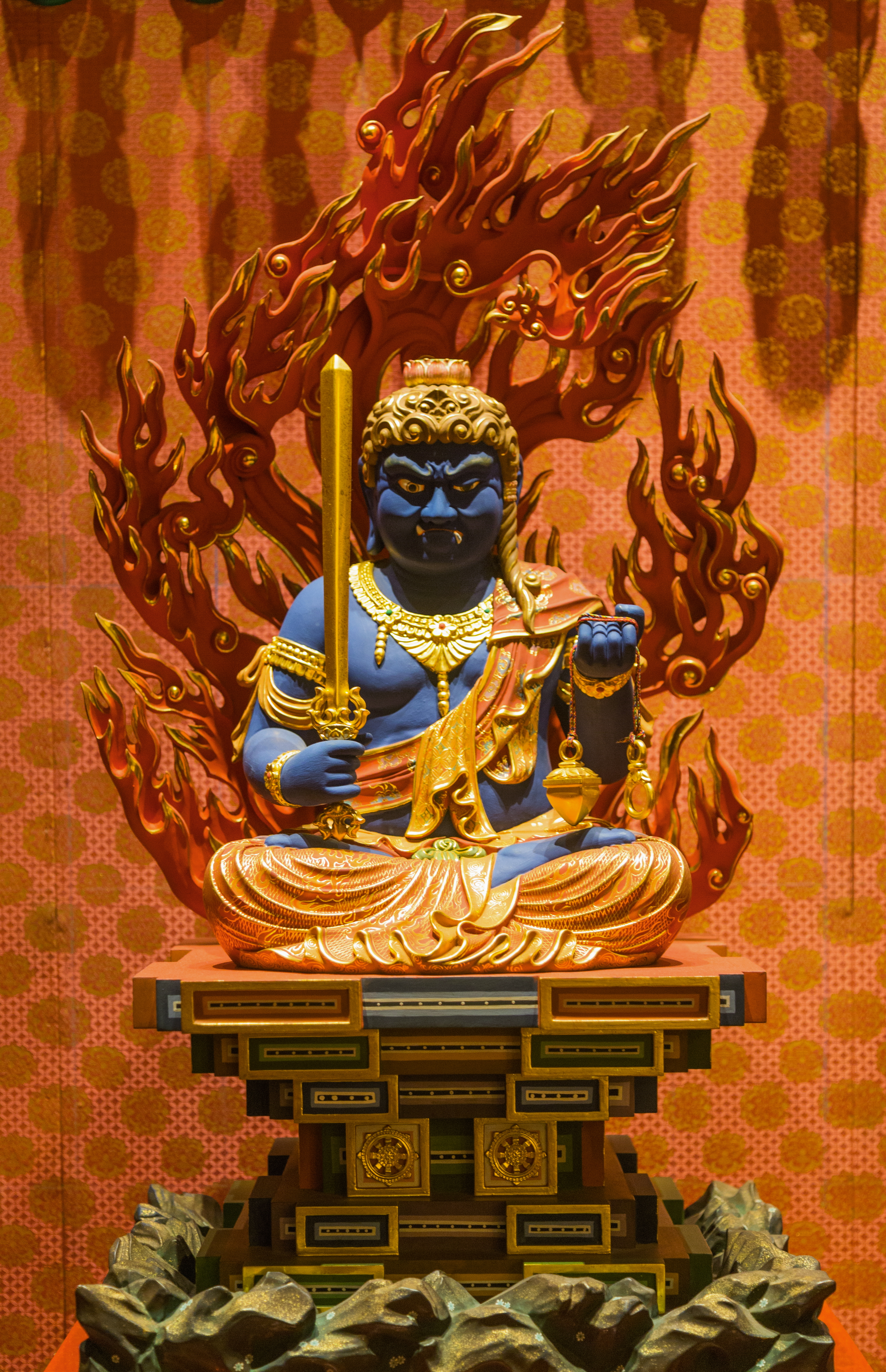
Acala is a fierce Shiva adaptation in both China and Japan

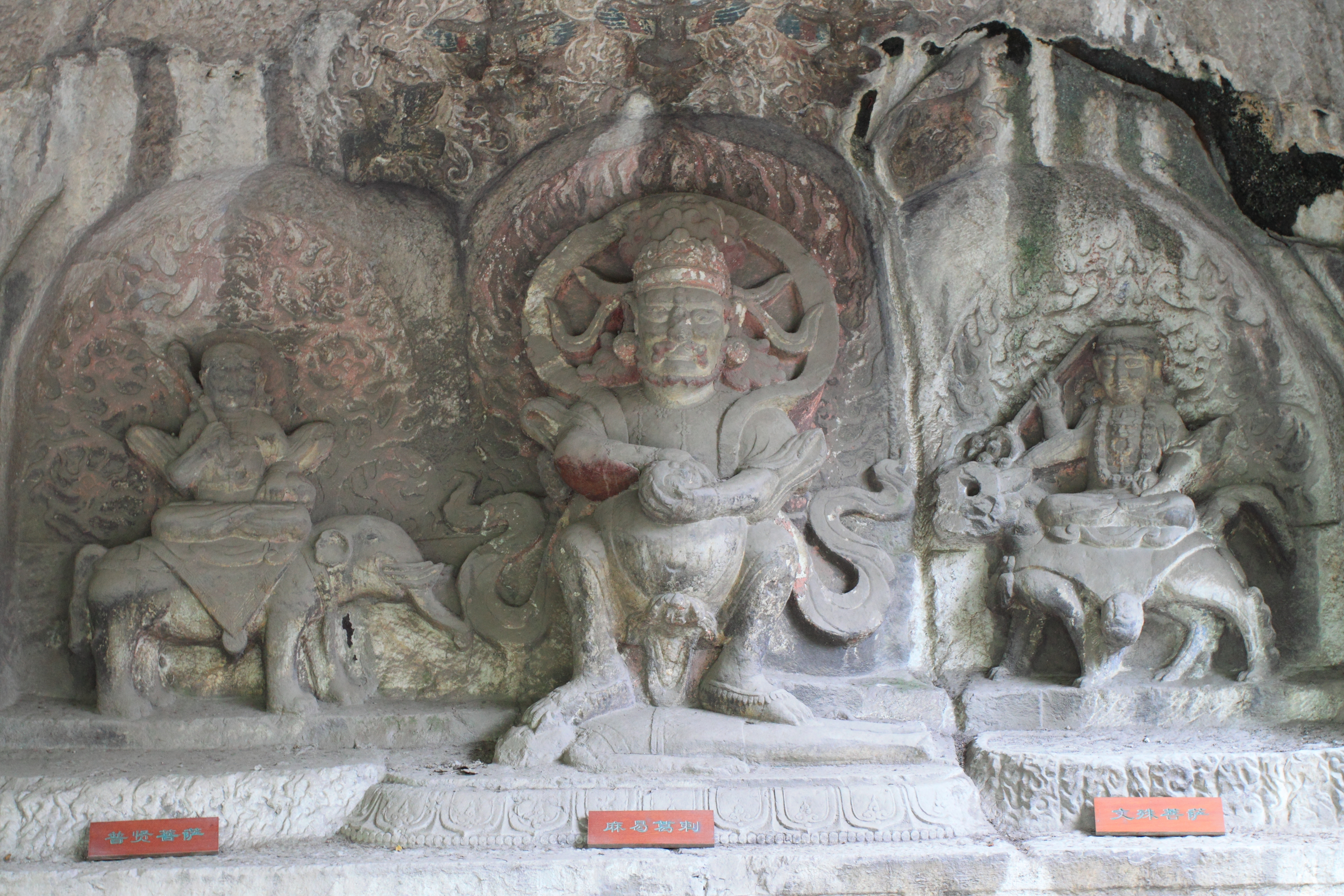
Mahakala (center) flanked by the bodhisattvas Samantabhadra (left) and Mañjuśrī (right). Baocheng Temple, Hangzhou, Zhejiang, China

Shiva has been merged with Buddhist deities in East Asian Buddhism. In contemporary Cambodia, Ta Eisey appears to many as a fusion deity of Shiva, whose name, Eiso, in Khmer, can also lead to an easy confusion of both.

==== Vishnuite hermits in Cambodia ====
The inscription of Prasat Komnap from the 9th century shows the presence of Vishnuite hermits in Cambodia: the inscription goes further to say that Buddhists of bad morals were declared ineligible for dwelling in their hermitage.

==== Bharata Muni, the hermit master of the theatrical arts ====
Ta Eisey is associated with the Indian legend of Bharata Muni, the ancient sage who the musical treatise Natya Shastra is traditionally attributed to. For hermits of Bharata, theatre served the same function as music did for the Pythagoreans. Lok Ta Maha Eisey is in fact regarded in Cambodia as the one from whom all knowledge of the arts emanate and the ultimate teacher spirit in Cambodian classical dance.

=== Buddhist tradition ===
==== Coexistence of monks and hermits in Khmer Buddhism: the ambiguity of the Vessantara Jataka ====
Ta Eisey is the Khmer figure of the hermit, who, in popular culture, could survive dangerous ordeals in the mountains, and merit to be fed by invisible higher beings who recognised their virtue and taught them magical powers. These powers included indestructibility, conjuring whatever they wished, travelling to far-off lands or underground, and omniscient powers of sight and hearing. Although the Ta Eisey Khmer hermit is said to be of Brahmanic tradition that has long been superseded by Buddhism, their statues are widely present in Buddhist monasteries in Cambodia. Some deceased monks are credited with having been Ta Eisey, showing a certain degree of appraisal for the ascetical life of the forest hermit.

On the other hand, other scholars, such as Collins, have argued that in Theravada Buddhist countries like Cambodia, the Vessantara Jataka and its depiction of hermits reveals a certain ambivalence toward ascetical voluntary poverty, considered as "a tragedy as well as a utopian fantasy".

==== Preah Namosara Eisey, source of all laws according to King Norodom ====
In 1872, King Norodom of Cambodia published a new collection of the laws of Cambodia which included the legend of Preah Namosar Eisey, a legend explaining the sacred origin of laws. Chau Namosara komar was the second son of brahmin Teveak Eisey and kinnara Tep Konthak. The child and the Ta Eisey hermit are still represented hand in hand in many Khmer pagodas, symbols of the transmission of ancient hereditary wisdom. In his 1898 French translation of this explanatory legend, Adhémard Leclère indicates that Preah Namosar Eisey is a local Khmer version of the essence of Manu, and the Laws of Manu, or Manusmriti, with Buddhist and Khmer additions.

==== The revival of a forest hermits in Thailand ====
Until the 1970s in Cambodia, hermits or solitaries in the forest represented the state of mysticism of the most exalted sanctity. Fervent monks were able to spend some weeks or some months in solitary hermitages.

Whereas the figure of Ta Eisay has disappeared from contemporary religious life in Cambodia as such, traditional hermits in Thailand still continue the lifestyle of ascetics claiming that they spend most of their time alone in the jungle, engaged in deep meditation, while they have been criticized as spiritual fads who simply profit from a “supernatural boom” in Asia.

== Cultural representation ==
=== Iconography ===
The iconography of Ta Eisey is two-fold: the first is the once which popular culture of Cambodia usually recognizes as Ta Eisey as carved in the Angkorian sites, the second is the one currently produced in the Khmer buddhists pagodas to represent Ta Eisey.

==== Meditative hermit of the Angkorian temples ====
In the Angkorian sites, the carved depiction of the hermit has been associated with Ta Eisey. He always has a long mustache, a fresh smile, in the position of meditation, as a person who has overcome all the worries of the world, but has not yet attained enlightenment.

Sitting upright on one's knees is the attitude of the root or ascetic of Brahmanism that responds: abstaining from metaphysics and holding on to Brahmanical behavior.

Sitting cross-legged vertically, the lower parts of his body forms a triangular V-shape with an acute downward angle, possibly representing the cosmic nature or feminine genitalia, and with both hands bowed to the chest, forming a right-angled triangle shooting upwards possibly representing the human world or male genitalia. This combination of two vertical legs and two parallel arms creates an hexagone space that combines two upper and lower triangles halfway together. The common space of the two triangles, or the space between the two arms and the two vertical legs, symbolizes time, which is one of the many names of Shiva. Although Hinduism has waned in Cambodian society today, the influence of these hermits in Cambodian society has been maintained as its iconography evolved.

==== Travelling hermit in the Buddhist pagodas ====
In modern-day Cambodia, plaster statues of Ta Eisey and other hermits are common at Buddhist temples and religious shrines. The hermit is depicted dressed as a long-haired and bearded man garbed in a tiger-skin robe, as mentioned in the Vessantara Jātaka, with a kettle and naga-staff, or holding the hand of a child. Ta Eisey is no longer seated in meditation, but walking as a pilgrim.

=== Dance ===
Ta Eisey is associated with dance as ultimate teacher spirit, the first human to receive knowledge of the arts in our tradition as well as his association with Shiva Nataraja, the Lord of Dance, who both creates and destroys the universe in his cosmic dance.

In the Royal Ballet of Cambodia, Neay Rong Moni Eisey (Khmer: នាយរងមោនីឥសី) is the wise sage or hermit, usually the male main character's master.

Until our modern days, dancers and actors in Cambodia keep the tradition of seeking the protection of Maha Eisey.

=== Literature ===
Ta Eisey is present in various Khmer folk legends, representing a figure of varying complexity with features of both wisdom and violence.

Ta Eisey is present in the Reamker Khmer epic as the "medium of mediums". Maha Eisey appears at the moment of Indrajit's death where he acts as the "grand master of the drama, as he is the supreme referee during the fight" between the white and the black monkey.

== See also ==
- Jīvaka, legendary Buddhist healer and patron of medicine
