= Sāstrā lbaeng =

Genre of Literature

Sāstrā lbaeng or lpaen is a genre of medieval Khmer literature often made of fantastic adventure romances. They were written in verse with a rich and elaborate vocabulary and used to entertain the audience via a public reader or chanter.

== Etymology ==
In Khmer language, sāstrā lbaeng translates as "works for pleasure".

== History ==
According to Ly Theam Teng, in the post-Angkor period most stories were sastra lbaeng for entertainment.

The 17th century witnessed the appearance of, lengthy verse-novels which recounted the ancient Jātaka tales. The oldest extant example, Khyang Sang (The Conch Shell), dates from 1729. Portraying the Buddhist concept of karma, many of the sāstrā lbaeng were used by monks as texts to teach Khmer boys to read and write.

Since 1980, purely secular sāstrā lbaeng have appeared whereas in the past the Buddhist background pervaded all elements Cambodian culture.

Some of these works, written on palm-leaf manuscripts, were cleaned and microfilmed with aid funding for the National Library in the early 1990s. Many of the palm leaf texts documented in these films have since been lost, because they had been stored in canisters in non-climate-controlled offices in Cambodia. The reels – the only surviving copies – are degrading and are at risk of being lost as well without proper preservation. Digitization of the manuscripts began in 2019, under the guidance of the Buddhist Digital Resource Center.

== Genre characterization ==
=== Apocryphal tales of the Buddha ===
The majority of sāstrā lbaeng are based around popular Buddhist tales particularly those contained in the apocryphal Jātaka collection known as Paññāsa Jātaka, some foremost examples being stories of Vorvong and Sorvong or Preah Chinavong.

=== A stereotypical structure ===
The literary elements of the sāstrā lbaeng include three parts:

- an introduction or eulogy which is found in classical Pāli literature to praise the Three Gems (Buddha, Dharma and Sańgha), while the later Khmer eulogy also request for being blessed with an auspicious. This eulogy is almost systematically closed off by the poet's excuses and disclaimer,
- a body or Atītavatthu, originating most often from the Jātaka literature, Mahanipata Jātaka, and its imitations, Paññāsa Jātaka, while some are purely fictional folk tales
- an ending or Samodhāna, which states which characters are derived from the time of Buddha.

=== A sentimental education through chanting ===
Sāstrā lbaeng were used widely in the monastery-based education of the laity, and even today traditionalist monks continue to chant versified romances based around the Buddha's past lives and the like, in a spare and stylized manner known as smot.

== Bibliography ==
- ศาสตราแลบง: วัฒนธรรมทางวรรณศิลป์ พัฒนาการ และความสัมพันธ์กับวัฒนธรรมเขมร (in Thai). 2007.

== Links ==
- "Entertaining verse texts - BUDA - Buddhist Digital Archives". khmer-manuscripts.bdrc.io.
