= Paññāsa Jātaka =

Non-canonical collection of the Buddha's past lives stories

Cover of a Thai edition of Paññāsa Jātaka published as a funerary book in 1961

The Paññāsa Jātaka (Burmese: ပညာသဇာတက; Thai: ปัญญาสชาดก) is a non-canonical collection of 50 stories of the Buddha's past lives, originating in mainland Southeast Asia. The stories were based on the style of the Jātakatthavaṇṇanā, but are not from the Pāli Canon itself. The stories outline the Buddha's biography and illustrate his acquisition of the perfections (pāramitā), with a strong focus on generosity (dāna).

== Origins ==
Various Paññāsa Jātaka stories have parallels with Sanskrit literature as well as Tamil, Chinese, Tibetan, Khotanese and Southeast Asian folk tales.

According to 17th and 18th century Burmese tradition, the stories may have originated in 15th century Lan Na (modern Northern Thailand). The Burmese name Zimmè Paññāsa (ဇင်းမယ်ပညာသ), in fact means 'Chiang Mai Fifty', and it is thought that these stories may have originated in that city in what is now northern Thailand from where the collection was likely transmitted. According to Damrong Rajanubhab, the stories were first composed in Chiang Mai between 1467 and 1667: however, this is unlikely to be correct. As some scholars have pointed out, the Paññāsa Jātaka tales were already well-known by the Sukhothai Era (1238-1438).

Many of the learned monks fled to Luang Prabang before and during the Burmese conquest of Chiang Mai in 1558, and others were taken to Burma. This could not only explain the spread of the Paññāsa Jātaka but also the increase in production of manuscripts containing Paññāsa Jātaka across mainland Southeast Asia.

== Versions ==
Because the tales were originally and for a long time transferred only orally, it is difficult to trace a precise evolution. Most of the surviving manuscripts containing one or more Paññāsa Jātaka date back to the eighteenth and nineteenth centuries, but many of them appear to be copies from older manuscripts. The collection has 3 recensions, one in Laotian and 2 in Pali, one from Burma, and another from Cambodia and Thailand. While there is some overlap between the versions, there is a significant degree of variation in the 3 recensions.

=== Thai royal edition ===
A royal edition of a selection of Paññāsa Jātaka was commissioned by King Mongkut also known as Rama IV, who rule from 1851 to 1868. The text was written mainly in Khmer script which was commonly used for Pali Buddhist scriptures in central Thailand up until the end of the nineteenth century.

The first printed Thai translation was published in 1923 under the direction of Prince Damrong Rajanubhab, a son of King Mongkut.

A set of northern Thai Paññāsa Jātaka transliterated from Thai Tham script into Thai script was published in 1998 under the auspices of Chiang Mai University. The international team of researchers involved in this project point out that the original manuscript version written in northern Thai Tham script is mainly in the Northern Thai language with added words and phrases in Pali.

In today's Thai collection of Paññāsa Jātaka, there are 61 tales. On television, a Thai telenovela genre known as "jakrawong" inspired from the Paññāsa Jātaka; fictionalized stories about royalty, often involving flashy, magical powers – remains popular despite decades of existence; however, virtues such as righteousness and morality are replaced with weapons and brute force. According to Niyata Lausunthorn, the modernization of the Paññāsa Jātaka has helped maintain its popularity until this day, despite it being, sometimes, a long departure from the Pali Canon's Jātaka.

=== Cambodian version ===
Paññāsa Jātaka in Cambodia, not being part of the Pāli Canon, quoted and modeled the style of the sāstrā lbaeng, fictional and educational Khmer literature. There are four types of Paññāsa Jātaka written on:

- palm-leaf manuscripts (sāstrā slikrit) both in Khmer and Pāli,
- edited collections from palm-leaf in Pāli in four volumes,
- Paññāsajātak Sankhep in Khmer, the summarized Paññāsa Jātaka, and
- Paññāsajātak Samrāy, a commentary on the Paññāsa Jātaka in four volumes.

Cambodian Jataka stories of Buddha's lives, depart from Indian models in depicting women for the most part as intelligent, active, and dignified, and detailing the consequences for men who do not treat women as their equals.

To the Paññāsa Jātaka, fifty-one more non-canonical Jataka tales were added by Song Siv who gathered them from Khmer folklore during the Sangkum era; they were published again in 8 volumes in 2002.

== Analysis ==
=== Ethics: the exaltation of self-sacrifice ===
Whereas mainstream Buddhist traditions do not promote martyrdom, Paññāsa Jātaka tales reveal a particular Southeast Asian value in the bodhisattva practice of self-sacrifice and devotion to parents and the Buddha, the Dhamma, and the Saṅgha.

== Iconography ==
Motifs that appear in some Paññāsa Jātaka can also be found on ninth-century reliefs at the Borobudur monument in Java, which suggests that some Paññāsa Jātaka may be derived from older pre-Buddhist Southeast Asian folklore.

== List of Jātaka Stories ==
=== First Part ===
There are 50 Jātaka

- Ādittaraja-jataka
- Tulakapaṇḍita-jātaka
- Sammājīvakumara-jataka
- Arindama-jātaka
- Sumbhamitta-jātaka
- Samuddaghosa-jātaka
- Cāgadhāna-jātaka
- Dhammika-paṇḍita-rāja-jātaka
- Sudhana-jātaka
- Ratanapajota-jātaka
- Sirivibbula-kitti-jātaka
- Vibbula-rāja-jātaka
- Siricūḍāmaṇi-jātaka
- Candarāja-jātaka
- Siridhaja-jātaka
- Ādita-jātaka
- Dukkammānika-jātaka
- Mahāsuraseṇa-jātaka
- Suvaṇṇakumāra-jātaka
- Kanakavaṇṇa-rāja-jātaka
- Viriya-paṇḍita-jātaka
- Dhammasoṇḍaka-jātaka
- Sudassana-jātaka
- Vaṭṭaṅguli-rāja-jātaka
- Porāṇa-kabila-rāja-jātaka
- Dhamarāja-jātaka
- Narajīva-jātaka
- Surūpa-jātaka
- Mahāpaduma-jātaka
- Bhaṇḍāgāra-jātaka
- Pahulākāvī-jātaka
- Seta-paṇḍita-jātaka
- Puppha-jātaka
- Bārāṇasi-rāja-jātaka
- Brahmaghosa-rāja-jātaka
- Devarukkha-kumāra-jātaka
- Salabha-jātaka
- Siddhisāra-jātaka
- Narajīva-kathina-dhāna-jātaka
- Atideva-rāja-jātaka
- Pācitta-kumāra-jātaka
- Sabbasiddhi-jātaka
- Saṅkhapatta-jātaka
- Candasena-rāja-jātaka
- Suvaṇṇakacchapa-jātaka
- Sisora-jātaka
- Varavaṃsa-jātaka
- Rathasena-jātaka
- Suvaṇṇasirassa-jātaka
- Vanāvāna-jātaka
- Pākuḷa-jātaka

=== End ===
There are 11 Jātaka

- Sonanda-jātaka
- Sīhanāda-jātaka
- Suvaṇṇasaṅkha-jātaka
- Surabbha-jātaka
- Suvaṇṇakacchapa-jātaka
- Devandha-jātaka
- Subhina-jātaka
- Suvaṇṇavaṃsa-jātaka
- Varanuccha-jātaka
- Sirassa-jātaka
- Candakādha-jātaka

=== Inserted Jātaka ===
There are 3 Jātaka

- Pañcabuddha-pārājika-pañhā (or Pañcabuddha-byākaraṇa)
- Pañcabuddha-sakkacca-vaṇṇanā
- Ānisaṃsa-pābhañjukula-paṭisaṃyutta

== See also ==
- Buddhist ethics
- Khuddaka Nikāya
- Jataka tales
- List of Jatakas
- Sāstrā lbaeng
- Mahanipata Jataka
- Vessantara Jātaka
- Kalaket
