= Vessantara Jātaka =

Story of one of Gautama Buddha's past lives

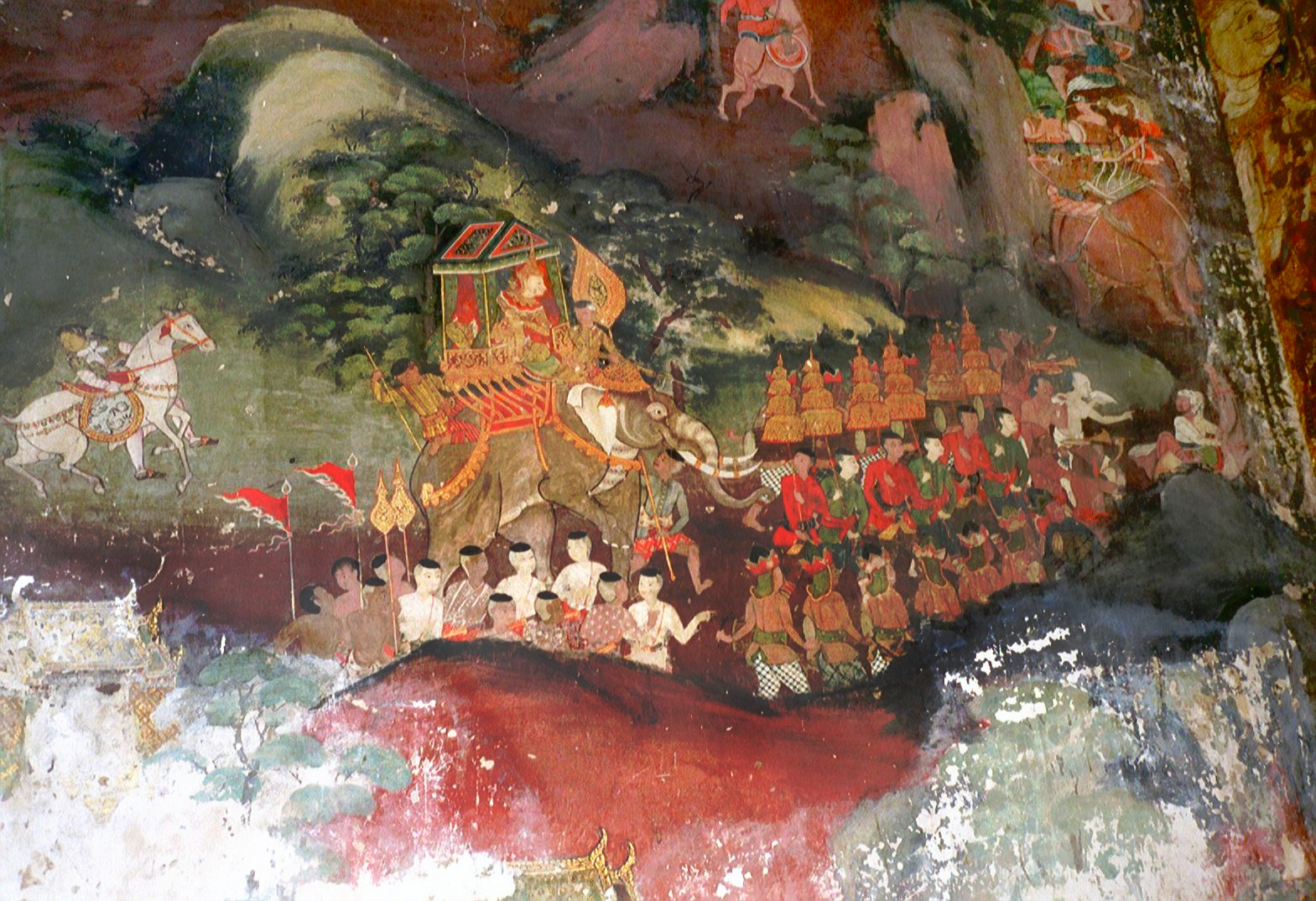
Vessantara Jataka mural, 19th century, Wat Suwannaram, Thonburi district, Bangkok, Thailand

The Vessantara Jātaka is one of the most popular jātakas of Theravada Buddhism. The Vessantara Jātaka tells the story of one of Gautama Buddha's past lives, about a very compassionate and generous prince, Vessantara, who gives away everything he owns, including his children, thereby displaying the virtue of perfect generosity. It is also known as the Great Birth Sermon.

The tale of Prince Vessantara is celebrated as an annual festival in Thailand, Laos, Myanmar, Sri Lanka and Cambodia.

== Accounts ==
The story has slight variations in other parts of Asia: in Tibet, the story is known as the Jīnaputra Arthasiddhi Sūtra and the prince known as Arthasiddhi; in China, it is known as Taizi Xudanuo Jing and the prince is known as Sudana (須大拏太子). He is known as Shudaina-taishi in Japan.

When Gautama Buddha visited his father's kingdom for the first time after he achieved enlightenment, elders of the ruling dynasty did not pay him respect out of conceit, since they were older than the former Prince Siddhartha. The Buddha miraculously appeared in the air above his relatives. His father was the first to bow down and admit that it was time to pay respect to his own son. Other members of the dynasty then bowed down and accepted the religion. Suddenly, rain clouds gathered and a red-drop rain appeared. This miracle led to his followers asking, "What is this rain?" He then explained that this rain had appeared once before during his previous life. Then, he told them the story of his life as King Vessantara.

=== Vessantara's birth and youth ===
King Vessantara was the son of Sañjaya, king of Sivi, and was born in the capital city of Jatuttara. At this point, Buddhist tradition regards him as a bodhisatta (Sanskrit: bodhisattva), a Buddha-to-be.

His mother, according to tradition, was a princess who did great meritorious deeds and wished to become the mother of the person who would be the next Buddha. After she died, the princess ascended to heaven and became one of the consorts of a deva called Indra. She lived happily until the day she had to be reborn again as a human. Indra gave her ten boons she could ask for, and one of wishes she made was "Let me become the mother of bodhisattva, who in his next life will achieve enlightenment". She descended to the human world, was born in the court of a king, and later married to King Sañjaya.

On the last day of her pregnancy, the Queen wished to sight-see in the capital city. Her husband granted her that wish. She visited several districts, and the people were delighted by their queen. While she was in the merchant quarter, she gave birth in an emergency delivery at the bazaar, in the heart of the city. Therefore, the newborn prince and heir was named Viśvantara (Vessantara), which means 'Born in the merchant quarter'. As soon as he opened his eyes, the infant prince asked his mother for money to give to the poor. On the same day, a female elephant brought her newborn calf to the royal palace. The calf was pure white.

Vessantara grew up to be a kind person who was willing to give away his belongings to others. His parents were delighted by their son's character and supported the prince's charity with their treasures. Vessantara married princess Madri. They had two children: the Prince Jali and the Princess Krishnaajina. Sañjaya retired and Vessantara was crowned King.

=== Banishment and life as hermit ===
One day, Vessantara gave away the magical white elephant, which had brought rain to his kingdom, to envoys from Kalinga, a neighboring country which was facing a drought. The citizens of Vessantara's kingdom were distressed by the fear of drought because of the loss of the elephant. Thus, they convinced King Sanjaya to resume control of the kingdom and banish his son Vessantara.

The king readily gave away his kingdom to his father. Before leaving the city and going to live in the forest as a rishi (hermit) with his wife Madri and their two children, Jali and Kanha, he also gave away his wealth.

One of his loyal courtiers suggested that the family should live at Vamka Mountain. They left the city on a four-horse chariot. Along the way Vessantara gave away his horses and four deities appeared in the form of stags to pull the chariot. Then he gave away his chariot. The family walked on foot through a forest. The young prince and princess saw wild fruit hanging on high branches, but their parents could not reach it. Miraculously, all the trees bent their branches for them.

The family then arrived at the neighbouring kingdom of Ceta. The king of Ceta was informed of their arrival and rushed to greet the prince. He was touched by their story and offered his throne, but the prince declined. He and his family also declined to stay in a palace. They started to live celibate lives on a mountain called Vamka. The king of Ceta ordered a hunter to patrol the entrance to the mountain, to prevent anyone from disturbing the family.

Meanwhile, Jujaka, a greedy old brahmin who lived as a beggar, had a very young wife, Amittada, who was also very beautiful and hard-working. During the drought, Amittada regularly brought water from the well for her old husband. The husbands of the other women in the village held her up as an example of a good industrious wife. One day, in a fit of jealousy, all the village women gathered by the well and beat up the Brahmin's young wife, tearing her clothes.

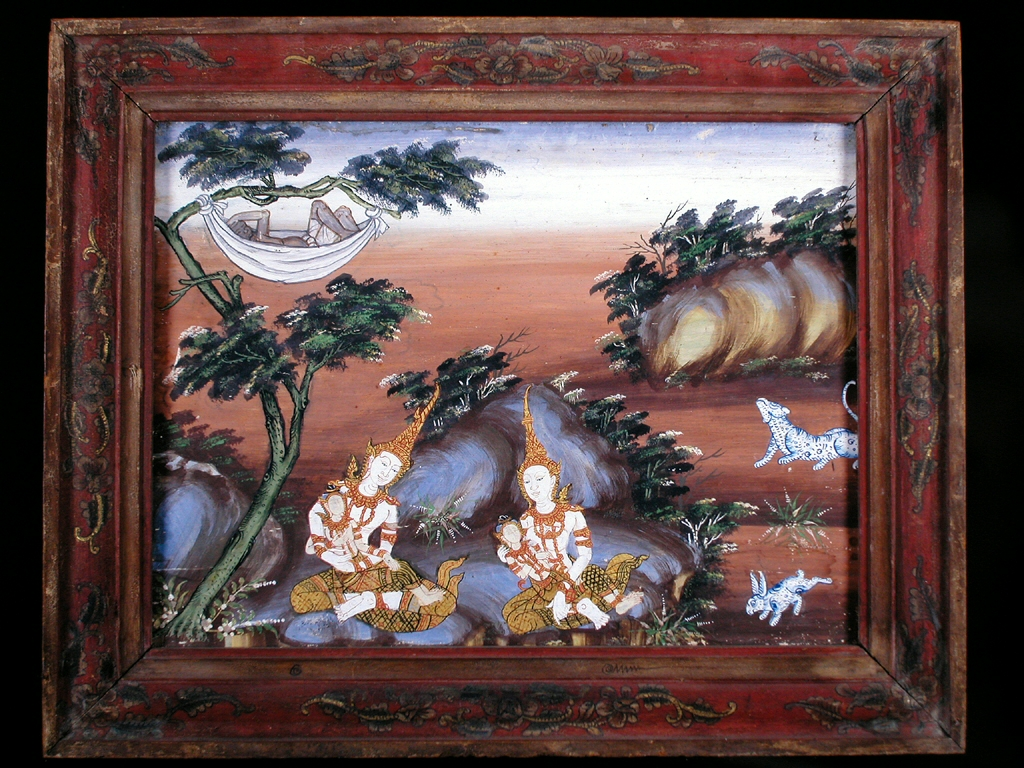
In Chapter 11, the children are cared for while Jujaka sleeps. This painting is from the 19th century, Thailand. In the collection of the Walters Art Museum

From that day onwards Amittada refused to go to the well any longer. She pushed Jujaka telling him to find her some servants in order to spare her more ridicule. She did not give her husband any peace.

Jujaka met a forester guarding the entrance to the Vamka Mountain and tricked him by claiming that Vessantara's banishment had been revoked. He met a hermit and tricked him as well. Finally, the brahmin Jujaka went to the forest to prince Vessantara while his wife Madri was away. He asked him for his two children, which Vessantara readily gave away. Jali and Kanha went to hide in a lotus pond. Their father found them and asked if they would help their father achieve his highest goal, the attainment of Buddhahood a future life. Both agreed and became Jujaka's servants. Vessantara told the brahmin to bring the children to their grandfather, saying, "The king will reward you for bringing his beloved grandchildren back to him". Jujaka disagreed, stating the Sunjaya would execute him instead. The brahmin tied both children with vines and dragged them like cattle. Both children begged their father to help them while the old man scolded and beat them with his stick. Vessantara could not stand this scene and reached for his weapon he kept in his hut. However, he overcame all anger and let his children be taken away.

Madri's return passage to their residence was blocked by tigers (actually deities in disguise). When she didn't see her children, she wandered around all night looking for them and finally collapsed before her husband. Vessantara thought she was dead so he lamented his loss. He put her head on his lap and realised that she was still breathing. He revived Madri with water. She woke up and rose immediately to keep a distance appropriate for her vow of celibacy. Vessantara told her what had happened. After Madri learnt that her husband gave away their children, she praised him for his greatness.

Fearing that Vessantara would give away his wife as well, the deity Śakra intervened and in disguise, asked for his wife Madri, who Vessantara readily gave him. Then Indra gave Madri back to Vessantara as a trust, for all his acts of benevolence and generosity had been perfect.

=== Return to Sivi ===
Two deities felt sympathy for the young prince and princess. They disguised themselves as their parents and helped nurse Jali and Kanha. They made Jujaka take a wrong turn and led him to into Sivi Kingdom and through the palace gate. King Sanjaya saw the two familiar faces and ordered royal guards to bring them to him. He recognized his grandchildren and paid for their price. Kanha's price was higher than her brother's, as her father wanted no-one to buy her from Jujaka. In fact, both Jali and Kanha's prices were so high that only king Sanjaya could have bought them.

Jujaka became extremely rich. At his first meal as a rich man, he ate too much. His digestive system failed and he fell dead upon his plate. King Sanjaya sent his men to find Jujaka's family to seize the latter's wealth; however, his wife and in-laws were afraid of the punishment for Jujaka's treason, so they fled.

Sanjaya arranged a grand procession to meet his son and daughter-in-law. The Kingdom of Kalinga also returned the white elephant, now that Kalinga had become prosperous again. This abated the anger of the people of Sivi. Jali led the army and civilians to his parents' residence and the family was reunited. After the most happy moment, all six of them collapsed.

The red rain poured down from Heaven to revive the family. This rain "soaks those who want to be soaked, but will not fall on those who want to stay dry." Vessantara was crowned as king again and returned to his kingdom. Indra blessed the Sivi Kingdom with a rain of gems. Vessantara allowed people to keep those gems for themselves and the leftovers went into the Kingdom treasury, which he used for his charity. His treasure never ran out.

Buddha explained that each person had been reborn in the time of the Buddha as people surrounding the Buddha's person. His parents used to be Vessantara's parents. Madri was now reborn as the Buddha's former wife. Jali became Rahula, the Buddha's son. Kanha became Upalavanna, the bhikkhuni (nun). The loyal courtier who informed him of the place he should stay became Ananda, his now cousin and attendant. Jujaka became Devadatta, his now arch enemy. The white elephant became Maha Kassapa.

== Culture and art ==
Vessantara Festival
- Also called: Boun Pha Vet (in Laos); Medin Full Moon Poya (in Sri Lanka); Thet Mahachat (in Thailand)
- Observed by: Thais, Lao, Sri Lankans, Cambodians and Burmese
- Type: Buddhist
- Significance: Commemorates the Vessantara Jataka
- Date: Full moon day of the 12th lunar month

The Vessantara Jataka is celebrated in temples during a Buddhist festival known as Thet Mahachat (Thai: เทศน์มหาชาติ), from Maha Jati or "Great Birth", in Central Thailand, Boun Pha Vet in Laos and as Bun Phawet (Bun Phra Wes), Bun Duan Sii ('Merit-making of the fourth month') or Thet Phawet in Isan. It is also an important celebration in Cambodia, Burma and Sri Lanka.

In Sri Lanka, verses of lament from the text Vessantara Kāvya are often recited at the corpse of a relative who just died, especially the verses of Madri mourning the loss of her children. This text was composed in Sri Lanka in the early modern period by a secular poet, and emphasizes abandonment and emotional desolation. The themes were very popular among the ordinary people, though the emphasis was very different than the earlier Buddhist texts.

The Thet Mahachat is very popular both in rural and urban communities, often with dance and drama performances, as well as festive parades and processions through the towns. During this Buddhist festival the monks give a sermon about the entire text of the Vessantara Jataka, accompanied by rituals and cultural performances. Because of its central role in the Thet Mahachat or Boun Pha Vet celebrations, the Vessantara Jataka is an important part of the traditional folklore in many areas of the Southeast Asian region. Some of the scenes, especially the mismatched couple formed by Jujaka, the old Brahmin, and his young wife Amittada, are attractive for the public during the festival. While it has lost its traditional importance in some areas, in others it has gained in popularity.

Scenes of the Vessantara Jataka are found depicted on the walls of Buddhist temples throughout Southeast Asia. They are also engraved on the murals of Angkor Wat, Cambodia, and depicted in ancient patterns on ikat silk cloth.

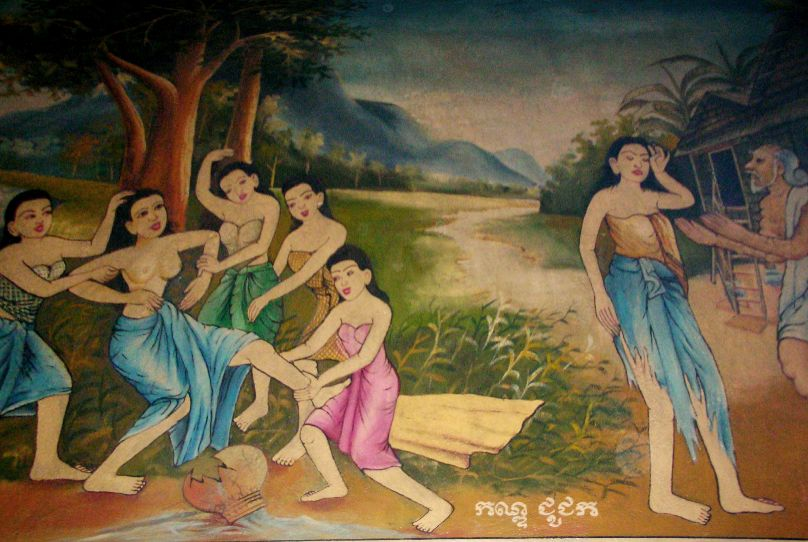
Vessantara Jātaka mural; The girl Amittada is beaten up by the village girls, humiliated she goes to complain to her old Brahmin husband. Wat Phnom, Phnom Penh, Cambodia

== Role in legitimizing kingship ==
In the last seven centuries in Thailand, the Vessantara Jātaka has played a significant role in legitimating kingship in Thailand, through the Great Birth festival. Merit-making and paramis were greatly emphasized in this festival, through the story about Prince Vessantara's generosity. Initially, the festival was an important way for the Chakri dynasty to legitimate itself, as Vessantara was the model prince who became king through the power of his merits and sacrifice. During the reform period of Rama IV, however, as Thai Buddhism was being modernized, the festival was dismissed as not reflecting true Buddhism. Its popularity has greatly diminished ever since. Nevertheless, the use of merit-making by the Thai monarchy and government to solidify their position and create unity in society has continued until at least the late twentieth century.

== Depiction of brahmins ==
Jūjaka plays an important role in the Vessantara story. Depicted as lustful, cruel and a coward, his very name implies decrepitude. These kind of depictions of brahmins are typical for Buddhist popular literature.

== Gallery ==
Vessantara jataka

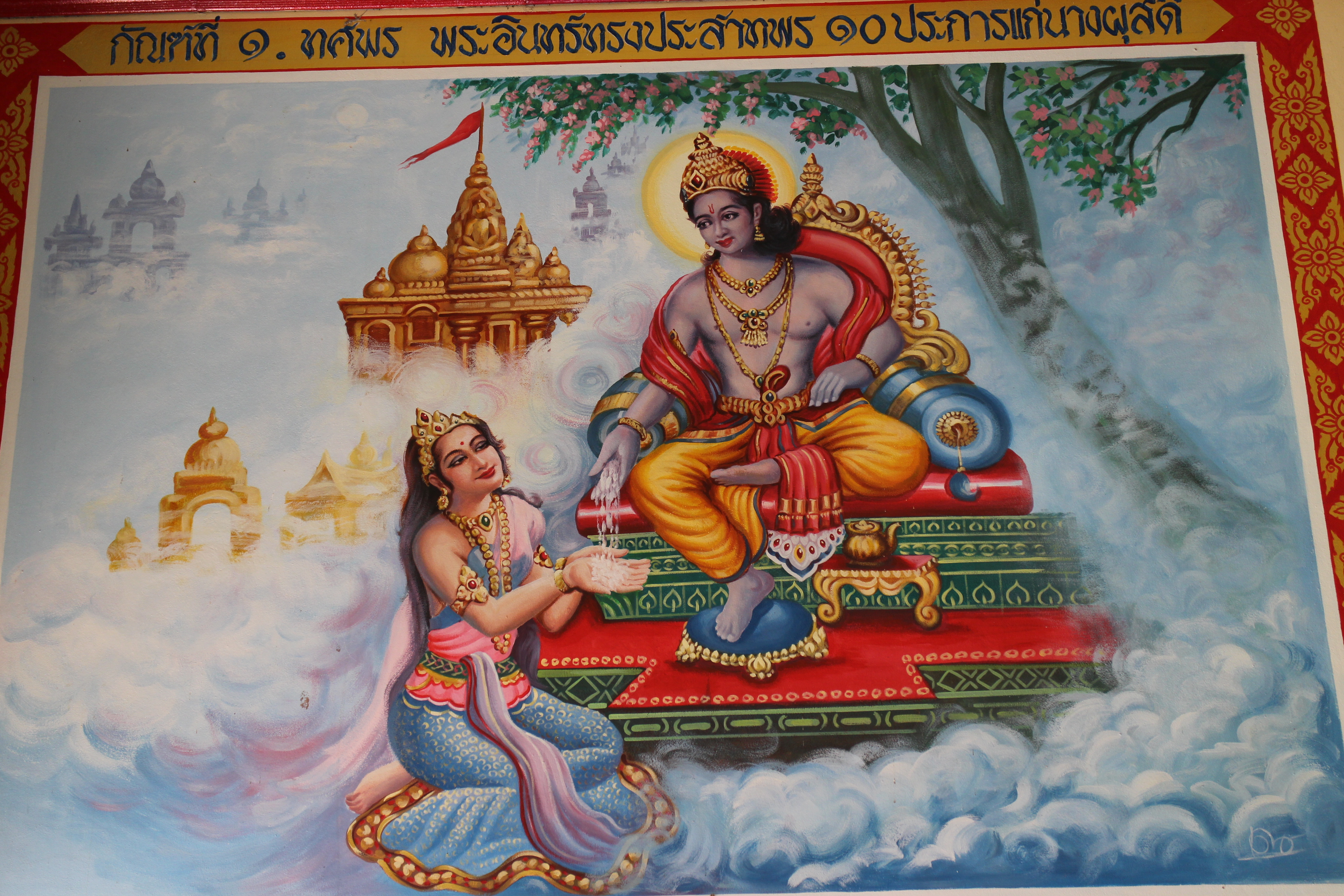
Lord Indra gives ten boons to Queen Phusati.

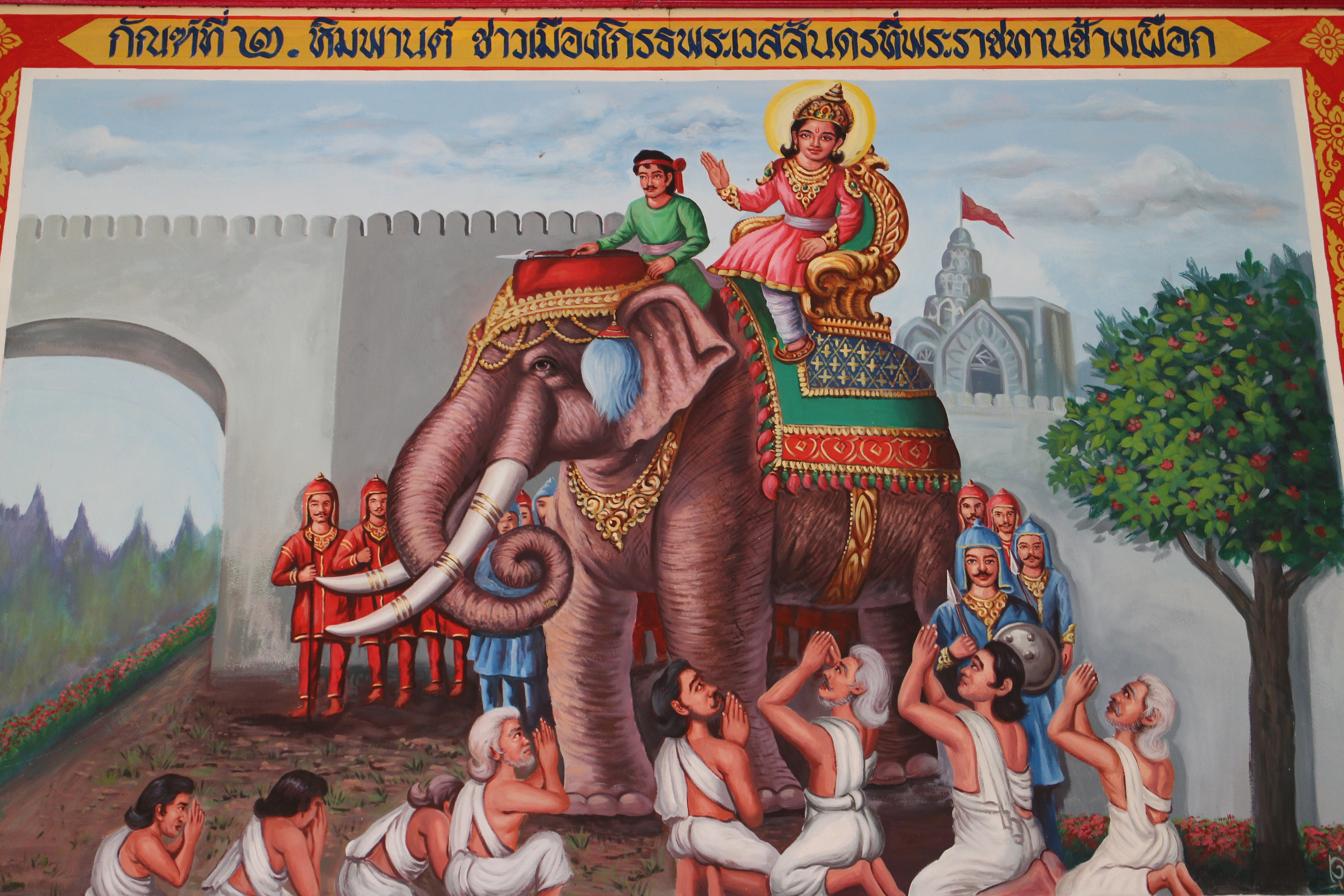
People are angry at Vessantara.

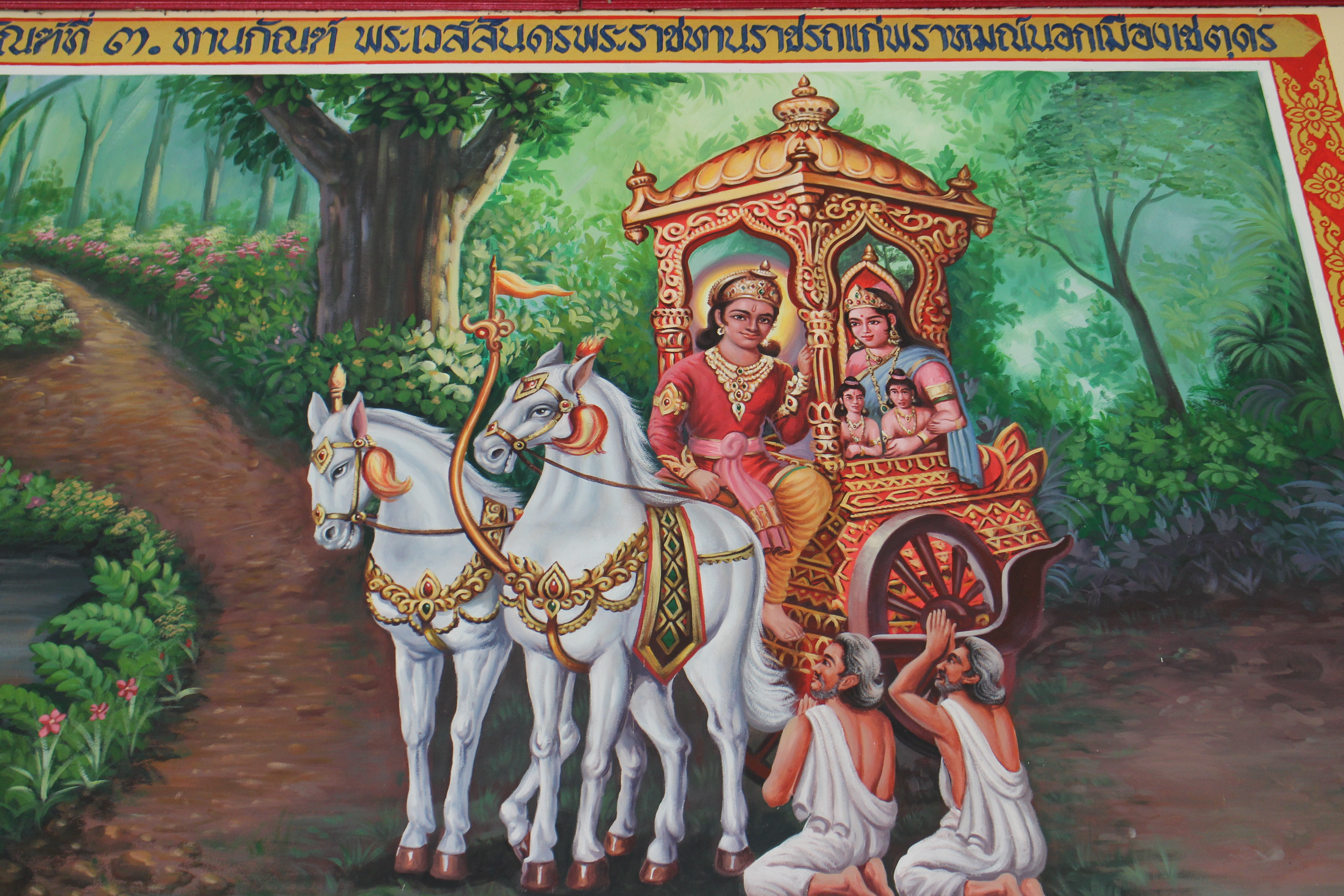
Vessantara gives away the cart to a brahmin.

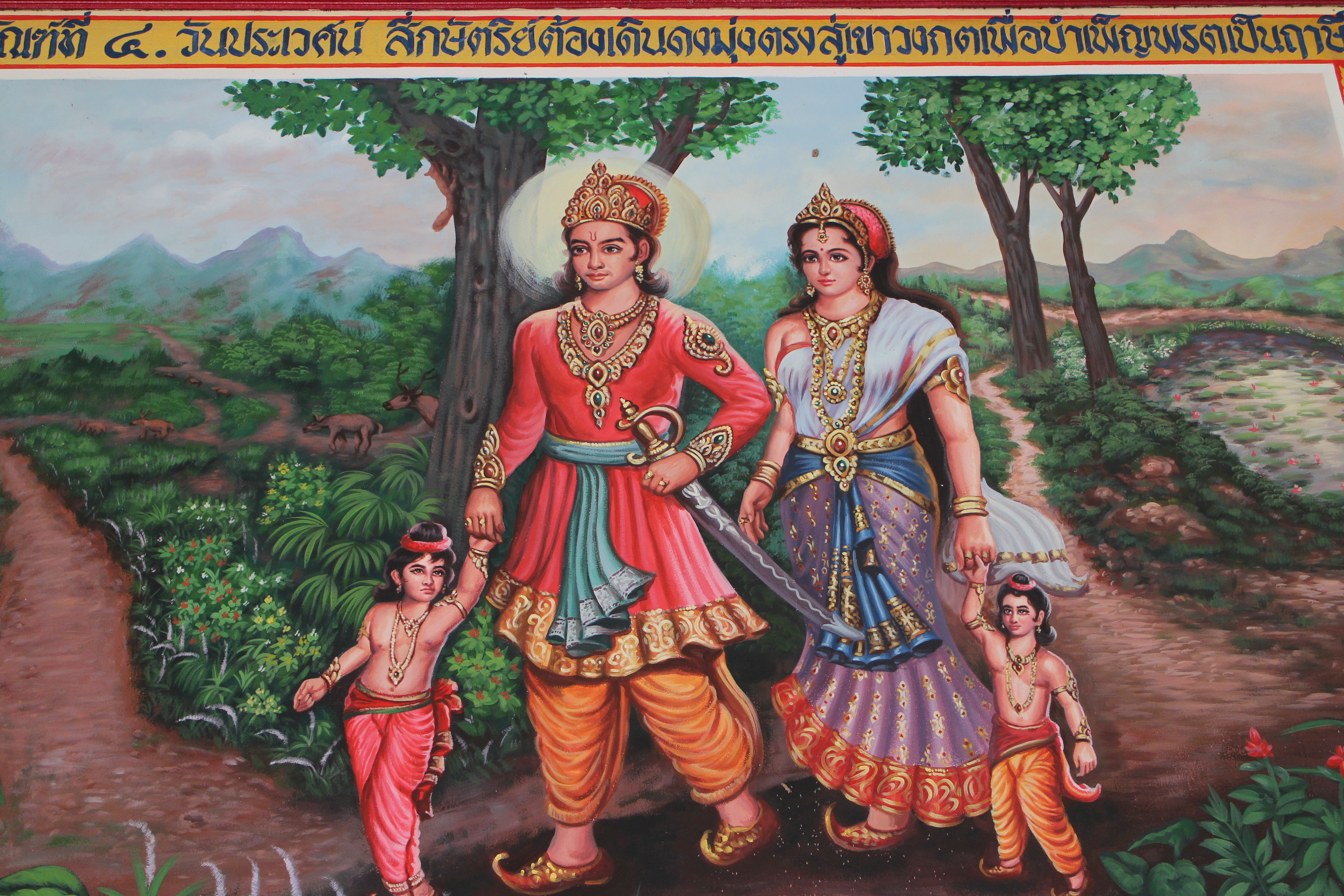
Vessantara goes into exile.

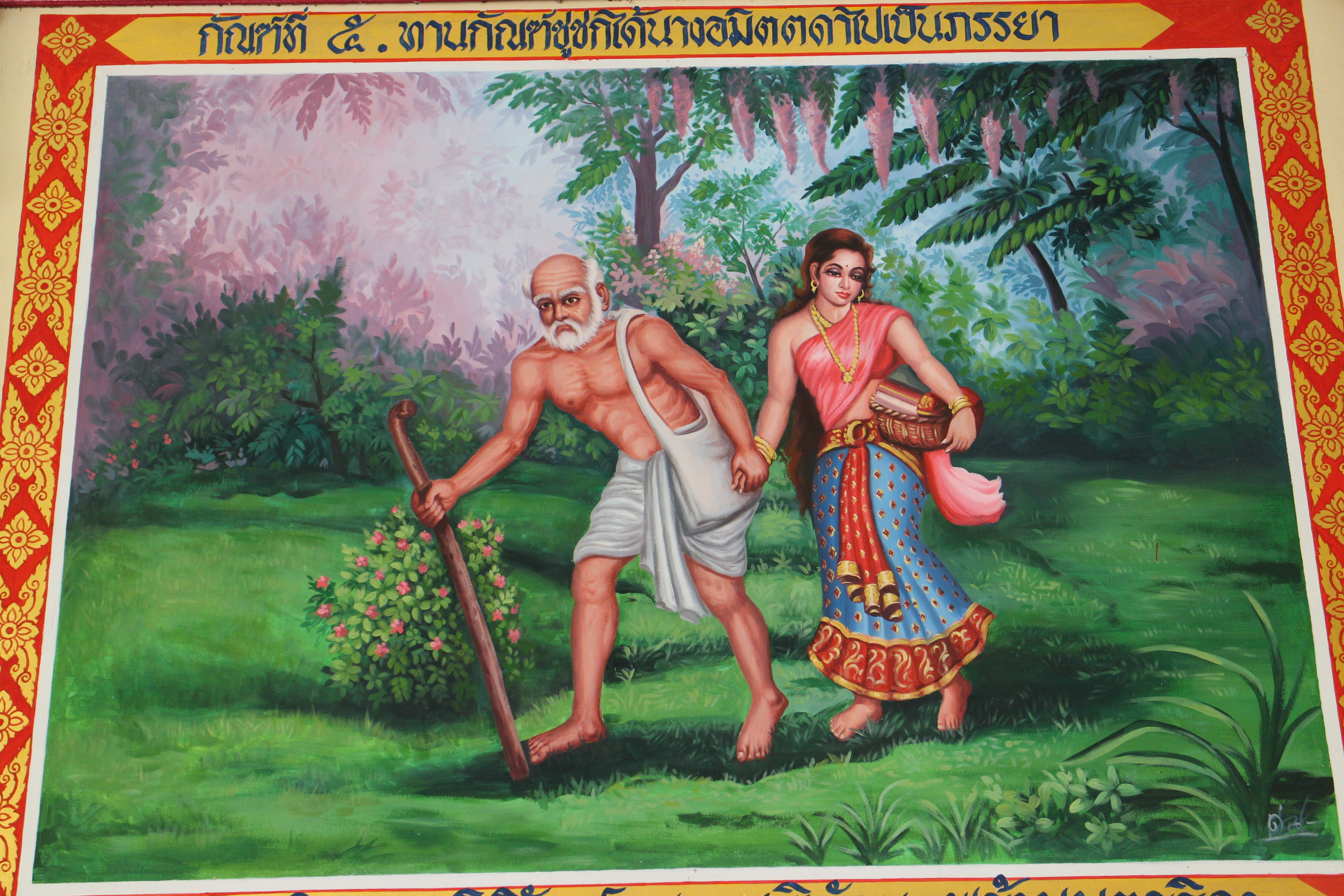
Jujaka with Amittada, his beautiful wife.

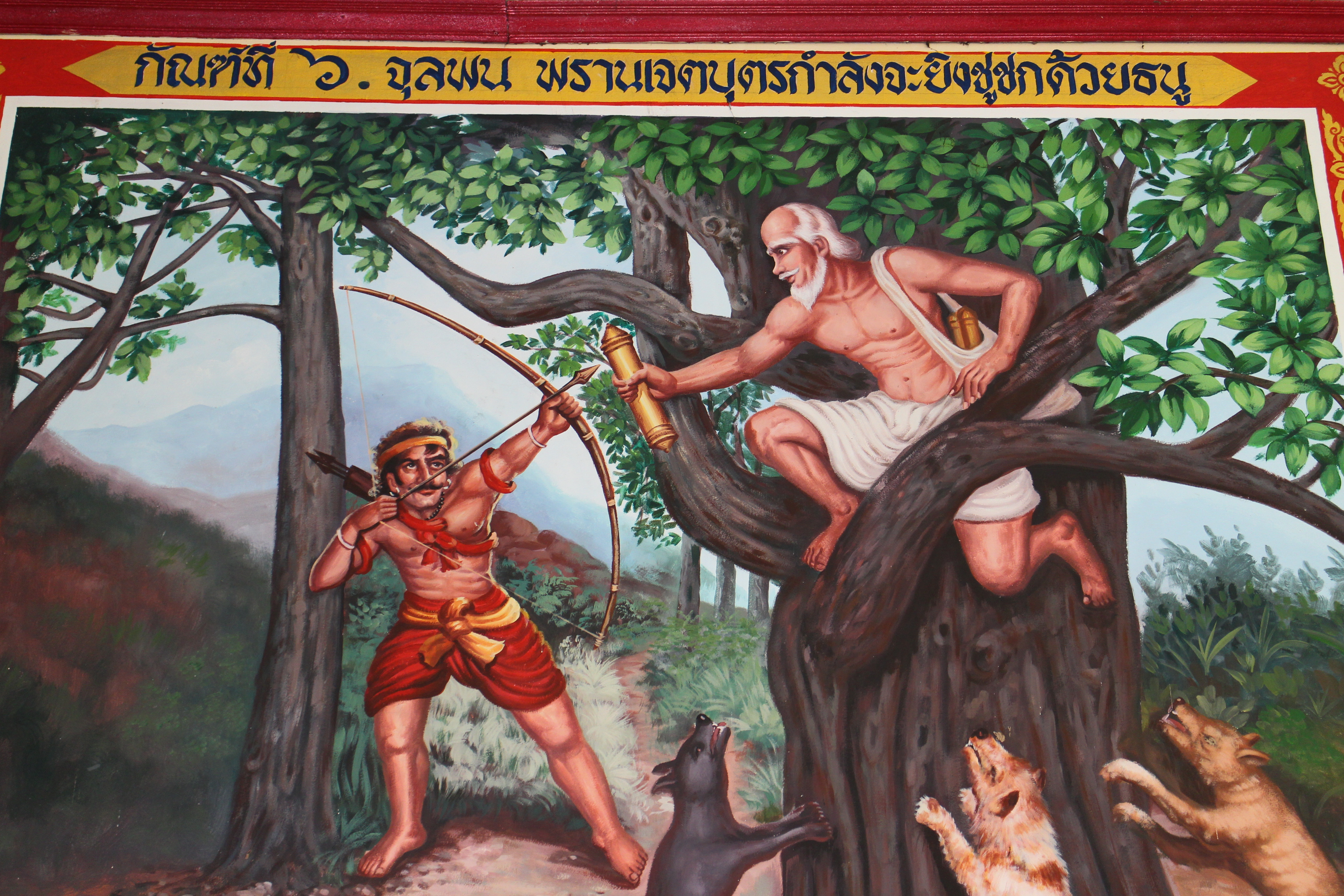
Hunter bent his bow, aimed at Jujaka.

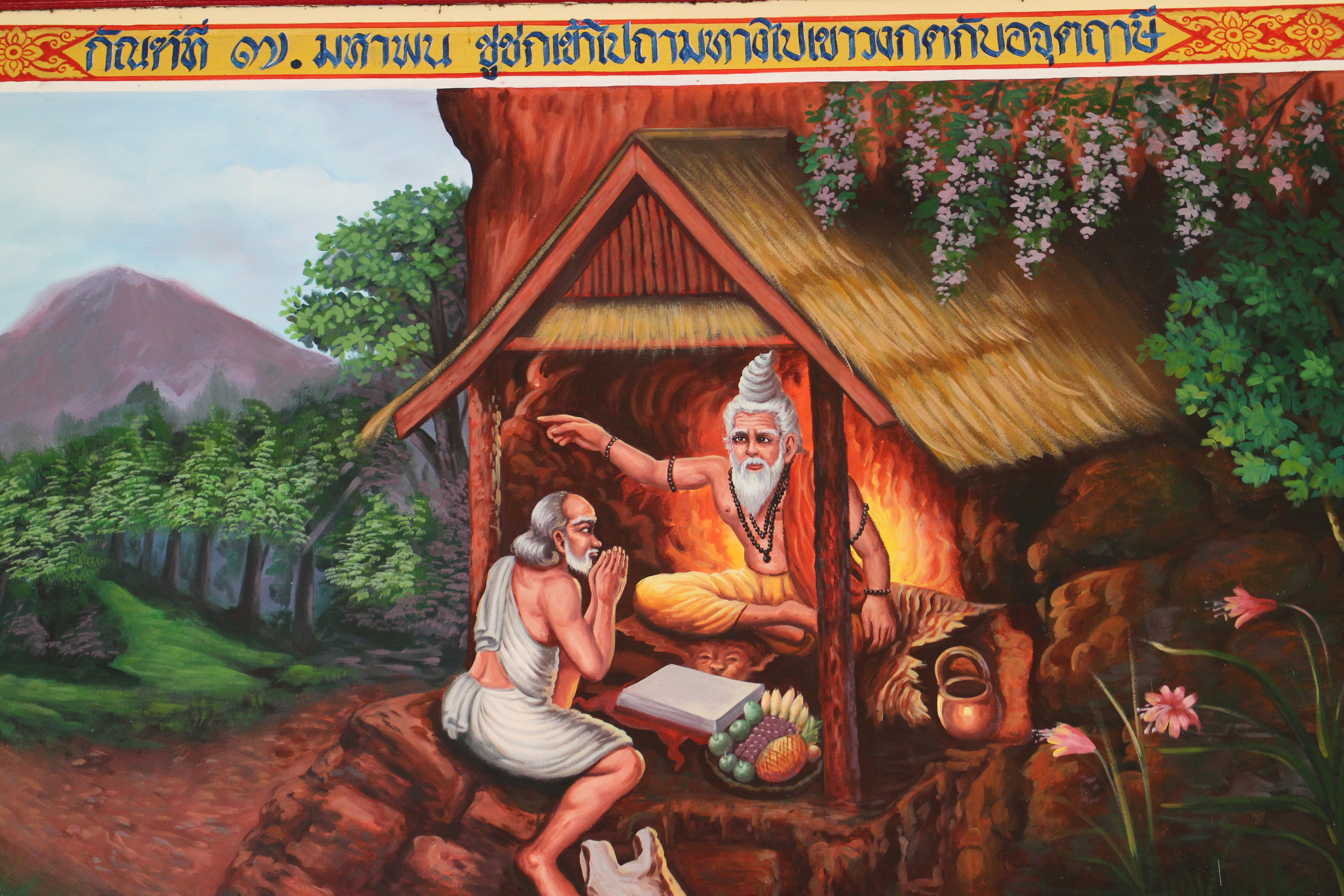
Jujaka asks the hermit for directions.

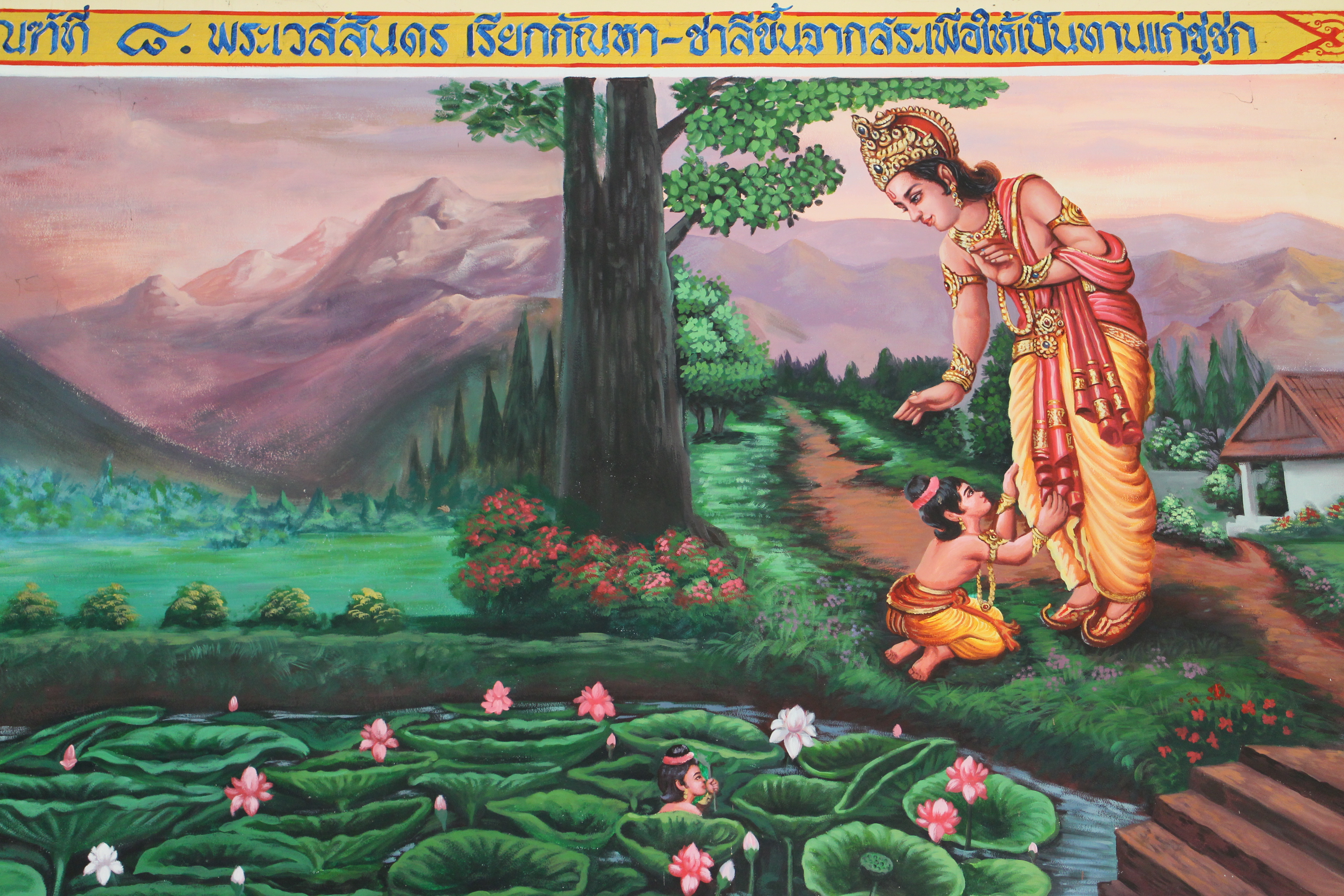
Vessantara asks his children to come out of the lotus pond.

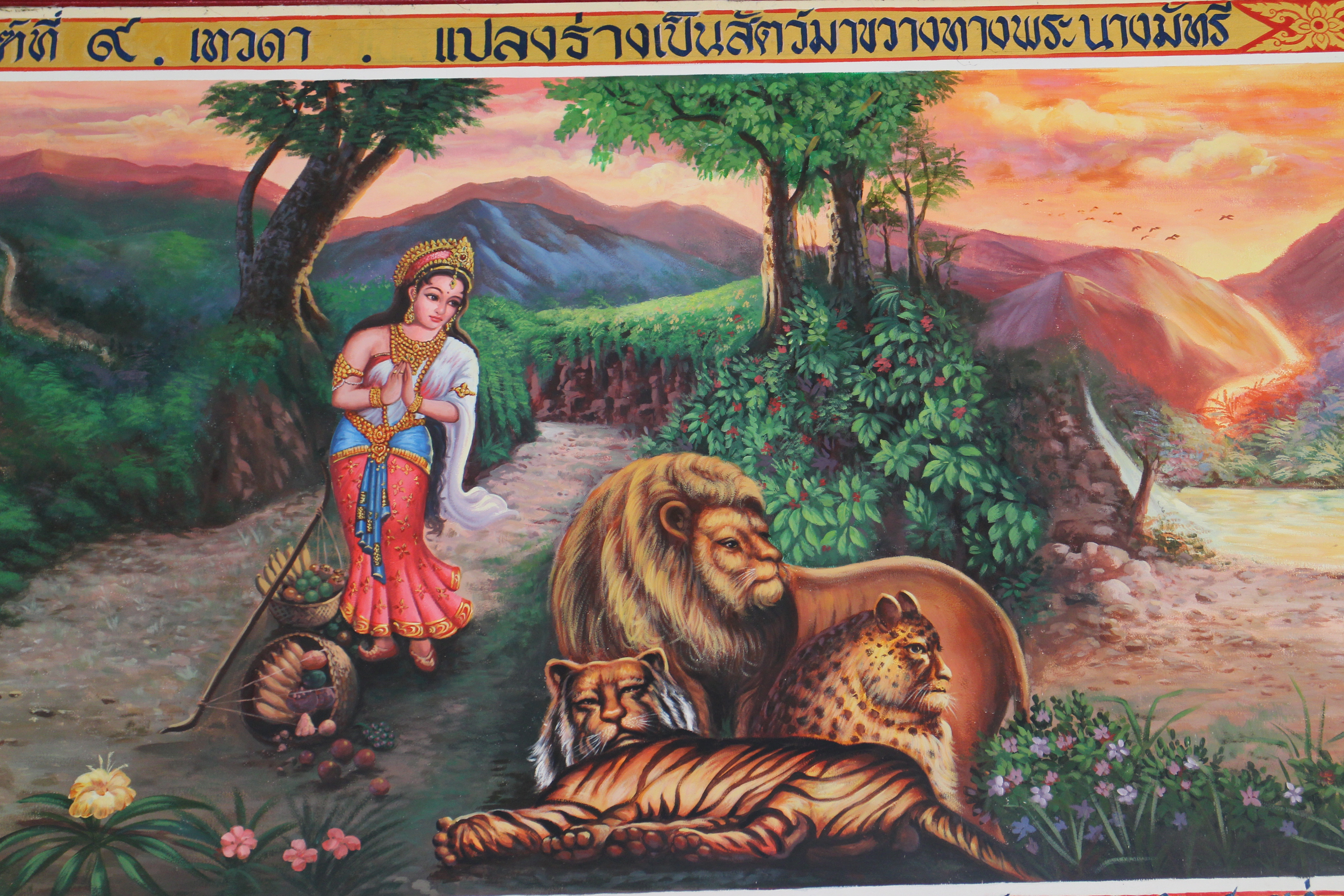
Wild animals bar the way for Madri.

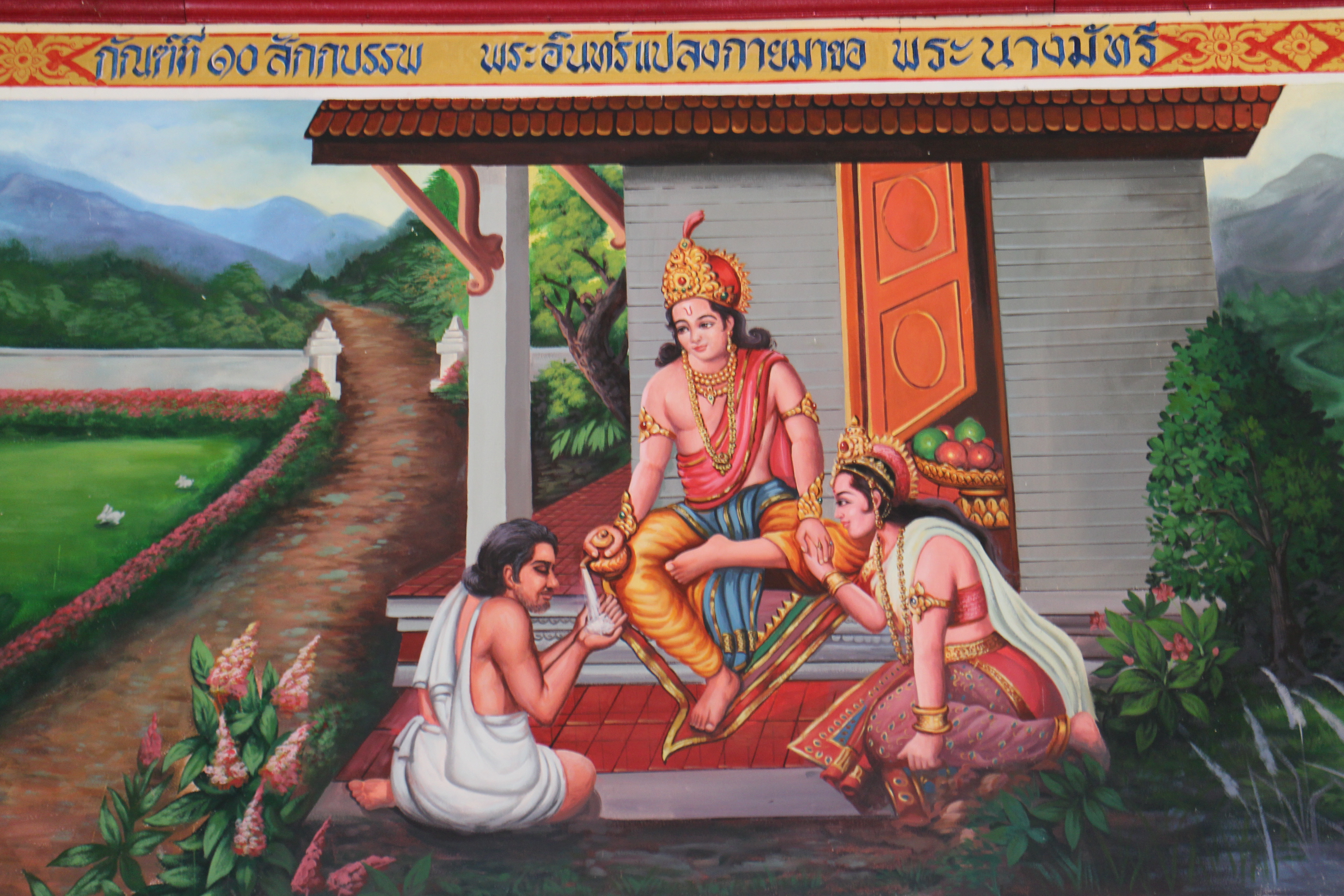
Indra asks Vessantara for his wife

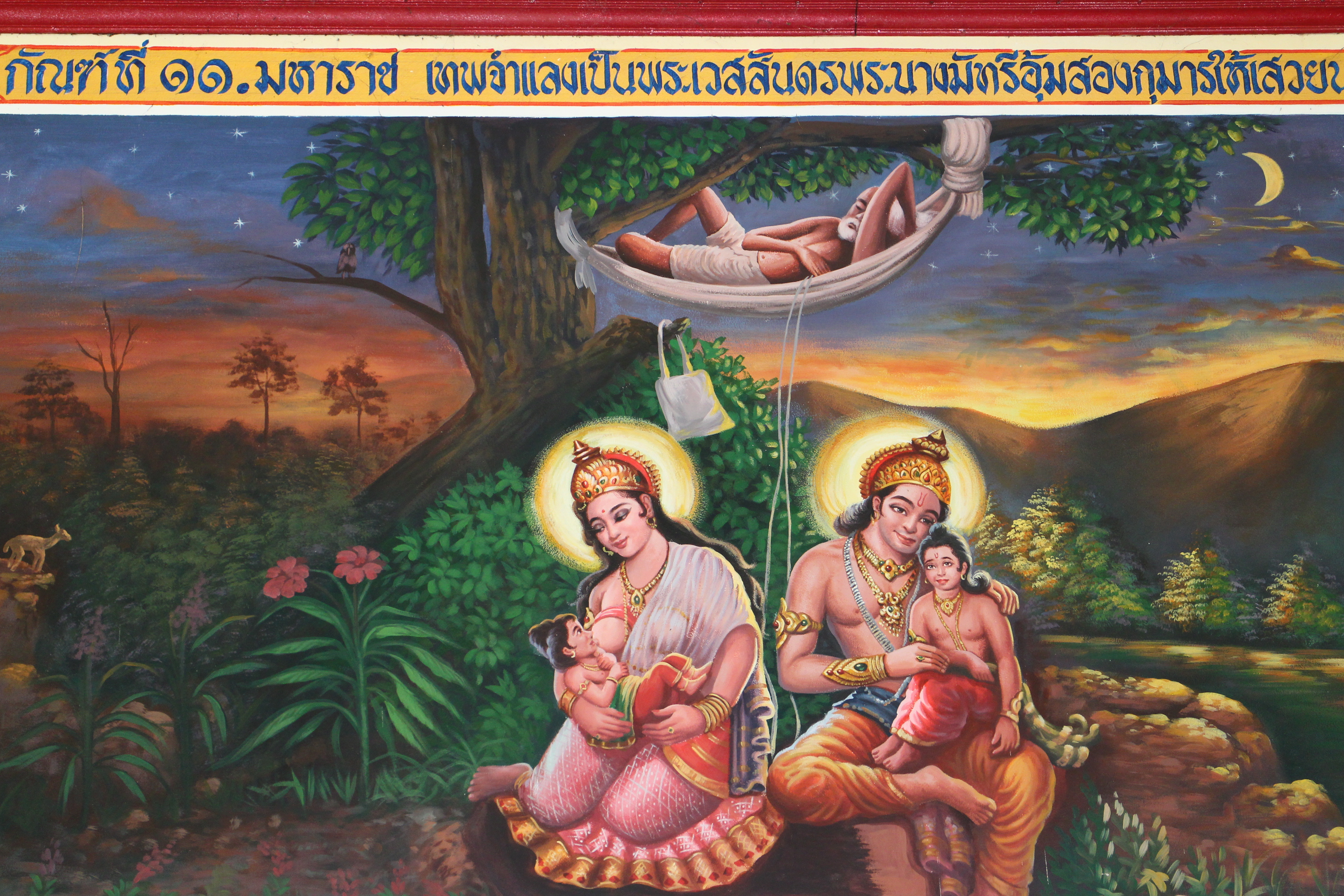
Devas take care of Vessantara's children.

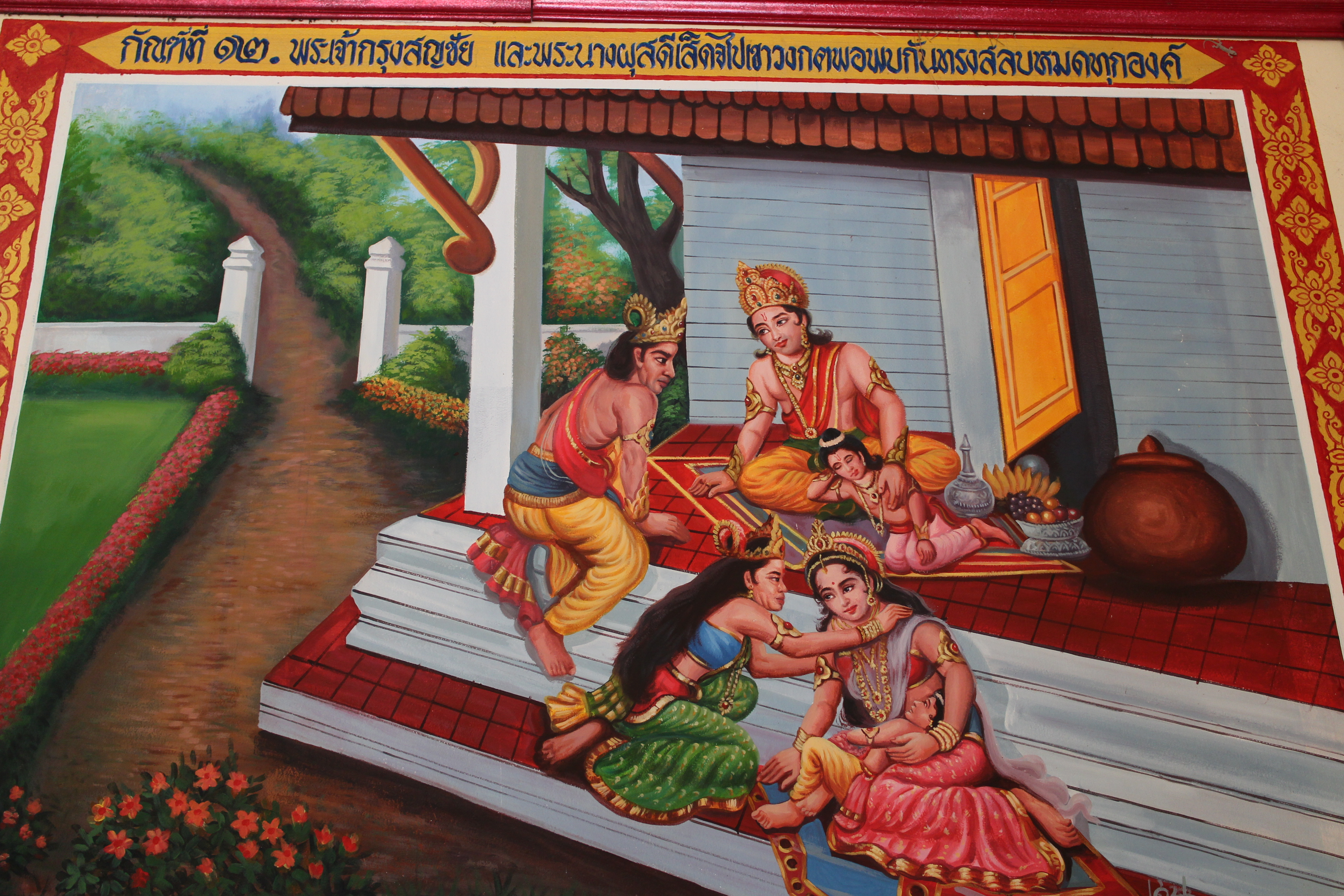
The royal family is reunited.

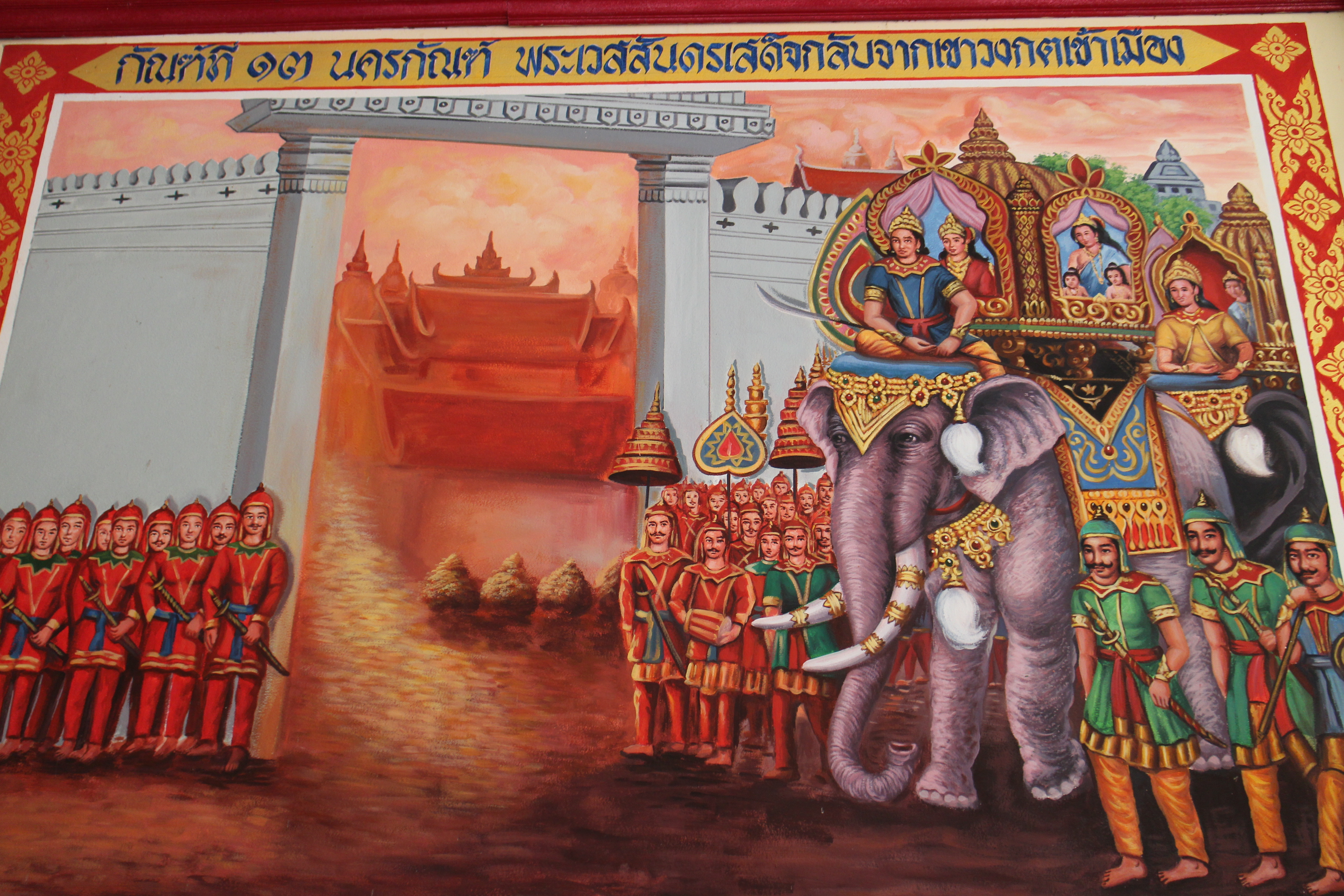
Vessantara is warmly welcomed.

Gallery photos of the murals from Three Bridges Temple (Thai: วัดสะพานสาม; RTGS: wat saphan sam), Phitsanulok, Thailand, 2015.

== See also ==
- Buddhist ethics
- Dana (Buddhism)
- Merit (Buddhism)
- Transfer of merit
- Phi Ta Khon
- Buddhism in Thailand
- Mahanipata Jataka
- Paññāsa Jātaka
- List of Jatakas
- Jātaka (Pali Canon)
