= Garuda's abduction of Queen Kakati =

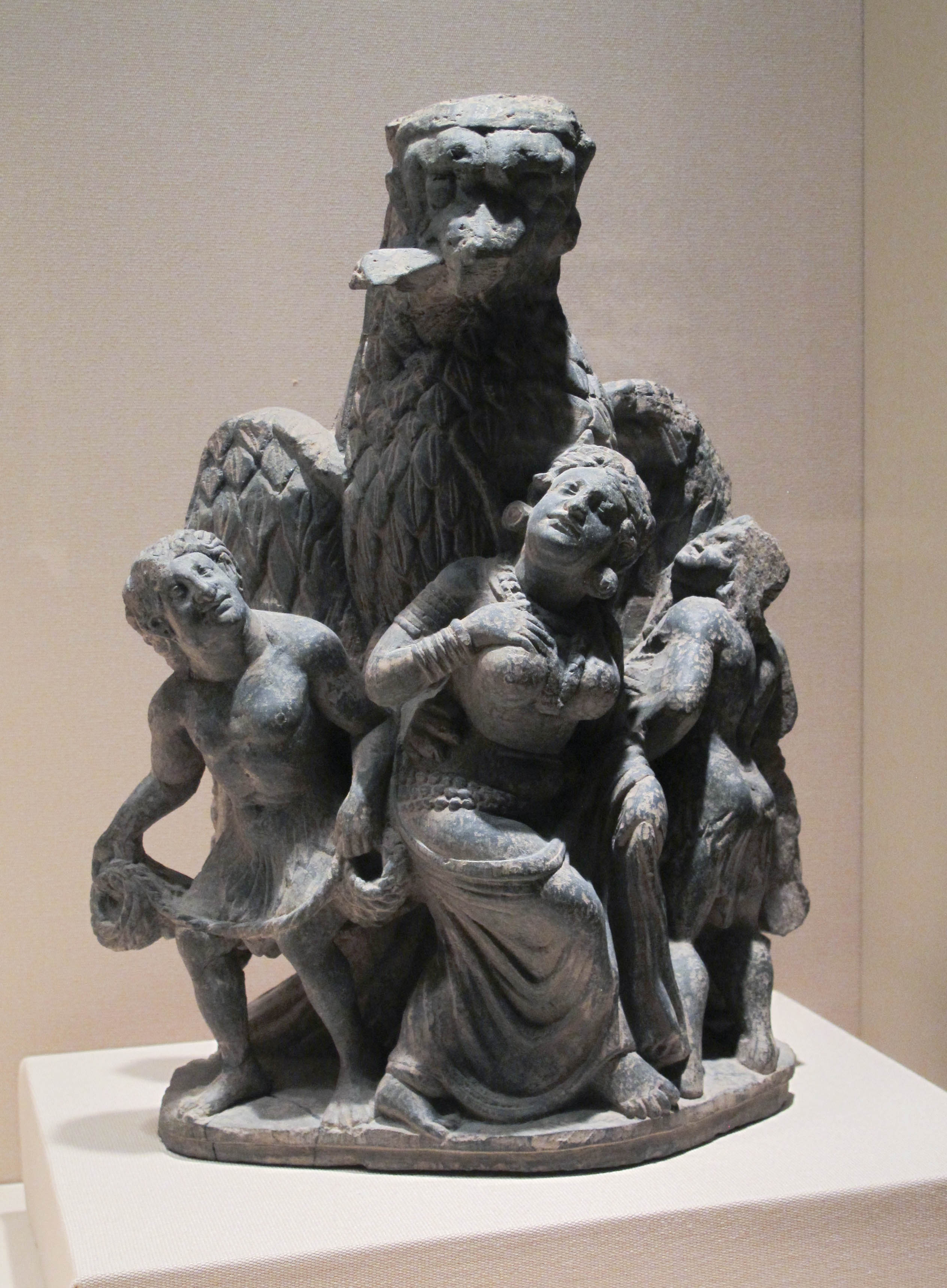
Garuda's abduction of Queen Kakati. Greco-Buddhist art or Gandhara.

Garuda's abduction of Queen Kakati is a famous Buddhist tale about the former lives of the Buddha, called a Jataka.

In this story, the Buddha was born in a previous life as the king of Benares, and therefore was still a Bodhisattva, and ruled with his beloved queen, Kakati. The royal solar bird Garuda came to the court disguised as a man and gambled with the king. He then became enamored of the queen and abducted her. He carried her off to his nest by the Simbali-Lake and there lived with her.

When Garuda heard of the king's great sadness and of his true love for Kakati, he restored her to him.

The story is one of those related by the bird Kunala, in the kunala Jataka. The story is also very close to that of the Sussondi Jataka.

According to Buddhist mythology, the Garudas were enemies to the nāga, a race of intelligent serpents, whom they hunt. The Garudas at one time caught the nāgas by seizing them by their heads; but the nāgas learned that by swallowing large stones, they could make themselves too heavy to be carried by the Garudas, wearing them out and killing them from exhaustion. This secret was divulged to one of the Garudas by the ascetic Karambiya, who taught him how to seize a nāga by the tail and force him to vomit up his stone (Pandara Jātaka, J.518).

Garuda in the Greco-Buddhist art of Gandhara
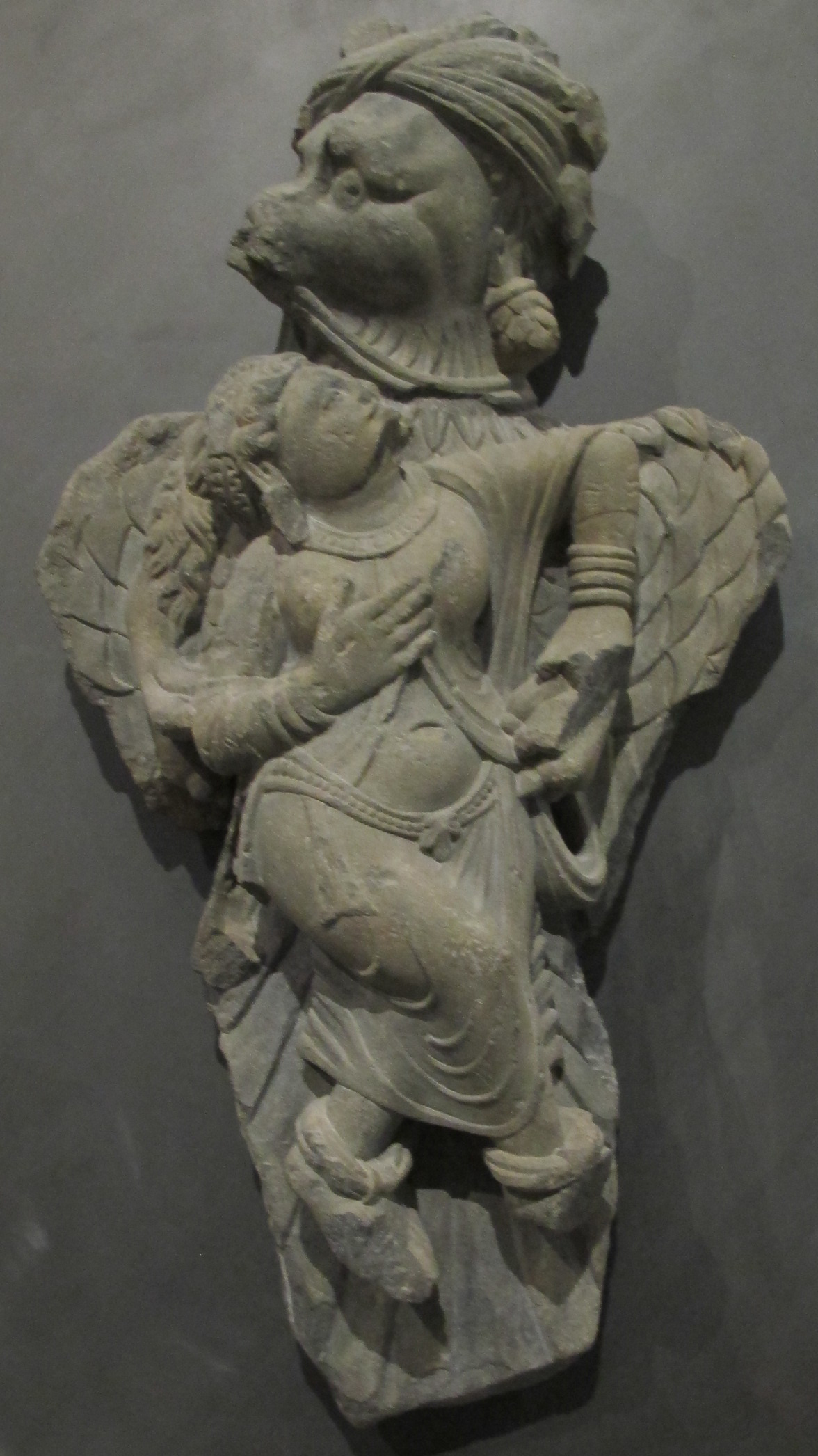
Garuda's abduction of Queen Kakati. Greco-Buddhist art or Gandhara. 200-400 CE.

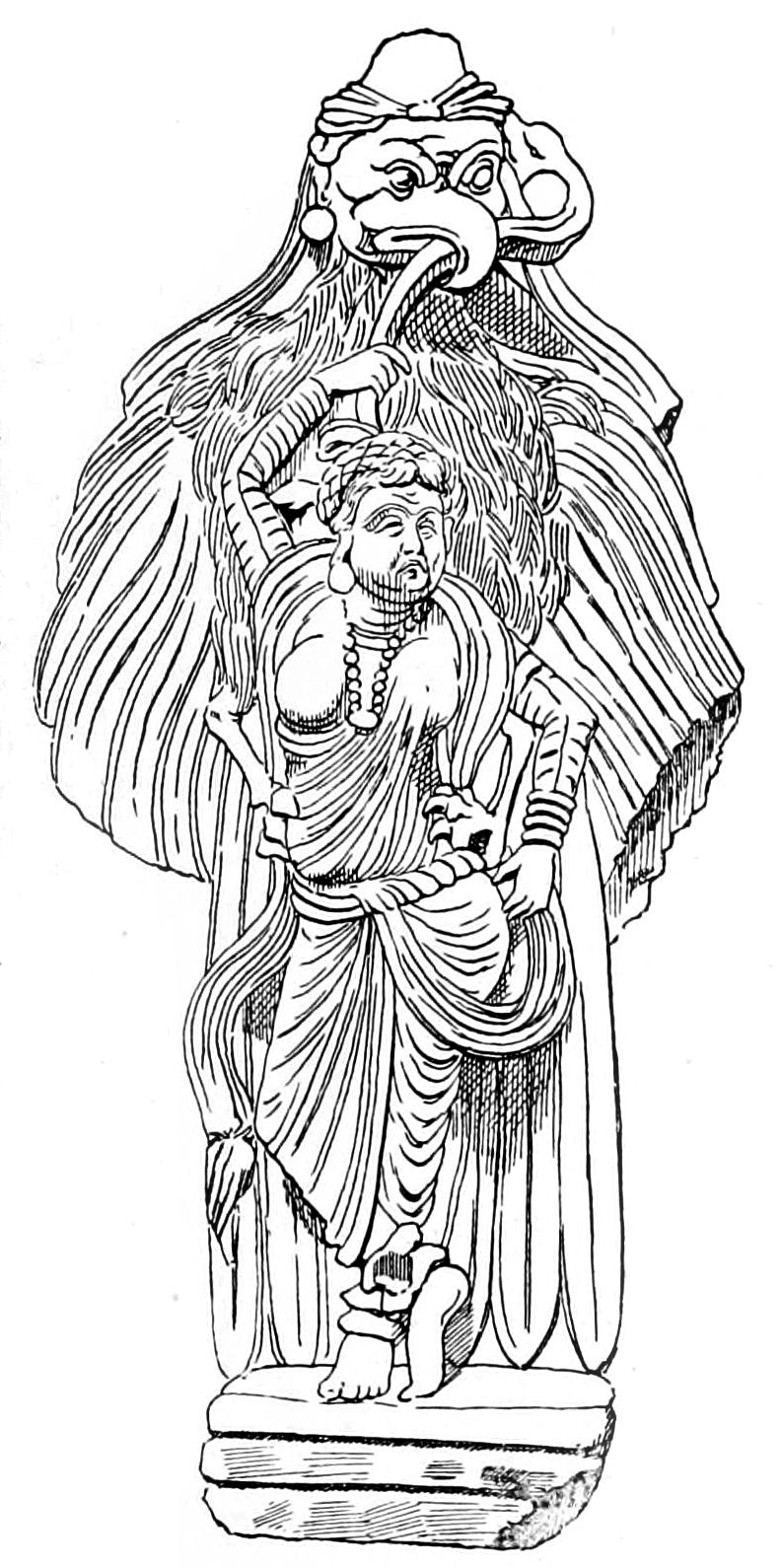
Garuda relief Gandhara.

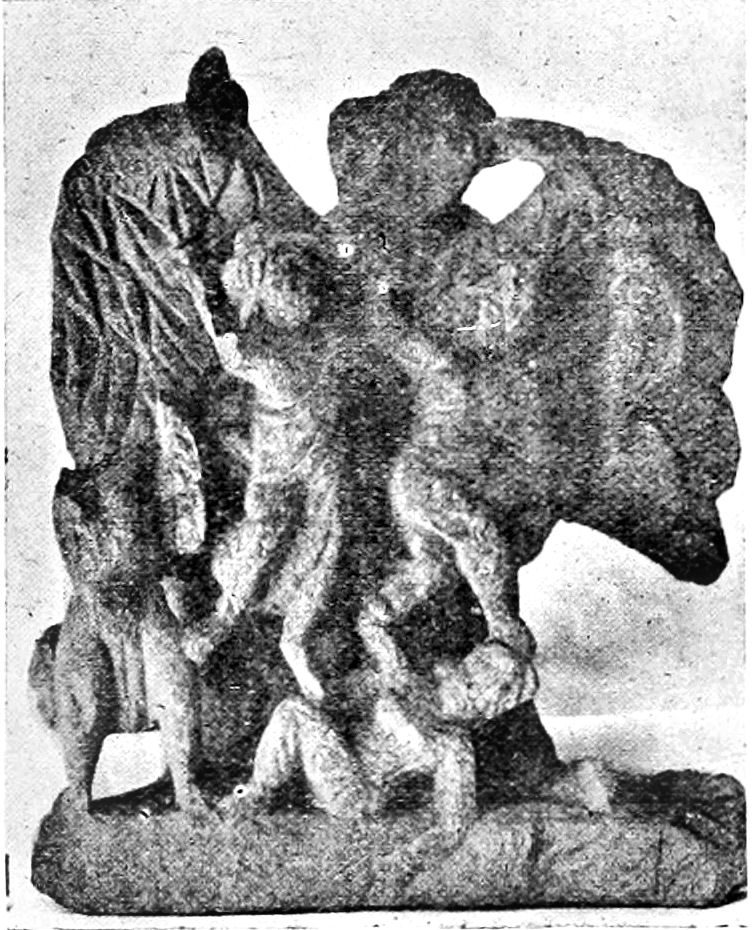
Garuda carrying off Naga youths.
