= Wat Photharam, Maha Sarakham =

Buddhist temple in Maha Sarakham province, Thailand

Coordinates: 15°39′37.08″N 103°14′58.56″E

Wat Photharam
- วัดโพธาราม
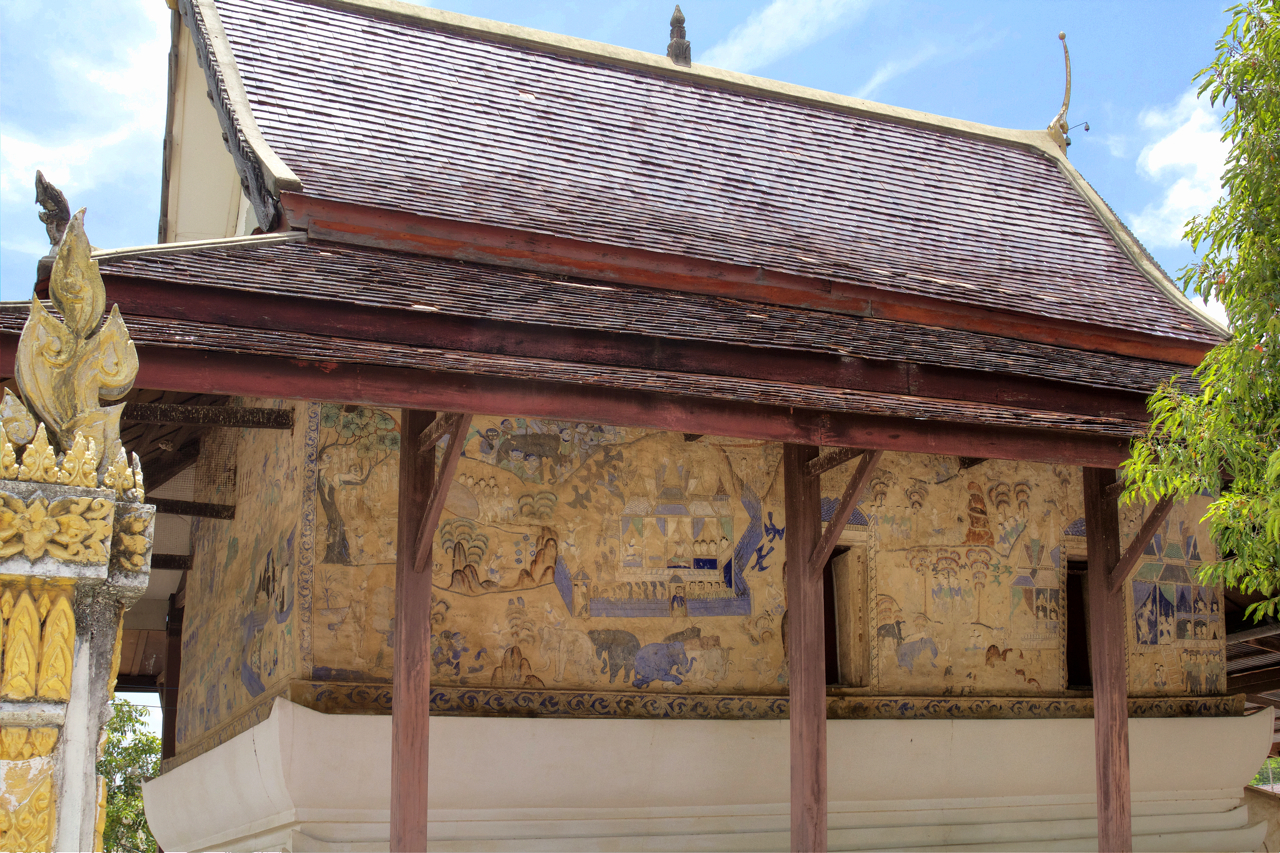
- Sim and Hup Taem of the temple

- Location within Thailand

Religion
- Affiliation: Buddhism
- Sect: Theravāda, Mahā Nikāya

Location
- Location: Mu 5 Ban Dong Bang, Dong Bang, Na Dun, Maha Sarakham, Thailand
- Country: Thailand
- Interactive map of Wat Photharam

Architecture
- Founder: Laotian immigrants

Wat Photharam (Thai: วัดโพธาราม) is an ancient temple in Ban Dong Bang, Dong Bang Sub-district, Na Dun District, Maha Sarakham Province, Isan region (northeastern) of Thailand.

The temple dates back to the first half of the 19th century, during the reign of King Rama III. It is situated in an old town zone called Ban Dong Bang. Previously, it was called 'Wat Pho Thong' (วัดโพธิ์ทอง) and renamed to 'Wat Photharam' in 1942 by the fourth abbot, Phra Kru Chan Di.

The temple is known for its hup taem (ฮูปแต้ม) murals on the sim (สิม). The sim, the Isan word for the main hall of the temple, features the story of Sinxay, an epic poem of both Laos and Isan people. It was drawn with a process called 'hup taem' (mural painting in Isan).

Typically, according to all the ancient temples in the Isan, mural paintings, Buddha images, pulpits, and stucco designs of the temples in the Isan in the past are exquisite with the unique Isan art style. This began with the Lan Xang art then Isan art by Chinese and Annamese artisans and has continued to the near present, which is a period that the temples in the Isan were generally determined to be built like those in Bangkok.

Wat Photharam is one example that clearly demonstrates this type of indigenous art alongside nearby temple Wat Pa Lelai.

The temple is registered as an ancient monument by the Fine Arts Department.
