= Hup taem =

Traditional style of Isan folk art

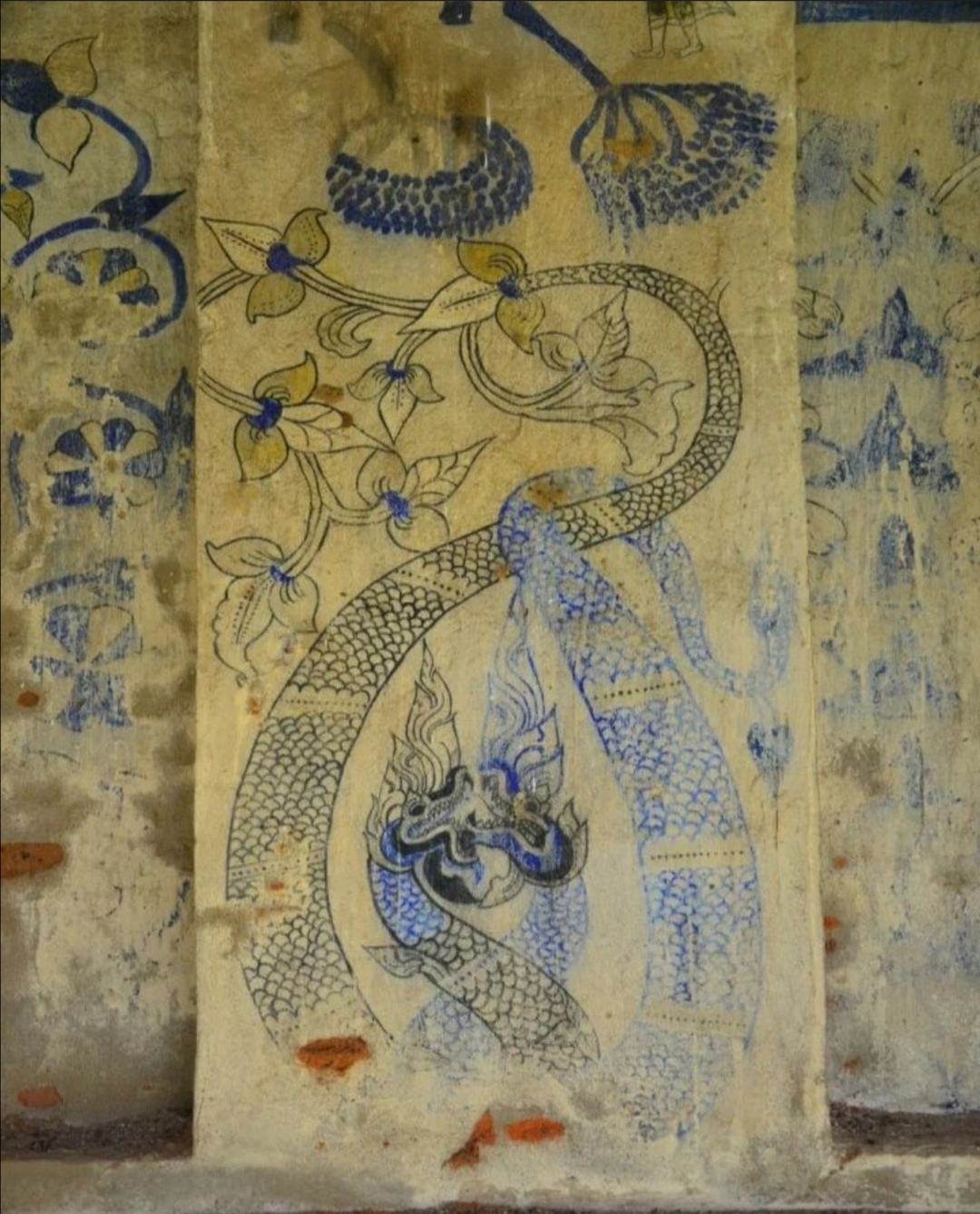
A portion of a hup taem mural on the sim at Wat Sanuan Wari Phatthanaram.

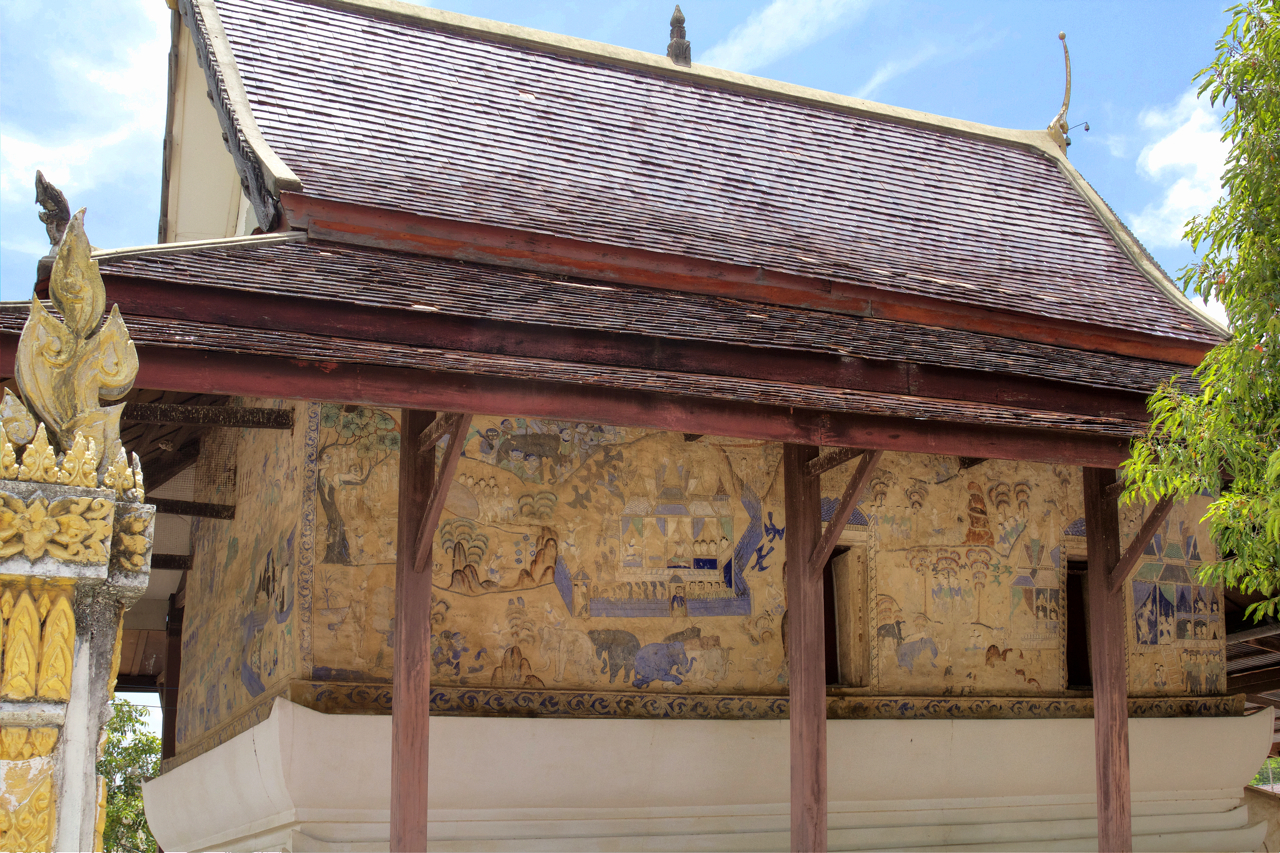
Hup taem on the exterior of the sim at Wat Photharam in Maha Sarakham.

Hup taem or hoop taem (Thai: ฮูปแต้ม, lit. 'picture painting') is an Isan folk art style of murals found on the ordination halls, or sim, at Buddhist temples. Some hup taem are influenced by traditional Thai and Lan Xang artistic conventions, but the Isan folk art style created by local artists called chang taem (ช่างแต้ม) features simple techniques with few elements. These hup taem murals are found mostly in Khon Kaen, Roi Et, and Maha Sarakham provinces in Northern Thailand.

== Etymology ==
Hup taem is literally translated as "picture painting" in Isan. In Isan, ฮูป (ḥūp) is analogous to the Thai รูป (rūp), meaning 'picture', while แต้ม (tæ̂m) means to daub or paint with colored paste.

== Style ==
Mural painting in the Isan region of northeastern Thailand has been three regional "schools" with the hup taem of the interior provinces of Khon Kaen, Maha Sarakham, Kalasin, and Roi Et reflecting the least degree of stylistic influence from other regions. As seen as Wat Sanuan Wari Phatthanaram in Khon Kaen, the region's hup taem tend to use a limited color palette against an off-white background and composition style that includes panels designed to be "read" as one moves around the building with short captions. The postures of the humans, gods, and beasts in the murals tends to follow shadow puppetry conventions with heroes shown mostly in profile and others shown full or three-quarter face. The murals also often include some bawdy scenes for entertainment and moral educational purposes. The brush strokes used in hup taem tend to be heavy and straightforward. The color palette typical relies upon blue, indigo, green, and brown pigments devised from locally available natural sources.

Since 1957, the style of hup taem have shifted away from the self-taught, "naïve" work of chang taem without formalistic artistic compositions, to more traditionally trained artists. Newer wat murals tend to follow images produced by a Bangkok-based religious publisher, So. Thammaphakdi & Sons. Efforts to document and preserve these traditional hup taem began in the 1980s by artist Pairote Samosorn (ไพโรจน์ สโมสร) and architect Wirot Srisuro (วิโรฒ ศรีสุโร). A survey of wat conducted by Pairote in 1989 identified 74 sites with hup taem murals. Fifteen of these had murals on both the exterior and interior of the sim. The survey also noted the folk art style of hup taem was most common in Khon Kaen, Maha Sarakham, and Roi Et, compared to hup taem along the Mekong River or near Ubon Ratchathani, which showed greater influence from other regions of Thailand or Laos.

== Themes ==
Although hup taem commonly depict traditional Buddhist texts, including the Vessantara Jātaka, Mahānipāta Jātaka, and other Jātaka tales; scenes from hell (naraka); and traditional epics like Phra Lak Phra Ram and Sang Sinxay. Images of local life and the community are often commonly depicted. They traditionally serve as a "dharma medium," conveying ideas, moral principles, and religious doctrine to viewers. In addition to helping to reinforce local, Isan identity, the hup taem are viewed as potential as an economic resource that can spur cultural tourism.

Some contemporary Thai artists are drawing inspiration from hup taem and incorporating patterns and concepts from folk murals into their work; for example, "The Adventure of Sinxay" mural exhibited at the Bangkok Art Biennale 2018, which was created by Hooptam Laos-Thai, a collective of artists from Isan and Laos.
