= Wat Sanuan Wari Phatthanaram =

Buddhist temple in Khon Kaen province, Thailand

Coordinates: 16.039613233411867°N 102.70433473998064°E

- วัดสนวนวารีพัฒนาราม
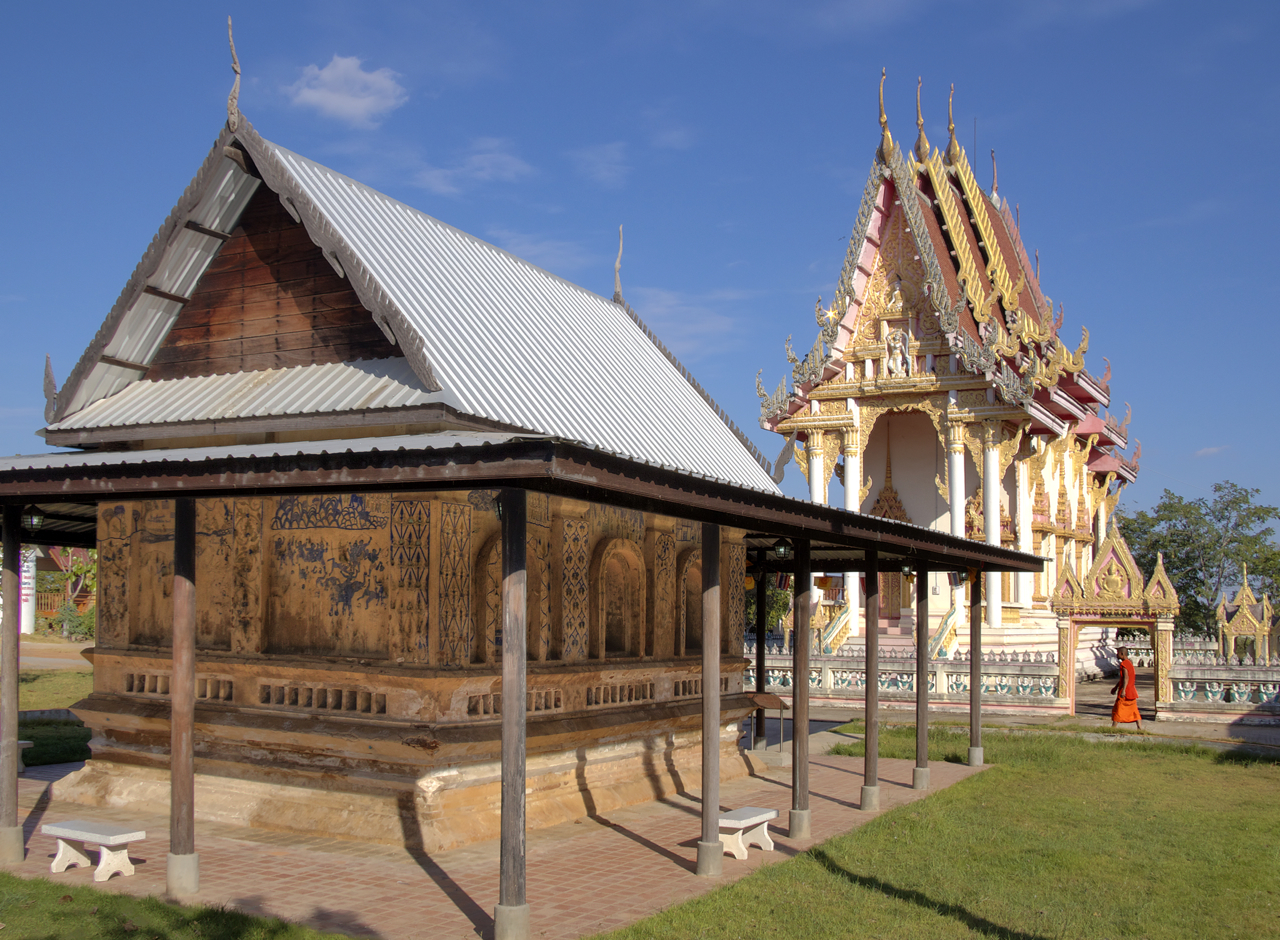
- The traditional sim is in the foreground with a newer, Bangkok-style wat in the background.

- Location within Thailand

Religion
- Affiliation: Buddhism
- Sect: Theravāda, Mahā Nikāya
- Region: Northern Thailand

Location
- Location: 87 Thanon Mittraphap, Hua Nong, Ban Phai, Khon Kaen
- Country: Thailand
- Interactive map of Wat Sanuan Wari Phatthanaram

Architecture
- Completed: 1926

Wat Sanuan Wari Phatthanaram (Note: In common use, the temple's name is often shortened to Wat Sanuan Wari. It is also referred to as Wat Ban Hua Nong (วัดบ้านหัวหนอง) after its location and, historically as Wat Chanuan (วัดชนวน), after a chanuan tree (Dalbergia nigrescens) growing at the site.) (Thai: วัดสนวนวารีพัฒนาราม) is a Mahā Nikāya Theravāda Buddhist temple, or wat, in Hua Nong, Khon Kaen, Thailand. Constructed in the early 1920s, is known for its Isan hup taem (ฮูปแต้ม, 'mural painting' in Isan) depicting scenes from the Vessantara Jātaka and Sang Sinxay decorating the ordination hall (สิม, sim). A more modern, Bangkok-style wat was constructed on the site in 1997, with the old sim remaining in place for tourists and private ceremonies. Despite its value as a work of local Isan culture, the old sim has received only minimal preservation and restoration work.

== History ==
Wat Sanuan Wari was established in 1922 and construction of its sim began after receiving a royal grant (วิสุงคามสีมา, wisungkhamsima) on 13 April 1923. The structure was completed in 1926. To support its construction, the local people raised ฿200 (equivalent to ฿24,192 in 2020). Around 2007, the original roof was replaced with a corrugated metal roof in same style as the original wooden roof.

The sim, which is made of bricks and plaster, has three rooms and measures 5 by 7.5 metres (16 ft × 25 ft). The east-facing front wall has a Vietnamese-style arched doorway. The west wall is solid, while the north and south wall feature semicircular arched windows. It was mostly likely designed by an ethnically Vietnamese craftsman named Chang Kaew (ช่างแกว), also known as ông Thông Pha, and it features a Vietnamese-style roof and arches. The stairs leading up about 1 metre (3.3 ft) into the sim feature stucco banisters shaped like nāga. In side the sim, against the west wall, is a Buddha statue the Māravijaya attitude produced by local craftsmen.

== Hup taem murals ==
The interior and exterior of the sim contain painted murals created by local artisans with powder paints in indigo, green, yellow, black, and brown; the brightly colored murals are designed to stand out from their light, cream-colored background. The interior murals include thirteen chapters of the Vessantara Jātaka depicted in panels similar to the cloth scrolls used to tell the same stories of Buddha's life during local Bun Phawet festivals with captions naming each scene. The exterior murals are mostly scenes from the Sinsai epic, the Isan version of the Lao Sang Sinxay epic. The story of the rescue of a princess from a yaksha by her three nephews begins on the south wall of the sim and travel clockwise around the building. On the west wall, the Sinsai retelling is interrupted by a panel depicting scenes from hell (naraka).

Also on the west wall, in a false window, is a self-portrait purported to be of one of the hup taem's artists, Mr. Yuak (นายยวก). A second local artist, Mr. Daeng (นายแดง), is also credited with working on the hup taem.

=== Gallery ===
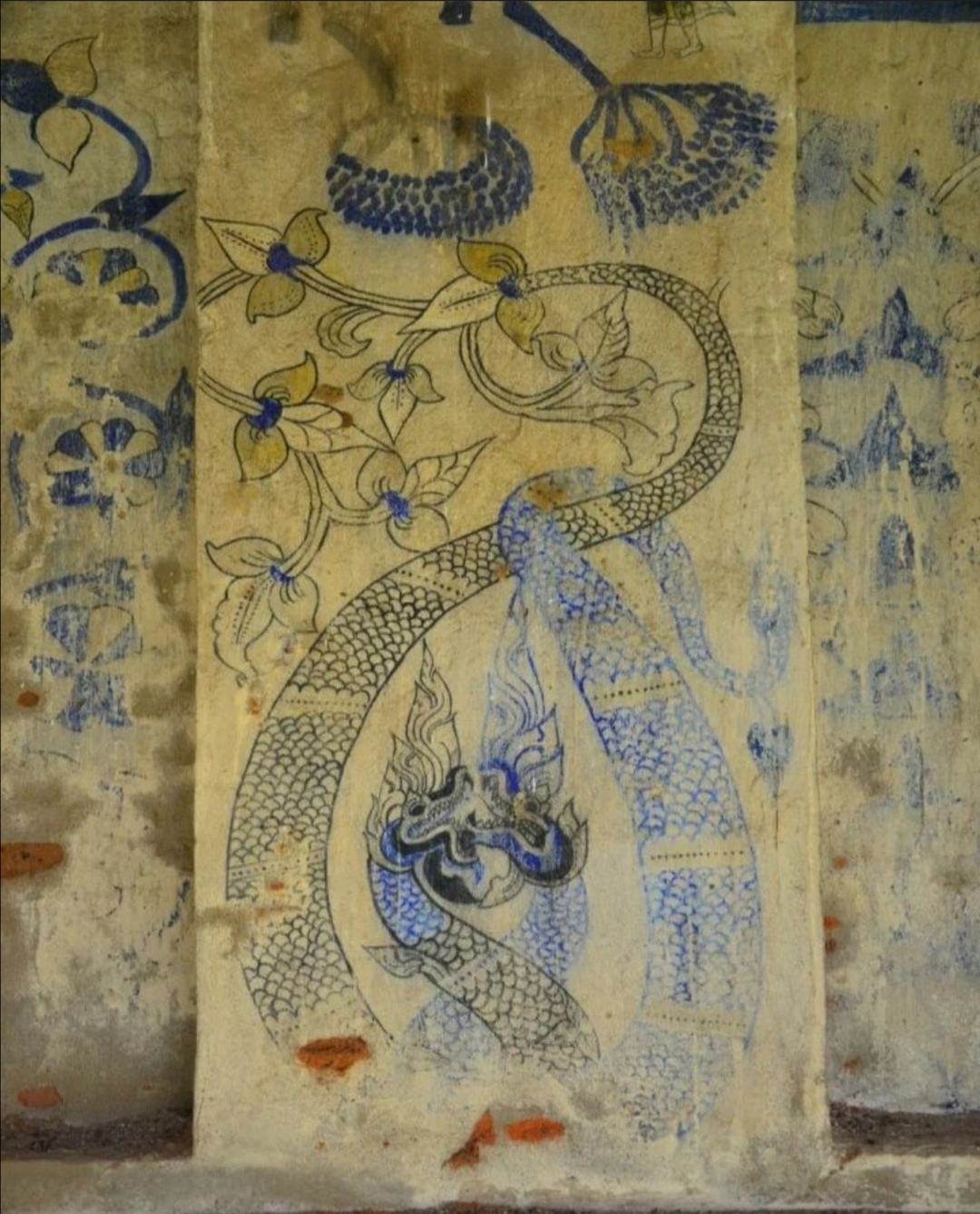

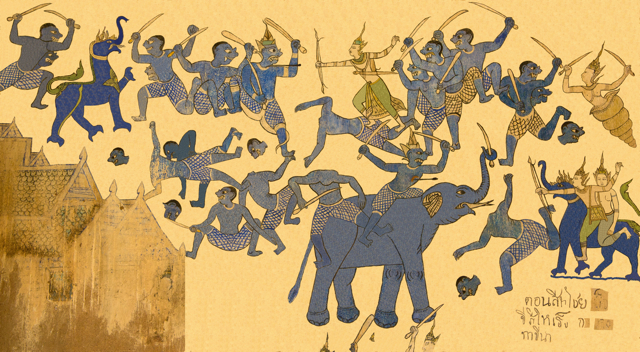

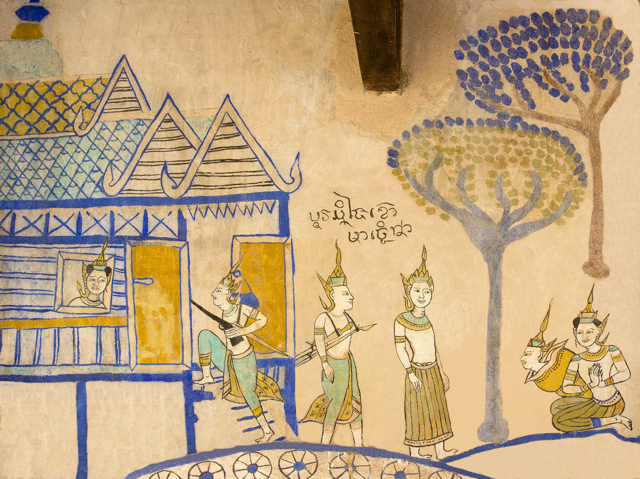

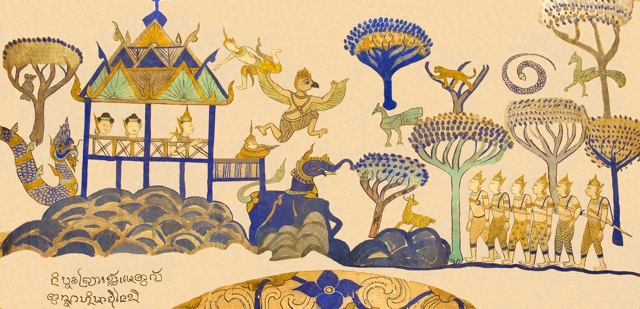
