= Sang Sinxay =

Lao epic poem

- Author: Pang Kham; Editor: Maha Sila Viravong
- Original title: ສັງສີນໄຂ
- Language: Lao
- Genre: Epic poem Jataka tale
- Published: 1969 (Ministry of Religious Affairs)
- Publication place: Laos
- Media type: Print
- Pages: 435

Sang Sinxay (Lao: ສັງສິນໄຊ, also known as Sinxay or Sinsai) (Note: Thai spelling: สังข์ศิลป์ชัย Sangsinchai) is a Lao epic poem written by Pang Kham. It tells the story of the hero Sinxay (ສິນໄຊ) who goes on a quest to rescue his aunt Soumountha (ສູມຸນທາ) who was abducted by the demon Nyak Koumphan (ຍັກກູມພັນ). The poem is believed to have been written sometime between the mid-16th and the end of the 17th century in the Lao kingdom of Lan Xang. Sang Sinxay is considered one of the three masterpieces of Lao literature. The poem is popular in Laos and in the Isan region of Thailand, where its scenes are also depicted on numerous temples.

== Historical and literary context ==
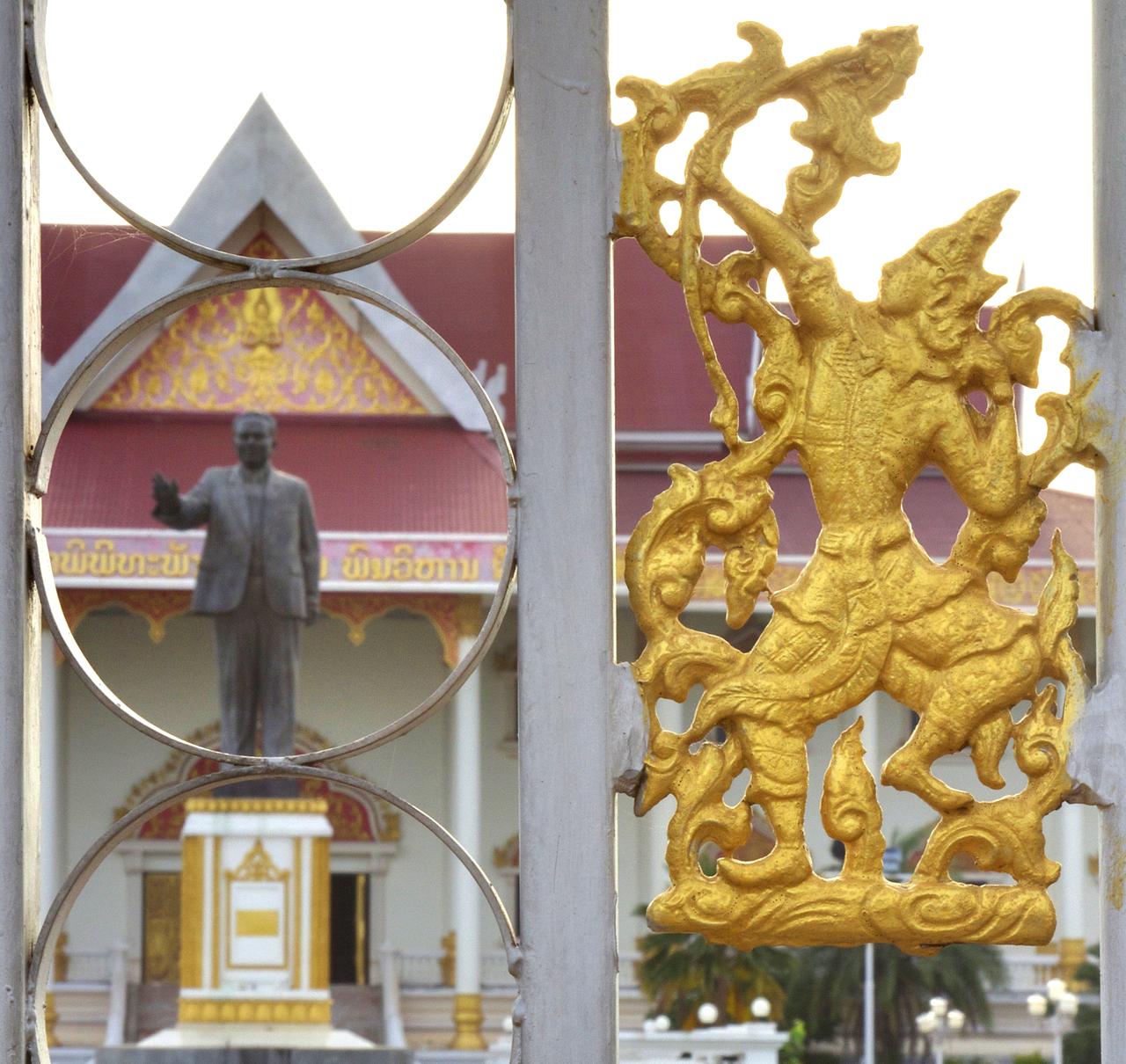
Image of Sinxay embedded in the front gate of the Kaysone Phomvihane Memorial Museum in Vientiane.

Sang Sinxay was written between the reigns of Xetthathirat and Surinyavongsa, thus between the mid-16th and the end of the 17th century. This period was considered to be a golden age of cultural development in Lan Xang, and the arts flourished in Vientiane, the Lao capital. Many of the great works of Lao literature were composed during the reign of Surinyavongsa. With his death in 1695, the Kingdom of Lan Xang began a long period of political turmoil.

Martin Stuart-Fox, in the Historical Dictionary of Laos, states that epic poems appeared in Lao literature in the late 16th century or in the beginning of the 17th century, and that Sang Sinxay is the "finest and best known" epic poem composed in this period. The names of the authors of these epic poems are unknown, except for Pang Kham, author of Sang Sinxay. Regarding Pang Kham, there is no other information than the name. Many of these epic poems were written in the style of jataka tales, with Sinxay, the hero of the poem, considered a Bodhisatta (in Pali), or Boddhisatva (in Sanskrit).

In his book, Theatre in Southeast Asia, James Brandon underlines the presence of numerous similarities between Sang Sinxay and the Ramayana, known as Phra Lak Phra Lam in Laos, without establishing whether one of the poems influenced the other, or if they were both inspired by a same source.

== Palm leaf manuscripts and publishing history ==
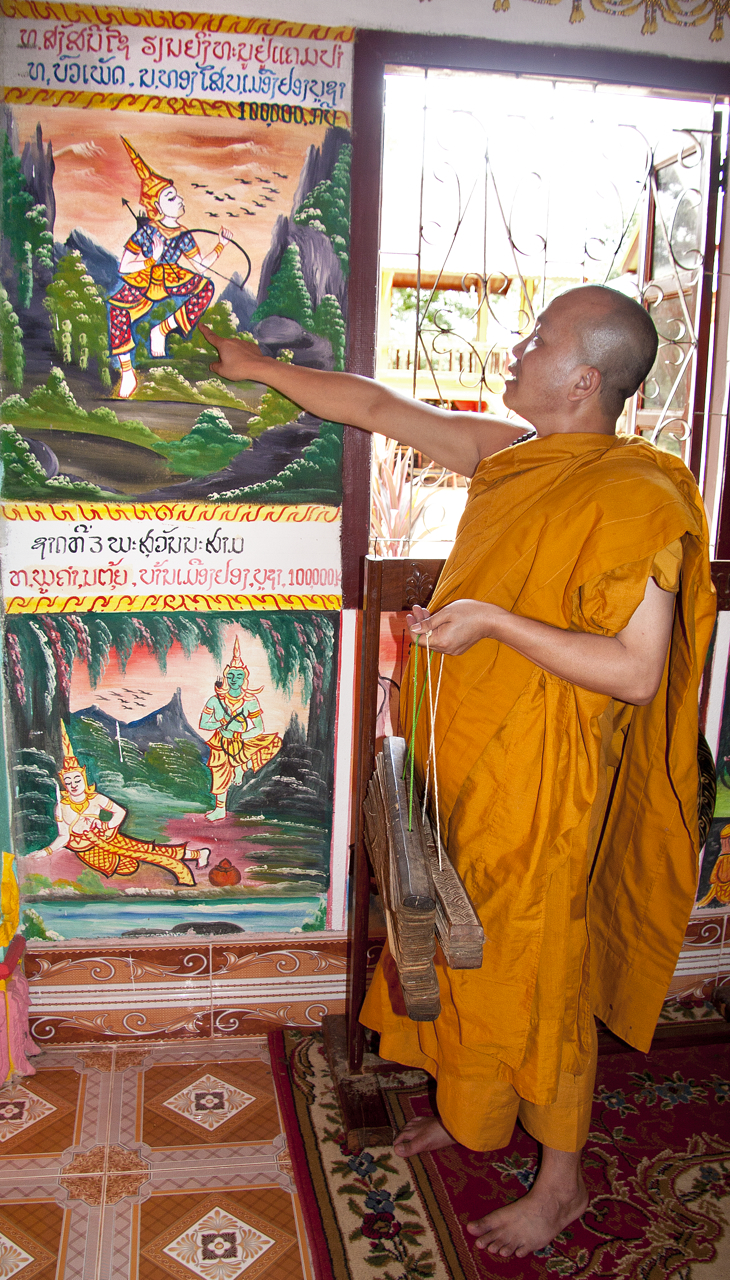
A monk holding bundles of Sang Sinxay palm-leaf manuscripts while pointing to a painting of Sinxay.

Up to the early 20th century, most works of literature in Laos were preserved through continuous copying in the form of palm-leaf manuscripts, traditionally stored in wooden caskets and kept in the libraries of Buddhist monasteries. This was the method of transmission also for Sang Sinxay. The Digital Library of Lao Manuscripts hosts 94 digitized palm leaf manuscripts whose title includes the word Sinsai (spelling used by the Digital Library of Lao Manuscripts).

One of the Sinxay palm-leaf manuscripts was discovered in the Thai National Library in Bangkok by Mahasila Viravong, a Buddhist and Pali scholar who worked there. Viravong had fled Laos when, after the end of World War II, the French tried to regain control of Laos. He transliterated the palm-leaf manuscript into Lao, and after returning to Laos he published the first edition of Sang Sinxay in 1949. The second edition was published in 1951. In 1953, Mahasila claimed that Sang Sinxay was one of three masterpieces of Lao literature, along with Vetsantrasadok and Thao Hung. He published his final edition of Sang Sinxay in hard cover format in 1969, combining the first two editions into one volume. The poem was reprinted a total of seven times between 1949 and 1983. In the 1980s, Mahasila began translating Sang Sinxay into modern Lao, hoping that a new prose edition would help future generations understand and enjoy the poem. He died before finishing the translation, which was completed by Outhine Bounyavong, his son-in-law. The new edition, titled Sinxay, was first published in 1991 by Dokked Printing Ltd, which is owned and directed by Douang Deuane Bounyavong, daughter of Mahasila Viravong.

In 2009, to commemorate the 450th Anniversary of the founding of Vientiane, Dokked Printing Ltd. published the first commemorative volume of the original Sang Sinxay, the first publication in the publisher’s "Vientiane Heritage Series". The second commemorative volume was printed in 2011. Both volumes contain explanatory notes and definitions to help the reader understand some of the older Lao words and phrases.

== Plot summary ==
Phanya Kousarath is the king of Muang Pengchan, a powerful kingdom. He and his wife, Nang Chanta, are unable to have children. The king’s sister, Soumountha, is abducted by a demon called Nyak Koumphan, ruler of a far-away kingdom of ogres. Phanya Kousarath, after becoming a Buddhist monk, embarks on a journey to find his sister. An abbot at a temple tells him that only someone with a lineage to Buddha or Indra would be able to defeat Nyak Koumphan. After being reinstated as king, Phanya Kousarath meets and marries the seven sisters he met on the monks’ morning alms. He asks them to pray to the gods for pregnancy, in order to give birth to an extraordinary child with the power to rescue Soumountha. Nang Chanta and Nang Lun pray together to Indra, who hears their prayers and chooses three of his sons to come down to earth.

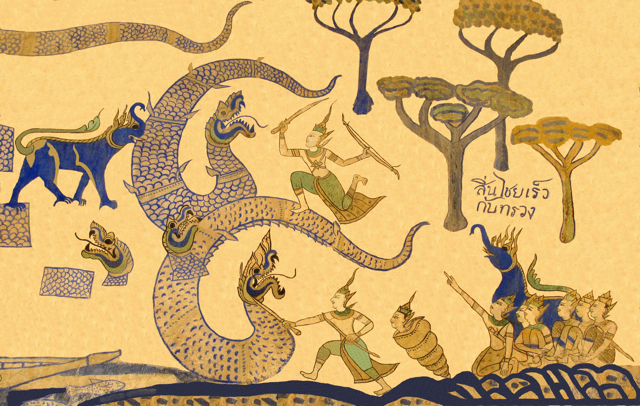
Sinxay and Siho fight the Giant Snake, depicted on a mural at Wat Sanuan Wari.

Nang Lun gives birth to two twins: Sangthong (ສັງທອງ), who has the body of a conch shell, and Sinxay (“he who will triumph by his virtues”), who holds a sword, bow and arrows. Nang Chanta gives birth to Siho (ສີໂຫ), a boy with the body of a lion and the head of an elephant, while the other six sisters give birth to normal looking human sons. Lun and Chanta and their sons are banished from the palace because of the babies’ strange appearance. They are left in the forest, where Indra sees their hardships and builds a small palace for them. When Nang Lun returns Sinxay's weapons to him, the young man demonstrates his power by shooting two arrows. The first lands in the kingdom of the khut (garuda in Thai), while the second one lands in the kingdom of the nagas. Both kings lead millions of their followers to Sinxay’s palace, pledging their service to him.

Once the six brothers have become young men, Phanya Kousarath sends them on a quest to find the power needed to rescue Soumountha. After getting lost in the forest, they are led by Indra to Sinxay’s palace. Through deception, they convince Sinxay to make all the animals in the forest appear at the palace in Muang Pengchan. They use this to convince their father that they have gained the magical powers they were seeking.

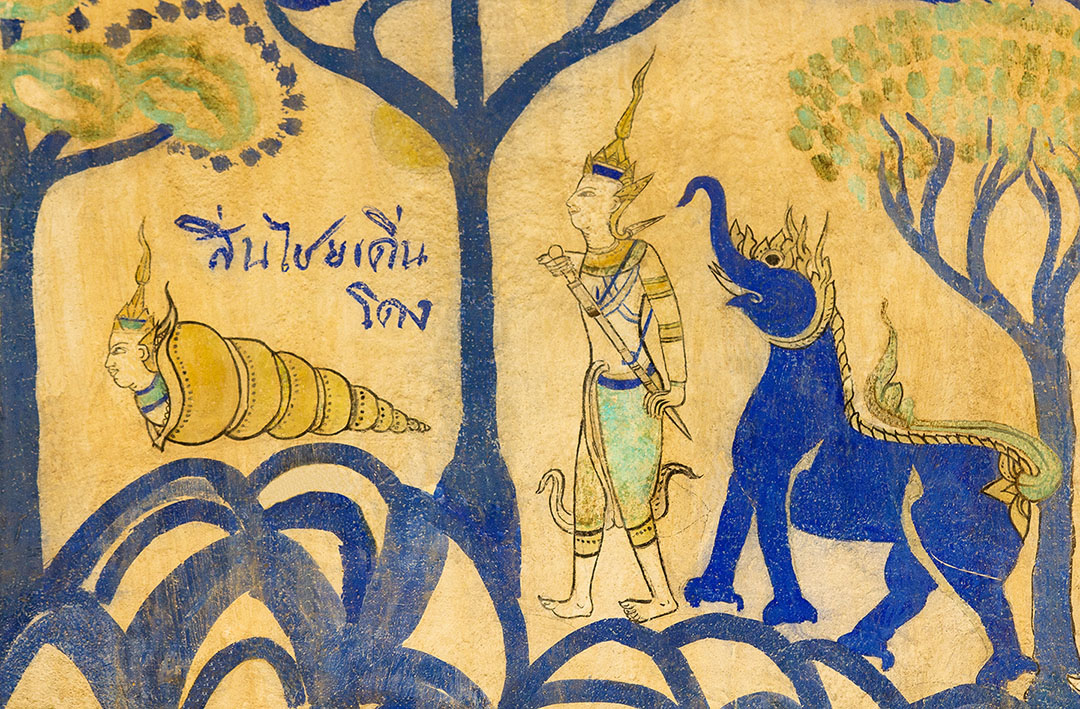
Depiction of Sinxay, Sangthong and Siho. Mural detail in Wat Sanuan Wari

The king sends them on a quest to rescue his sister. They end up at Sinxay’s palace again, and trick him into believing he is the one chosen by the king for the quest. The six brothers, Sinxay, Sangthong and Siho leave together, but upon meeting a giant snake the six flee in terror while Siho and Sinxay kill the snake. When they arrive at a river, the six brothers refuse to proceed further. Sinxay leaves Siho to protect them, and sets off to rescue Soumountha along with Sangthong. In his journey, Sinxay meets many obstacles, some of which set on his course by Nyak Koumphan. He also encounters the fabled Nariphon tree, jealously guarded by Phanyathone. After enjoying the nariphon and having to fight the phanyathone, Sinxay comes upon Ton Kalapheuk, the mythical Wishing Tree, covered in jewels and hand woven silk textiles. He chooses one textile to keep, along with a set of royal clothes to wear when meeting Soumountha. He also meets a group of kinnari, and falls in love with one of them, Kiengkham. He leaves her after seven days with the promise of returning to marry her.

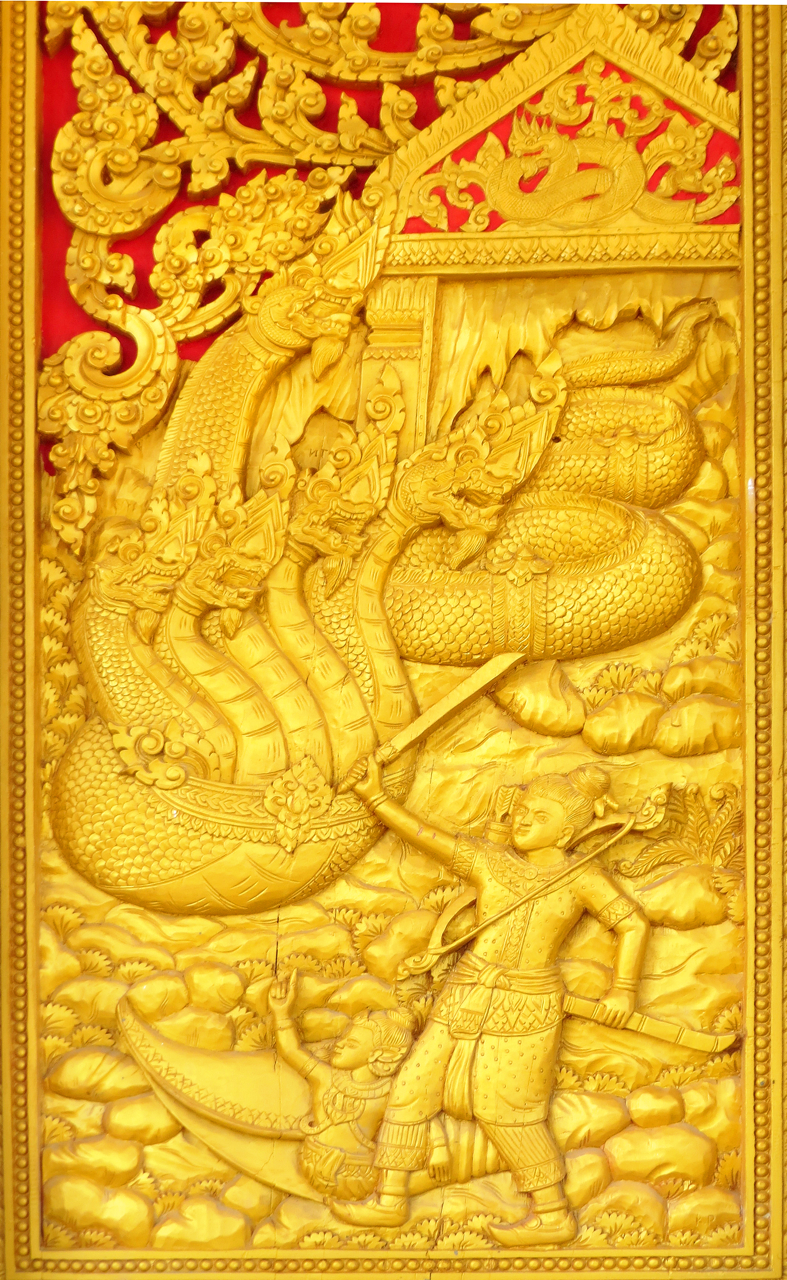
Carved gilded door depicting Sinxay fighting Nak Valoonarat.

Finally Sinxay and Sangthong reach Nyak Koumphan’s palace, where they meet their aunt Soumountha, only to discover she has fallen in love with Koumphan and does not want to go back to Muang Pengchan. Sinxay shoots an arrow, whose power makes Koumphan fall into a deep sleep. After leading Soumountha to a cave created by Indra, Sinxay and Sangthong go back to Koumphan’s palace, and try to kill him while he sleeps. Every time they slice off their head, though, seven more nyaks appear. Sinxay then shoots an arrow that burns many of the nyaks and makes the remaining ones flee into the forest.

After retrieving Soumountha and finding a palace in the forest created for them by Indra, the two brothers are surrounded by millions of nyaks. After two great battles Sinxay manages to kill Koumphan. Soumountha then asks Sinxay to rescue her daughter, Sidachan, who is now the wife of Nak Valoonarat, king of the nagas and guardian of underworld treasures. When they reach his palace, Sinxay challenges him to a game of chess. He bets his weapons, while the king bets his kingdom. After three wins, Sinxay proposes to take Sidachan instead of the kingdom, but Nak Valoonarat refuses, prompting a battle against millions of nagas. Sinxay and Sangthong are helped in the battle by the khut, and they finally prevail, capturing Nak Valoonarat, who agrees to hand over Sidachan.

Sinxay, Sangthong, Soumountha and Sidachan are rejoined with Siho and the six brothers, still by the river. The six brothers start planning to take credit for the rescue. While bathing at the top of the waterfall, they push Sinxay over the edge, believing he is dead. Soumountha leaves her silk scarf, her ornamented hairpin and her hair extension by the river, praying they would be returned to the palace as proof of Sinxay’s survival. Indra descends from the heavens and pours sacred water on Sinxay, bringing him back to life and leading him to the palace in the forest, to his mother Nang Lun and his aunt Nang Chanta.

Back in Muang Pengchan, a celebration is held in honor of the six brothers, who would soon be kings. Soon, though, Soumountha and Sidachan tell Phanya Kousarath how the events unfolded. He receives proof when a mariner tells him of the three objects he found by the river. The six brothers and their mothers are thrown into jail, and the king embarks on a journey to locate Sinxay. They find him at his palace, but Sinxay refuses to return to Muang Pengchan to become king. Soumountha convinces Sinxay with a speech, explaining that it is in the best interest of the kingdom. He returns to Muang Pengchang, where he becomes king, marries Kiengkham, and rules virtuously.

=== Alternate ending ===
The original Sang Sinxay edited by Mahasila Viravong ends with Sinxay’s marriage with Kiengkham. This is the most commonly known version in Laos. In Isan an alternate ending is best known, and is also represented on murals in temples of the region.

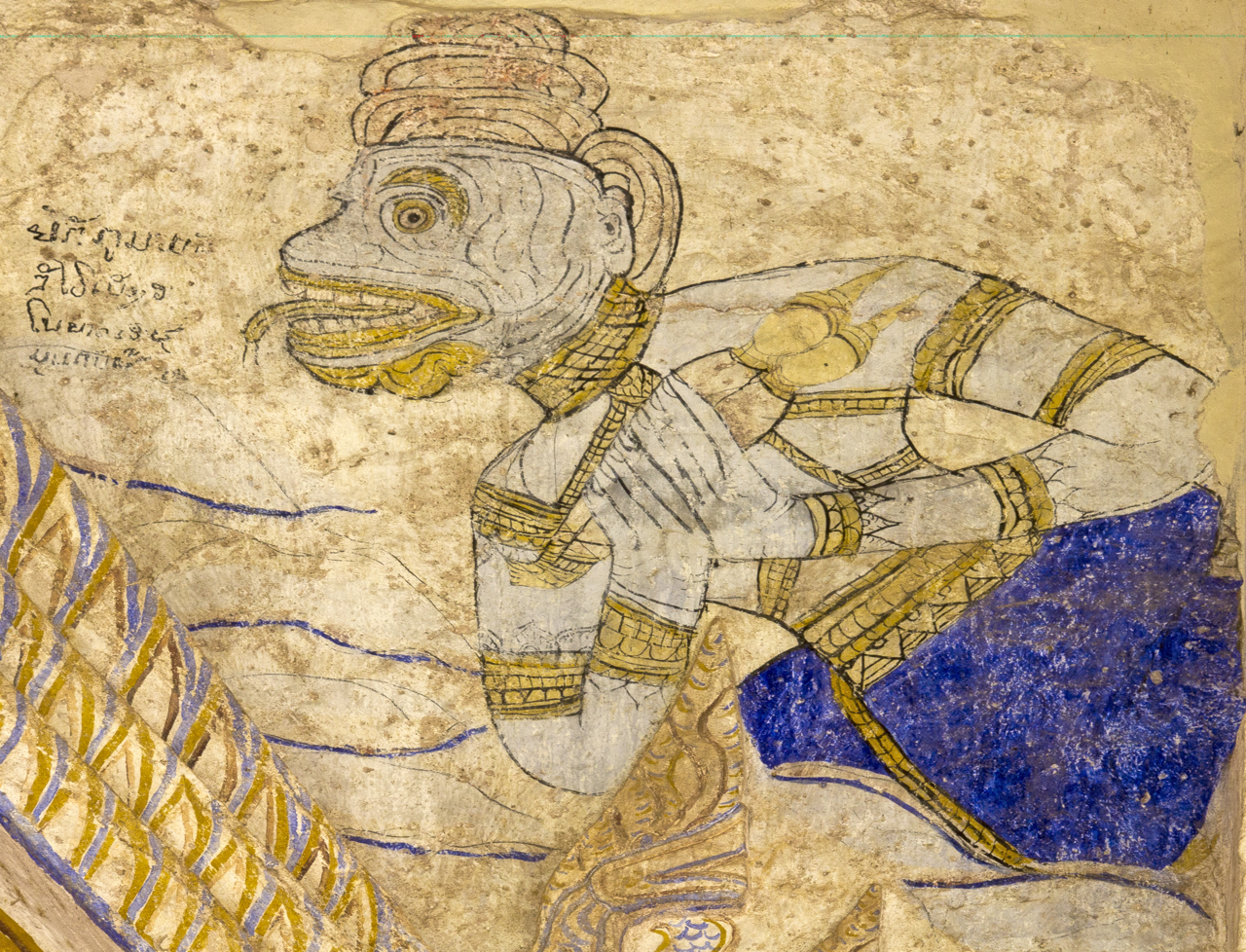
Depiction of the abduction of Sinxay and Soumountha by Nyak Koumphan.

After Sinxay becomes king, Vedsuvan, the nyak leader, notices he has not heard from Nyak Koumphan in over seven years. He sends two of his nobles down to earth, where they discover that Koumphan has been killed by Sinxay. Vedsuvan descends to earth, and pours sacred water on Koumphan’s bones, which were laid in a stupa after his funeral and cremation, bringing him back to life. Koumphan is still angry, and wants to return Soumountha to his kingdom. Defying Vedsuvan, he becomes a queen fly, and flies at night into the palace in Muang Pengchan, abducting Soumountha and Sinxay. Returning to his kingdom he places Sinxay in a wooden cage, planning to boil him alive in an iron cauldron.

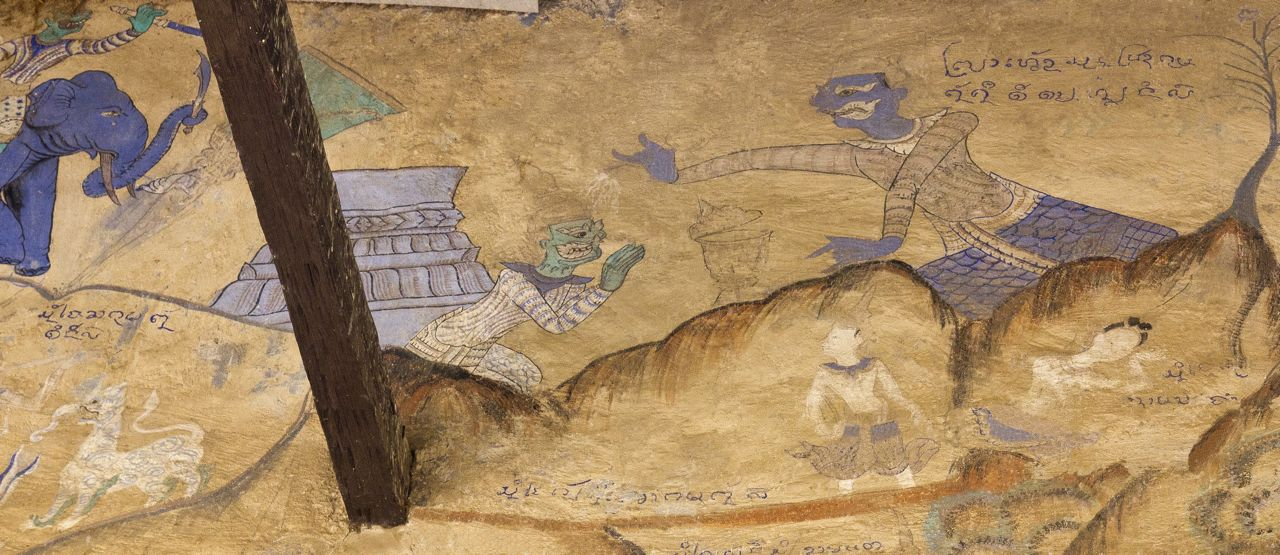
Vedsuvan brings Koumphan back to life, but Koumphan still yearns for Soumountha.

Sangthong and Siho, upon discovering the abduction, fly to the kingdom of the nyaks with Sinxay’s weapons. Transforming themselves, they sneak their way through the thousands of nyaks gathered around Sinxay’s cage. Siho slips Sinxay’s bow and arrows and sword through the bars, while Sangthong, who has become a frog, knocks over the iron cauldron, scalding the nearby nyaks. Sinxay frees himself using his sword, and he is challenged to a battle by a furious Koumphan. Indra, from Tavatimsa Heaven, sees the confrontation that is about to take place, and intervenes, calming down Koumphan.

Koumphan’s anger finally dissipates, and he agrees to travel to Muang Pengchan and ask for Soumountha’s hand in the traditional and customary way. She accepts his proposal, they marry, and Koumphan builds a saphanthong, a golden bridge connecting the kingdom of nyaks with the humans, as a symbol of alliance. Sinxay continues being the virtuous king of Muang Pengchan, with his kingdom now strengthened by the new alliances with the khuts, naks and nyaks..

== Style ==
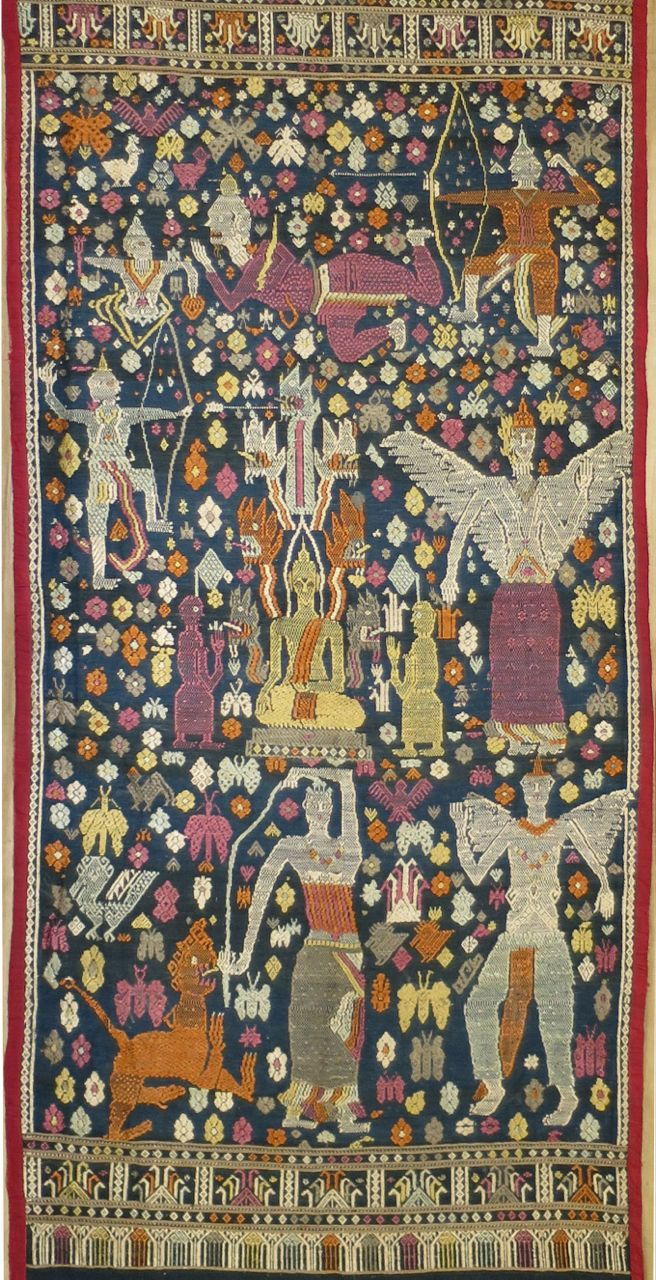
A textile depicting characters from Sang Sinxay. A Buddha motif is placed in its center.

Sang Sinxay is one of the poetic works which was meant to be read out loud on special occasions such as religious festivals, an art which became known as nangsu, a term which to this day is used to describe storytelling in Laos. The poem is written in old Lao language and Pali. It is composed of 6000 verses. Before being written, it was probably part of the oral tradition of the area. The Lao Buddhist literature works usually begin as oral folk tales, before being written, and transformed in style and content to help the temples in their teaching of Buddhist values.

== Sang Sinxay as a Buddhist work ==
Sang Sinxay is believed to be a non-canonical jataka, tales outside the section of the Pali Buddhist canon, called by the Thai and the Lao Jataka Nauk Nibat. This is supported by the presence, at the end of the poem, of a muan sadok section, a summary in which the characters of the tale are identified with characters in the life of Buddha. In the muan sadok section of Sang Sinxay, the hero Sinxay is identified as the Buddha:

This [story] is how Sinxay attained uncountable parami. Sinxay was not ordinary; he was the Buddha teaching us through his actions in this story. He leads beings so they can escape samsara. He wants to share his wisdom with both the human and the phrom world. Even Siho and Sangthong were like shadows of the Buddha. They were the same as Mahamoggallana, with supernatural powers to teach the dharma. Many of the main characters in Sinxay, such as Soumountha were relatives of the Buddha.”

Believing that Sang Sinxay is a Theravada jataka, then Sinxay, as a Bodhisatta, is considered to be one of the previous lives of Gautama Buddha.

Phong Samaleuk, Supreme Patriarch of the Lao Buddhist Fellowship Organization, believes Sinxay exists in a collection of the Paññāsa Jātaka, but no one, including Mahasila could locate Sinxay in any collection.

A pamphlet released for a "Sinxay Day" held in Khon Kaen in February 2011 states that "the Buddhist teachings within Sinxay are recognized for espousing the virtues of gratitude, courage, honesty, sacrifice and self-sufficiency, among others". One of the main reasons the municipality adopted Sinxay as their symbol in 2005 was that they found these virtues to be lacking in their youth, and believed Sinxay presents a model worth emulating.

== Legacy ==
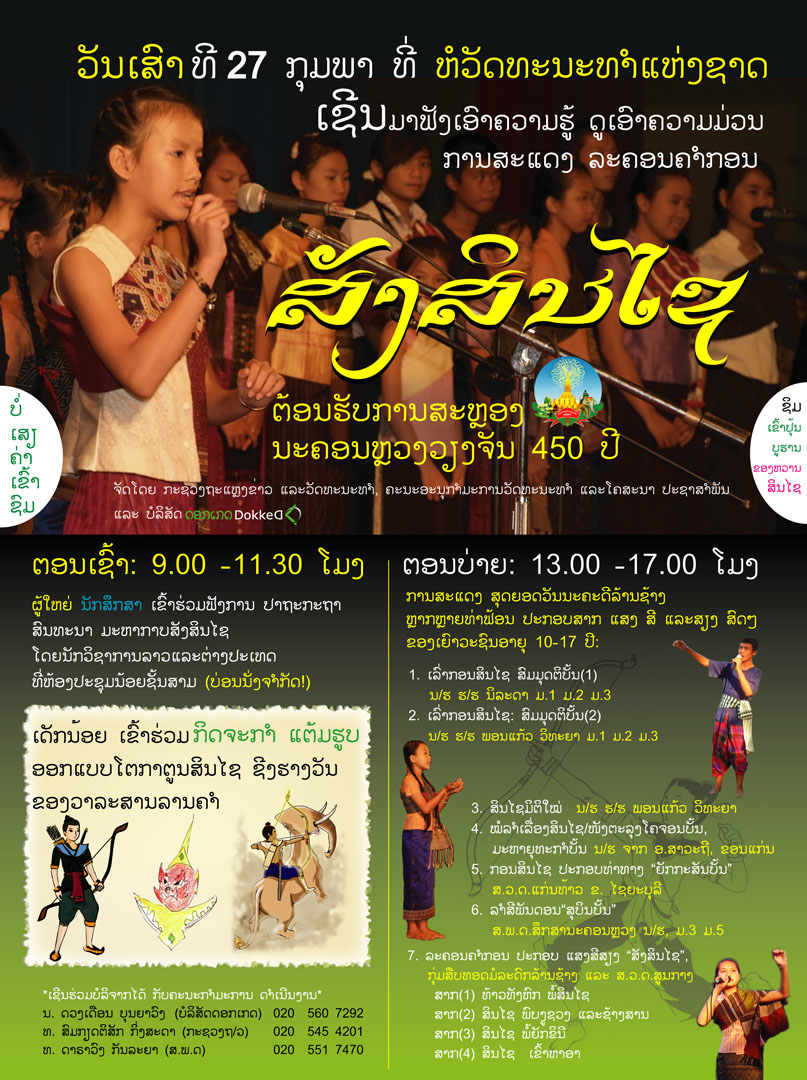
Flyer for Sinxay Day, held in Vientiane.

Sang Sinxay is considered among the greatest and best known Lao epic poems, and its main character, Sinxay, is well known in Lao. In 1975 Kaysone Phomvihane, first Prime Minister of the newly formed Democratic People's Republic of Laos, exhorted Lao youth to become “Sinxay of the New Era”, since he referred to the poem often in his life. The phrase was used again in November 2009 at the opening of the Southeast Asian Games in Vientiane, when a young man dressed as Sinxay shot his flaming arrow to light the cauldron, while an announcement said: “Sinxay of the new era lights up the cauldron with the flame of his arrow.”

In 2005 the Lao government proclaimed Sinxay a national cultural heritage which was recorded under the National Heritage Law. In the same year the mayor of Khon Kaen Municipality, Peerapol Pattanapeeradej, chose Sinxay as the new symbol of the city. The character was chosen in the hope that the Buddhist virtues present in him would become embedded in the municipality's youth. In the following years municipality officials implemented a plan to promote the figure of Sinxay through teacher-developed curriculum taught in schools, a sports day, specialized programs held throughout the year and lampposts featuring Sinxay, Siho and Sangthong. The Abbot of Wat Chaisi, Phra Kou Yathanyakon, worked closely with the Khon Kaen Municipality to help implement summer programs for youth in the temple, expanding on the Buddhist teachings of ‘’Sang Sinxay’’.

In February 2010, during the celebration for the 450th anniversary of Vientiane, a special day was organized to commemorate Sinxay, with performances by the Children’s Education Development Center, displays of illustrations by students from local schools and various lectures about the hero. It was coordinated by Douangdeuane Bounyavong.

Representations of characters from Sang Sinxay on lampposts in Khon Kaen

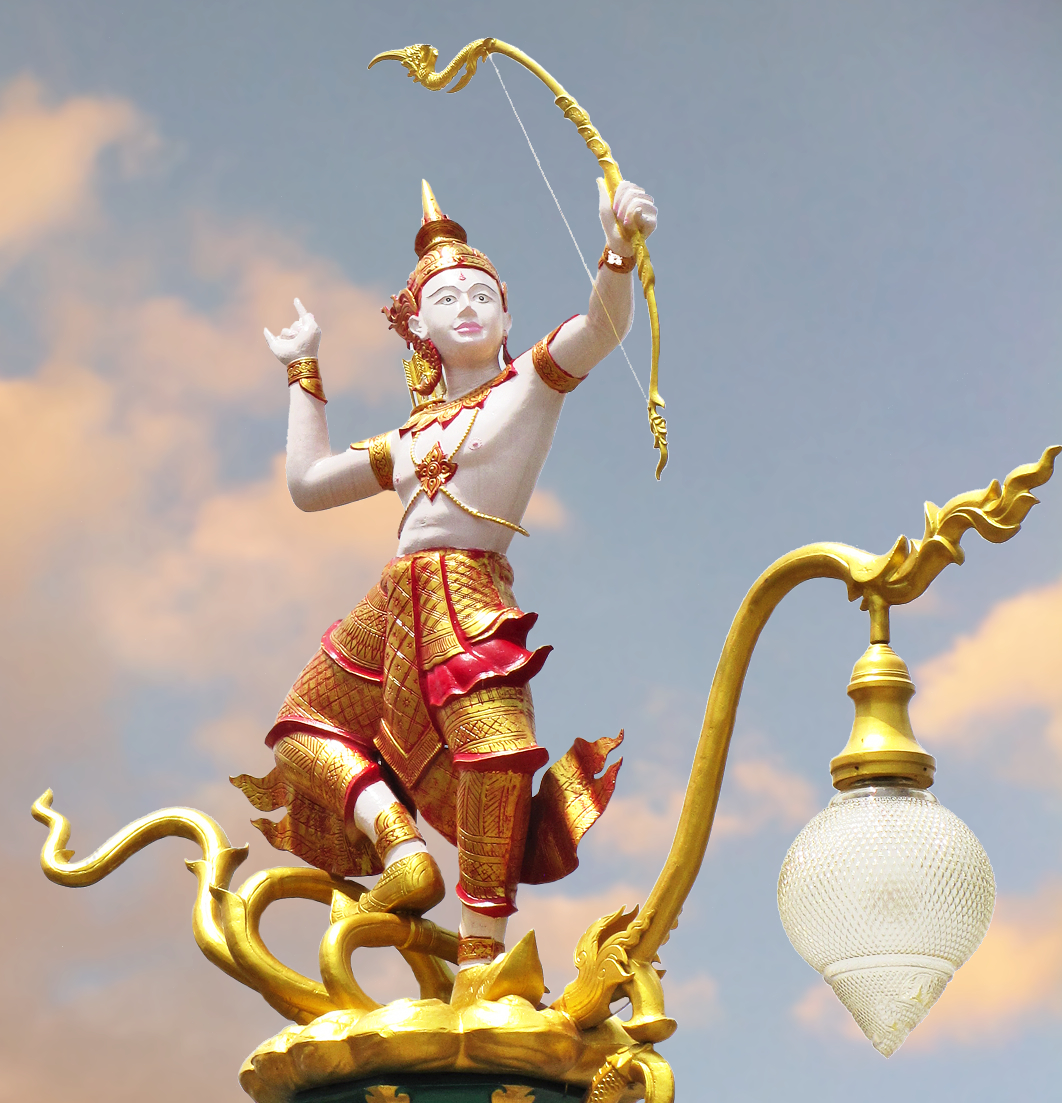
Lamppost finial depicting Sinxay

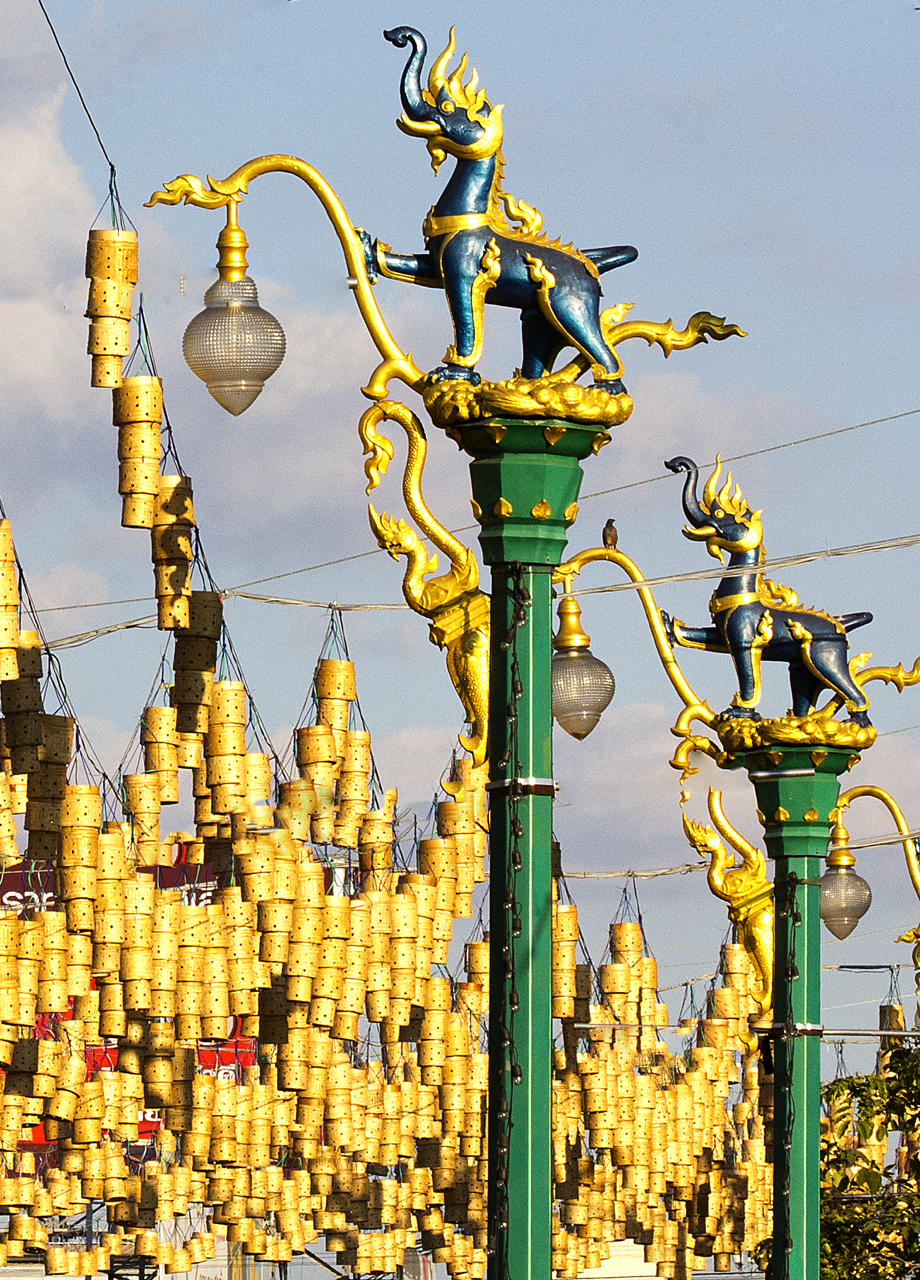
Lamppost finial depicting Siho

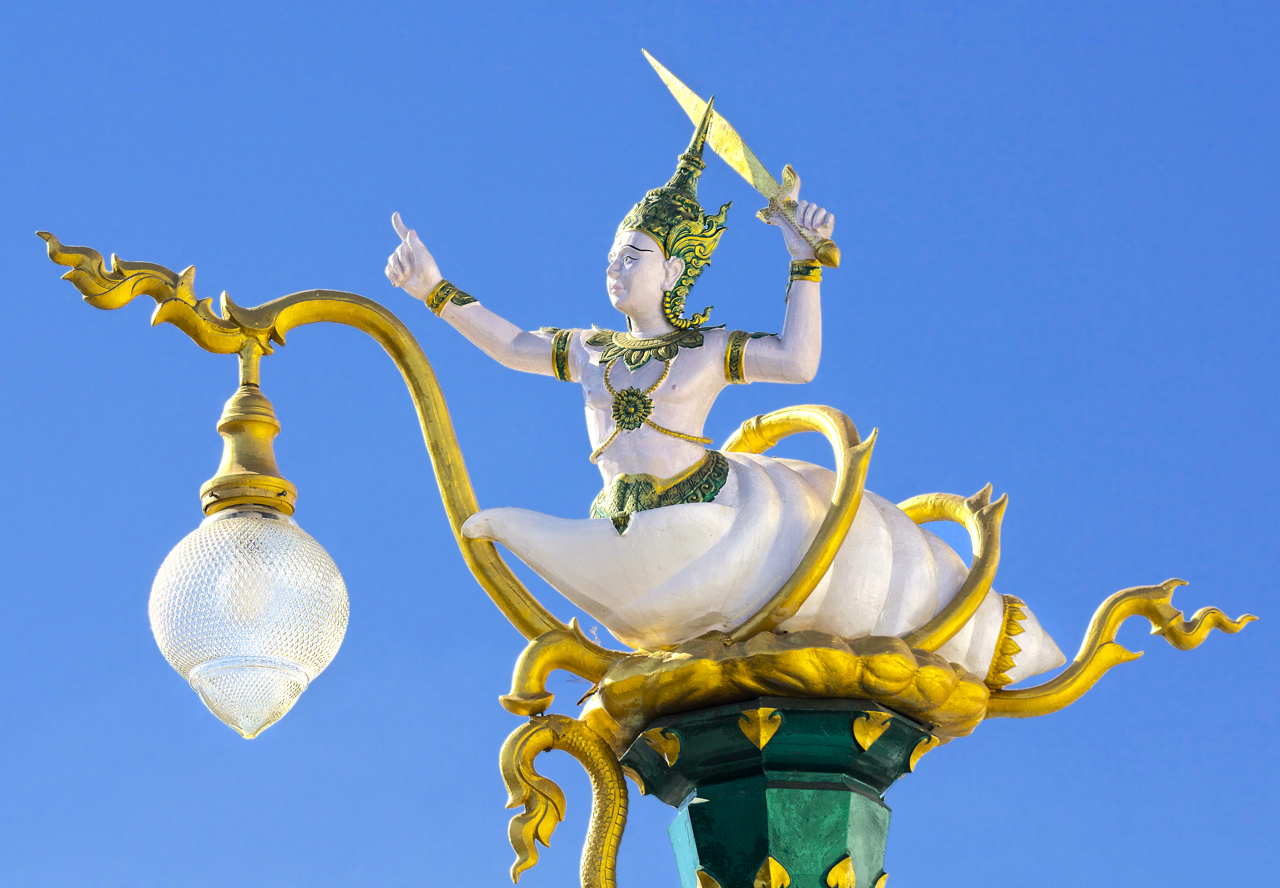
Lamppost finial depicting Sangthong

== Sang Sinxay in the arts ==
At the time Sang Sinxay was written, the Lao kingdom of Lan Xang also encompassed the northeastern region of Thailand commonly referred to as Isan. In the late 19th century, when the French declared Laos a protectorate of France, the northeast region was ceded to Siam. The Thai people living in this region, who refer to themselves as Khon Isan, still closely associate themselves with Lao culture. Sang Sinxay is, to this day, an important shared cultural heritage of the Lao people on both sides of the Mekong River, thus art depicting scenes from the books can be found in both Isan and Laos.

=== In Laos ===
Although Sang Sinxay was originally meant to be read out loud or sung, this oral tradition has declined, and the poem is now rarely chanted in temples. One exception is the Lan Xang Heritage Group’s poem recital project, founded by Daravong Kanlagna, grandson of Mahasila Viravong. The group promoted the recital and the performance of Sang Sinxay by primary and secondary school students. Notably, Sang Sinxay was performed in Tokyo, by children who participated to the Poetry Reading and Folk Singing for Lao Children Project organized in collaboration with Vientiane's Children's Education Centre and the NGO Action with Lao Children (Deknoi Lao), and funded by Tokyo's Ota Ward.

Scenes from the poem are represented on murals, reliefs and statues at various Buddhist temples throughout the country. In Vientiane, scenes from Sang Sinxay are carved on the front doors and the right side window panels of the temple of Wat Haysoke. The temple of Wat Sisangvone, in the Lao capital, presents at the front entrance a relief depicting Sinxay and Nyak Koumphan, and at the rear entrance two reliefs of Nyak Koumphan holding Soumountha.

A number of temples in the northeastern province of Huaphan host murals of Sinxay and Nyak Koumphan, often depicted on opposite sides of the entrance to the sim, and portraying Sinxay shooting his arrows at Nyak Koumphan. In Sam Neua a recently constructed temple, Wat Ong Teu, features gilded carvings designed by renowned Vientiane artist Bounseng Thiepphongthong. The carvings depict scenes from Sang Sinxay on each of the three sets of doors at the front of the sim.

Depictions of scenes from ‘’Sang Sinxay’’ in Laos

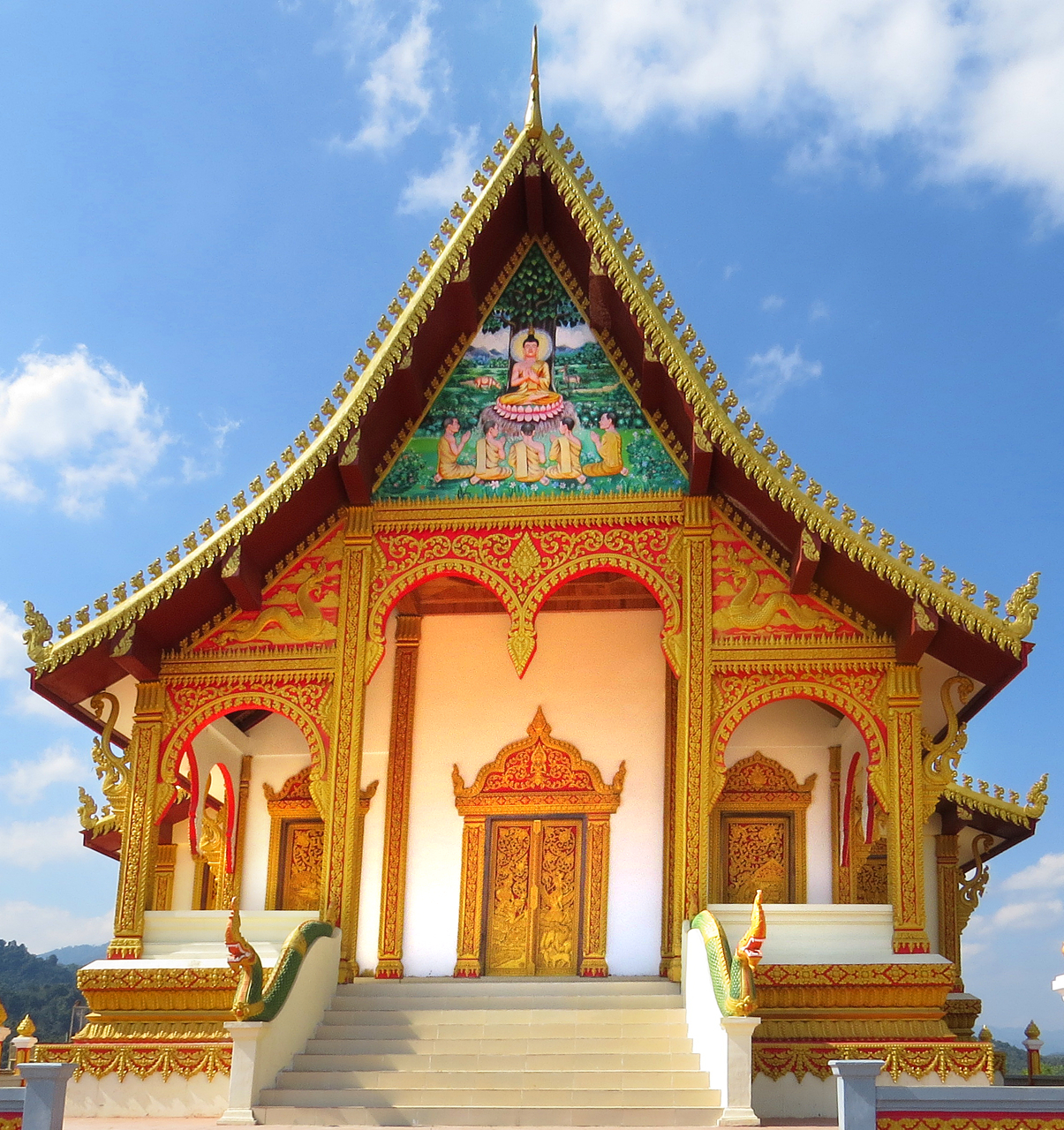
Wat Ong Teu, in Sam Neua.

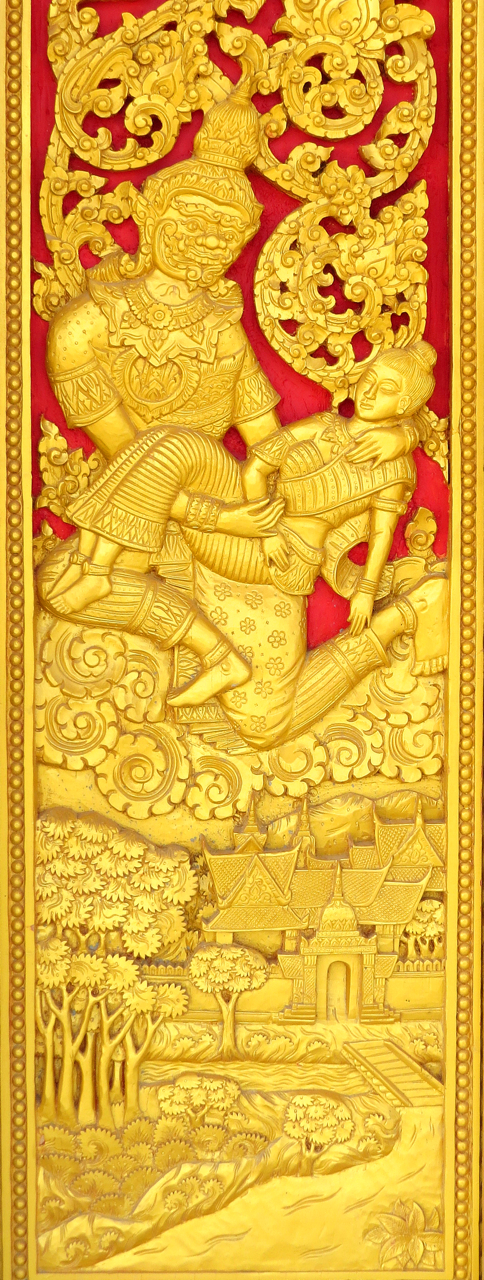
Detail of a carved gilded front door at Wat Ong Teu, in Sam Neua.

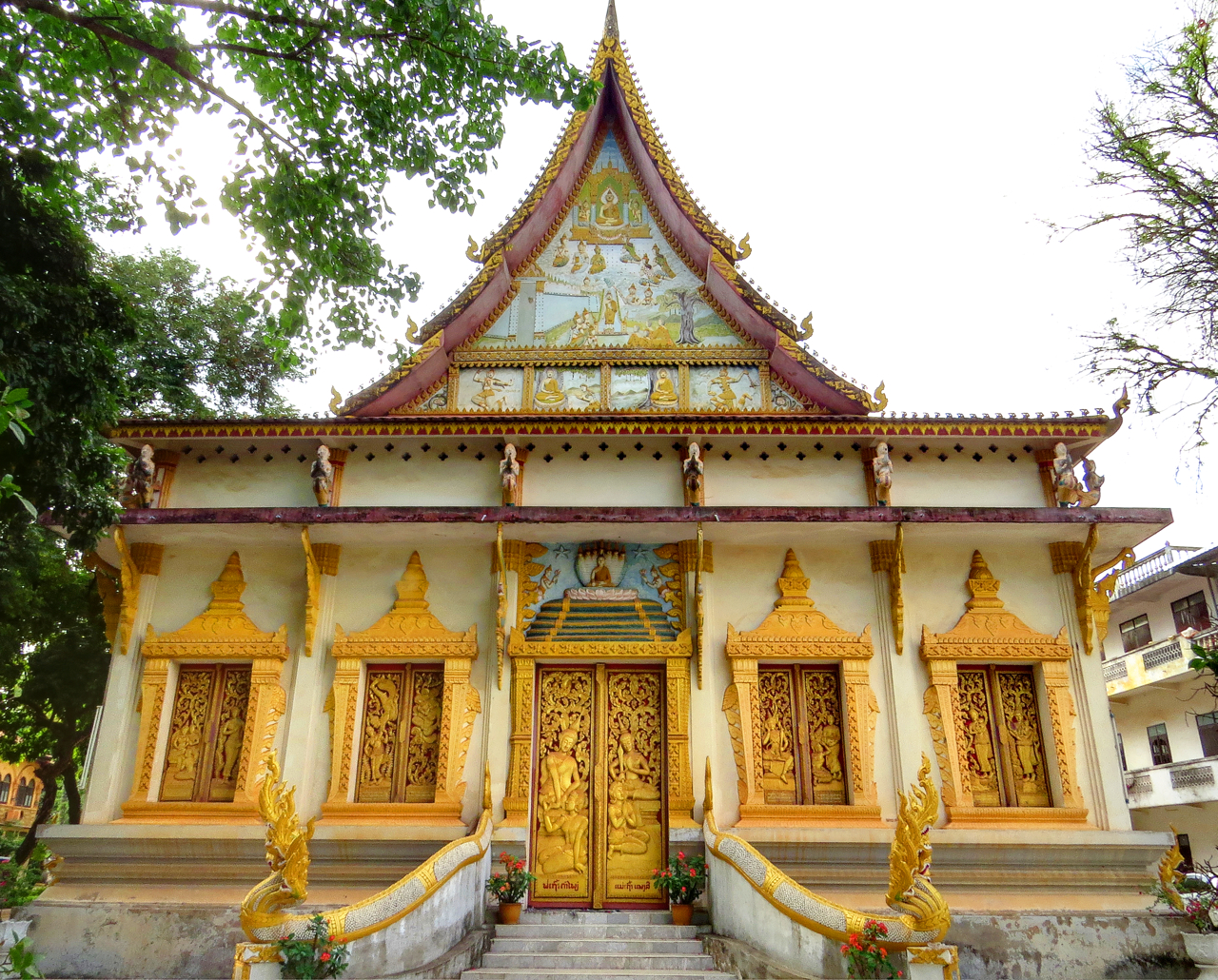
Front door of Wat Haysoke, featuring carvings of scenes from Sang Sinxay.

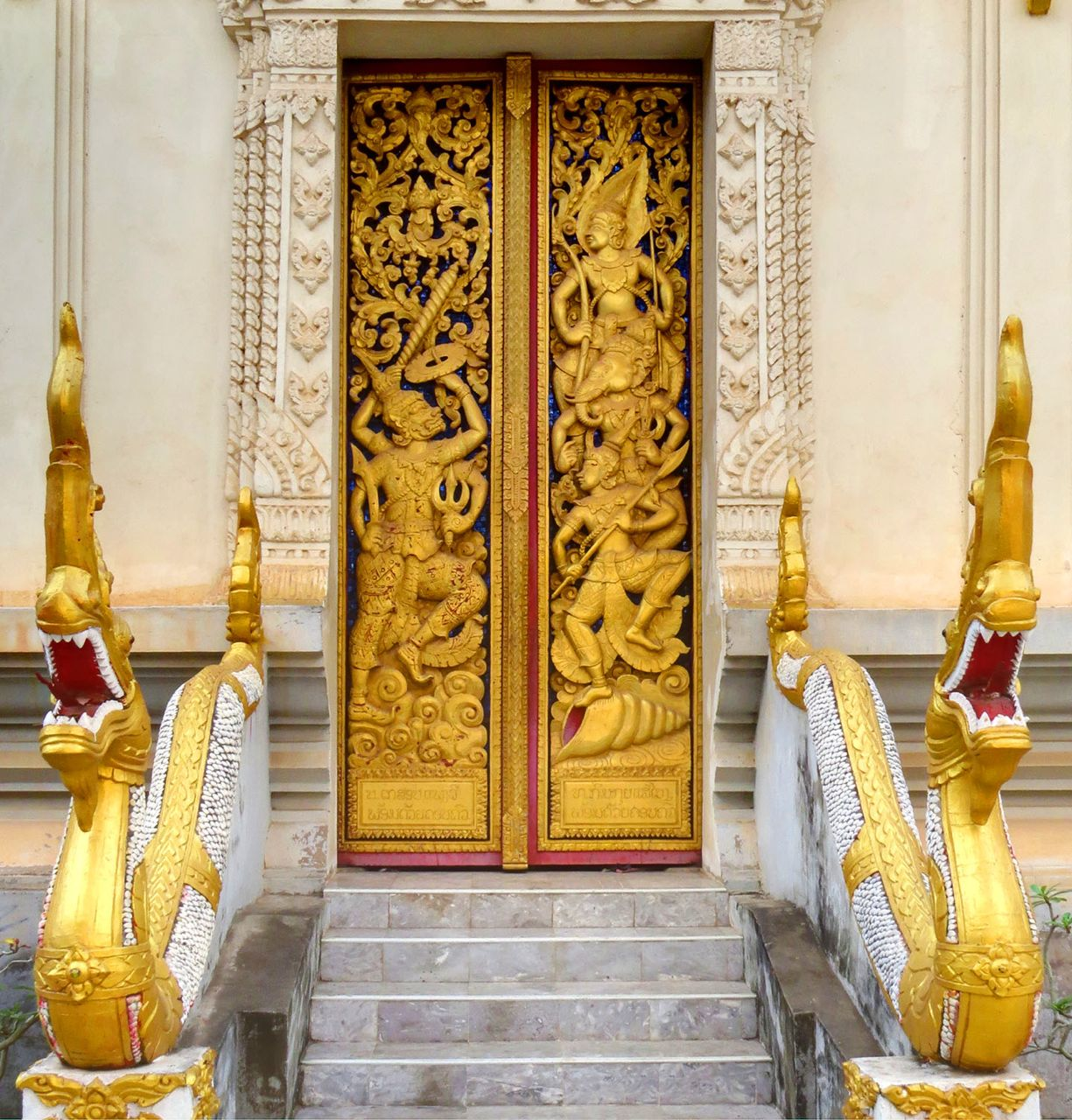
Carved door panels at Wat Haysoke, depicting Koumphan battling Sinxay (on top), Siho (in the middle), and Sangthong, standing on his conch shell body.

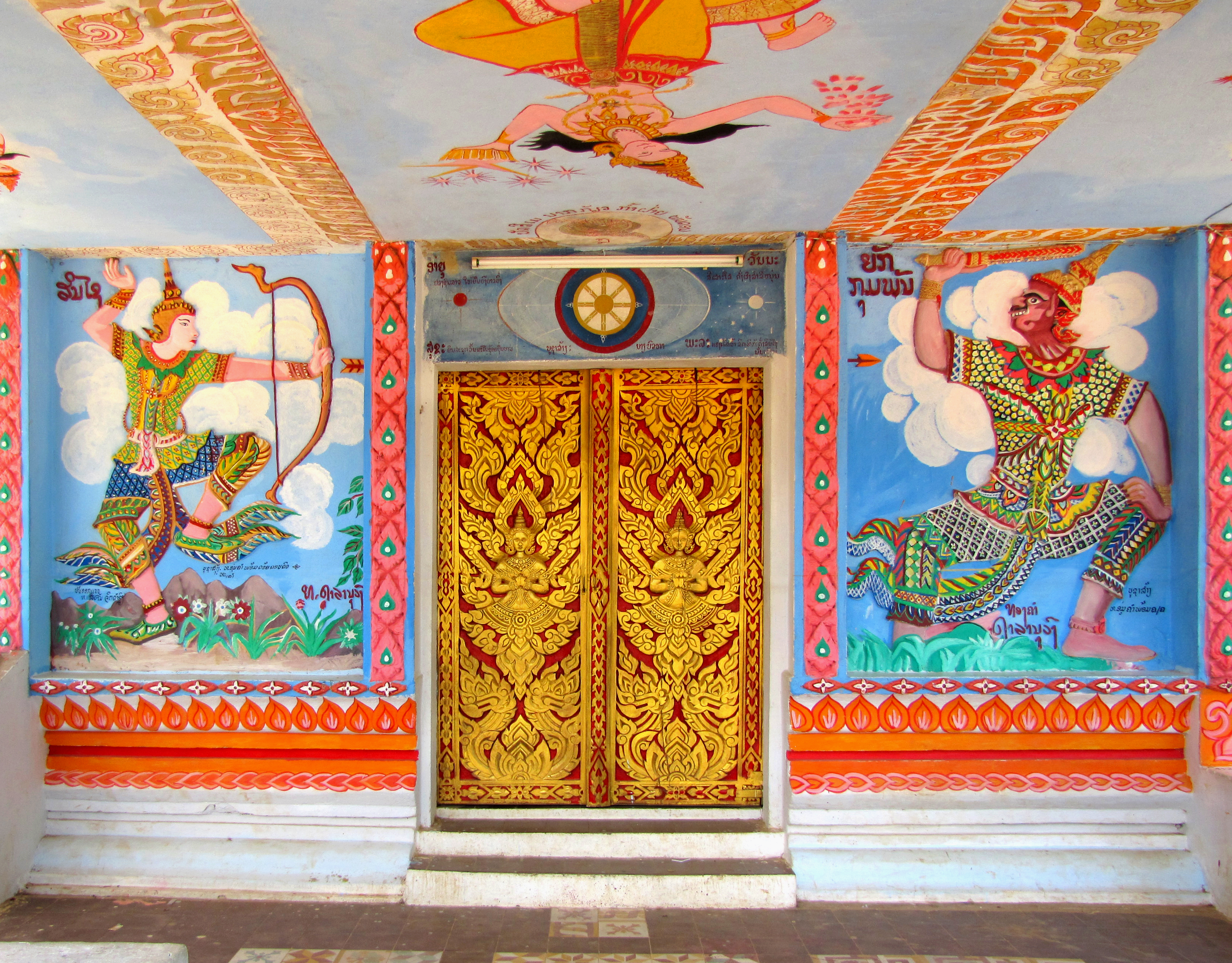
A mural depicting characters from Sang Sinxay at Wat Phone Xai, in Sam Neua.

=== In Thailand ===
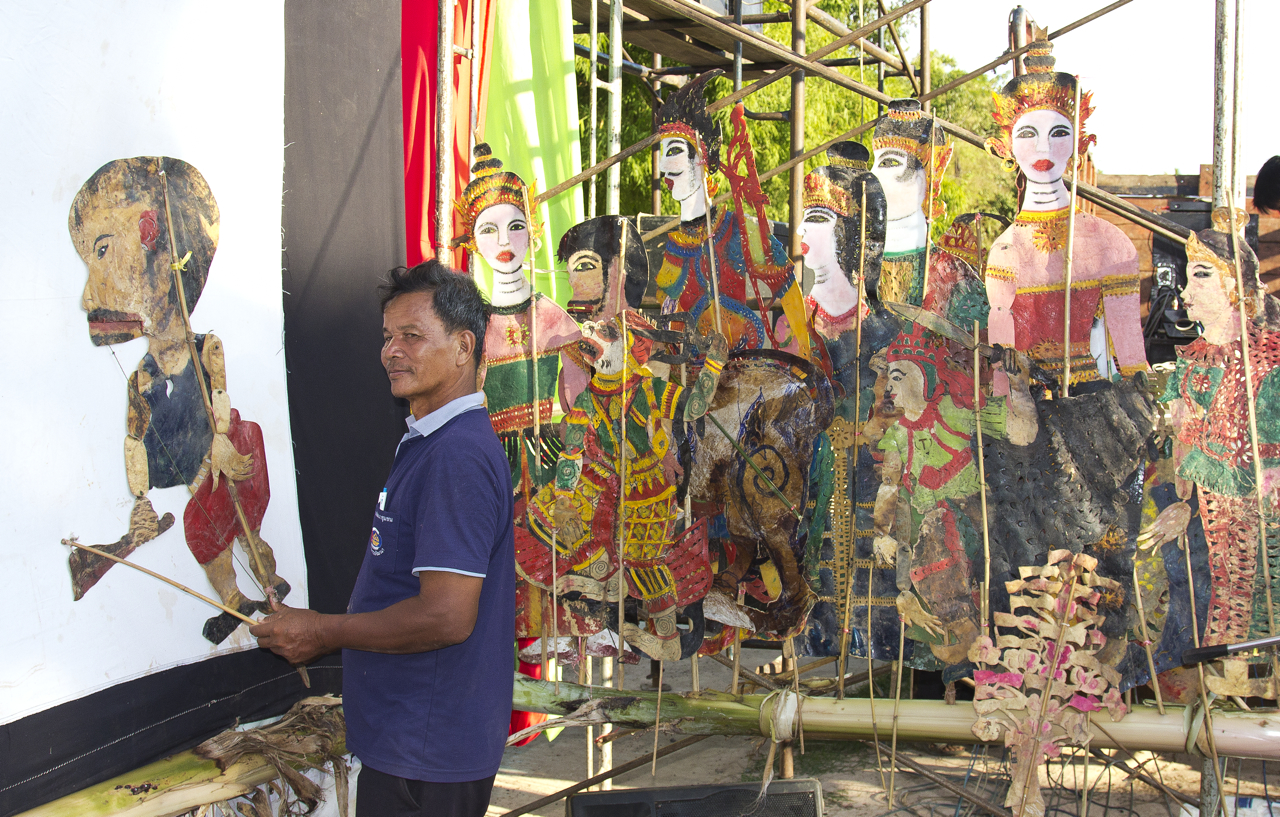
Sombat Nyotbatum, leader of the Bong Beng troupe, with shadow puppets.

In Isan or the northeastern part of Thailand, three temples host 'hup taem' murals featuring scenes from Sang Sinxay. Wat Chaisi, proclaimed Ancient Monument by the King, has the most extensive murals, covering all four sides of the outer and inner walls of the sim. The painting of the murals was overseen by Luang Po On Sa, a monk who wanted to motivate the laity who were too busy to study the dharma to be virtuous like Sinxay. The murals attempt to depict the complete story, but are not arranged sequentially.

Wat Sanuan Wari hosts fewer murals, although they are often used to illustrate the story in books and other media. One of the murals depicts Sinxay, Sangthong and Siho fighting the giant snake. While Wat Chaisi and Wat Sanuan Wari are located near Khon Kaen, the regional center of Isan, Wat Photaram is situated further away, in Maha Sarakham. In this temple scenes from Sang Sinxay are depicted on a single outside wall, covering it entirely. The scenes depicted are different from those found in other temples, including one scene portraying the battle between the nagas led by Nak Valoonarat and Sinxay, helped by the khut.

In Isan Sang Sinxay is one of the most commonly performed stories within the shadow puppet theatre tradition called Nang Pramo Thai, along with the Ramakien. In this tradition the stories are performed at weddings, funerals, and Buddhist merit-making ceremonies. The most well known troupe, called "Bong Beng" and led by Sombat Nyotbatum, performs Sang Sinxay about sixty times a year. The troupe replaced the Ramakien with Sang Sinxay because the latter is written in royal Thai, which is more difficult to teach and learn. The performances of Sang Sinxay are usually accompanied by Lao music, and the main instrument used is the khene. Both the murals and the shadow puppet performances inspired by Sang Sinxay exist have existed for about a century.

Depictions of scenes from ‘’Sang Sinxay’’ in Isan

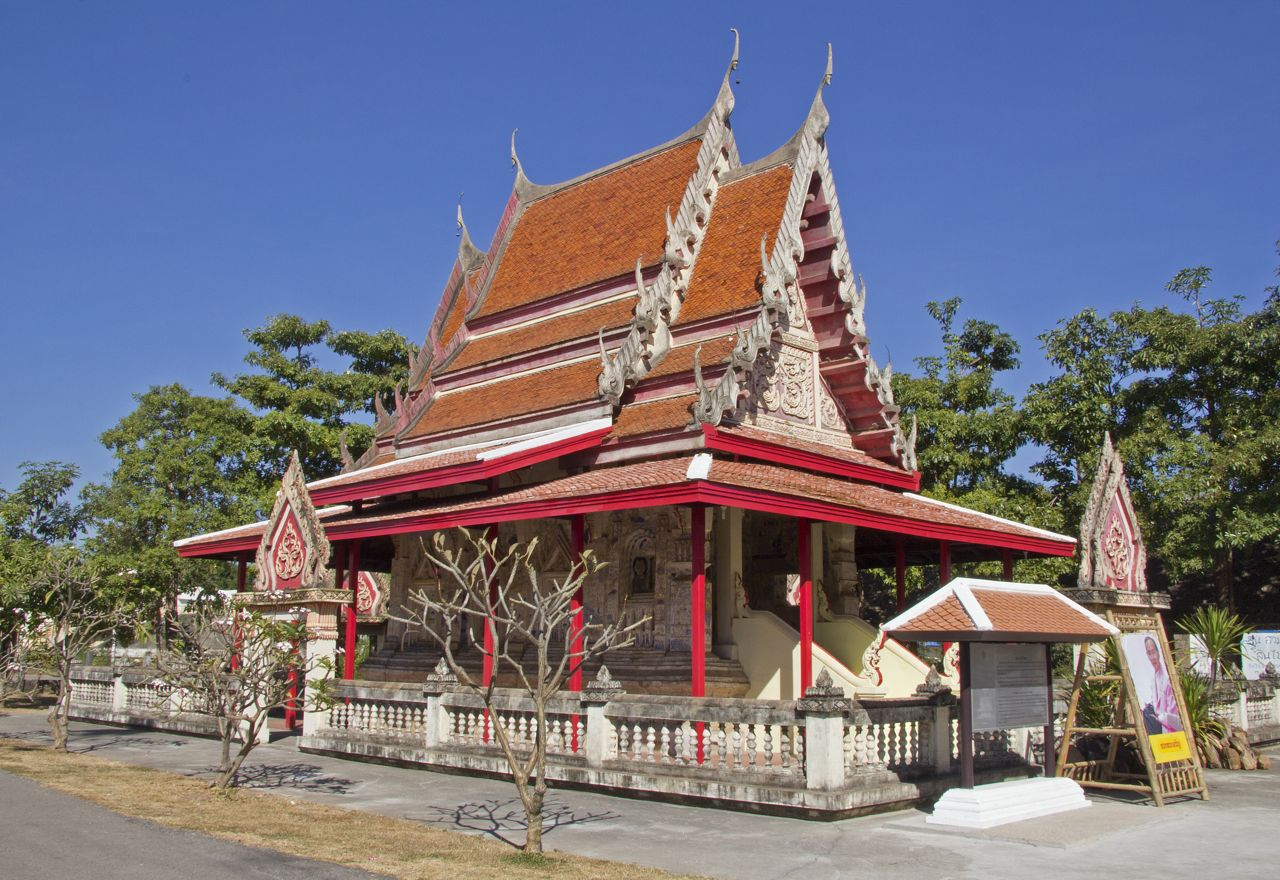
Wat Chaisi, with the historical marker stating the temple was proclaimed Ancient Monument by the King.

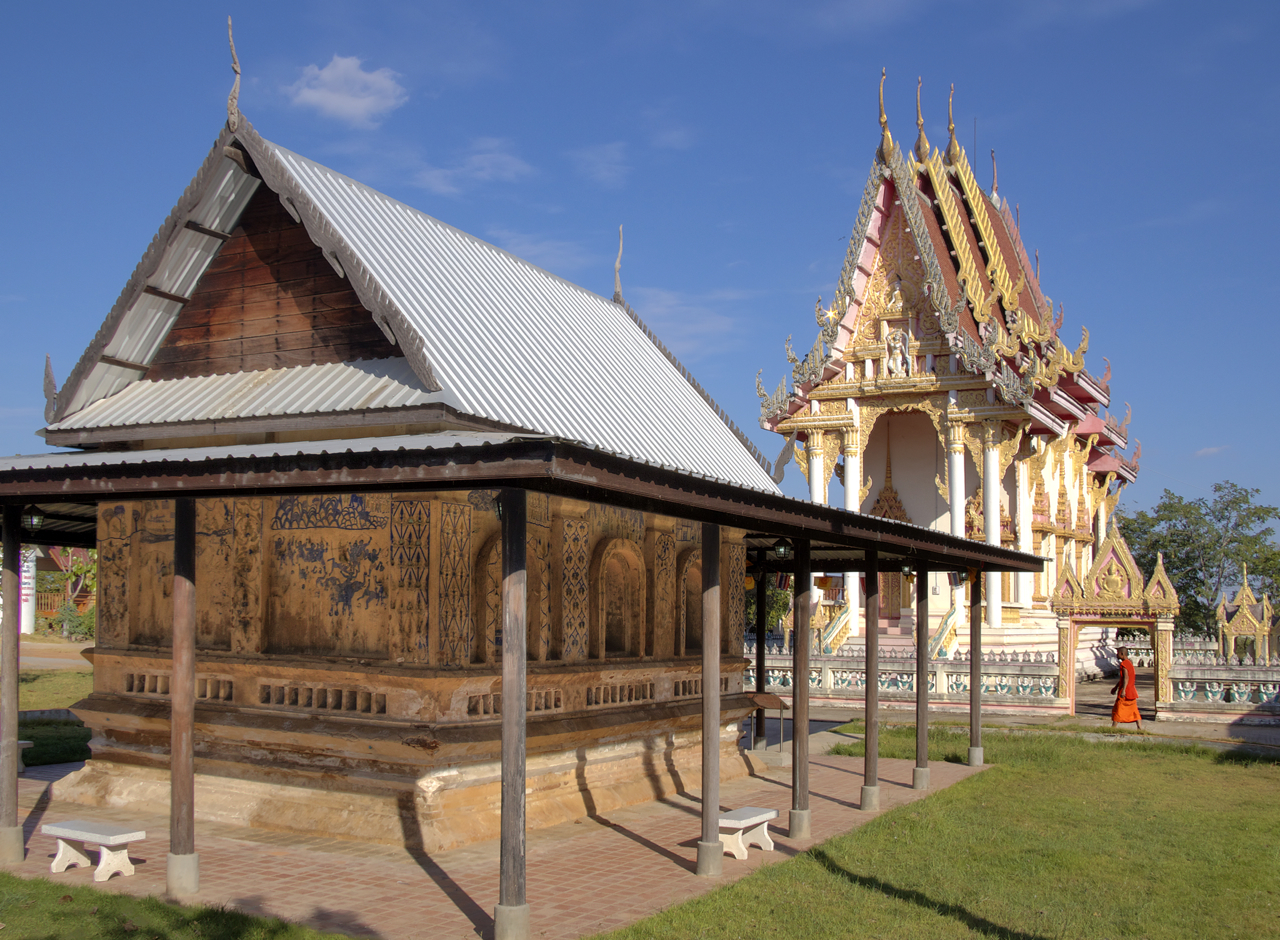
Wat Sanuan Wari

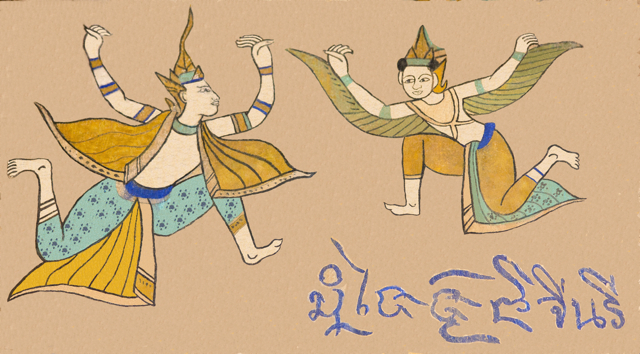
Depiction of Sinxay and Kiengkham dancing at Wat Sanuan Wari.

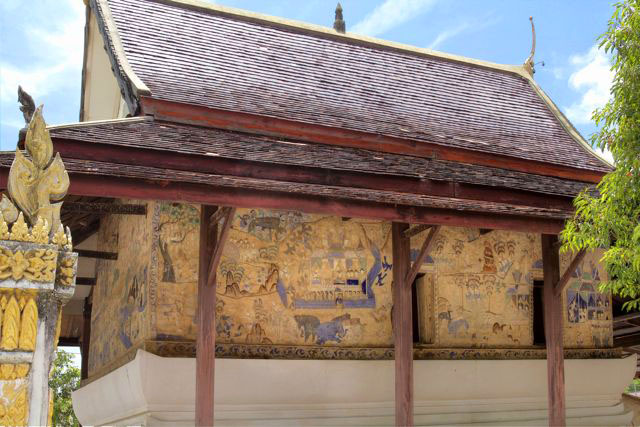
Outside wall of the Wat Photaram temple.

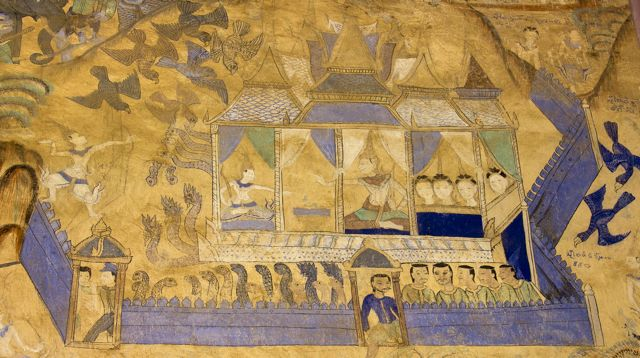
Detail of a mural at Wat Photaram, depicting Sinxay playing chess with Nak Valoonarat.

=== In Cambodia ===
The tale of Sang Sinxay also appears as an ancient theatrical form in Cambodian literature known as sastra lbaeng, with the name Sang Selachey or Saing Selchey. According to scholars of Khmer classical literature, the tale was written in Khmer by Oknha Vongsa Thipadei Ouk in 1887. In the 1930s, Saing Selchey was "one of the most popular bassac plots" in Cambodia. First in 1962 and 1966 with 6000 exemplaries, the Buddhist Institute transcribed the sastra and printed a new copy of Saing Selchey. In 1986 Minister of Culture Chheng Phon sponsored a special performance of Saing Selchey as part of his effort to promote the cultural renaissance of Cambodia after the devastation caused by the Khmer Rouge. Since the 1990s, NGOs have adapted the form to spread information about AIDS, sex trafficking and domestic violence. In the 1999, Saing Selchey was played on stage again starring acots such as Chek Mach and attracting thousand of spectators.

== Translations ==
Mahasila Viravong began translating his original version of Sang Sinxay, written in an older version of Lao, into a modern Lao version, titled just Sinxay, in the 1980s. He died before finishing the translation, which was completed by his son-in-law, Outhine Bounyavong, and published in 1991. A translation into Thai by Pricha Phinthong was published in 1981.

The poem was first translated into French by Nhouy Abhay and Pierre Somchinne Nginn in 1965, under the title Sinsay: chef-d’oeuvre de la littérature lao. Another translation into French by Dominique Menguy, based on the 1991 modern Lao version, was published in two volumes in 2003 and 2004 under the name Sinxay: L’épopée de Pangkham.

The authors of Sinsay: chef-d’oeuvre de la littérature lao used their translation as the basis for an English version, titled The Sinsay of Pangkham and published in 1965. An abridged version of the poem was included in 1981 in Treasures of Lao Literature by Samsanouk Mixai.

== See also ==
- Jataka tales
- Literature of Laos
- Theravada Buddhism
