= List of power stations in Thailand =

This page lists power generating plants in Thailand.

== Non-renewable ==
Power plant	Province	Coordinates	Fuel	Capacity (MW)	Operator	Notes
Mae Moh	Lampang	18°17′46″N 99°45′7″E	Coal (lignite)	2400	EGAT	
BLCP	Rayong	12°38′38″N 101°9′40″E	Coal	1434	Banpu	Map Ta Phut Industrial Estate
Krabi Coal Plant	Krabi		Coal	800	EGAT	Pre-permit
Thap Sakae	Prachuap Khiri Khan		Coal	3,200	EGAT	Cancelled
Thepha	Songkhla		Coal	2,200	EGAT	Pre-permit
Krabi	Krabi		Mix (natural gas, fuel oil)	340	EGAT	
Surat Thani	Surat Thani		Mix (natural gas, diesel)	244	EGAT	
North Bangkok (Block 1)	Nonthaburi		Natural gas	704	EGAT	
Bang Pakong (Blocks 1-5)	Chachoengsao		Mix (fuel oil, natural gas, diesel)	4385	EGAT	
South Bangkok (Blocks 1-3)	Samut Prakan		Natural gas	1691	EGAT	
Nam Phong (Blocks 1-2)	Khon Kaen		Natural gas	710	EGAT	
Chana	Songkhla		Natural gas	731	EGAT	
Lan Krabue	Kamphaeng Phet		Natural gas	150	EGAT	
Wang Noi	Ayutthaya		Mix (natural gas, diesel)	2027	EGAT	
Mae Hong Son	Mae Hong Son		Diesel	4.4		
Tha Chana	Surat Thani		Nuclear	0		Proposed
Khanom	Nakhon Si Thammarat		Nuclear	0		Proposed
Sichon	Nakhon Si Thammarat		Nuclear	0		Proposed
Khlong Yai	Trat		Nuclear	0		Proposed
Tha Tako	Nakhon Sawan		Nuclear	0		Proposed
Gulf Tasit 3 (GTS3)	Rayong		Natural gas	129.9	Gulf Energy Development	
Bang Bo	Samut Prakan		Natural gas / #2 diesel backup	350	Eastern Power EPEC	COD 2003

== Renewable ==
Power plant	Province	Coordinates	Fuel	Capacity (MW)	Operator	Notes
Saraff Energies Co., Ltd	Krabi		Biomass	12		
Chiang Rai power stations	Chiang Rai		Biomass	1		
Lopburi power stations	Lopburi		Biomass	7.5		
Chachoengsao power stations	Chachoengsao		Biomass	?		
Ubon Ratchathani power stations	Ubon Ratchathani		Biomass	?		
Siriwattana Green Power Co., Ltd			Biomass	9.9		
Surin power stations	Surin		Biomass	?		
Roi Et power stations	Roi Et		Biomass	?		
Chumphon power stations	Chumphon		Biomass	?		
Yala power stations	Yala		Biomass	?		
Trang power stations	Trang		Biomass	5.3		
Fang Geothermal Power Plant	Chiang Mai		Geothermal	0.3		
San Kamphaeng	Chiang Mai		Geothermal			
Mae Chan	Chiang Rai		Geothermal			
Wiang Pa Pao	Chiang Rai		Geothermal			
Wang Chin	Phrae		Geothermal			
Korat Wind Farm	Nakhon Ratchasima	15°11′37″N 101°27′9″E	Wind	207		
Laem Chabang Wind Farm		13°4′14″N 100°53′59″E	Wind	200		
Chaiyaphum Wind Farm	Chaiyaphum	15°33′17″N 101°34′12″E	Wind	80		
Phetchabun Wind Farm		16°43′53″N 100°59′22″E	Wind	60		
Nakhon Si Thammarat Wind Farm		8°19′47″N 100°12′32″E	Wind	20		
Phrom Thep Cape	Phuket		Wind	20		
Lam Takhong	Nakhon Ratchasima		Wind	2.50		
Wayu Wind Farm	Nakhon Ratchasima		Wind	50	Wind Energy Development Co., Ltd	In progress
Ban Yang Dam			Hydro	0.13		
Ban Khun Klang Dam			Hydro	0.20		
Bang Lang Dam	Yala	6°9′23″N 101°16′25″E	Hydro	72		
Ban Santi			Hydro	1.28		
Bhumibol Dam	Tak	17°14′33″N 98°58′20″E	Hydro	749	EGAT	
Chulabhorn Dam	Chaiyaphum	16°32′10″N 101°39′0″E	Hydro	40		
Chao Phraya Dam	Chai Nat	15°9′29″N 100°10′48″E	Hydro	19		
Huai Kui Mang Dam			Hydro	0.10		
Huai Kum Dam	Chaiyaphum		Hydro	1.06		
Kaeng Krachan Dam	Phetchaburi	12°54′57″N 99°37′51″E	Hydro	12	EGAT	
Khlong Chong Klam Dam			Hydro	0.02		
Lam Takhong Pumped Storage Power Plant	Nakhon Ratchasima	14°51′54″N 101°33′37″E	Hydro	500	EGAT	
Mae Ngat Somboon Chon Dam	Chiang Mai	19°9′41″N 99°2′24″E	Hydro	9	EGAT	
Nam Pung Dam	Sakon Nakhon		Hydro	6	EGAT	
Pak Mun Dam	Ubon Ratchathani	15°16′55″N 105°28′06″E	Hydro	136	EGAT	
Rajjaprabha Dam	Surat Thani		Hydro	240		
Sirikit Dam	Uttaradit	17°45′50″N 100°33′48″E	Hydro	500	EGAT	
Srinagarind Dam	Kanchanaburi	14°24′31″N 99°07′42″E	Hydro	720	EGAT	
Sirindhorn Dam	Ubon Ratchatani	15°12′22″N 105°25′24″E	Hydro	36		
Tha Thung Na Dam	Kanchanaburi	14°14′1″N 99°14′9″E	Hydro	38		
Ubol Ratana Dam	Khon Kaen	16°46′31″N 102°37′05″E	Hydro	25.2		
Vajiralongkorn Dam	Kanchanaburi	14°47′58″N 98°35′49″E	Hydro	300		
Mae Wong Dam	Nakhon Sawan	15°55′1″N 99°19′39″E	Hydro			Proposed
Kaeng Suea Ten Dam	Phrae	18°36′0″N 100°9′0″E	Hydro			Proposed
Pakchom Dam			Hydro			Proposed
Ban Koum Dam			Hydro			Proposed
Lampang Solar Farm			Solar	90		
Phitsanulok Solar Farm			Solar	90		
Lopburi Solar Farm	Lopburi	15°3′6″N 100°53′32″E	Solar	55		
Khon Kaen Solar Farm			Solar	60		
Korat Solar Farm			Solar	54		
Nakhon Pathom Solar Farm	Nakhon Pathom		Solar	24		
San Kamphaeng Solar Power Plant	Chiang Mai		Solar			
Saraburi Solar Farm			Solar	22.5		
Buriram Solar Farm			Solar	18		
Surin Solar Farm			Solar	18		
Nakhon Phanom Solar Farm	Nakhon Phanom		Solar	18		
Sakon Nakhon Solar Farm			Solar	12		
Roi Et Solar Farm	Roi Et		Solar	12		
Nong Khai Solar Farm			Solar	6		
Udon Thani Solar Farm			Solar	6		
Ta Sang	Nakhon Sawan		Solar	7.6	G-Power Source Co., Ltd	

== See also ==
- Energy in Thailand
- Energy policy of Thailand
- Hydroelectricity in Thailand
- List of power stations in Asia
- List of largest power stations in the world
- Nuclear power in Thailand
- Solar power in Thailand
- Wind power in Thailand
