= Hydroelectricity in Thailand =

Thailand has set targets and policies for the development of its energy sector for 2035, with priority being given to indigenous renewable energy resources, including hydropower.

Hydropower in Thailand is the biggest form of renewable energy in Thailand, beating solar power in Thailand and wind power in Thailand, with a total capacity of over 7000 megawatts (MW) of hydropower generation capacity installed in 26 hydroelectric dams in the country. The biggest hydroelectric dam in Thailand is the Bhumibol Dam, which has eight turbines giving it a total capacity of 749 MW. The dam was opened in 1964 and is owned and operated by the Electricity Generating Authority of Thailand (EGAT). As of 2000, large-scale hydropower generation in Thailand had reached almost 3 gigawatts (GW), and development has since slowed as concerns were raised on environmental impacts of large hydropower plants. Generation from small-scale hydropower is rising at a modest rate.

Thailand also imports electricity produced by hydroelectric power stations in other countries. By September 2015, Thailand was importing 7% of the electricity it could produce. Electricity was being imported from Laos, Myanmar and China.

To complement Thailand's hydropower plants, EGAT plans to build floating solar-hydro projects on eight reservoir dams around the country, with a total planned capacity of 1 GW.

== List of Thailand hydroelectric power stations ==
Station	Capacity (MW)	Community	Coordinates	Status	Opening year
Ban Yang Dam	0.13			Operational	
Ban Khun Klang Dam	0.20			Operational	
Bang Lang Dam	72		6°9′23″N 101°16′25″E	Operational	1981
Ban Santi	1.28			Operational	
Bhumibol Dam	749		17°14′33″N 98°58′20″E	Operational	1964
Chulabhorn Dam	40		16°32′10″N 101°39′0″E	Operational	1972
Chao Phraya Dam	19		15°9′29″N 100°10′48″E	Operational	1957
Huai Kui Mang Dam	0.10			Operational	
Huai Kum Dam	1.06			Operational	1980
Kaeng Krachan Dam	12		12°54′57″N 99°37′51″E	Operational	1966
Khlong Chong Klam Dam	0.02			Operational	
Lam Takhong Pumped Storage Power Plant	500		14°51′54″N 101°33′37″E	Operational	2002
Mae Ngat Somboon Chon Dam	9		19°9′41″N 99°2′24″E	Operational	1986
Nam Pung Dam	6			Operational	1965
Pak Mun Dam	136		15°16′55″N 105°28′06″E	Operational	1994
Rajjaprabha Dam	240			Operational	1987
Sirikit Dam	500		17°45′50″N 100°33′48″E	Operational	1974
Srinagarind Dam	720		14°24′31″N 99°07′42″E	Operational	1980
Sirindhorn Dam	36		15°12′22″N 105°25′24″E	Operational	1971
Tha Thung Na Dam	38		14°14′1″N 99°14′9″E	Operational	1981
Ubol Ratana Dam	25.2		16°46′31″N 102°37′05″E	Operational	1966
Vajiralongkorn Dam	300		14°47′58″N 98°35′49″E	Operational	1984
Mae Wong Dam			15°55′1″N 99°19′39″E	Proposed	
Kaeng Suea Ten Dam			18°36′0″N 100°9′0″E	Proposed	
Pakchom Dam				Proposed	
Ban Koum Dam				Proposed	

== See also ==
- Renewable energy in Thailand
- Wind power in Thailand
- Solar power in Thailand
- Renewable energy by country
