= Rayong Power Plant =

Gas-fired combined-cycle power plant in Rayong Province, Thailand

Rayong Power Plant (Gulf PD Project)
- Country: Thailand
- Location: Map Yang Phon, Pluak Daeng District, Rayong Province
- Coordinates: 12°57′01″N 101°09′22″E
- Status: Operational
- Construction began: 2019
- Commission date: 2024 (Unit 1)
- Owners: Gulf PD Co., Ltd. (Gulf Energy Development 70%, Mitsui & Co. 30%)
- Operators: Gulf PD Co., Ltd.

The Rayong Power Plant, officially known as the Gulf PD Power Plant, is a large gas-fired combined-cycle independent power producer (IPP) facility located in Rayong Province, Thailand. The project forms part of a twin-site 5,300 MW development (Rayong + Chonburi) under Thailand's Eastern Economic Corridor (EEC) program, supplying power to the national grid through a long-term power purchase agreement (PPA) with the Electricity Generating Authority of Thailand (EGAT).

== Owner and operator ==
The plant is owned by Gulf PD Company Limited, a joint venture between:

- Gulf Energy Development Public Company Limited (70%)
- Mitsui & Co., Ltd. (30%)

Engineering, procurement and construction (EPC) is led by Mitsubishi Power Ltd. and local contractor Italian-Thai Development Public Company Limited (ITD).

== Capacity and technology ==
The Rayong site comprises four combined-cycle gas turbine units, each about 662.5 MW (≈ 2,650 MW total). Together with its sister project in Chonburi (Gulf SRC Power Plant, ≈ 2,650 MW), the combined complex provides ≈ 5,300 MW, one of Southeast Asia's largest CCGT installations.

- Technology: Mitsubishi M701JAC gas turbines with Heat Recovery Steam Generators (HRSGs) and steam turbines.
- Fuel: Natural gas (primary); distillate fuel (backup).

== Commissioning and operations ==
Commercial operation of the first 662.5 MW unit began in October 2024, followed by sequential commissioning of remaining units through 2025–2026 under a 25-year PPA with EGAT.

== Finances ==
The project investment totals approximately US$1.74 billion, financed by a consortium led by the Japan Bank for International Cooperation (JBIC) and co-financed by Japanese and Thai commercial banks including Mizuho Bank and MUFG Bank. The plant operates under Thailand's Independent Power Producer (IPP) framework with a 25-year PPA with EGAT.

== Environmental and community impact ==
The plant underwent a full Environmental and Social Impact Assessment (ESIA) approved by the Office of Natural Resources and Environmental Policy and Planning (ONEP) and reviewed by the Asian Development Bank (ADB). Mitigation measures address air quality, water use, noise, and community health, in compliance with Thai and IFC environmental standards. Community-benefit programs include infrastructure upgrades, scholarships, and vocational training supporting Thailand's EEC industrial workforce.

== Green-energy and efficiency features ==
Using the M701JAC turbine platform, the plant achieves ≈ 63% thermal efficiency, reducing CO₂ emissions per MWh by around 10% compared to older CCGT plants. It contributes to Thailand's Power Development Plan (PDP2018 Rev 1, PDP2024 draft) targets for higher efficiency and lower emissions.

== Future expansion ==
Plans include potential integration of hydrogen-ready gas turbines and battery-energy storage systems (BESS) to enhance grid flexibility by the late 2020s.

== See also ==
- List of power stations in Thailand
- Electricity Generating Authority of Thailand
- Energy Regulatory Commission of Thailand
- Eastern Economic Corridor (Thailand)
- Energy in Thailand
