= Saraburi Gas Turbine =

Gas-fired combined-cycle power plants in Saraburi Province, Thailand

The term Saraburi Gas Turbine Power Plant is commonly used to describe major gas-fired combined-cycle power stations located in Saraburi Province, Thailand, notably Kaeng Khoi 2 (≈1,468 MW) and Nong Saeng (≈1,600 MW). Both facilities operate as independent power producer (IPP) projects under long-term power purchase agreements with the Electricity Generating Authority of Thailand (EGAT) and supply the Central Region grid.

== Location ==
Both plants are in Saraburi Province (central Thailand). Kaeng Khoi 2 is sited in Ban Pa/Kaeng Khoi area; Nong Saeng is in Nong Kop/Nong Saeng area.

== Capacity and Technology ==
Kaeng Khoi 2: two blocks of 734 MW each (≈1,468 MW total), gas-fired combined cycle (CCGT). Commercial operation dates: May 2007 (Block 1) and March 2008 (Block 2).

Nong Saeng: 1,600 MW (800 MW × 2) CCGT, with units scheduled to enter service June 2014 and December 2014 per EPC notices; project financing documentation confirms 1,600 MW and a 25-year PPA with EGAT.

== Owner and Operator ==
Kaeng Khoi 2 is developed and operated by Gulf Power Generation Company Limited (GPG) under a Build-Own-Operate scheme; J-POWER reports a 49% investment share in the project company and confirms the 25-year PPA with EGAT.

Nong Saeng is developed by Gulf JP NS Co., Ltd. (GNS) with international co-financing; JBIC's project finance release confirms the sponsor structure and PPA with EGAT.

== Operations ==
The plant operates under Thailand's Independent Power Producer (IPP) framework:

Fuel: primary natural gas; dual-fuel capability (e.g., distillate) is available for reliability.

Grid offtake: electricity is sold to EGAT under long-term PPAs (25 years cited for Kaeng Khoi 2 and Nong Saeng).

Performance upgrades (Saraburi gas turbines): case studies report gas-turbine inlet-air cooling retrofits on two GE 6561B turbines in Saraburi, adding ≈4.3 MW per unit (≈8.6 MW total) during high-temperature conditions.

== Finances ==
Kaeng Khoi 2: Total project cost ~ 36.1 billion Baht (≈108.1 billion yen).

Nong Saeng: Project financing up to US$1.184 billion arranged by JBIC alongside co-financing; EPC by Mitsubishi Heavy Industries for two 800 MW trains with scheduled CODs in 2014.

== Environmental and “Green Energy” aspects ==
While gas-fired CCGT plants are fossil-fuel facilities, higher thermal efficiency means lower CO₂ intensity per MWh compared with older thermal units. Thailand-focused studies (JCM/Ministry of the Environment, Japan) describe inlet-air cooling/chiller retrofits as efficiency measures that can increase net output and reduce emissions per kWh.

== Related Facilities in Saraburi ==
Kaeng Khoi 2 (≈1,468 MW CCGT).

Nong Saeng (≈1,600 MW CCGT).

Nong Khae (NK2) SPP (≈133 MW gas-fired SPP in Saraburi; distinct from the above IPPs).

== See also ==
Energy in Thailand

Electricity Generating Authority of Thailand

Energy Regulatory Commission (Thailand)

List of power stations in Thailand
