= Wind power in Thailand =

Wind power in Thailand generates 2% of the nations energy and accounts for 3% of installed capacity. Wind power in Thailand amounted to an installed production capacity of 224.5 MW as of the end of 2014. Installed capacity was 112 MW at the end of 2012, with 111 MW added in 2013, and a minor amount added in 2014. This ranked Thailand 46th in the world by installed capacity as of 2015.

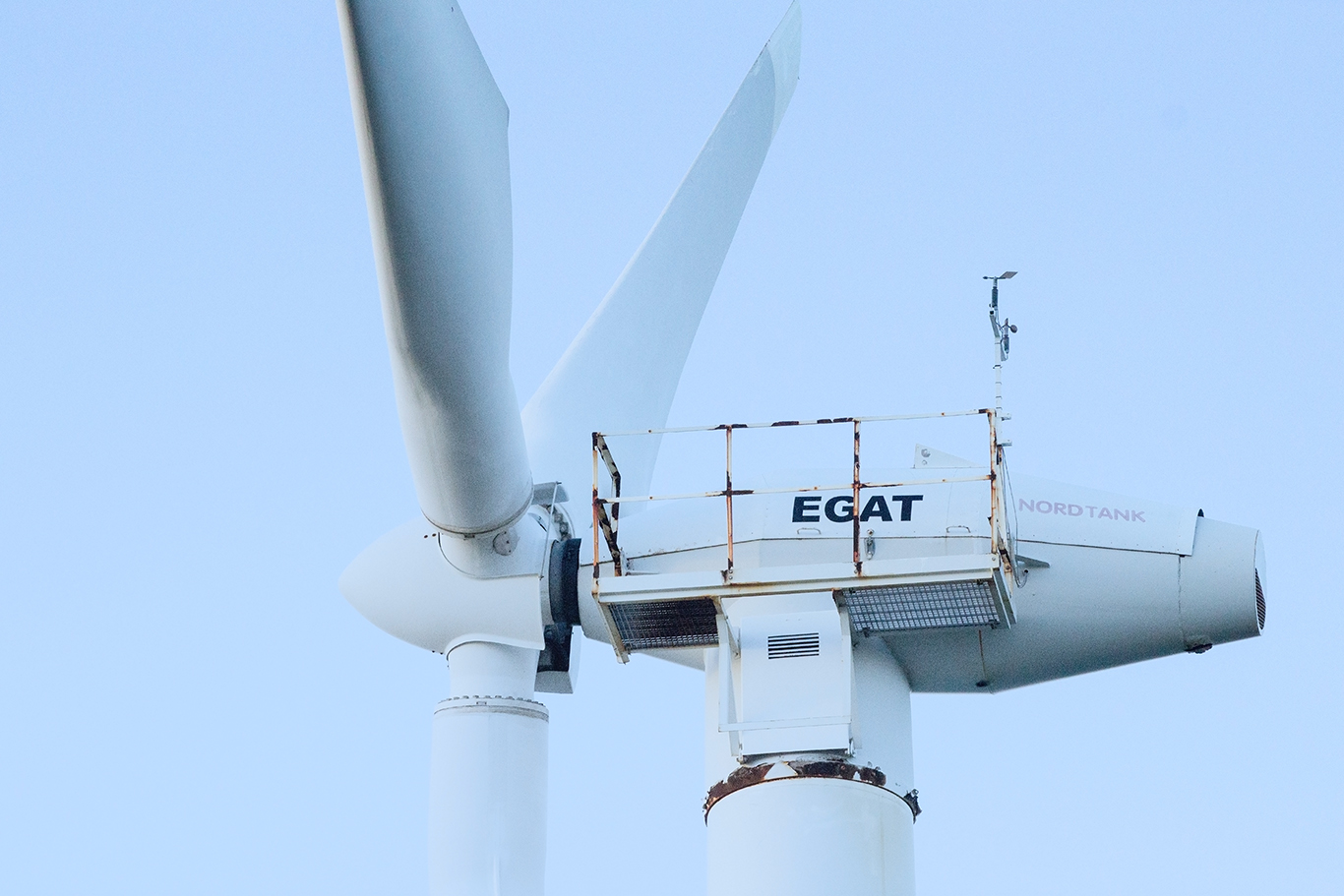
Wind turbine at Laem Phromthep, Phuket from a pilot project by EGAT

Thailand's natural gas reserves are projected to run out in 2021, and Thailand began importing expensive liquefied natural gas in 2011. These factors have led to increased demand for renewable energy, and Thailand's Alternative Energy Development Plan (AEDP) in 2011 called for 25 percent of its energy to come from renewable sources by 2036. By June 2012, projects totalling over 1,600 MW had been proposed.

== History ==
With increasing demand for energy, Thailand found itself dependent on energy imported from other countries, mainly oil and natural gas. This, along with repeated occurrence of oil crises, raised awareness of renewable energy since The Fifth National Economic and Social Development Plan (1983-1987). The support for renewable energy became clear when the National Energy Policy Council Act was declared in 1992. The act started the energy conservation plan, which aimed to decrease the amount of imported energy by developing renewable energy sources in Thailand, including wind power.

=== Wind resources mapping ===
The first study of Thai wind energy potential was conducted in 1975 by the Department of Energy Development and Promotion, which is now called the Department of Alternative Energy Development and Efficiency (DEDE). Data of mean wind speed from the Thai Meteorological Department (TMD) was used to produce a wind map of areas with medium to high potential. Later, in 1981, King Mongkut's Institute of Technology Thonburi (KMITT) and King Mongkut's Institute of Technology North Bangkok (KMITNB), in cooperation with Electricity Generating Authority of Thailand (EGAT), produced another wind resource map with 13 year-long data (1966-1978) from 53 wind speed measurement stations of the TMD, using power law to standardize all wind speed to 10 m. In 1984, another similar attempt was carried out by KMITT, using 17 year-long (1966-1982) data from 62 measurement stations, and with financial support from USAID.

Attempts at producing wind resource maps of Thailand all faced the problem of shortage in wind speed data, especially offshore and at high elevations. This resulted in maps with low coverage. In 2001, another set of wind resource maps was produced by DEDE using data from over 150 measurement stations including offshore stations and high elevation stations. The data was processed using computer simulation and mathematical modelling, and the map and data were also published in electronic form. In the same year, the World Bank offered another set of wind resource maps for four countries: Cambodia, Laos, Vietnam, and Thailand, which was calculated from global wind data and each country's geographical data using computer simulations.

In 2008, wind speed data in southern Thailand was further calibrated with the setup of more stations in six provinces of southern Thailand. Southern Thailand was shown in previous studies to have the highest wind energy potential in Thailand. The stations were installed to measure wind speeds at 80, 90, and 100 m heights. Also, from 2007 to 2009 wind speed and direction were measured and recorded from several stations in the northern Thailand.

In 2011, research to improve the wind map was conducted by the Department of Physics of Silpakorn University. The research produced mesoscale wind maps with resolution of 3x3 km^{2} cells using atmospheric model and computer simulation software, and also experimented with the making of microscale wind maps, which could be the next step in the study of Thai wind energy potential.

=== Wind turbines ===
In 1983, Thailand had its first set of electricity generating wind turbines, consisting of six turbines, installed at Laem Phromthep in Phuket Province by EGAT as a pilot project. The generated electricity was used to power nearby research stations. The outcome was satisfying, so in 1988 EGAT planned to connect the turbines to the power grid of the Provincial Electricity Authority (PEA), and in 1990 they started operating. This was the first time Thailand had electricity generated by wind power supplying the power grid. Later, in 1992, two more turbines with 10 kW of capacity were installed and connected to the grid.

Later, both government and private organizations, especially educational institutes, had more interest in the potential in wind power in Thailand. In 1996, KMUTT was the first organization to install 2.5 kW and 10 kW wind turbines at Phu Kradueng National Park in Loei Province, and Tarutao National Marine Park in Satun Province. Later in the same year, the Recycle Engineering Company Limited installed one 150 kW wind turbine at its facility at Ko Chang District in Chonburi Province, becoming Thailand's first private wind turbine.

On the government side, in 2007, DEDE installed wind turbine of 250 kW capacity at Hua Sai District in Nakhon Si Thammarat Province, and later in 2009, another of 1.5 MW capacity. Also in 2009, two wind turbines of 1.25 MW capacity each were installed by EGAT at the upper reservoir of Lam Takhong Cholapawattana power plant, a hydroelectric power plant in Sikhio District, Nakhon Ratchasima Province, becoming Thailand's first large electricity-generating wind power plant.

== Wind resources ==
Thailand has relatively low average wind speeds with most areas being of class 1-1.4 wind speed, or about 2.8–4 m/s measured at 10 m. This is because Thailand is near the equator which has generally low wind speed. In general, Thailand's inland winds are sub-par, but there are areas with topography such as mountain ranges, canyons, and slopes that help increase wind speeds.

A study conducted in 2001 for the World Bank found limited potential for large-scale wind power in Thailand. On a land area basis, only 761 km^{2} or 0.2 percent of Thailand's land mass was found to have "good to excellent" winds. Prospects for small-scale village wind power were found to be more promising. Seventy-three percent of the rural population lived in areas with "fair to good" wind resources.

Nevertheless, Thailand still has some areas with utilizable wind speeds of no less than class 3, that is, with no lower than 6.4 m/s annual average wind speed. This is caused by the two monsoons that affect Thailand annually, the northeast monsoon and the southwest monsoon. The northeast monsoon comes from the South China Sea during the period between November and March, producing strong wind in the Gulf of Thailand and the coastal areas of southern Thailand. The southwest monsoon comes from the Indian Sea between May and October, producing strong wind at the peaks of mountain ranges in the west part of upper southern and lower northern Thailand.

For offshore wind, there are some areas with high wind speeds in Bandon Bay in Surat Thani Province, Pattani Gulf in Songkhla, and Pattani Province, and Songkhla Lake (actually a lagoon) in Songkhla Province.

== Capacity and production ==
As of 2019 Thailand has 1.5 GW of onshore wind installed. The country has the onshore technical potential of 13-17 GW. The Thai wind power industry is confident it can deliver wind projects at below three baht per kWh. In December 2019, the Global Wind Energy Council (GWEC), the Thailand Wind Energy Association (ThaiWEA), and US Agency for International Development (USAID) joined forces in Bangkok to hold the first Thailand Wind Energy Roundtable.

Thai production of wind energy (MW)
2010	2011	2012	2013	2014
5.6	7.3	111.7	222.7	224.5

List of wind farms in Thailand (as of May 2015)
Name	Capacity (KW)
Theppana Wind Farm	6,900
First Korat Wind	103,500
K.R. Two	103,500
Lamtakhong	2,500
Chang Hua Man	50
Samut Green Energy	900
Ko Tao	250
DEDE (Wind Energy for Generation)	15,000
Tha-le Pang (Hua Sai)	250
Sating Phra	1,500
Laem Phromthep	192
Total	234,542

As of the end of 2014, Thailand's wind power capacity stood at 224.5 MW, generating 305 GWh of energy throughout the year. This ranks Thailand 46th in the world by wind power capacity.

The spikes in increase in capacity in 2012 and 2013 were caused by the construction of "First Korat Wind" wind farm and "K.R. Two" wind farm by Wind Energy Holding Co., Ltd., founded by Nopporn Suppipat, in each year, respectively. Each wind farm is composed of 45 wind turbines, each with 2.3 MW capacity, resulting in wind farms with highest capacities in Southeast Asia.

== Future plans ==
The latest plan to develop alternative energy in Thailand is the Alternative Energy Development Plan (AEDP). The plan aims to increase the share of renewable energy in the total energy production to 25 percent. The share of renewable energy stands at 11.91 percent as of 2014.

Formerly, the AEDP was planned to span 2012 to 2021 and to employ an Adder system: subsidies for independent sales of wind power from small and very small power producers, aiming to promote electricity generation from wind power. However, under the lead of Prime Minister General Prayut Chan-o-cha, the plan was revised to span 2015 to 2036. FiT (Feed-in-tariff) system is used instead of Adder, which calculates sales price of energy from real development cost of the energy producer, but with premium extra rate of 0.50 baht/kWh for the southern border provinces. This prevents the price of energy from increasing too much.

Also, Energy Absolute Public Company Limited, headed by Somphote Ahunai, is constructing three wind farm projects in Nakhon Si Thammarat Province with combined installed capacity of 126 MW. It also plans to start construction of five more projects in 2017 in Chaiyaphum Province, northeast Thailand, which will produce 260 MW of electricity. As of 2012, total capacity of proposed big scale wind farm projects that are accepted by the government amounts to 787.37 MW, with 1674.20 MW more yet to be confirmed.

== Economics ==
=== Cost of production ===
According to a research study by King Mongkut's University of Technology Thonburi, the cost of wind energy production in Thailand ranges from about 2-6 baht/kWh, but in some unsuitable areas the cost can be as high as 11 baht/kWh. When compared to the cost of production in Denmark at about 45 øre (about 2.36 baht) /kWh, Thailand's cost is relatively higher. But with PEA buying electricity with FiT system at the typical rate of about six baht/kWh, production by very small power producers (VSPP) is possible.

=== Investment ===
As a result of the government's continuous supporting policy, renewable energy consumption has grown dramatically. This leads to an increase in investments from private organizations in renewable energy industry. Most recently in 2014, combined net value of investment in renewable energy both from the government and private organizations amounted to 84,588 million baht. Of this amount, the wind energy industry received the highest proportion of the investment, amounting to 25,720 million baht or 30.4 percent of total investment.

== See also ==
- Energy in Thailand
- Solar power in Thailand
- Hydroelectricity in Thailand
- Renewable energy in Thailand
- Renewable energy by country
