= Solar power in Thailand =

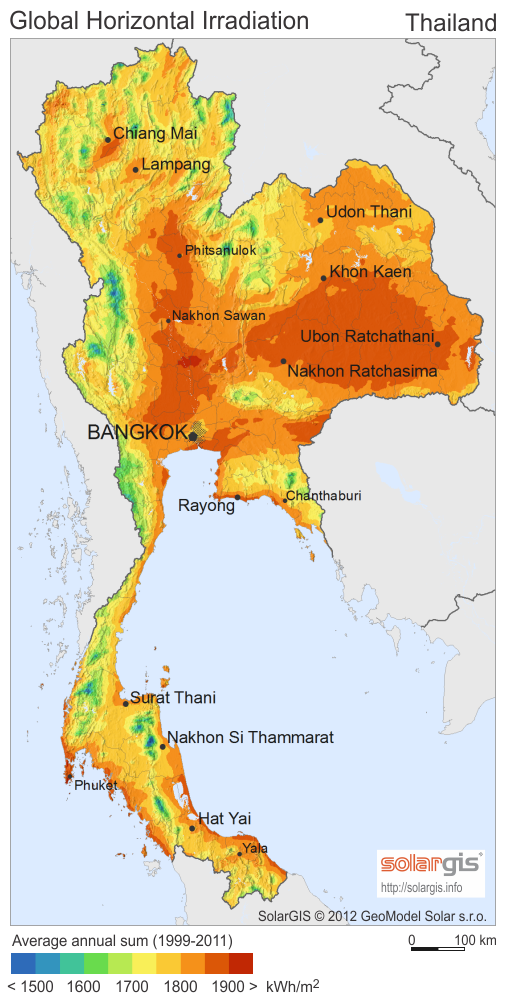
Solar potential

Solar power in Thailand reached installed capacity of 6.84 GW in 2025. Rapid growth in the sector brought a doubling of capacity over just two years, and the country passed its 2036 goal eleven years early, a target of 6 GW set in 2012. As of 2025, solar power makes up around 3% of Thailand's electricity generation. Thailand has the second-most solar power capacity in Southeast Asia, after Vietnam.

Thailand has great solar potential, especially the southern and northern parts of the northeastern region of Udon Thani Province and certain areas in the central region. Around 14.3% of the country has a daily solar exposure of around 19–20 MJ/m^{2}/day, while another 50% of the country gains around 18–19 MJ/m^{2}/day. In terms of solar potential, Thailand lags behind the US, but is ahead of Japan.

The 84 MW Lopburi Solar Farm was completed in May 2013. German solar energy company Conergy signed a contract with Thailand's Siam Solar Energy to construct three solar plants of 10.5 MW each in addition to existing two solar plants that have been under construction since autumn 2012.

In 2021, the world’s largest hybrid solar-hydropower project, the Sirindhorn floating solar farm, commenced operations.

== Power purchase scheme ==
In January 2015, Thailand's Energy Regulatory Commission (ERC) announced a new regulation for the purchase of electricity from ground-mounted solar projects, replacing the "adder" scheme with the "feed-in-tariff" (FiT) scheme. The regulation aims to revive the investment in renewable energy projects in Thailand after a quiet period in the renewable energy sector in 2014. There are over one hundred projects, with a total capacity of 1,000 MW, whose applications have not yet been accepted under the adder scheme and therefore are eligible for the feed-in-tariff scheme.

== Statistics ==
Daily insolation in Bangkok with an average of 5.04 hours of sun per day

Photovoltaics - deployment
Year	Cumulative capacity (MW_{p})				Annual installations (MW_{p})			
	On-grid (distributed)	On-grid (centralized)	Off-grid	Total	On-grid (distributed)	On-grid (centralized)	Off-grid	Total
2005	-	1.77	22.11	23.88	-	0.01	-	13.05
2006	-	1.86	28.66	30.52	-	0.09	6.55	6.64
2007	-	3.61	28.90	32.51	-	1.75	0.24	1.99
2008	-	4.05	29.34	33.39	-	0.44	7.23	0.88
2009	-	13.68	29.49	43.17	-	9.63	0.15	9.78
2010	-	19.57	29.65	49.22	-	5.89	7.54	6.05
2011	-	212.28	29.88	242.68	-	192.71	0.23	193.46
2012	-	357.38	30.19	387.57	-	145.10	8.08	144.89
2013	-	793.73	29.73	823.46	-	436.35	-0.46^{a}	435.89
2014	-	1,268.78	29.15	1,298.51	-	475.05	7.04	475.05
2015	-	1,389.55	30.03	1,419.58	-	120.77	0.88	121.07
2016	129.68	2,282.64	33.80	2,446.12	129.68	893.09	11.69	1,026.54
2017	359.79	2,663.12	34.14	3,057.05	230.11	380.48	0.34	610.93
2018	598.86	2,827.05	11.43	3,437.34	239.07	163.93	-10.68^{a}	380.29
Source: IEA-PVPS, Annual Report 2015 (AR2015), National Survey report of PV applications in Thailand Notes:^{a} Some of the off-grid systems were dismantled.

Cumulative capacity – total installed PV capacity in megawatts since 2005
Annual installations – annually installed PV capacity in megawatts since 2005

== See also ==
- Renewable energy
- Solar power
- Photovoltaics
- Solar power by country
- Photovoltaic system
- Photovoltaic power station
- Growth of photovoltaics
- Wind power in Thailand
- Hydroelectricity in Thailand
- Renewable energy in Thailand
- Renewable energy by country
