= Nuclear power in Thailand =

Thailand has no nuclear power stations. The Thai Energy Ministry periodically considers plans for nuclear power.

== Power demand ==
In 2011, Pricha Karasuddhi, technical adviser for the Nuclear Power Programme Development Office stated that power demand will double in the next 12 years. According to him, if the government goes for nuclear power, it must make a decision to do so now to pave the way for preparation. It is crucial to put this on the national agenda, again, according to him, to draw participation from all parties involved and debate the merits of Thai nuclear energy. According to the Electricity Generating Authority of Thailand, daily demand for electricity hit 10 new peaks last year. The latest was registered on 10 May 2010 at 24,009 MW, higher than the record of 22,044 MW on 24 April 2009 - due to higher temperatures and economic recovery. EGAT is worried about power blackouts or brownouts in the next 10 years when demand rises against a limited increase in new supply.

Nuclear power is expected to reduce Thailand's natural gas consumption in power generation from 70 percent to 40 percent. Figures from 2007 reveal that Thailand used natural gas to generate electricity more than any energy source at 66.2 percent, followed by lignite at 12.6 percent. Hydro power accounted for 5.5 percent, bunker oil 2.7 percent, diesel 0.03 percent and renewable energy 1.6 percent. Imported coal accounted for 8.4 percent, while purchased electricity from Laos and Malaysia was at three percent.

Others suggest that power demand can adequately be supplied by cheaper and safer eco-energies.

== Fukushima 1 response ==
Following the Fukushima nuclear disaster, on 14 March 2011, Prime Minister Abhisit Vejjajiva ordered the Energy Ministry to review its plan to establish five nuclear power plants. The ministry has been instructed to study two issues in detail:

- Emergency measures and nuclear plants
- Potential as terrorist targets

Concern is mounting given the problems in Japan, if Thailand is to adopt the Japanese model.

As of 2012, the Thai Energy Ministry is drafting a plan that could see a nuclear facility go into operation in 2026.

== Protests ==
On 3 November 2009 anti-nuclear plant protesters in the Tha Chana District of Surat Thani Province dispersed, but demanded the electricity authority carry out a public hearing before proceeding with the construction plan. More than 500 protesters trespassed into a meeting room of the Tha Chana District office in Surat Thani Province while representatives from the Electricity Generating Authority of Thailand (EGAT) were giving a presentation about a site survey for a nuclear power plant in the area.

On 15 March 2011 about 2,000 people from 18 districts of Kalasin Province rallied outside the city hall to protest against the EGAT plan to build a nuclear plant in their province. Banners were raised to denounce some MPs in the province for having asked EGAT to build a nuclear plant in the province and claiming that it was the wish of the people. MPs claimed the people agreed to having the nuclear plant at public hearings which in fact had never been held, they said. The protesters said groundwork for the construction of a nuclear plant had been underway near Non Somboon village in tambon Hua Hin of Kalasin's Huay Mek District. The construction site is less than 10 km from the Lam Pao River, the lifeline of Kalasin.

On 26 March 2011, a poll conducted by Assumption University reported that more than 80 percent of the respondents (83.4 percent) disagreed with the plan to construct nuclear power plants in Thailand. The poll involved 3,807 peopled aged 18 up in 17 provinces, was conducted from 1-25 March 2011. Bangkok residents had the largest percentage of the objection of 95.2 percent followed by those in the southern region (91.5 percent), central (91.1 percent), north (90.0 percent), and northeast (85.8 percent). The poll was conducted during the Fukushima I nuclear accidents in Japan.

== See also ==
- Energy in Thailand
- Nuclear power
