= Renewable energy in Thailand =

Renewable energy in Thailand is a developing sector that addresses the country's present high rate of carbon emissions and energy security risks. Thailand still relies heavily on fossil fuels, with renewables accounting for one fifth of the country's energy generation in 2024. The major source of renewable energy in Thailand is biomass (95%), with hydro, solar, and wind power making up small additional contributions.

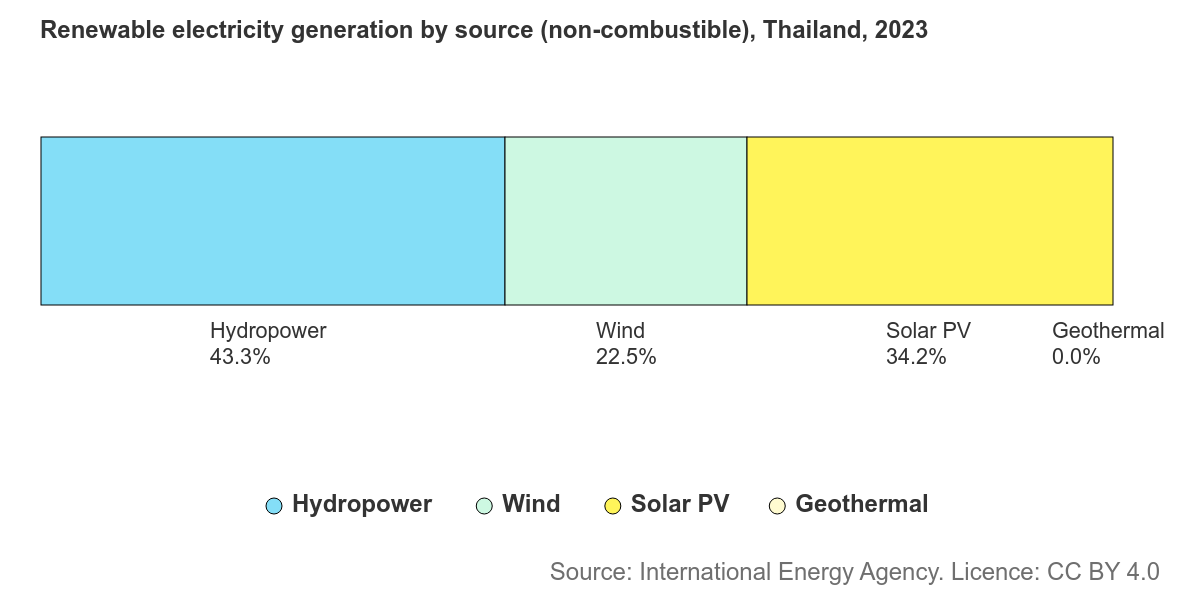
Thailand's renewable electricity generation by source (non-combustible) in 2023.

Policies such as the Thirteenth National Economic and Social Development Plan (2023-2027) and the Alternative Energy Development Plan (2018-2037), set future goals for increasing the capacity of renewable energy and reduce the reliance of nonrenewable energy. The government aims to increase the use of renewables to 51% of energy generation by 2037, which could save over $9 billion every year. The Thai government also wants all new cars sold to be electric by the year 2035.

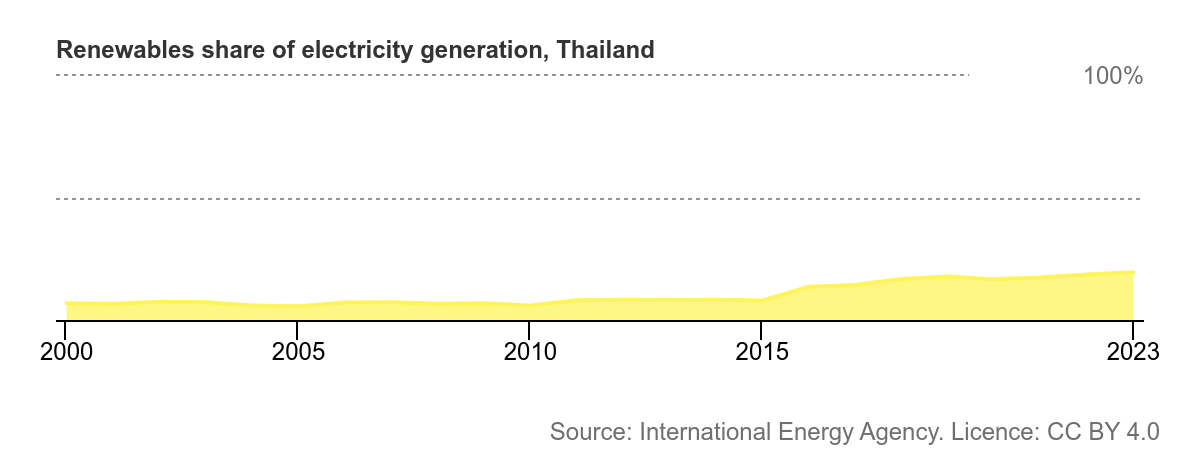
Share of Thai electricity generation from renewables since 2000.

Total energy generating capacity for renewables has doubled since 2012, a trend that should continue with policy support. Solar power will likely play a central role in Thailand's energy transition due to the country's tropical climate, the falling costs of photovoltaic technology, and supportive policies such as tax incentives. Thailand's growth is hoped to lead to renewable energy cost reduction and increased investment for the ASEAN countries.

== Policy and goals ==
Oil, natural gas, and coal are still the main sources of energy in the country. Renewables accounted for one fifth (19.5%) of Thailands' energy generation in 2024, an increase of 186% since 2000. The government currently aims to increase that to 51% by 2037, a major revision from an initial target of 36%.

Thailand's increased gas consumption rates and dependence on gas imports over the past 50 years.

In 2015, Thailand's Integrated Energy Blueprint enacted the Alternative Energy Development Plan (AEDP) to increase energy produced by solar, wind, hydro, and bioenergy to 30 percent of the total energy by 2036. As part of the AEDP, Thailand joined the International Renewable Energy Agency (IRENA) in 2015. To improve the development of renewable energy sources, Thailand's Thirteenth National Economic and Social Development Plan is established to run during a five-year period from 2023 to 2027. Thailand pushes for reducing greenhouse gas emissions by increasing the usage of clean energy so as part of the plan the aim is to reduce 30% of greenhouse gas emissions by 2030. The main goal of the thirteenth plan is to drive economic growth and make Thailand a high-value economy.

The projected investment required for new renewable power between 2022 and 2037 is about 779 billion Thai Baht (around USD 22 billion).

== Biomass energy ==
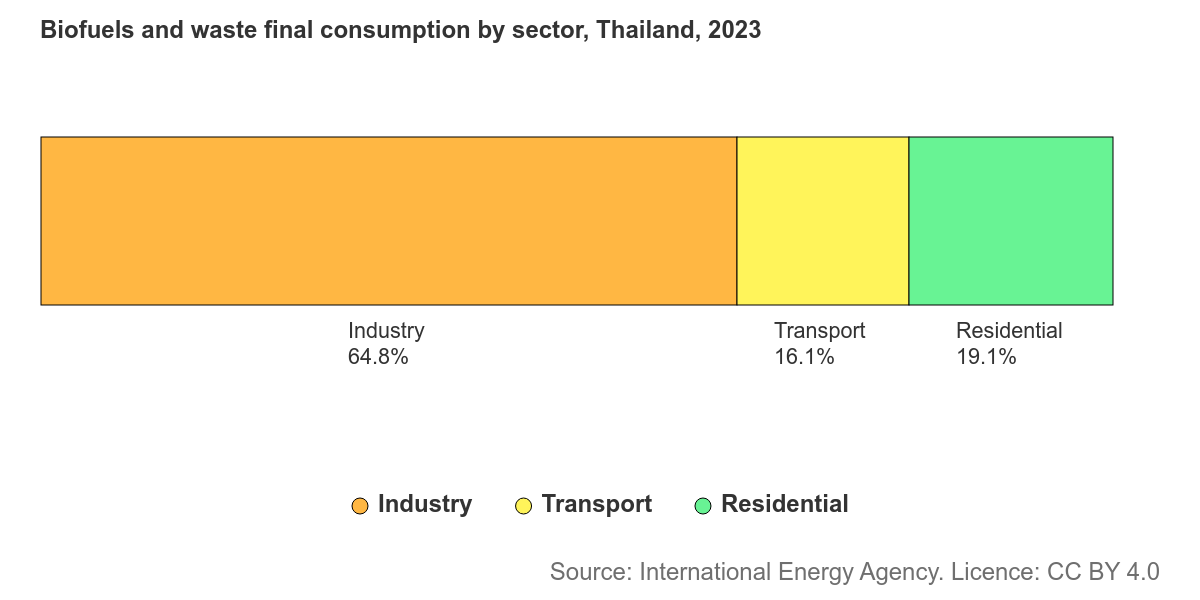
Biofuels and waste final consumption by sector, Thailand, 2023.

Of all renewable energy sources in Thailand, biomass energy produces up to 60.7% of the country's total electricity, 98% of its thermal energy, and nearly 100% of its transportation fuels. Due to its strong agricultural sector, Thailand's government promotes the domestic production of biomass energy. 80% of Thailand's biomass energy is derived from agricultural byproducts such as corn husks and byproducts from sugarcane crops.

Bioenergy capacity 2014–2023 (MW)
2014	2015	2016	2017	2018	2019	2020	2021	2022	2023
2,796	3,165	3,322	3,728	4,037	4,097	4,241	4,476	4,603	4,705

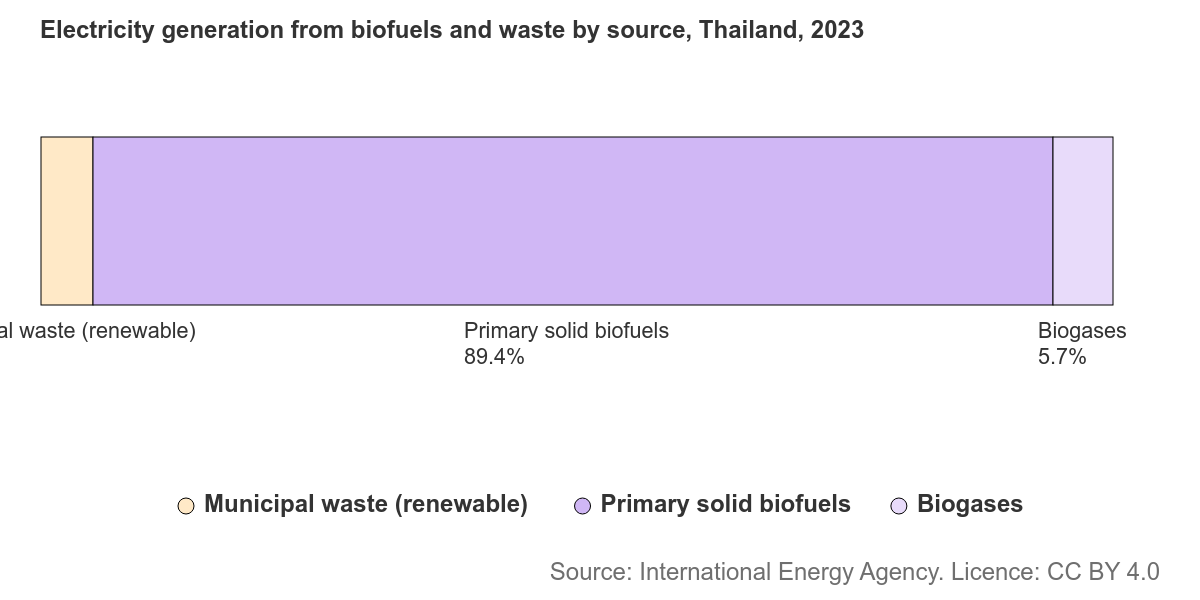
Electricity generation from biofuels and waste by source in 2023.

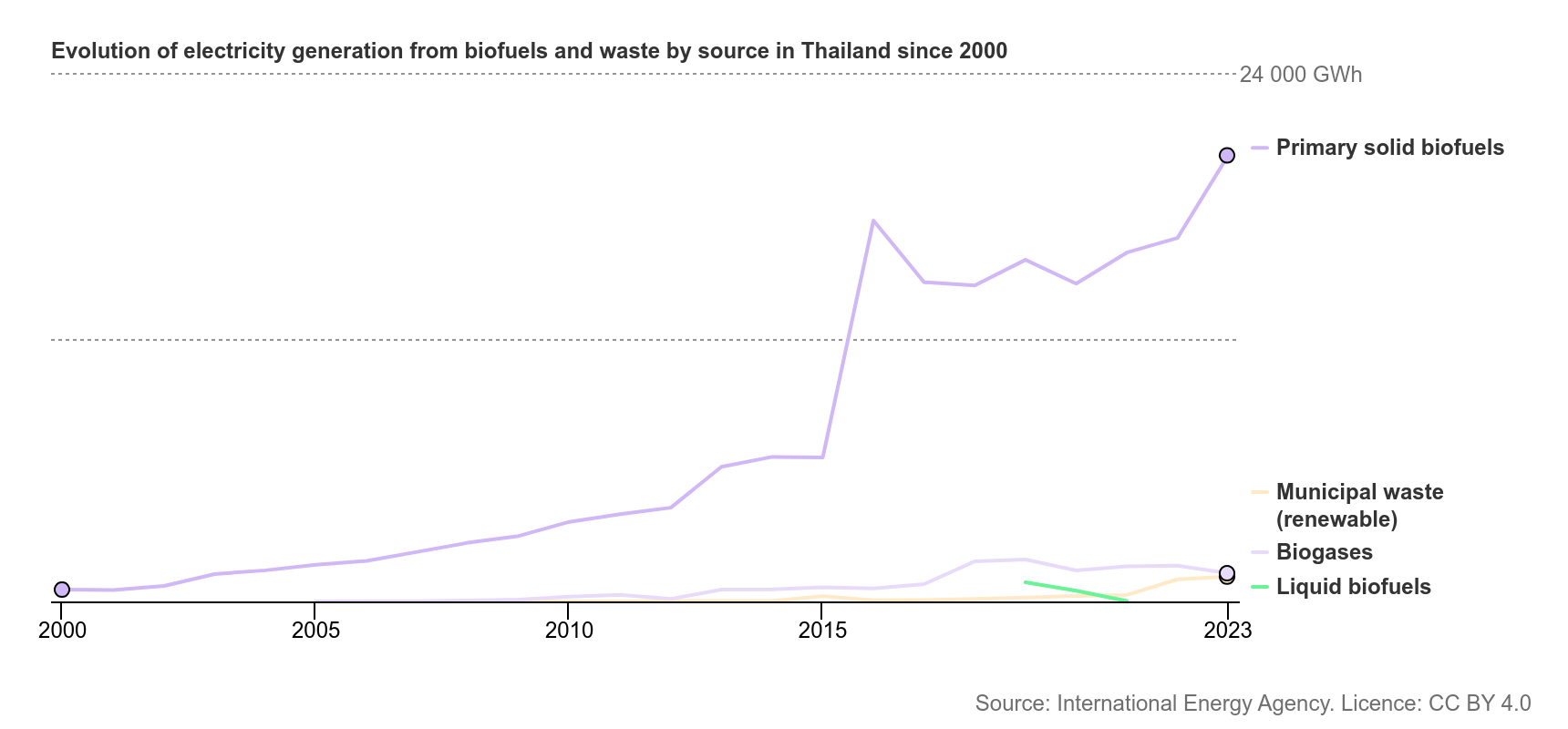
Evolution of electricity generation from biofuels and waste by source.

Policies and bans on certain fossil fuels have encouraged increased biofuel usage and production. Thailand's 2015 Alternative Energy Development Plan projected a 260% increase in biomass-generated electricity by 2036. The initiative also introduced the addition of ethanol in diesel fuels. The Eleventh National Economic and Social Development Plan was enacted in 2012 to influence the growth of biofuels from 2012 to 2016. Goals of this plan included sourcing biofuels, developing a zero-waste approach, refining existing technologies, and providing food and energy security.

== Solar energy ==
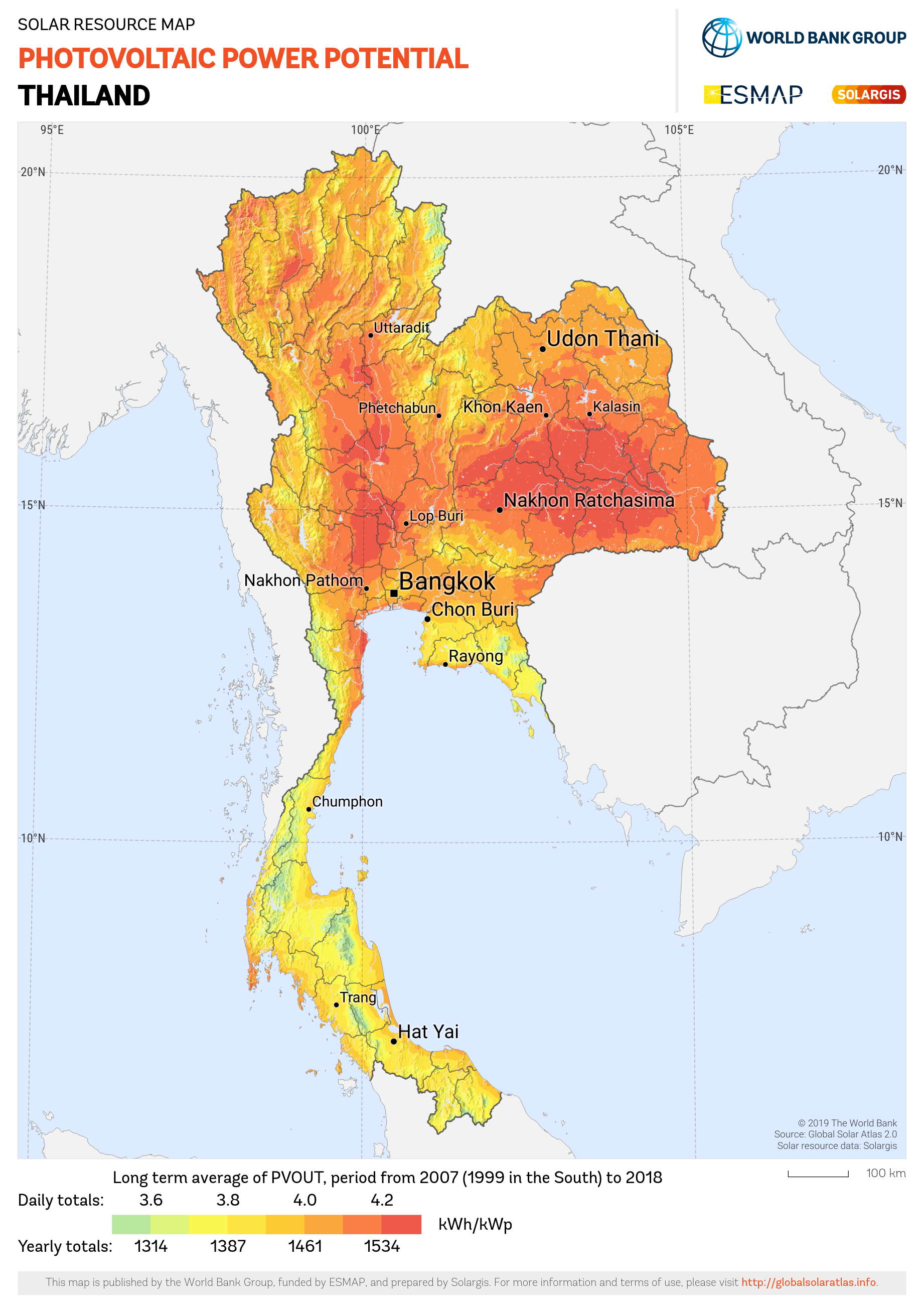
Map of Thailand's solar power potential.

Solar power makes up around 3% of Thailand's power generation. Thailand has access to year-round sun and estimated solar potential of approximately 300 GW. In 2022, the nation was utilising a little more than 1% of its total potential. Ember Energy estimated that increasing solar capacity by 89% and battery storage by 60% compared to Thailand's revised power development plan (RPDP) targets could save $1.8 billion in power generation costs by 2037.

Companies like the Solar Power Company Group (SPCG) and Natural Energy Development (NED) began their solar projects in 2010. NED started the project of building the Lopburi Solar Farm, the biggest solar plant funded by both local and financial institutions. By 2012, the farm became a 84 MW photovoltaic power station and by replacing fossil-fuels is set to prevent 1.3 million tonnes of greenhouse gas emission over 25 years. The SPCG also installed two solar farms by the end of 2014 which would help save 200,000 tonnes of CO_{2} per year.

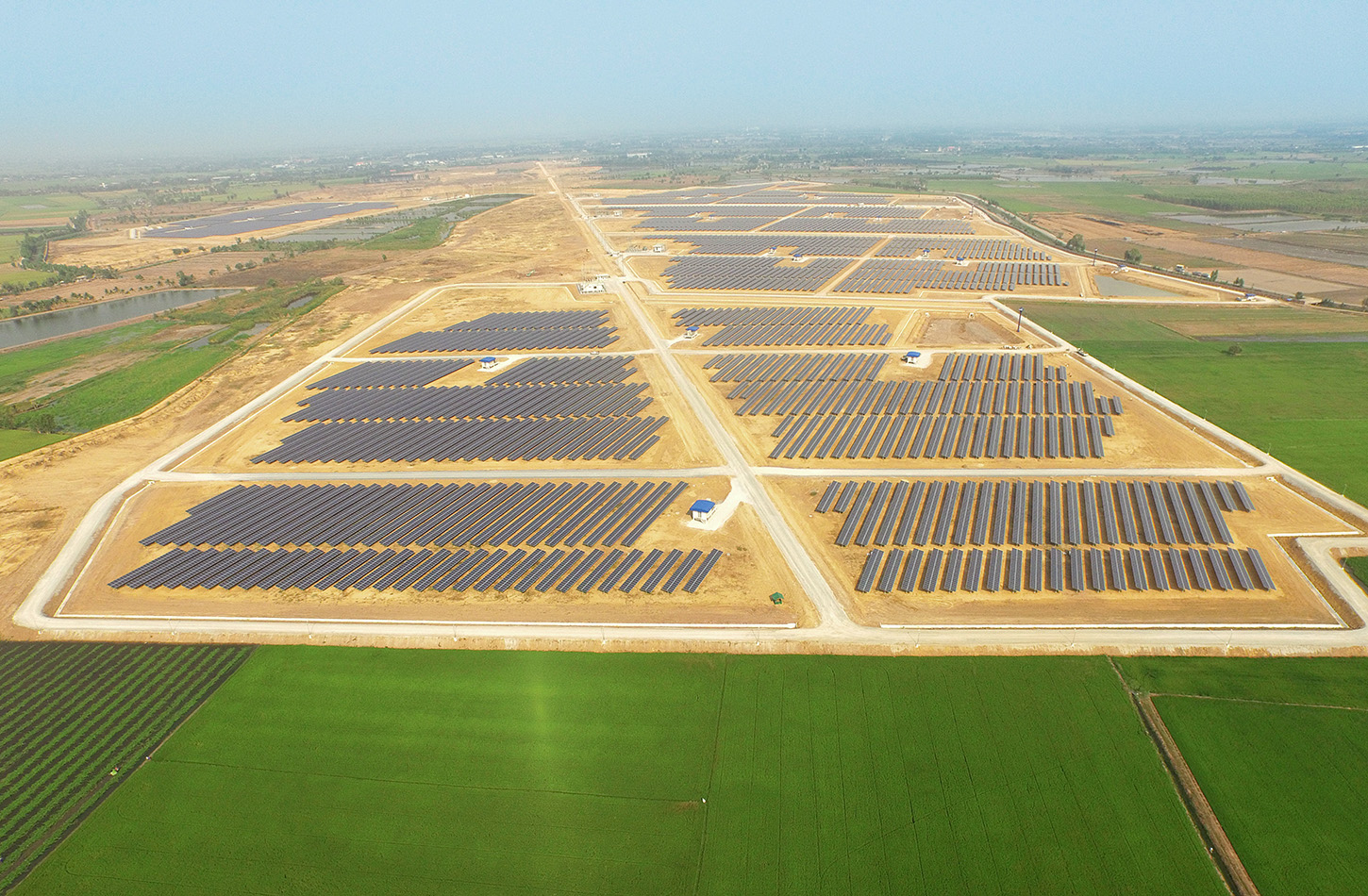
B.Grimm Yanhee Solar Power facility in Nakhon Pathom Province.

In March 2016, the Thai government gave approval for homes and commercial buildings to install solar panels. Each house will be permitted to generate 10 kW and each factory 40 kW. The private sector, despite Thailand's ample solar resources, previously had no right to install power-generation equipment. As of 2021, Thailand is considered as one of the most successful ASEAN countries in promoting and deploying solar energy.

Solar energy capacity 2014–2023 (MW)
2014	2015	2016	2017	2018	2019	2020	2021	2022	2023
1,304	1,425	2,451	2,702	2,967	2,988	2,984	3,065	3,185	3,186

Thailand is moving towards achieving its solar power installation target of 2030. By 2013, its solar capacity was ten times more than it was in 2011, and in 2014, the Renewable Energy Policy Network for the 21st Century Report noted that Thailand accounted for a dominant share of solar market growth in Southeast Asia. This growth is hoped to lead to reduced costs relating to renewable energy and increased investment.

The hydro-solar project by the EGAT started with the Sirindhorn Dam. The dam now has 144,000 solar panels installed and EGAT aims to produce 2,725 megawatts (30% of Thailand's power needs) of power from such floating solar farms by the year 2037.

== Hydroelectricity ==
Hydropower accounts for 3% of Thailand's power generation. Thailand currently has 26 hydroelectric dams in operation, generating around 3.7GW of energy. The largest of these dams is the Sirindhorn Dam located near the country's eastern border with Laos.

Hydropower capacity 2014–2023 (MW)
2014	2015	2016	2017	2018	2019	2020	2021	2022	2023
3,608	3,639	3,649	3,649	3,667	3,667	3,670	3,670	3,670	3,670

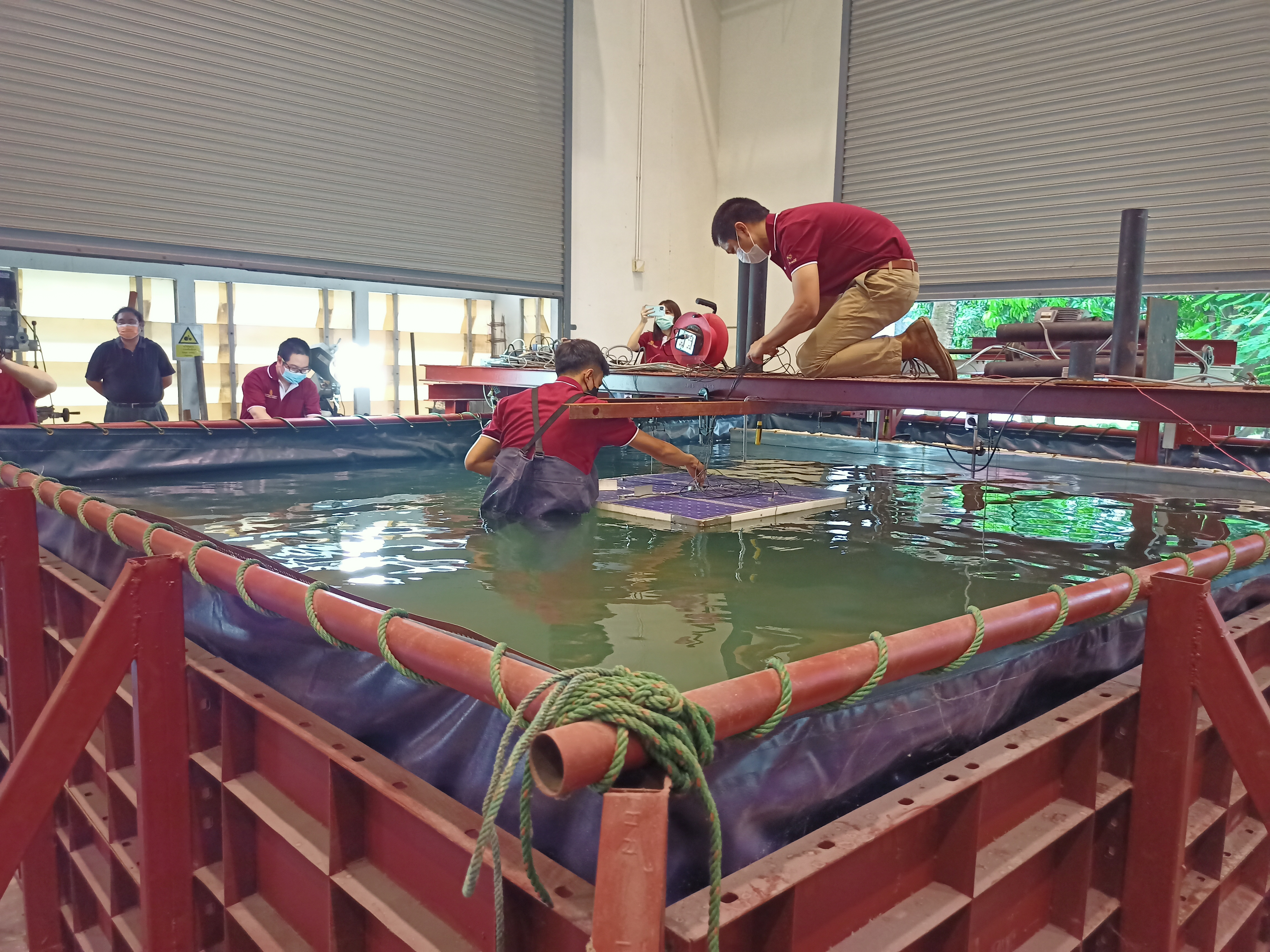
The first of the eight hydro-solar power plants being built.

In the future, the Electricity Generating Authority of Thailand (EGAT) plans to build eight hybrid hydro-solar farms and will generate up to 1 GW of electricity. These hybrid hydro-solar power plants operate by placing solar panels on top of the existing water reservoir created by the dam. The first of these hybrid hydro-solar dams became operational in 2021 at Sirindhorn Dam with an operational capacity of 45MW.

In 2022, EGAT reached an agreement with Andritz, an Austrian services and technology company, to expand Thailand's hydropower industry with new plants and digitalize the current facilities. Thailand currently has a plan to increase the country's total installed energy capacity by about 40% by 2037, largely through renewable energy sources like hydropower.

== Wind energy ==
Wind power generates 2% of Thailand's energy and accounts for 3% of installed capacity. Since 2017, Thailand has had an exponential growth of 70% yearly in wind power installation. Huay Bong 2 and Huay Bong 3 are the top two 103.5 MW wind power projects that started operating in 2013 and 2012. These wind farms were built by the companies Aeolus Power, Chubu Electric Power Korat, KR 2 and RATCH Group in Nakhon Ratchasima, Thailand.

Wind energy capacity 2014–2023 (MW)
2014	2015	2016	2017	2018	2019	2020	2021	2022	2023
225	234	507	628	1,103	1,507	1,507	1 545	1,545	1 545

During the first Thailand Wind Energy Roundtable in 2019, the Thailand Wind Energy Association, Global Wind Energy Council, and United States Agency for International Development created a plan for Thailand to increase its wind power capacity. In 2019, Thailand had 1.5 GW of wind power and that brought in $3 billion in investment for wind energy. The new plans included increasing their wind power by at least 7 GW by 2037 which would double the investment and create more jobs in Thailand.

== See also ==
- Energy in Thailand
- Renewable energy by country
