= Mae Ngat Somboon Chon Dam =

Dam in Mae Taeng, Chiang Mai, Thailand

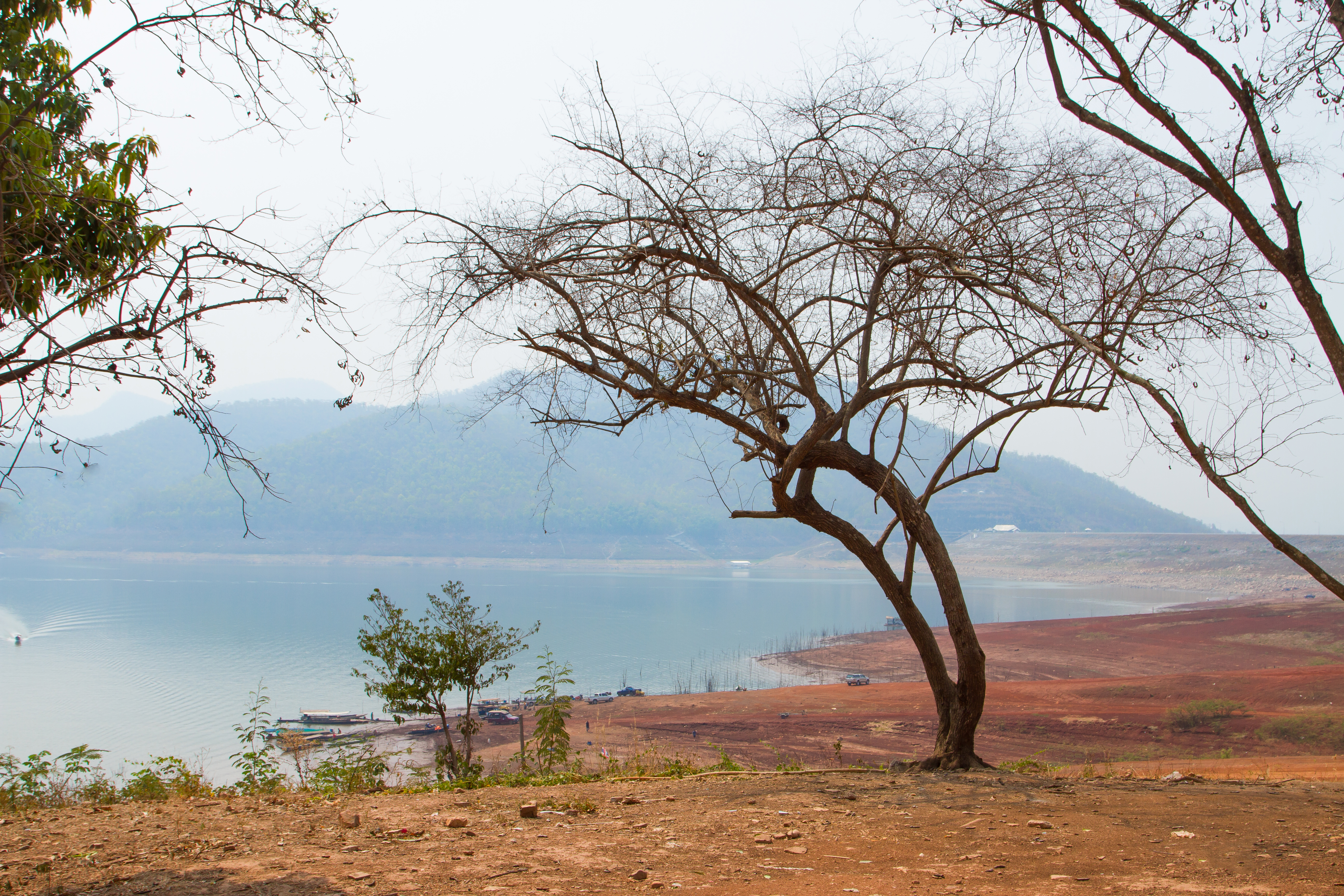

- Dam location in Thailand
- Country: Thailand
- Location: Mae Taeng, Chiang Mai
- Coordinates: 19°9′41″N 99°2′24″E
- Purpose: Multi-purpose
- Status: Operational
- Opening date: 22 February 1986
- Owner: Electricity Generating Authority of Thailand

Dam and spillways
- Type of dam: Earth fill dam
- Impounds: Mae Ngat River
- Height (foundation): 59 m (194 ft)
- Length: 1,950 m (6,400 ft)

Reservoir
- Creates: Mae Ngat Somboon Chon Reservoir
- Total capacity: 265,000,000 m^{3} (9.4×10^{9} ft^{3})
- Catchment area: 1,281 km^{2} (495 sq mi)
- Surface area: 16 km^{2} (6.2 sq mi)

Power Station
- Operator: Electricity Generating Authority of Thailand
- Commission date: 1985
- Turbines: 2 x 4.5 MW
- Installed capacity: 9 MW
- Annual generation: 29 GWh
- Website; Mae Ngat Somboon Chon Dam at EGAT

The Mae Ngat Somboon Chon Dam (Thai: เขื่อนแม่งัดสมบูรณ์ชล, RTGS: Khuean Mae Ngat Sombun Chon, pronounced [kʰɯ̀a̯n mɛ̂ː ŋát sǒm.būːn t͡ɕʰōn]) is a multi-purpose hydroelectric dam in the Mae Taeng District of Chiang Mai Province, Thailand. It impounds the Mae Ngat River, a tributary of the Ping River. The dam is located at the western side of Si Lanna National Park.

== Description ==
Mae Ngat Somboon Chon Dam is an earth fill dam. It is 1,950 m (6,400 ft) long and 59 m (194 ft) high. Its reservoir has a maximum storage capacity of 265,000,000 m^{3} (9.4×10^{9} ft^{3}) with a catchment area of 1,281 km^{2} (495 mi^{2}).

== Power plant ==
The dam's power plant has two hydroelectric generating units, each with an installed capacity of 4.5 MW. They became operational in 1985.
