= Lopburi Solar Farm =

Photovoltaic power station in Thailand

- Country: Thailand
- Coordinates: 15°03′06″N 100°53′32″E
- Status: Operational
- Construction began: July 2010
- Commission date: 23 Dec 2011
- Construction cost: US$70 million
- Owner: Natural Energy Development Co. Ltd. (NED)

Solar farm
- Type: Flat-panel PV

Power generation
- Units operational: 640,000
- Nameplate capacity: 84 MW
- Capacity factor: 16.45%
- Annual net output: 105.512 GWh

External links
- Website: www.ned.co.th

The Lopburi Solar Farm is a 55-megawatt (MW) photovoltaic power station in Lopburi Province, Thailand. The plant was constructed over a period of 18 months beginning in 2010 with a loan of US$70 million (two billion baht) from the Asian Development Bank, and was expected to generate 105 GWh/year. An additional 11 MW were added to the initial capacity of 73.16 MW in May 2013. Thailand used 145,300.19 GWh in 2009. The original cost estimate was US$271 million.

A 2014 review of the activity reported that the project had concluded two years of successful activity. The review classified the project as "highly successful".

== See also ==
- List of photovoltaic power stations
- Photovoltaic power stations
- Solar power in Thailand
