= Nam Pung Dam =

Dam in Phu Phan, Sakon Nakhon, Thailand

- Interactive map of Nam Pung Dam
- Country: Thailand
- Location: Phu Phan District, Sakon Nakhon
- Coordinates: 16.975217°N 103.974195°E
- Opening date: 1965
- Owner: Electricity Generating Authority of Thailand

Dam and spillways
- Type of dam: Earth core rockfill dam
- Impounds: Phung River
- Height: 40 m (130 ft)
- Length: 1,720 m (5,640 ft)

Reservoir
- Creates: Nam Pung Dam Reservoir
- Catchment area: 21 km^{2} (8.1 mi^{2})

Power Station
- Operator: Electricity Generating Authority of Thailand
- Installed capacity: 6.3 MW
- Annual generation: 15 GWh

The Nam Pung Dam (Thai: เขื่อนน้ำพุง, RTGS: Khuean Nam Phung, pronounced [kʰɯ̀a̯n náːm pʰūŋ]) is a hydroelectric dam on the Phung River in the Phu Phan District of Sakon Nakhon Province, Thailand.
