= Huai Kum Dam =

Dam in Kaset Sombun, Chaiyaphum, Thailand

- Interactive map of Huai Kum Dam
- Official name: Huai Kum Dam
- Country: Thailand
- Location: Kaset Sombun, Chaiyaphum
- Coordinates: 16.410198°N 101.793102°E
- Opening date: 1980
- Owner: Electricity Generating Authority of Thailand

Dam and spillways
- Type of dam: Rockfill
- Impounds: Nam Phrom River
- Height: 35.5 m (116 ft)
- Length: 282 m (925 ft)

Reservoir
- Creates: Huai Kum Dam Reservoir

Power Station
- Operator: Electricity Generating Authority of Thailand
- Installed capacity: 1.2 MW
- Annual generation: 2 GWh

Huai Kum Dam (Thai: เขื่อนห้วยกุ่ม, romanized: Khuean Huai Kum, pronounced [kʰɯ̀an hûaj kùm]; Northeastern Thai: เขื่อนห้วยกุ่ม, pronounced [kʰɯ̄an hùaj kúm]), is on the Nam Phrom River in Nong Phon Ngam Subdistrict, Kaset Sombun District, Chaiyaphum Province, Thailand. It consists of a rockfill dam with clay core (35.5 metres high and 282 metres long) and a 1.2 MW semi-underground powerhouse which rises four metres high from the ground and 11 metres beneath the surface. The dam forms a reservoir with a storage capacity of 22 million cubic metres to supply water for the downstream irrigation areas of Chulabhorn Dam in Chaiyaphum Province whereas the power plant provides two million kWh of electric energy per year. The king and the queen accompanied by Princess Maha Chakri Sirindhorn and Princess Chulabhorn presided over the inauguration ceremony on 19 December 1980.
