= Tha Thung Na Dam =

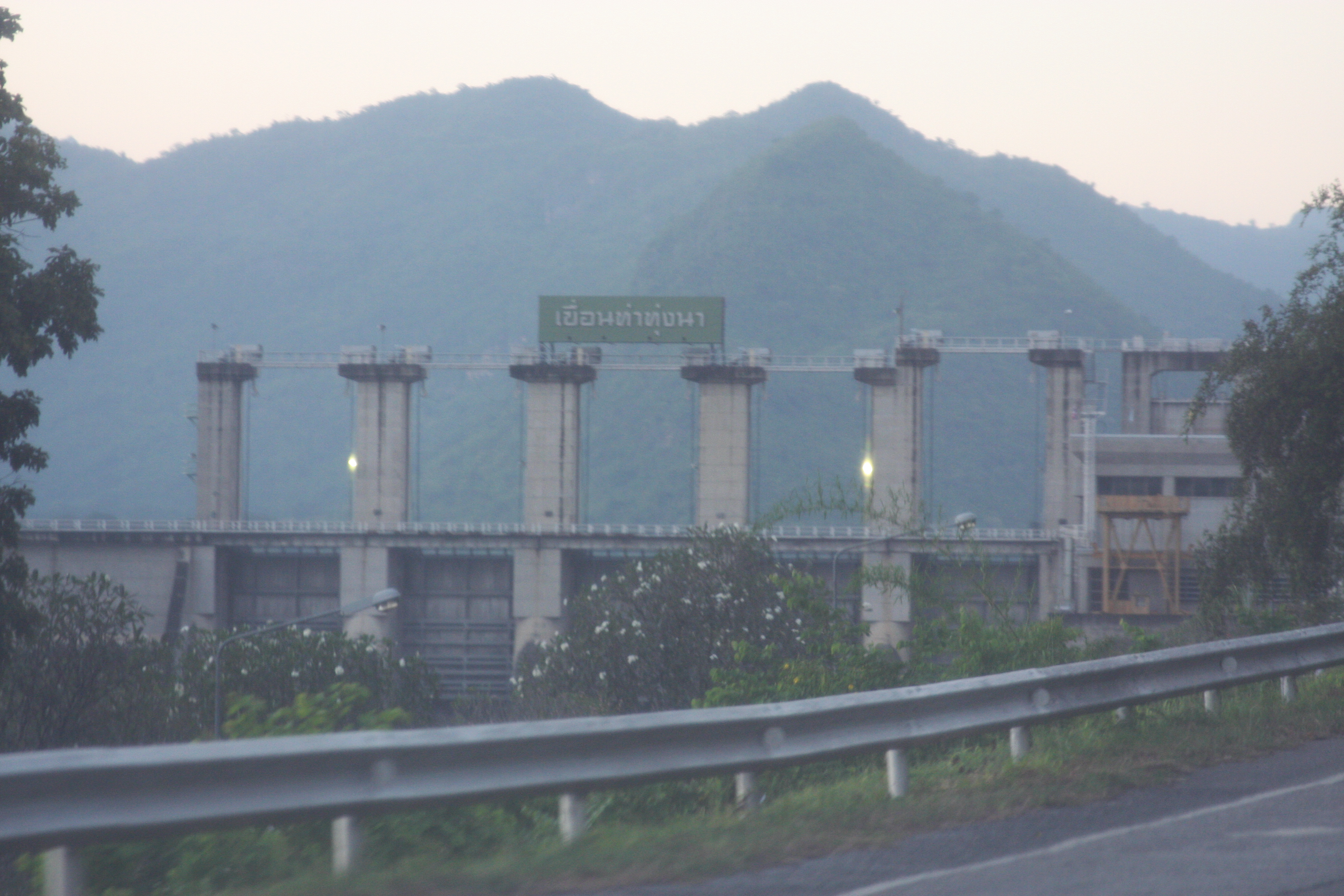

- Dam location in Thailand
- Country: Thailand
- Location: Mueang Kanchanaburi, Kanchanaburi
- Coordinates: 14°14′1″N 99°14′9″E
- Purpose: Multi-purpose
- Status: Operational
- Opening date: 1981
- Owner: Electricity Generating Authority of Thailand

Dam and spillways
- Type of dam: Gravity dam
- Impounds: Khwae Yai River
- Height (foundation): 30 m (98 ft)
- Length: 840 m (2,760 ft)
- Width (crest): 8 m (26 ft)

Reservoir
- Creates: Tha Thung Na Reservoir
- Total capacity: 54,800,000 m^{3} (1.94×10^{9} ft^{3})
- Normal elevation: 59.7 m (196 ft) (MSL)

Power Station
- Operator: Electricity Generating Authority of Thailand
- Commission date: February 1982
- Turbines: 2 x 19 MW
- Installed capacity: 38 MW
- Website; Tha Thung Na Dam at EGAT

The Tha Thung Na Dam (Thai: เขื่อนท่าทุ่งนา, RTGS: Khuean Tha Thung Na Dam, pronounced [kʰɯ̀a̯n tʰâː tʰûŋ nāː]) is a multi-purpose hydroelectric dam in the Mueang Kanchanaburi District of Kanchanaburi Province, Thailand. It impounds the Khwae Yai River. The dam is located at the southeastern corner of Erawan National Park.

== Description ==
Tha Thung Na Dam is a rock fill and concrete gravity dam. It is 840 m (2,760 ft) long and 30 m (98 ft) high. Its reservoir has a maximum storage capacity of 54,800,000 m^{3} (1.94×10^{9} ft^{3}).

== Power plant ==
The dam's power plant has two hydroelectric generating units, each with an installed capacity of 19 MW. The first unit was commissioned in December 1981 and the second unit in February 1982.
