= Energy in Thailand =

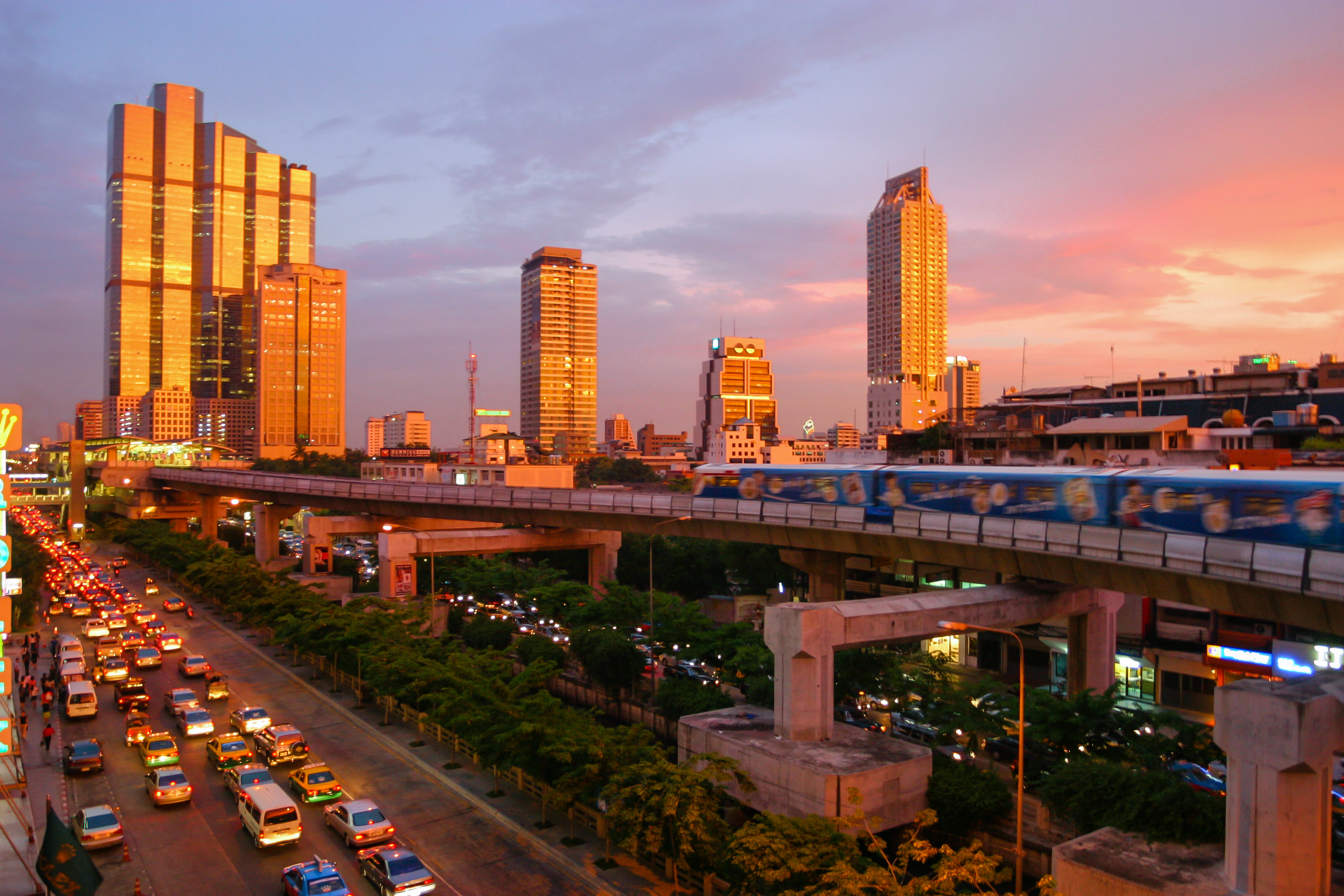
Growing cities like Bangkok are experiencing increased energy consumption.

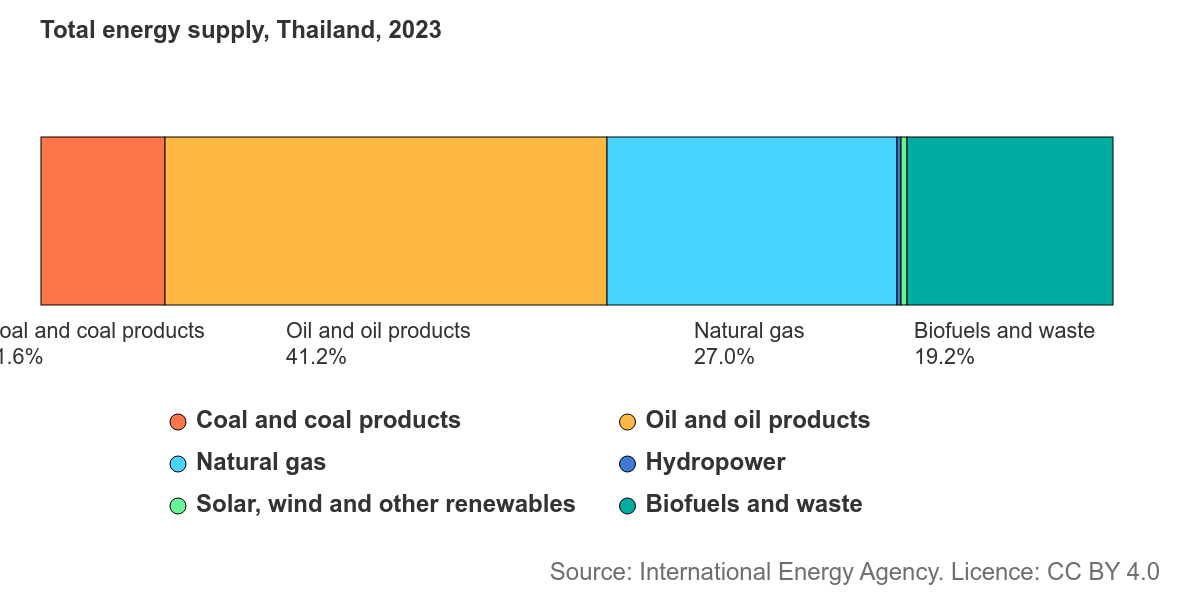
Total energy supply in Thailand, 2023.

Energy in Thailand refers to the production, storage, import and export, and use of energy in the Southeast Asian nation of Thailand. Thailand has relatively limited domestic fossil fuel resources and relies heavily on imported fuels, particularly crude oil and liquefied natural gas. Domestic energy production includes natural gas from the Gulf of Thailand, lignite coal, and a large biomass sector linked to the agricultural economy.

Thailand's electricity system is dominated by fossil fuels, particularly natural gas which accounts for the highest total power generation capacity. Coal and lignite provide a smaller share, while renewable energy sources such as biomass, solar, wind, and hydropower are expanding gradually but still represent a minority share of the national energy mix. Biomass is the largest renewable electricity source. Solar will likely play a central role in Thailand's energy transition. Thailand also imports electricity from neighbouring countries, particularly hydropower from Laos.

Energy demand and consumption have grown steadily rapidly since the late twentieth century due to industrialisation and economic development. The transport sector is the largest consumer of petroleum products, while industry accounts for a significant share of electricity use.

Thailand has achieved near-universal electrification and relatively high per-capita electricity consumption compared with many Southeast Asian countries. However, the energy system remains dependent on fossil fuels, particularly imported liquified natural gas, which could present a risk to Thailand's energy security.

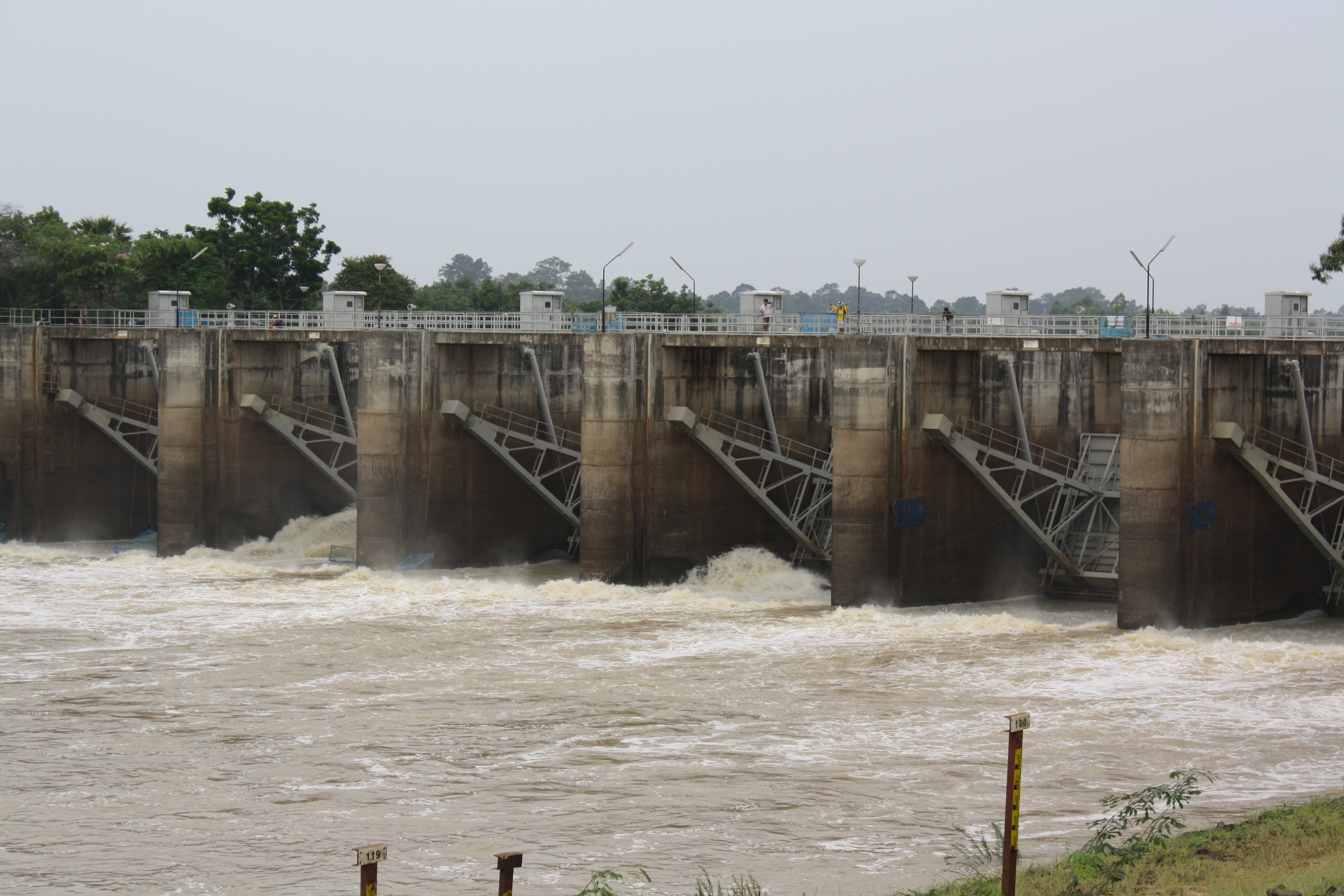
Rasi Salai Dam

Thai energy policy emphasises the diversification of fuel sources and increased renewable energy deployment, aiming for 51% renewables share by 2037. The government has introduced long-term planning frameworks such as the Power Development Plan and the Alternative Energy Development Plan to guide energy infrastructure investment and expand renewable energy capacity. Despite growing renewable targets, energy and policy analysts note that continued reliance on natural gas and projected electricity demand growth could slow the pace of energy transition.

== Non-renewables ==
=== Oil ===
Offshore production wasn't enough to bring the country close to self-reliance.

Oil and oil products make up 41% of Thailand's total energy supply. The transport sector consumes almost 48% of oil products.

Thailand first began producing oil in 1981, when it started producing 2,000 barrels (84,000 US gallons) per day. By 2013, daily production had increased to 459,000 barrels. Crude oil sources are located in the north and central region, as well as coastal areas of Thailand. As of March 2024, Thailand has 34 active petroleum projects in 47 oil fields in the Gulf of Thailand.

Three quarters (79.5%) of total crude oil supply is imported into Thailand. Proved oil reserves are estimated at 0.3 thousand million barrels, giving it a reserves-to-production ratio (R/P) of 1.8. meaning that its oil is virtually exhausted. Indications are that Thai oil peaked in 2016 at 486,000 barrels per day and has slowly declined since then.

=== Gas ===
Much of the country's gas is imported.

Natural gas makes up 27% of Thailand's total energy supply and fuels approximately 64% of Thailand's electrical power generation. Natural gas makes up 32% of Thailand's domestic energy production. Natural gas domestic production in Thailand peaked in 2013. A 2026 analysis of the gas infrastructure in Thailand highlighted how it was overbuilt and underutilized, costing the government significant amounts of money and new gas infrastructure requiring doubling of imports.

Thailand's proved natural gas reserves amount to 0.2 trillion m^{3}. Its production in 2018 was 37.7 billion m^{3} (32.4 Mtoe) giving it an R/P ratio of only five years. It consumed 49.9 billion m^{3}, making up the shortfall with 6.2 billion m^{3} in liquid natural gas (LNG) imports and 7.8 billion m^{3} via pipeline from Myanmar. The Erawan gas field in the Gulf of Thailand supplies about 20% of Thailand's gas production. The field is estimated to have a capacity of 885 million cubic feet (c. 25 million m^{3}) per day.

=== Coal ===
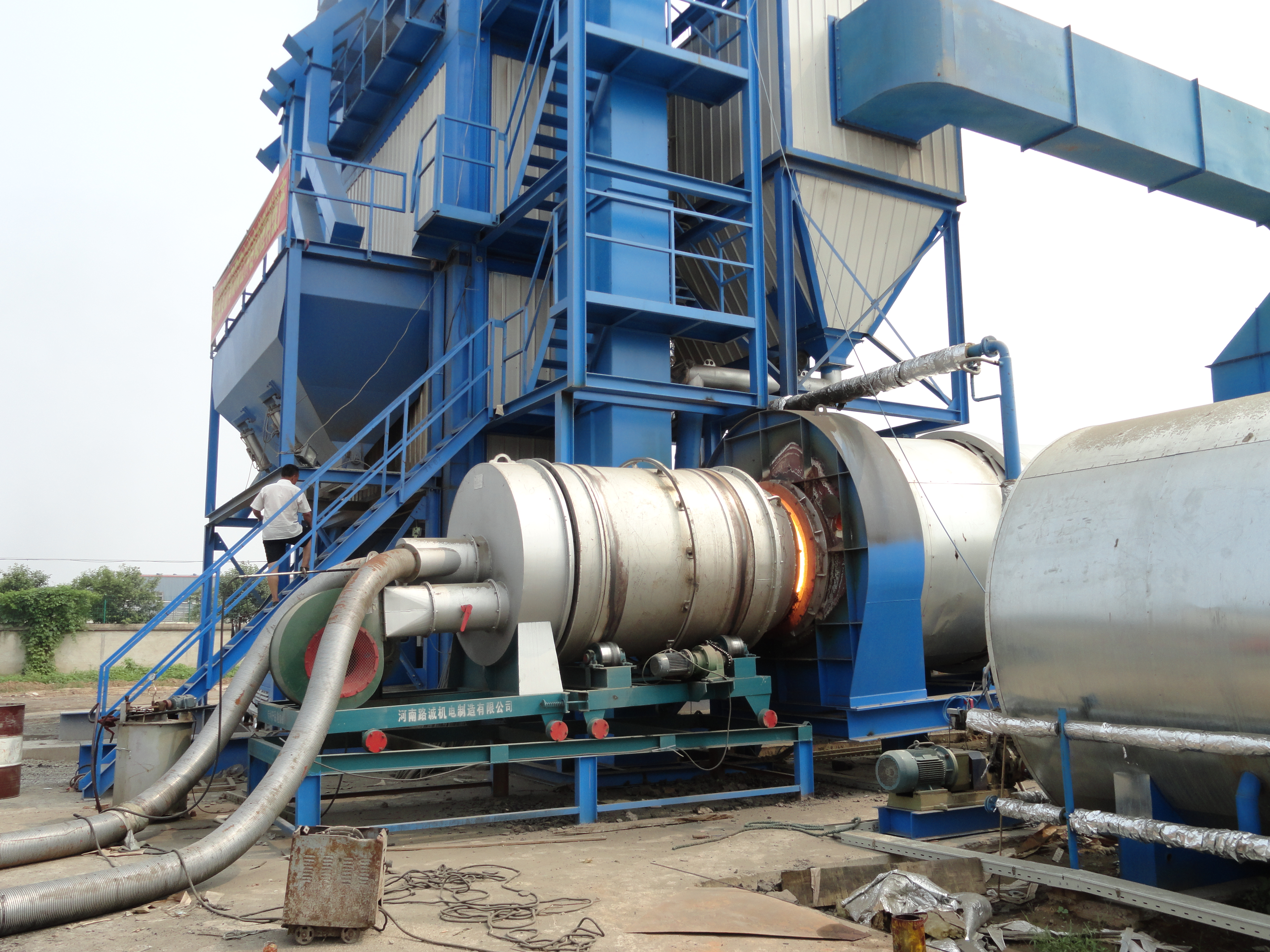
Coal burner in Thailand

Coal and coal products make up 11.6% of Thailand's total energy supply. All of Thailand's total coal production is in the form of lignite. Coal imports have increased by 365% since 2000. In 2019 Thailand's reserves-to-production ratio was 72 (years).

=== Nuclear ===
Thailand has no nuclear power plants. Earlier plans to produce five gigawatts of electricity by 2025 using nuclear technology were scaled back to 2 GW in the aftermath of the Fukushima disaster.

As memories of Fukushima recede, interest in nuclear power has revived. Seven ASEAN nations, including Thailand, have signed cooperation agreements with Rosatom, Russia's state nuclear energy agency. EGAT is working with China, Japan, and South Korea on nuclear power generation technology and has sent 100 specialists to train for nuclear power plant projects. EGAT plans for up to five percent of the country's power generation to be generated from nuclear by 2036.

== Renewables ==
Renewable energy in Thailand is a developing sector that addresses the country's present high rate of carbon emissions and energy security risks. Thailand still relies heavily on fossil fuels, with renewables accounting for one fifth of the country's energy generation in 2024. The major source of renewable energy in Thailand is biomass (95%), with hydro, solar, and wind power making up small additional contributions.

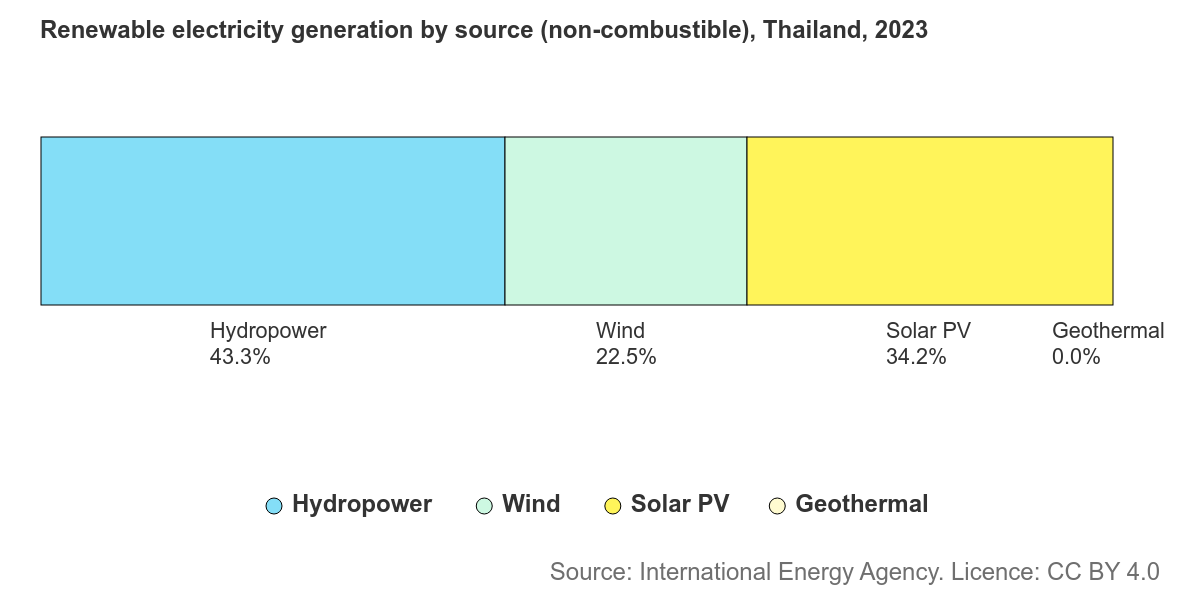
Thailand's renewable electricity generation by source (non-combustible) in 2023.

Policies such as the Thirteenth National Economic and Social Development Plan (2023-2027) and the Alternative Energy Development Plan (2018-2037), set future goals for increasing the capacity of renewable energy and reduce the reliance of nonrenewable energy. The government aims to increase the use of renewables to 51% of energy generation by 2037, which could save over $9 billion every year. The Thai government also wants all new cars sold to be electric by the year 2035.

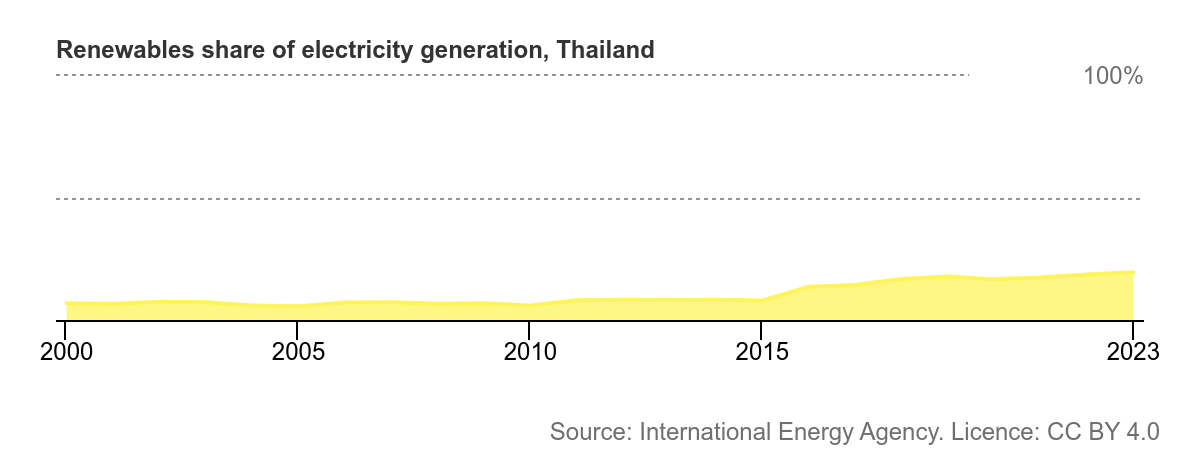
Share of Thai electricity generation from renewables since 2000.

Total energy generating capacity for renewables has doubled since 2012, a trend that should continue with policy support. Solar power will likely play a central role in Thailand's energy transition due to the country's tropical climate, the falling costs of photovoltaic technology, and supportive policies such as tax incentives. Thailand's growth is hoped to lead to renewable energy cost reduction and increased investment for the ASEAN countries.

Total renewable energy capacity 2014–2023 (MW)
2014	2015	2016	2017	2018	2019	2020	2021	2022	2023
7,373	7,902	9,369	10,147	11,215	11,700	11,843	12,197	12,444	12,547

=== Biomass ===
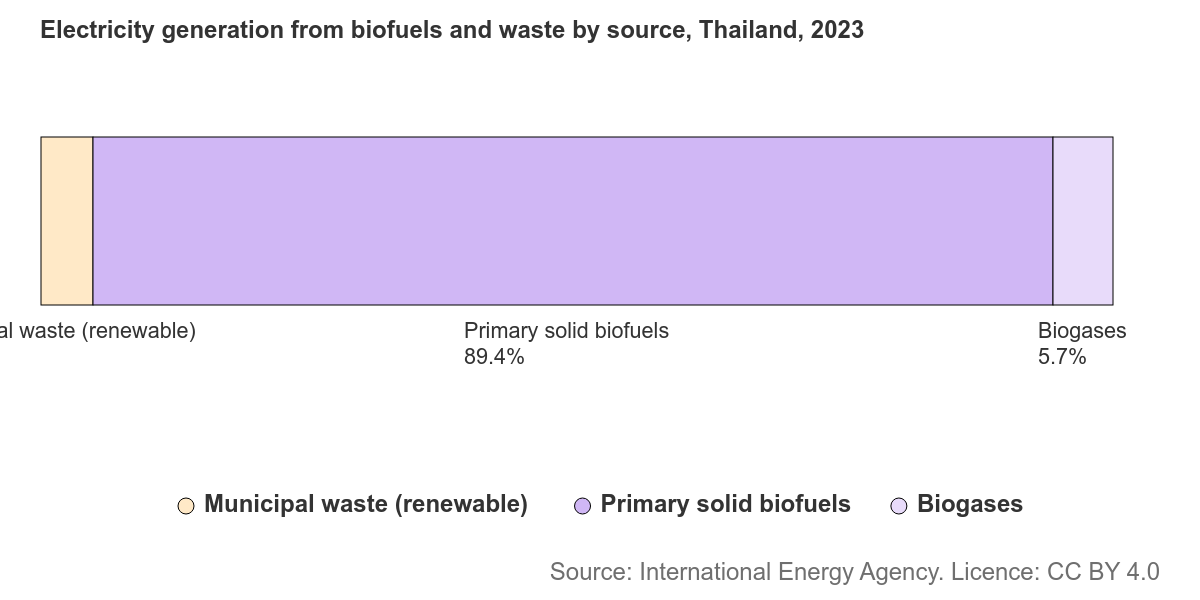
Electricity generation from biofuels and waste by source, Thailand, 2023.

Bioenergy is the most used renewable source in Thailand, producing up to 60.7% of the country's renewable electricity, 98% of its renewable thermal energy, and nearly 100% of its renewable transportation fuels. Due to its strong agricultural sector, Thailand's government promotes the domestic production of energy from biomass . 80% of Thailand's biomass energy is derived from agricultural byproducts such as corn husks and byproducts from sugarcane crops.

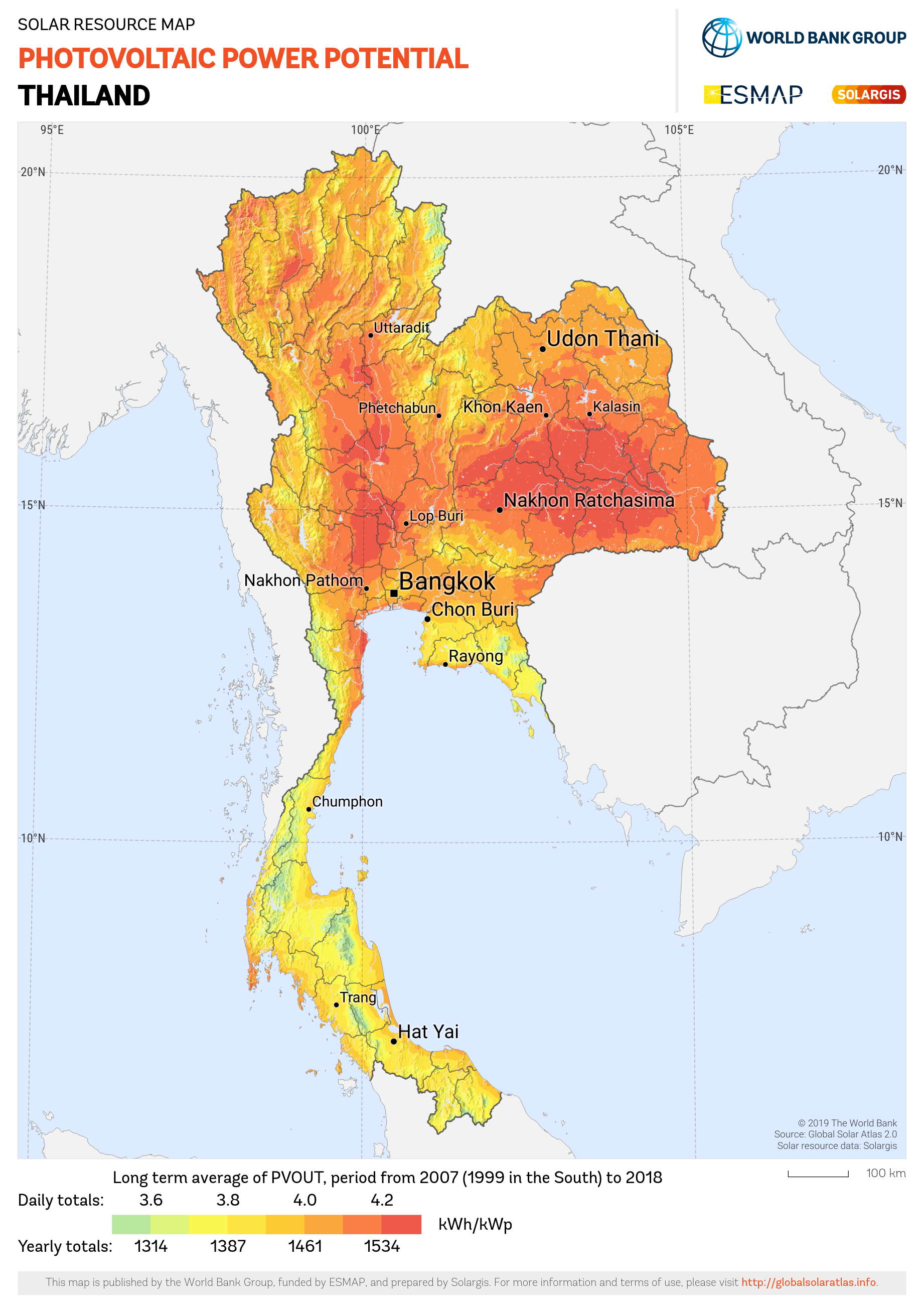
Map of Thailand's photovalic potential.

=== Solar power ===
Solar power makes up around 3% of Thailand's power generation. Thailand has access to year-round sun and estimated solar potential of approximately 300 GW. In 2022, the nation was utilising a little more than 1% of its total potential. Ember energy analysts estimated that increasing solar capacity by 89% and battery storage by 60% compared to Thailand's revised power development plan (RPDP) targets could save $1.8 billion in power generation costs by 2037.

=== Hydropower ===
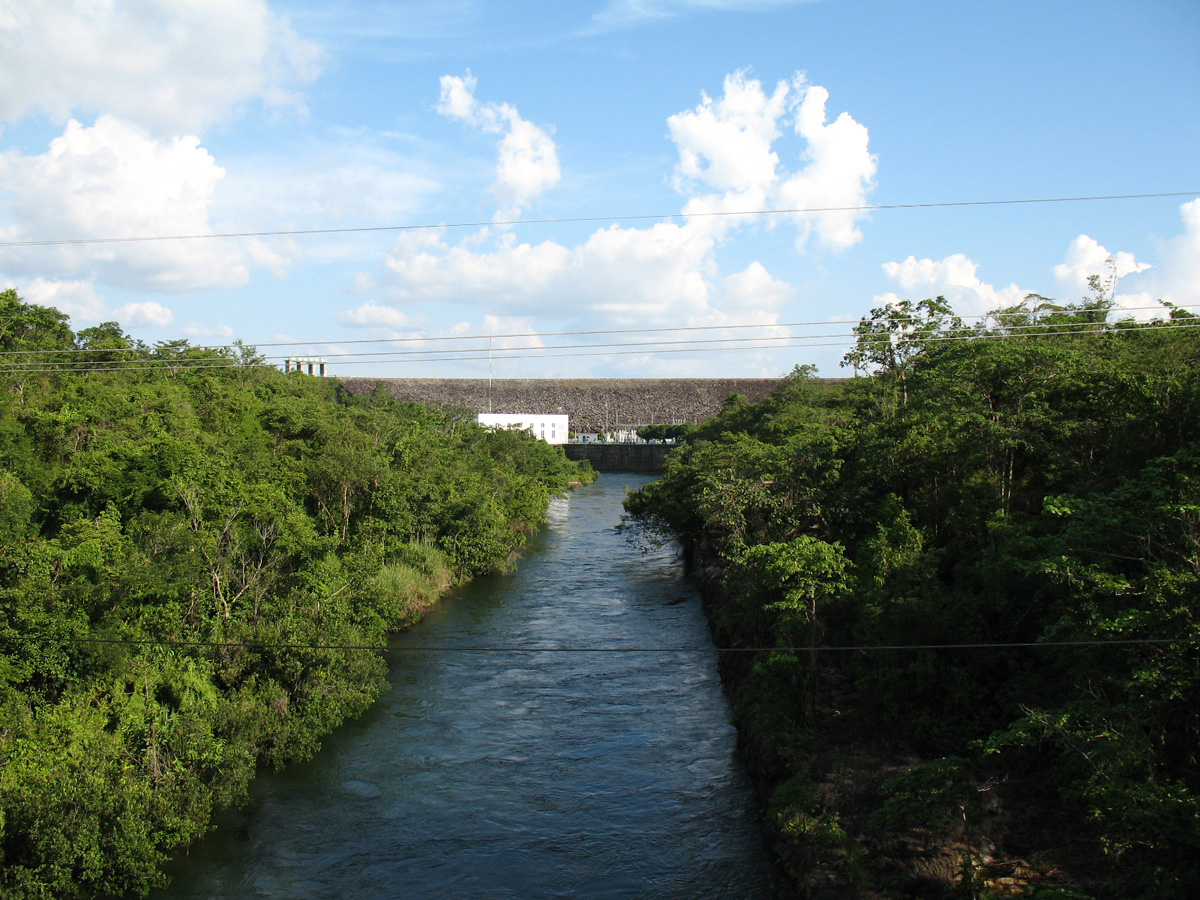
The Sirindhorn Dam, Thailand's largest hydroelectric facility.

Hydropower accounts for 3% of Thailand's power generation. Thailand currently has 26 hydroelectric dams in operation, generating around 3.7GW of energy. The largest of these dams is the Sirindhorn Dam located near the country's eastern border with Laos.

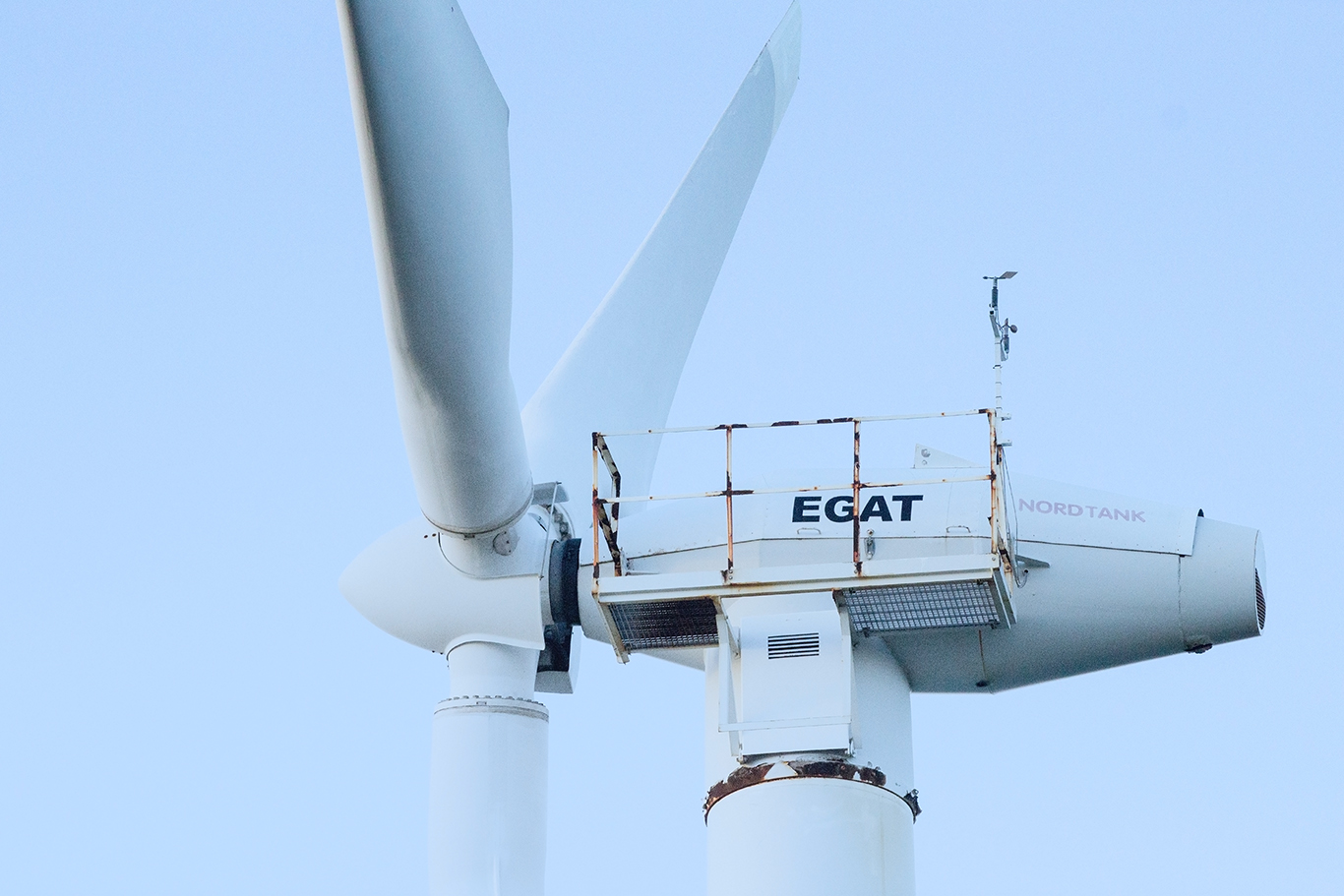
EGAT wind turbine in Phuket.

=== Wind power ===
Wind power generates 2% of Thailand's energy and accounts for 3% of installed capacity. Since 2017, Thailand has had an exponential growth of 70% yearly in wind power installation.

== Carbon emissions ==
In 2023 Thailand emitted 244.291 MtCO2 from fuel combustion, equivalent to 0.7% of total global emissions from combustable fuels. This represents a 59% increase for Thailand from 2000 to 2023. The largest emissions sources were oil (45%) and natural gas (31%).

Carbon dioxide emissions from energy, 2011–2021 (MtCO_{2})
2011	2012	2013	2014	2015	2016	2017	2018	2019	2020	2021
249.3	266.7	265.8	273.7	281.1	286.8	287.5	293.2	288.4	270.0	269.4

Thailand has set ambitious targets to reach net-zero emissions by 2065 and a 30% reduction in greenhouse gas emissions by 2030. The Thai government has begun to implement a carbon pricing mechanism, encompassing carbon taxes and Emission Trading Schemes (ETS), as a pivotal element of its climate policy. These efforts are complemented by a phased withdrawal of fossil fuel subsidies and the introduction of supportive policies aimed at reducing the nation's carbon footprint. A 2023 World Bank report underscored the dual benefits of such policies, not only in mitigating climate change but also in reducing the financial and health impacts of air pollution, as evidenced by the substantial costs associated with PM2.5 exposure in Thailand. The report concluded that while the initial steps towards carbon pricing are critical, they would need to be significantly bolstered after 2030, alongside the adoption of additional measures such as the expansion of electric vehicle infrastructure and renewable energy skills development, to achieve the deep emission cuts required for Thailand to meet its climate objectives.

== Electricity ==
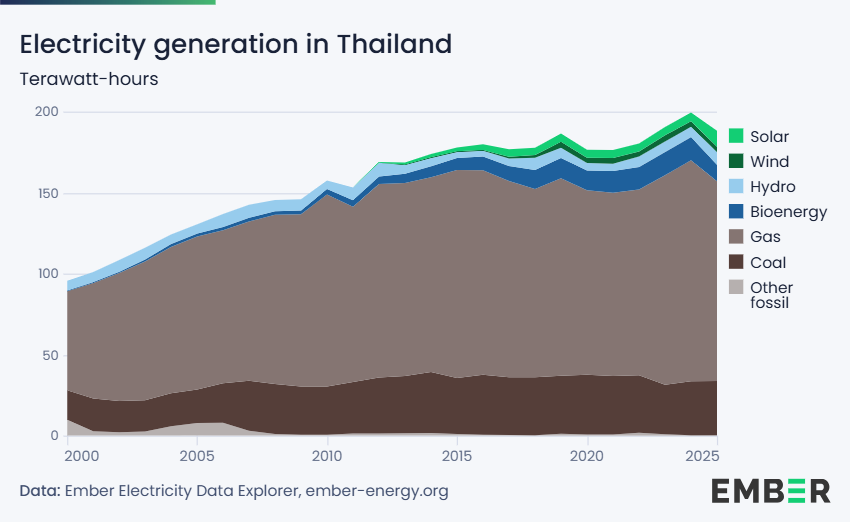
Electricity generation in Thailand in terawatt-hours

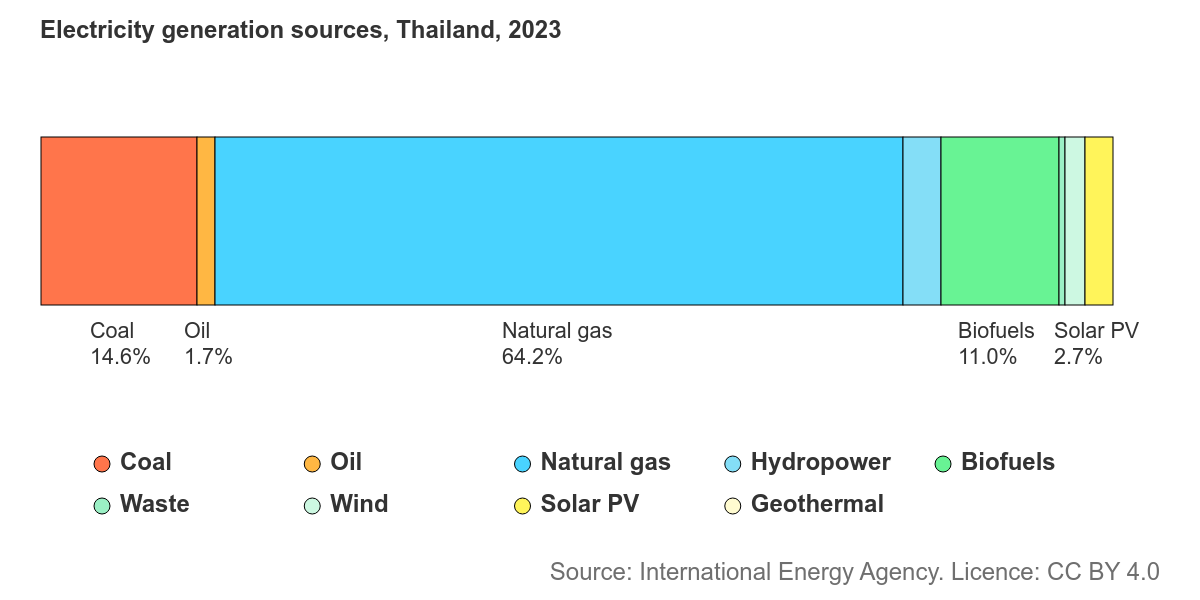
Thailand's Electricity generation sources in 2023.

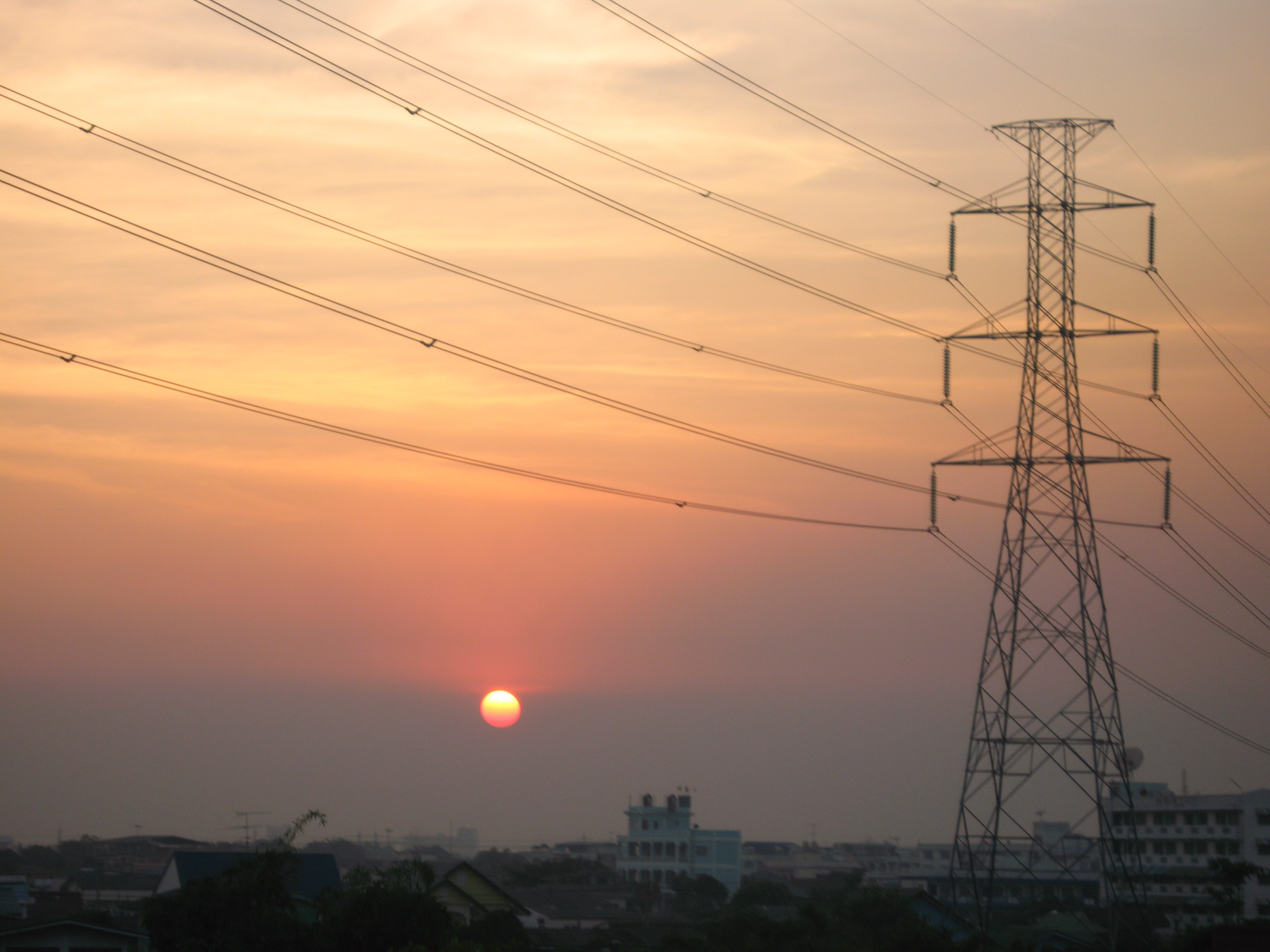
Transmission tower in Samut Prakan Province.

Over seventy percent of Thai installed electrical generating capacity is conventional thermal. Oil-fired plants have been replaced by natural gas, which generate most (64.2%) of Thailand's electricity, an increase of 103% from 2000 to 2023. Coal-fired plants produce an additional 14.6%, with the remainder mostly from biofuels, hydro, solar and wind power. In 2024, 15% of Thailand's electricity was generated from low carbon sources, well below the global average of 41%.

Around 100% of the population has electricity access. Thailand's electricity consumption was 2.965 MWh / Capita in 2023, representing a 105% increase since 2000. Thailand has relatively high electricity consumption per capita compared with other countries in Southeast Asia. The Electricity Generating Authority of Thailand (EGAT) accounts for about 29% of Thailand's electricity generation capacity. Independent Power Producers supply about 35%, Small Power Producers about 17%, and electricity imports roughly 11%. Electricity distribution is the responsibility of the Metropolitan Electricity Authority for Bangkok, Nonthaburi, and Samut Prakan, and the Provincial Electricity Authority for the rest of the country.

Rising temperatures due to climate change increase electricity demand. It is estimated that cities the size of Bangkok may require as much as 2 gigawatts of additional electricity for each increase of 1 degree Celsius in temperature due to increased demand for air conditioning.

For example, an April 2024 heatwave in Thailand led to a large increase in electricity consumption due to an ongoing severe heat wave. The country recorded a historic peak in electricity usage at 34,443.1 megawatts, surpassing the previous record of 34,130.5 megawatts set in May 2023. This significant spike in power usage is primarily driven by the revival of key sectors such as business and tourism, which are still rebounding alongside the extreme temperatures. The EGAT has acknowledged this trend and now anticipates that electricity demand may further escalate, potentially exceeding 35,000 megawatts in the near future.

Energy analysts have reported that Thailand has significant potential to generate much more electricity from renewable sources, particularly solar power. Ember argue that Thailand could expand renewable generation substantially by increasing solar capacity and integrating battery storage to balance supply and demand.

=== History of the electricity sector ===
==== Anand Panyarachun government ====
The government of Anand Panyarachun (1991–1992) began the process of energy industry liberalisation. Its reforms included:

- Allowing private companies, independent power producers (IPPs), to build and operate power generation plants, selling all of their output to the Electricity Generating Authority of Thailand (EGAT)
- Allowing smaller private companies, SPPs or small power producers, to build and operate small power generation plants (mostly co-generation plants), selling a portion of their output to EGAT
- Delegating to the National Energy Policy Organisation (NEPO) the task of developing a master plan for the privatisation of EGAT. Piyasawat Amranand, head of NEPO, designed a plan which would closely replicate the English power pool, break EGAT up into several smaller companies, and privatise the smaller companies.

==== Chuan Leekpai government ====
The subsequent government of Chuan Leekpai (1992–1995, 1997–2001) continued Anand's policies, with Sawit Bhodivihok taking a leading role in industry reform. The reforms were fiercely attacked by members of the EGAT, Metropolitan Electricity Authority (MEA), and Provincial Electricity Authority (PEA) unions. As a result, no significant changes in industry structure or ownership occurred during Chuan's term.

==== Thaksin Shinawatra government ====
===== Refining and pipelines =====
In September 2001, the National Energy Policy Office approved the partial listing of PTT, the state-owned oil and gas company. PTT swiftly became the largest company by market capitalisation upon listing in the Stock Exchange of Thailand (SET). PTT greatly profited from the global increase in worldwide oil prices following the 2003 invasion of Iraq, and the rise in its stock price helped propel the SET to a boom. However, anti-Thaksin critics have claimed that PTT's bull run was due to manipulation by Thaksin.

===== Attempted privatisation of EGAT =====
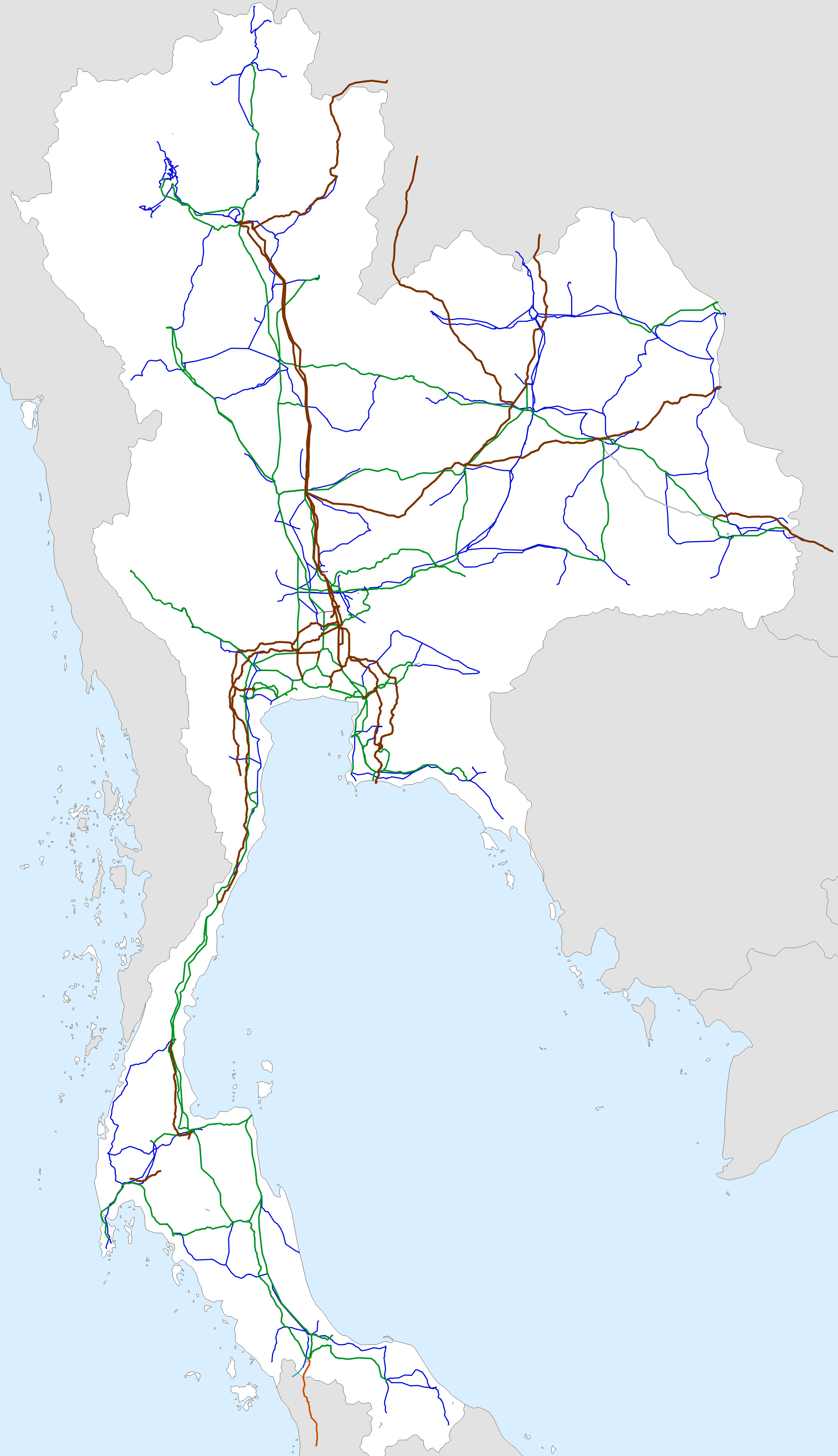
Electrical power grid with 500 kV (brown), 225 kV (green) and 110 kV (blue) lines in 2022

Under Shinawatra the government pursued the corporatisation and planned IPO of the Electricity Generating Authority of Thailand (EGAT) to raise approximately 42 billion baht for new gas-fired power plants, framing privatisation as a modernisation and capital-raising strategy. However in 2004 strong employee protests, civil society opposition, and concerns over regulatory weakness and conflicts of interest intensified political resistance. This culminated in a 23 March 2006 ruling by the Supreme Administrative Court of Thailand that nullified EGAT's transformation into EGAT PLC on grounds, including flawed public hearings and improper retention of state expropriation powers, effectively halting the privatisation and making it a landmark judicial reversal of state enterprise reform in Thailand.

=== International electricity exchanges ===
In 2024 electricity imports from Lao PDR served 15% of Thailand's electricity demand. Electricity imports have risen by over 1000% since 2000.

In 2021, eight Laotian power plants, with a combined generation capacity of 5,420 MW, were committed to exporting their production to Thailand. Among these, seven were hydroelectric plants (3,947 MW) and one a coal-fired plant (1,473 MW). In August 2021 the Electricity Generating Authority of Thailand planned to import an additional 1,200 MW from Laos' hydropower plants under a long-term purchase contract, bringing the total purchases to 10,200 MW21.

== Policy and energy transition ==
Under the draft Power Development Plan (2024-2037) Thailand aims to significantly expand renewable energy (aiming for a 33% and 51% renewables share by 2030 and 2037 respectively) with solar, biomass, hydropower and wind as key sources. This is an update to the Alternative Energy Development Plan (2018–2037) which initially aimed for renewables to account for 37% of total final energy consumption by 2037. Solar is a key renewable under the new plan, and Thailand will also import clean energy from neighboring countries, particularly hydropower.

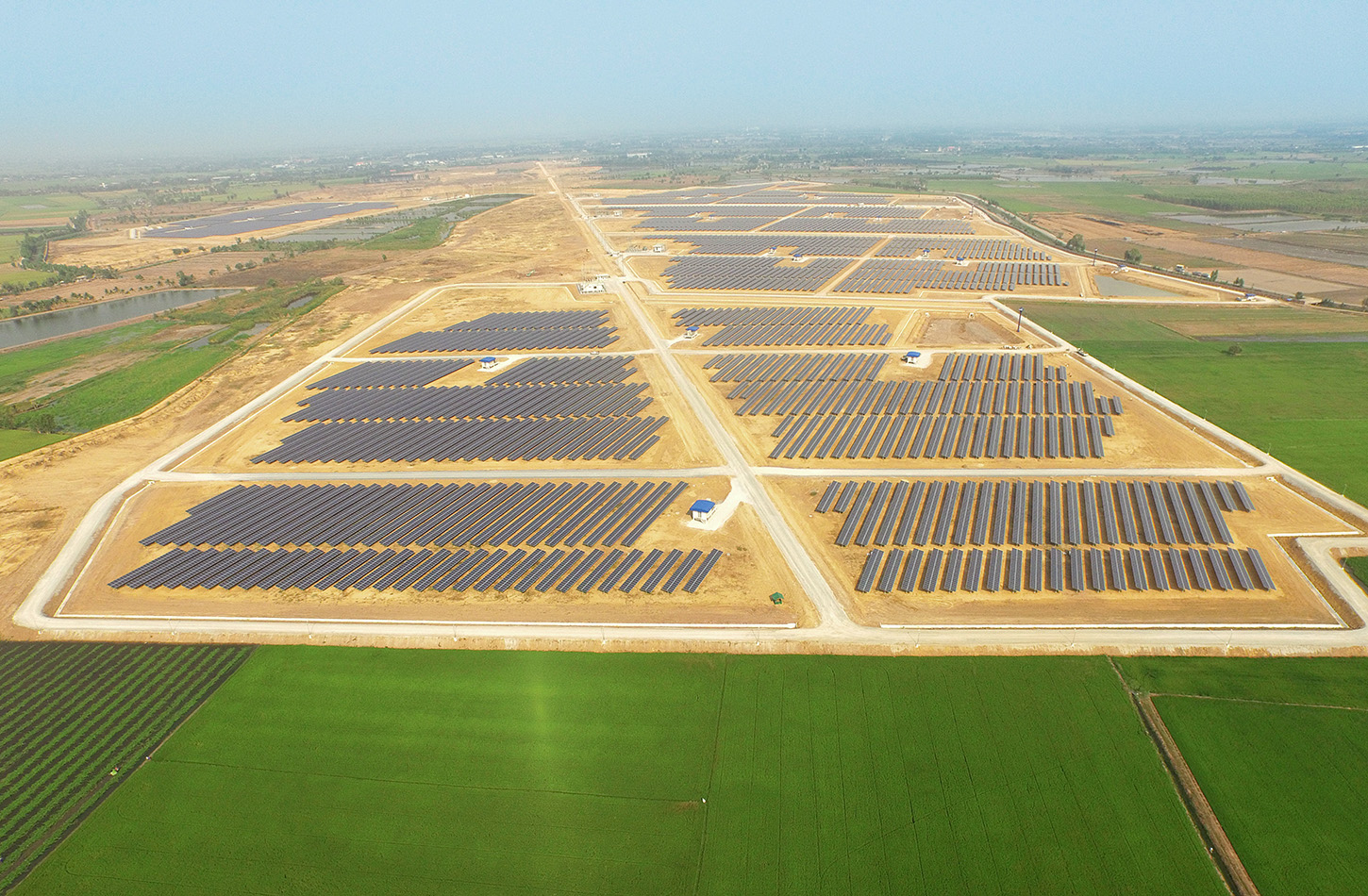
B.Grimm Yanhee Solar Power facility in Nakhon Pathom Province.

However some analysts note that Thailand's current power planning still allocates a modest share to variable renewables like solar and wind in the short term. At the same time, the electricity strategy outlined in the Power Development Plan includes maintaining a significant role for natural gas and other dispatchable sources. Energy and policy analysts assert that it may slow the deployment of variable renewables. Some policy analysts argue that overestimated electricity demand forecasts in planning documents may justify unnecessary power plant construction, despite underutilisation of existing facilities, potentially increasing electricity prices for consumers.

To achieve its climate goals, Thailand's Long-Term Low Emissions Development Strategy (LT-LEDS) estimates that renewables will account for 68% of electricity generation by 2040 and 74% by 2050, while also targeting 50% of new power generation capacity additions to come from renewable sources by 2050.

While Thailand has made important steps toward growing renewable capacity, acceleration in finance and investment in renewable power and energy efficiency is still required. The energy transition in Thailand reportedly faces cross-sector misalignment and fragmented and inconsistent policy and plans. The dispersion of responsibility across ministries, coordination challenges and regulatory constraints are additional barriers.

=== Specific policies ===
Thailand's current energy policy is structured around the National Energy Plan (NEP) overseen by the National Energy Policy Council and implemented through several sub-plans covering power generation, renewables, energy efficiency, and fuels. The most important components include the Power Development Plan (PDP), which governs long-term electricity supply and capacity expansion; the Alternative Energy Development Plan (AEDP), which promotes renewable energy across electricity, heat, and biofuels; and the Energy Efficiency Plan (EEP), which focuses on reducing energy demand and improving efficiency in buildings, industry, and transport.

== Energy security risks ==
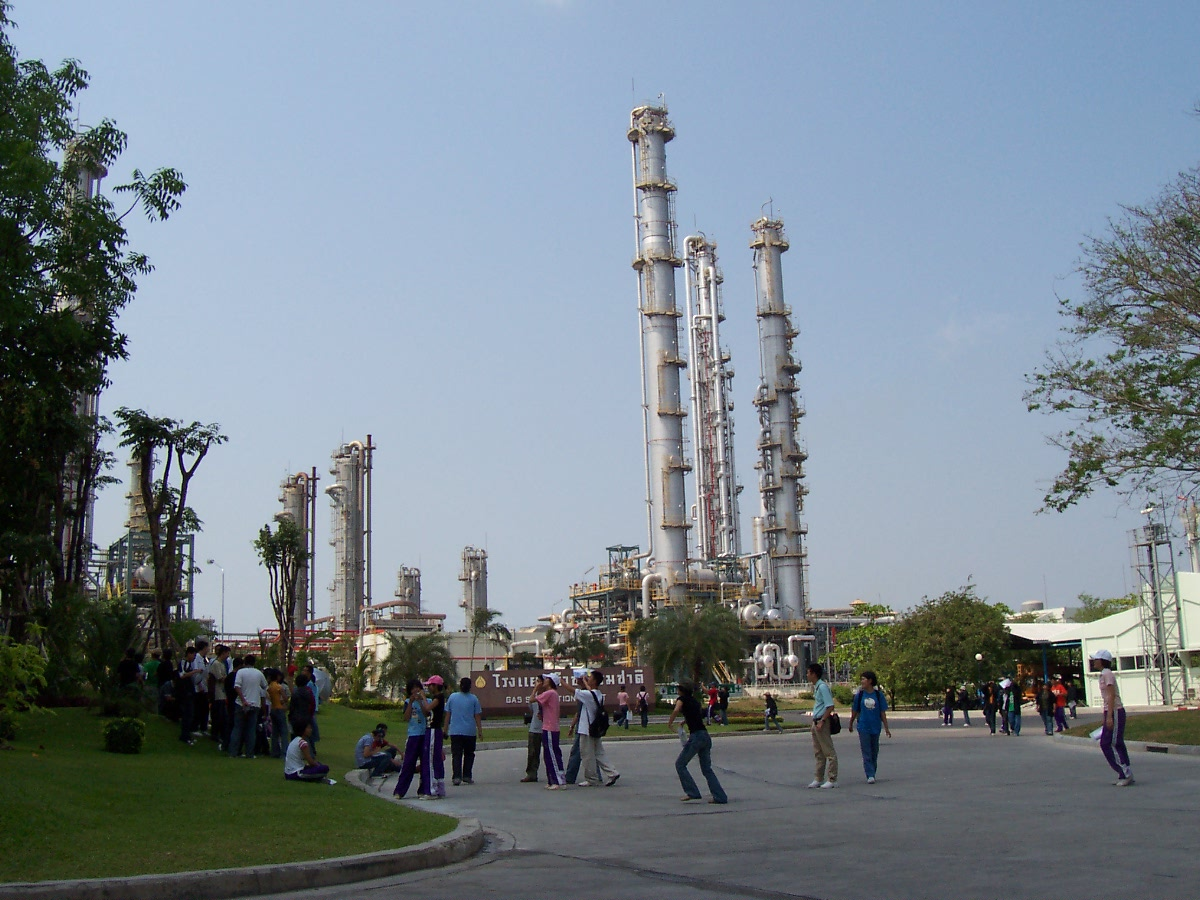
PTT (ปตท.) Natural Gas Separation Plants in Rayong, Thailand.

Thailand faces several energy security risks that could constrain its economic stability and long-term development if not addressed. A major vulnerability is the country's heavy reliance on imported fossil fuels, especially natural gas and liquefied natural gas (LNG). Around 60% of Thailand's electricity is generated from natural gas, most of which must be imported as domestic reserves decline, increasing exposure to global market and foreign exchange volatility. This reliance makes Thailand vulnerable to international gas price spikes and also risks stranded assets if long-term gas infrastructure contracts lock in carbon-intensive capacity that may be uneconomic as renewables become cheaper. Thailand's existing gas power plants are also underutilised and face project delays and rising costs.

Thailand's imported energy dependency (imported sources account for more than half of its energy consumption) also exposes the country to supply disruptions from geopolitical tensions, shipping chokepoints (such as the Strait of Hormuz), and regional instability which could interrupt fuel deliveries.

Extreme weather intensified by climate change (extreme heat, droughts, and floods) can damage grid infrastructure and strain peak energy demand (for example, increased air conditioning use during heat waves). This increases blackout risk.

As renewable penetration rises, Thailand will face grid integration challenges which require transmission and storage upgrades to manage the power variability solar and wind can create. Without adequate planning and investment for this, renewables development will be slowed despite the increased demand for clean electricity.

== Environmental impacts ==
Energy production and consumption in Thailand have significant environmental impacts, particularly due to the continued reliance on fossil fuels such as natural gas, coal, and petroleum. In 2018 almost 70% of Thailand's greenhouse gas emissions were from the energy sector. Electricity generation from coal and gas-fired power plants contributes to greenhouse gas emissions and local air pollution. Lignite mining and combustion have been associated with particulate pollution and ecological degradation in affected regions.

Large energy infrastructure projects like hydropower dams and transmission lines alter river ecosystems and landscapes. Renewable energy development, especially biomass from agricultural residues, has expanded in recent decades, although some projects have raised concerns about air pollution from biomass burning and land-use impacts.

== Human rights ==
Energy development in Thailand has contributed to improved living standards and access to essential services. Thailand's near universal electricity access has supported economic development, education and healthcare services, particularly in rural areas.

However, energy development in Thailand has also raised human rights and social concerns, particularly in relation to land use, community participation and environmental health. Some proposed coal-fired power plants and large energy projects, such as the Burapa power plant, have faced opposition from local communities and civil society organisations, who argue that consultation processes and environmental impact assessments have not always adequately addressed local concerns. The Mukdahan wind turbine project has been challenged on similar grounds of disregarding local community interests, and concerns over environmental damage and loss of livelihoods. Hydropower projects in neighbouring countries that export electricity to Thailand have also been criticised by advocacy groups for their effects on communities along the Mekong River basin. In 2024, 12.3 million people in Thailand were diagnosed with diseases caused by air pollution, with the highest number of cases recorded in the northern region of the country.

== See also ==
- Economy of Thailand#Energy
- Nuclear power in Thailand
- Electricity Generating Authority of Thailand
- Metropolitan Electricity Authority
- Provincial Electricity Authority
