= History of Isan =

The history of Isan (Thai: อีสาน, pronounced [ʔiː sǎːn]) has been determined by its geography, situated as it is on the Korat Plateau between Cambodia, Laos, and Thailand.

The national government claimed that the name "Isan" was derived from Sanskrit Īśāna, a name of Shiva they claimed referred to his rule of the northeast (Sanskrit īśānya). This interpretation was intended to reinforce Isan's identity as the northeast of Thailand, rather than as part of the Lao kingdom because of the fear of the Lao people seceding.

The Thai king Vajiravudh reinvoked the ancient name, designating the northeast sector of the Rattanakosin Kingdom "Isan". Previously, in the reign of Chulalongkorn in early 20th century, the sector was generally called Hua Mueang Lao (Lao Townships หัวเมืองลาว) for the area north of Nakhon Ratchasima (Korat) and Khamen Pa Dong (Wilderness Khmer, เขมรป่าดง) for the townships to the east. Later, the term Isan came into wide, if unofficial, use as a term for the northeastern region, and khon Isan (Isan people, คนอีสาน) as a general term for the peoples of Isan.

Isan has been dominated by each of its neighbors in turn, although its relative infertility meant it was more often a battleground than a prize. Rather than being incorporated into the respective empires of each power, the area was divided into mueang ("city-states", เมือง), each paying tribute to one or more powers under the mandala system.

Throughout the 20th century, the Thai government took steps to cement Isan's status as a part of Thailand and to de-emphasize the Lao, Khmer and Kuy origins of its population, a process known as Thaification.

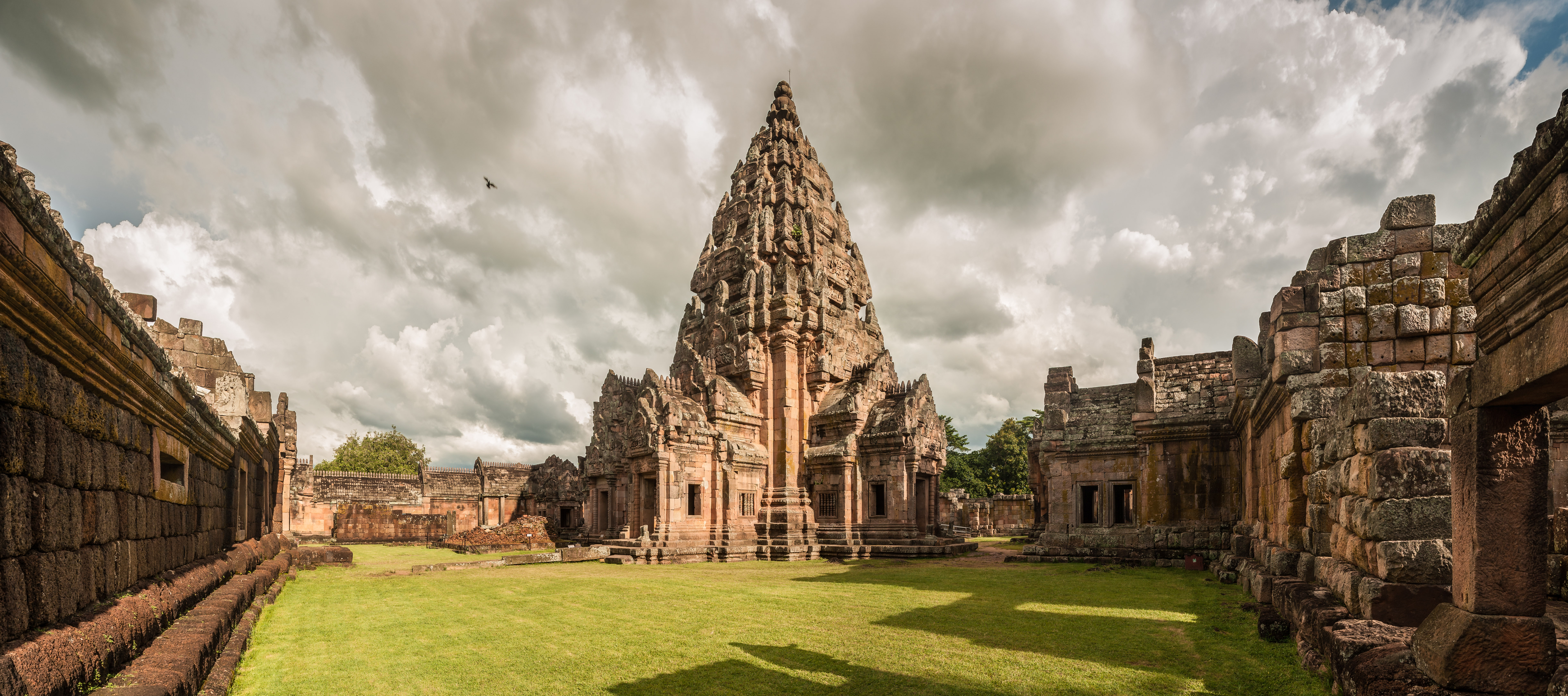
Phanom Rung in Buriram.

The majority of people in present-day Isan speak the Lao language known as Isan. Many Khmer speakers live in the southern half and substantial minorities of Katuic speakers (i.e., Kuy, Bru, and So) also exist. Most Isan people are both conversant and to some degree literate in Central Thai. Before the central government introduced the Thai alphabet and language in regional schools, the people of Isan wrote in the Lao alphabet, a very similar script that Thai adopted. Most people still speak the Isan language, a dialect of the Lao language, as their first language. A significant minority in the south also speak Northern Khmer.

The Kuy people, an Austroasiatic people concentrated around the core of what was once the Chenla Kingdom and known as the Khmer Boran "ancient Khmer", are a link to the region's pre-Tai history.

== Prehistory ==
Four Homo erectus fossil skull fragments found in northern Thailand's Hat Pudui cave (Ko Kha District, Lampang Province) by Thai paleontologists Somsak Pramankij and Vadhana Subhavanin, were in deposits dating from the mid-Pleistocene era, which was before the Khorat Plateau had uplifted from an extensive plain. Professor Phillip V. Tobias of Johannesburg's University of the Witwatersrand examined the fragments and said: "It seems unavoidable but to conclude that Thailand must have been a highway or crossroads in the movement of hominids — members of the family of man."

Pha Taem cliff paintings alongside the Mekong in Udon Thani Province date to around 1500 BC. They are younger than but similar in composition to the Rock Paintings of Hua Mountain in southern China, which are attributed to the Luoyue people of what is today the lowland plains of northern Vietnam, particularly the marshy, agriculturally rich area of the Red River Delta, and particularly associated with the Bronze Age Đông Sơn culture of mainland Southeast Asia.

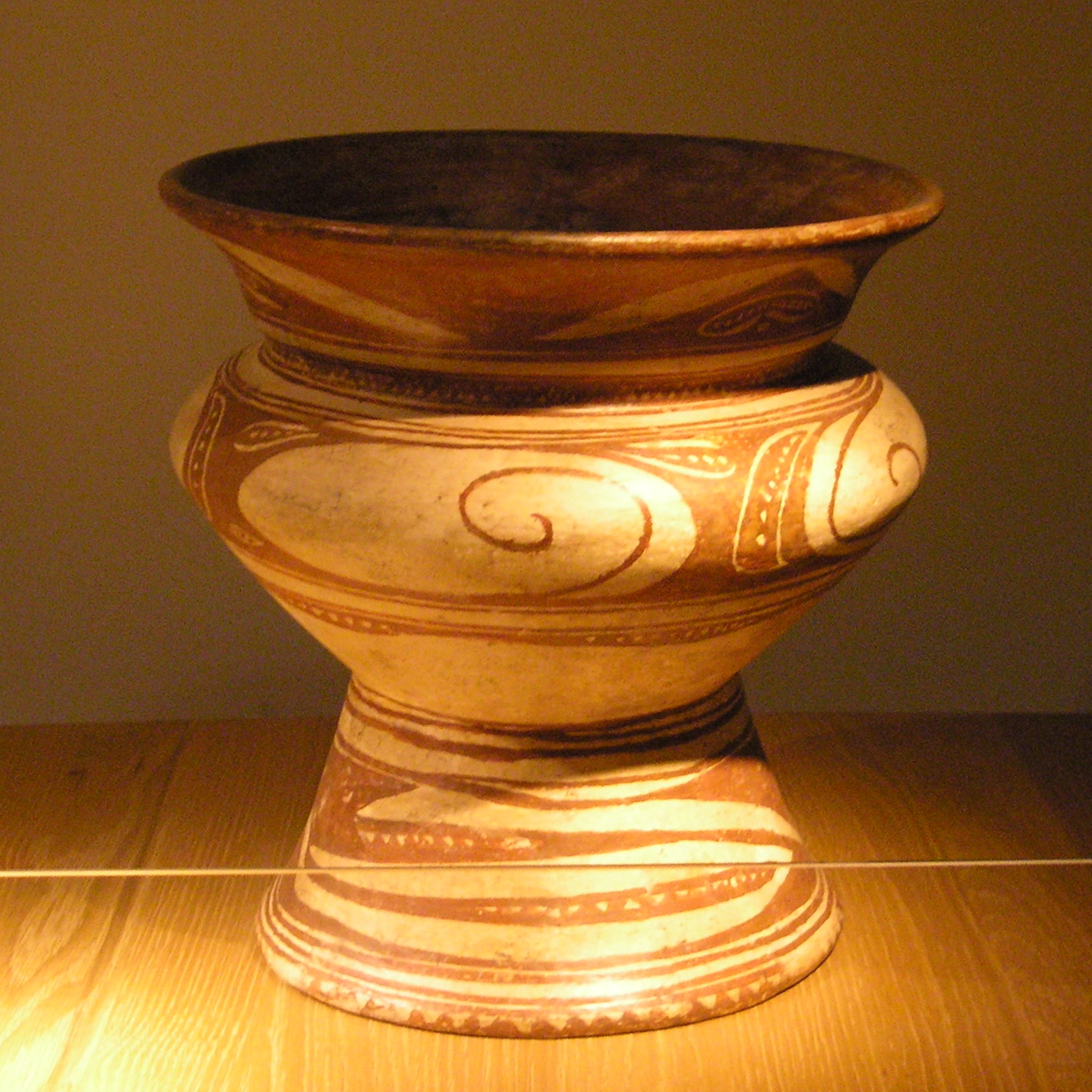
Ban Chiang pottery in the Museum für Indische Kunst, Berlin-Dahlem

The Ban Chiang archaeological site, dating from around 3000 BC to 300 AD, attracted attention in 1966 as seemingly the world's oldest site showing traces of a Bronze Age culture, due to errors in dating. In Fine Arts, the site is remarkable for its pottery; further investigation into ancient skeletal remains raised serious questions about transitions to sedentism and intensified agriculture. The question as to why the site was abandoned until resettled by 19th–century Lao émigrés remains to be settled. The Bronze Age site of Ban Non Wat in the southeast of the plateau is also under investigation (2002–present.)

== Early history ==
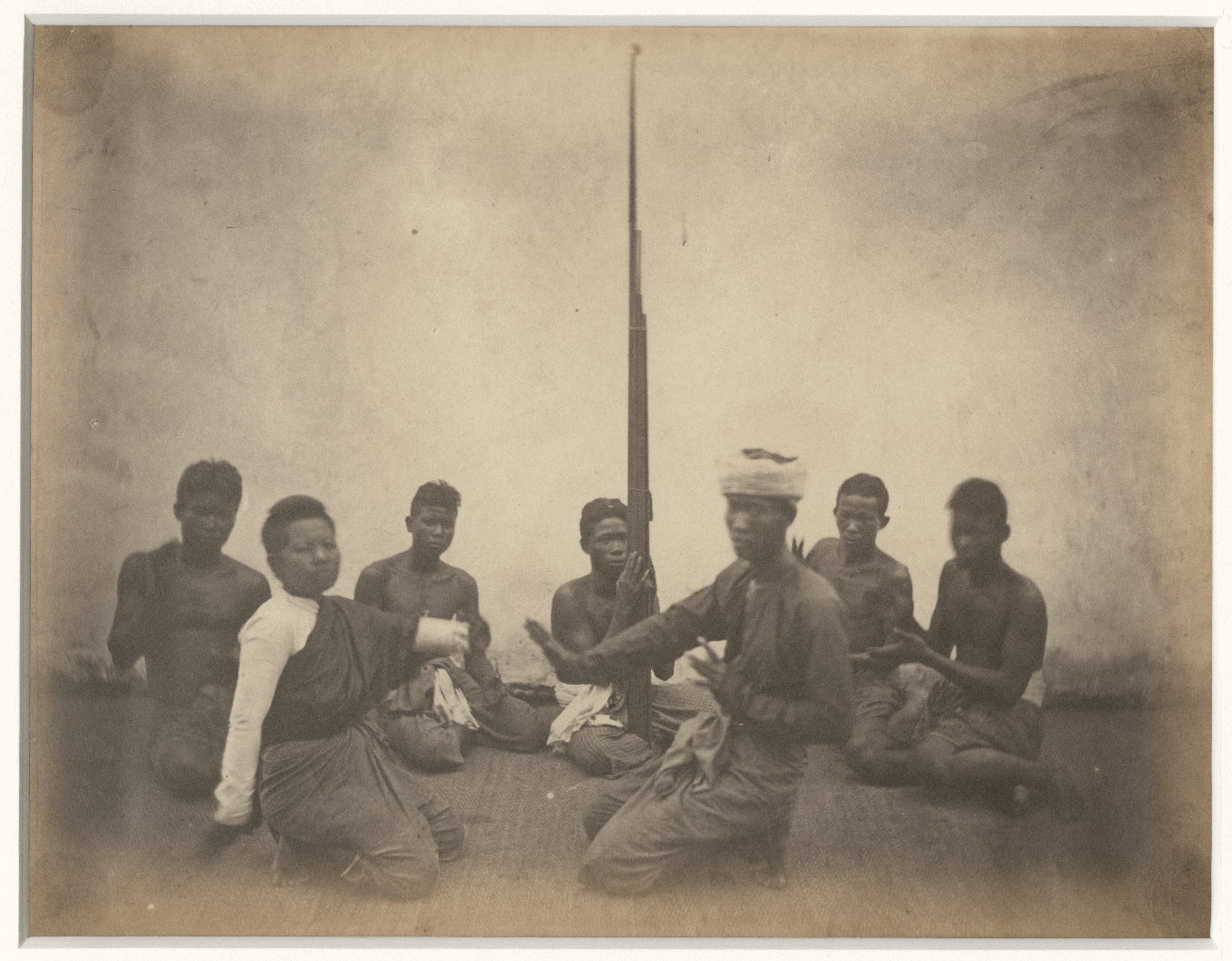
Isan Lao people reciting story

The first major civilisation to occupy Isan was considered, by the study of artifacts, to be Dvaravati. The remains of walled and moated towns scattered the region, in the valleys of Chi and Mun Rivers. The remains often show the Buddhist and Hinduist influence, perhaps expanding from the western part or the coastal and the Chao Phraya River basin.

To obtain a fuller and more correct picture of the society and culture of the early urban life on the Khorat Plateau, we must, as Professors Thiva and Srisakra have argued, undertake considerably more archaeological research than has been done thus far. And, I would add, we can further increase our understanding of these societies through systematic research on a number of the indigenous legends of the Thai-Lao people of northeastern Thailand.

— Keyes, Charles F. (March 1974). "A Note on the Ancient Towns and Cities of Northeastern Thailand" (PDF). Southeast Asian Studies. 11 (4). Kyoto: Kyoto University: 497–506.

== Khmer Domination ==
From the 11th century, the Dvaravati or Mon culture from the Chao Phraya River basin was gradually displaced by the Khmer Empire of Angkor. Many principal centers became Angkor's tributary states. Consequently, a number of temples influenced by ancient Khmer art were found in Isan, most notably in southern part, at Phanom Rung and Phimai, which lie on the so-called Ancient Khmer Highway, the direct link to Angkor. Inscriptions found also told the connections between vassal towns and the court of Angkor.

== Sukhothai ==
The Sukhothai Kingdom broke free from the Angkor Empire around the 13th century. Although Isan is not thought to have been a part of the Sukhothai kingdom due to the lack of clear evidence, the Khmer empire became weaker and retreated to its Cambodian heartlands, leaving Isan in the hands of fragmented muang (เมือง) city-states or statelets. However, many Khmer-speaking people remained and are still a prominent fixture in the southern area, constituting the majority in present-day southern part of the region such as in present-day Surin Province, Buriram Province and are also numerous in part of Sisaket Province.

== Lan Xang ==
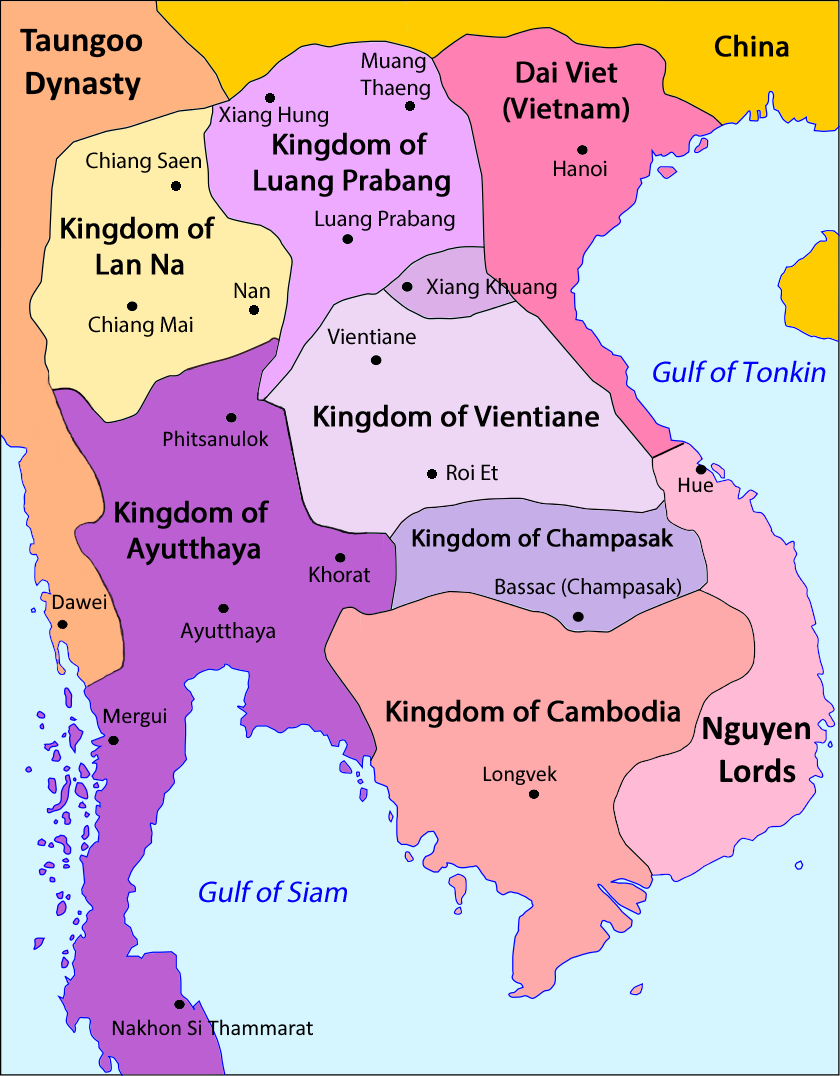
Isan and Southeast Asia in the 18th century

The Lao kingdom of Lan Xang was established in Luang Prabang in the 14th century by Fa Ngum. The kingdom's name means Million Elephants, echoing the name of the neighboring northern kingdom of Lan Na "Million Rice Paddies". As the Khmer Empire continued to retreat under pressure from the neighboring Tai kingdoms of the Ayutthaya Kingdom and Lan Xang. Ayutthaya established a presence at Nakhon Ratchasima and Phimai. However, the bulk of the Khorat Plateau fell into the mandala of Lan Xang.

Lao settlers began gradually moving across the Mekong into Isan between the 14th and 16th centuries. Major cities were established at Loei, Viang Khuk, Nong Khai, Nong Bua Lamphu (traditionally held by the crown prince), Sakon Nakhon, Nakhon Phanom, Roi Et, Suwannaphume, and Champasak. Additional settlements were located Nong Han Noi, Mahukhanakhon, and a number of settlements across the Mekong from Vientiane including Sri Xiang Mai, Phon Phao, Tha Bo, Say Fong, and Phon Phisai. Many of these early settlements were destroyed or abandoned in the aftermath of the Lao rebellion (1826-1828). Lan Xang was divided by a succession dispute after the death of King Sourigna Vongsa in 1700, into the competing Kingdom of Vientiane, Kingdom of Luang Phrabang and Kingdom of Champasak. Most of what would become the Isan was split between Vientiane and Champasak.

== Siam ==
With the rise of King Taksin, his Thonburi Kingdom began expanding direct control over the region. Thonburi forces invaded and took control of the Kingdom of Luang Phrabang and the Kingdom of Vientiane and Isan entered its direct orbit.

In 1718, Lao settlers in the company of an official in the service of King Nokasad of the Kingdom of Champasak founded mueang Suwannaphum.

During late 18th century, the Lao kingdoms of Luang Phrabang and Champasak were increasingly at odds with Vientiane. As Vientiane struggled to maintain control of Isan, a number of dissidents began migrating from Vientiane and taking refuge in Isan. Most of them recognized Siam as their suzerain according to the mandala system. Under this system, mueang leaders were granted something equivalent to a fiefdom and a noble title as governor, having full right of rulership over their towns. Thus they eventually became the subjects of the royal court in Bangkok. New towns were founded such and Chaiyaphum along with many minor towns such as Han Chai Cham Na.

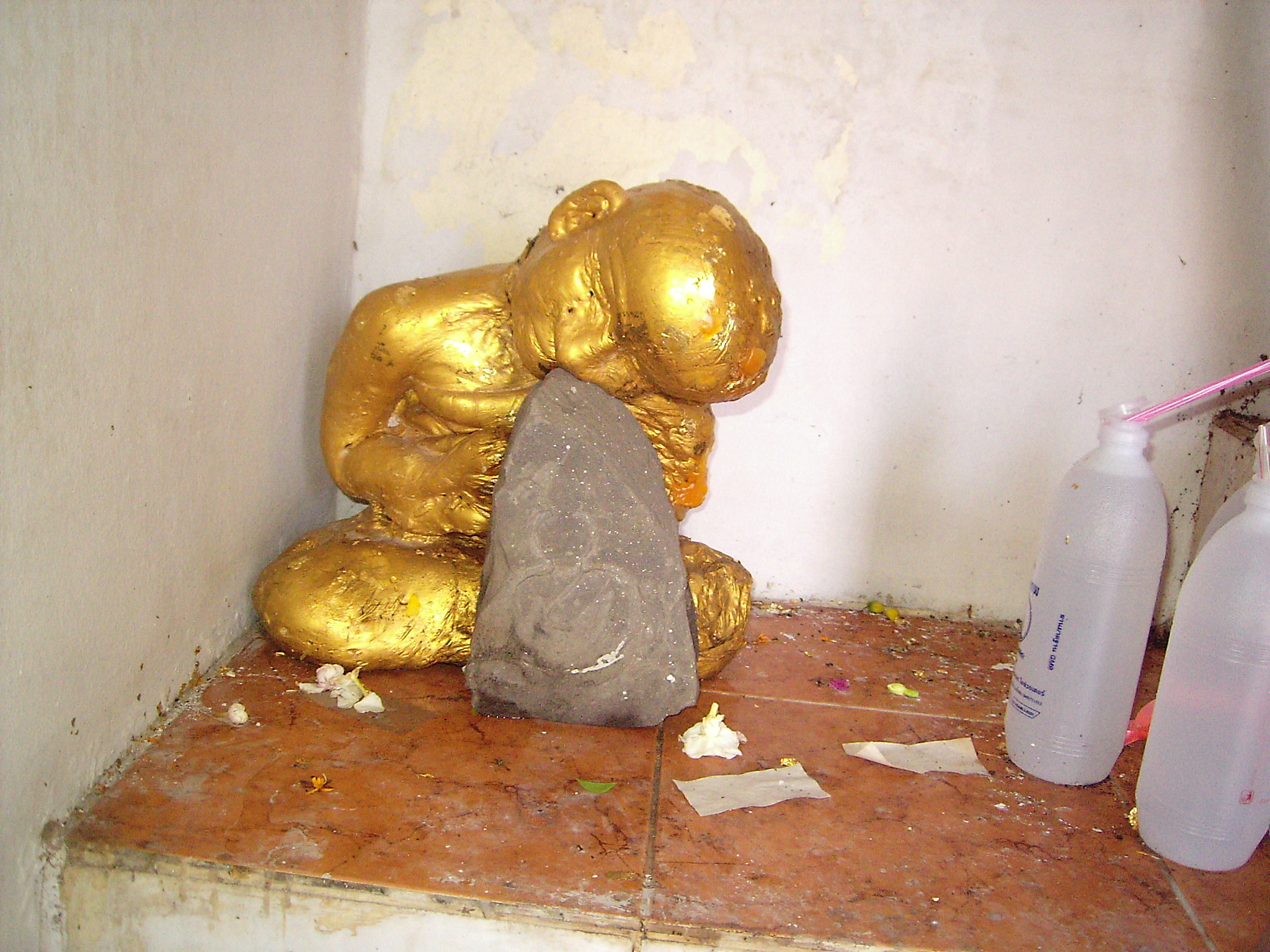
Figure in northeast corner of victory monument in Yasothon facing Bangkok

In 1827, King Anouvong of Vientiane rebelled against Siam. After a successful attack on the stronghold of Korat, he was defeated and in Yasothon a memorial to the defeat was raised. The defeat of Anu's revolt was followed by forced migrations from defeated Lao kingdoms to Isan, further increasing the dominance of Lao culture in the region but weakening the mueang of the Lao. The governors of these new towns were semi-autonomous. They had right to rule, to tax their own subject, part of which might be transferred to Bangkok periodically. If time of war, these local rulers had a duty to send troops to defend Siam.

Following defeat in the Franco-Siamese conflict, Siam ceded Luang Phrabang and Champasak to France in 1893 and 1904. Isan became the kingdom's northeast frontier as the buffer zone between French Indochina and Siam, with Siam becoming a 'buffer zone' between the United Kingdom and France with the Entente Cordiale. Thus began the process of annexation of Isan area into the modern Siamese nation.

Prince Damrong Rajanubhab as the new Minister of Interior (1892) introduced the monthon administration system known as Thesaphiban (เทศาภิบาล - literally, control over territory) - officially adopted by the 1897 Local Administration Act, which transferred much power from the traditional provincial governors drawn from the local nobility to the newly established monthon commissioners and civil servants (รองอำมาตย์ - court support) appointed by Bangkok. In 1902, local revolts broke out in Isan, often led by charismatic religious leaders called Phu Me Boon (ผู้มีบุญ) or Phi Bun ผีบุญ (Holy man). One of the most serious of these rebellions (Prakot Kan Pi Bun ปรากฏการณ์ผีบุญ) recalled the resistance to Thonburi authority by the monk Chao Phra Faang, 1768–70. A former monk and Phu Mi Bun in the Ubon Ratchathani area headed a millenarian sect inspired by his predictions of 'apocalyptic' vision. His apocalyptic prophecy created panic among almost all of the Isan people until the Bangkok government eventually crushed it.

From the 20th century onwards, Siam gradually consolidated its control over Isan through a programme of Thaification. The introduction of a national school system in the 1920s replaced instruction by monks in the Isan Lao language with teaching in the Thai language only. Radio and television, when they began, also broadcast in Thai. They included (and still do) twice daily broadcasts of the Thai National Anthem.

Even after the Revolution in 1932, when democratic rule began, Isan was ignored by the new Thai government. Most of the region was underdeveloped. Apparently new or necessary infrastructure were hardly built. Albeit the biggest part of Thailand, until now, there are still only two railways in the region and most of modern paved roads were built in the 1960s and 1970s.

== Communism ==
In the latter half of the 20th century, Isan was perceived by the Thai government as a potential breeding ground for Communism. The region's poverty, special history, remoteness and inaccessible terrain all contributed to this fear.

Inevitably, the extent to which Communist insurgents were a real threat in Isan is hard to determine. It is known that there were a number of political attacks from the 1960s onwards, and that Communist activists and equipment entered the region from Laos. On the other hand, the number of guerrillas probably never exceeded a few thousand, and the combination of action by the security forces and the offers of amnesties had largely ended the threat by the early 1980s.

== US bases ==
The fight against Communism persuaded the government to allow the establishment of a number of US bases in Isan, notably in the provinces of Nakhon Ratchasima, Nakhon Phanom, Udon Thani, Nakhon Sawan and Ubon Ratchathani. Although the bases were directed at Communists in Laos, Cambodia and Vietnam, they had an indirect effect in promoting development and opposing Communism in Isan. The bases required the creation of improved transport links, facilitating the integration of Isan with the rest of Thailand. The most important of these was Highway 2 named the Mittraphap Road (Friendship Highway,) which links with Bangkok and Isan. and other northeast highways that being with the numeral 2, which link the region's major cities with each other. These remain Isan's primary road links, with many later to be incorporated into the 21st-century Asian Highway Network. Complemented by Thai government programs to build minor roads, these projects did much to bind rural Isan more closely to the cities and to Bangkok.

The number of US servicemen reached its peak in 1969 at 50,000. This influx of US personnel also had a direct effect in exposing the region to western culture. This helped to promote the development of the region, but it also created a sizable sex industry in the vicinity of the bases. Finally, the US military presence contributed substantial sums of money to the area's economy, with emigrant-spouses who accompanied American servicemen continuing to send substantial sums home. The bases were closed at the end of the Vietnam War in 1975.

== Development ==
The Thai government promoted development in Isan as one weapon in the fight against Communism. In particular, Field Marshal Sarit Dhanarajata, who took control of the country in 1958, was a native of Isan and promoted a number of development projects there.

From the 1960s onwards, the government launched a string of development programmes aimed wholly or in part at Isan. These began with a five-year development plan announced in 1961 and backed by US aid. The program's "top down" approach was satirized in a country song still being sung decades later. An Accelerated Rural Development Programme followed in 1964, again with US support. This was administered by provincial governors in the hope of circumventing the inefficiencies of central government, but it could not evade the problems of bureaucracy, corruption and a conservative mindset which hampered all development efforts.

1960s projects to introduce improved crop strains have been criticised for forcing farmers to take out loans to pay for the seed, fertiliser and equipment required, while reducing genetic diversity. Even in the 1970s, government per capita spending on rural assistance programmes was lower in Isan than anywhere else in Thailand.

Nevertheless, much was achieved: Mobile Rural Development Units focusing on health education trained about 1000 field workers per year in the late 1960s; hydroelectric schemes such as Nam Pong/Ubon Ratana power station in Khon Kaen and Lam Pao in Kalasin provided electricity; modern toilets were distributed; government rice purchase programmes maintained prices.

Education efforts increased the proportion of children attending high school from 4.4% in 1970 to 80% by 2000. Universities were established beginning with Khon Kaen University in 1964, soon followed by Mahasarakham University and Suranaree University of Technology.

== Recent history ==
An important political issue at the end of the 20th century was the construction of the Pak Mun dam in the district of Khong Chiam, in Ubon Ratchathani Province. The project was completed in 1994, flooding 117 square kilometres of land and displacing around 3000 families. The project has been criticised for insufficient compensation payments, adverse effects on the fisheries of the Mun River, and failure to produce the projected power output.

Protesters against the Pak Mun dam joined with other grassroots activists in 1995 to form the Assembly of the Poor, a group seeking to promote the involvement of the poor in decision-making processes, and to have their interests taken into account. The group has organised a number of protests against the project in Bangkok. The now deposed prime minister, Thaksin Shinawatra, responded by claiming that activists NGO Living River Siam are trouble-makers who do not reflect the opinions of ordinary people. The same issue arose with the Rasi Salai Dam in Sisaket Province, which was also completed in 1994 for the generation of electricity; it was abandoned for that purpose in 2000 and converted into a recreation area.

== See also ==
- Decline of Angkor & the Emergence of a Theravada Kingdom (section)
- Khorat Plateau (Geography, Geology and Archeology sections)
- Nang Ai, Phadaeng, and Phangkhi (section)
- Peopling of Laos
