= Ban Khu Mueang ancient city =

- เมืองโบราณบ้านคูเมือง (Thai)
- Interactive map of Ban Khu Mueang ancient city
- 16°01′10″N 101°44′51″E
- Type: Human settlement
- Periods: Pre-history
- Cultures: Dvaravati; Rattanakosin
- Associated with: Mon people; Lao people; Thai people
- Location: Nong Bua Daeng, Chaiyaphum, Thailand

History
- Built: 1st: c. 6th century; 2nd: c. 18th century
- Abandoned: 1st: c. 11th century; 2nd: 1827

Site notes
- Material: Brick, Laterite, Sandstone, Ceramics
- Area: 0.27 square kilometres (27 ha)
- Condition: Mostly destroyed
- Owner: Private
- Public access: Yes

Mueang Boran Ban Khu Mueang (Thai: เมืองโบราณบ้านคูเมือง) was a small ancient moated settlement located in Khu Mueang subdistrict, Nong Bua Daeng, Chaiyaphum, northeastern Thailand. It was founded around the 6th century during the Dvaravati period.

The city was probably abandoned following the decline of the Dvaravati civilization during the 10th–11th century and was then repopulated in the 18th century by Muen Kuan (หมื่นก๊วน), an aide-de-camp of Phraya Phakdee Chumphon from Vientiane. The city was left abandoned again during the Lao rebellion against Siam in 1827.

== Layout and location ==
The ancient city of Ban Khu Mueang is located 1 kilometer north of Ban Nong Paeng (บ้านหนองแพง) in the Khu Mueang subdistrict of Nong Bua Daeng, Chaiyaphum province, Thailand. It was a rectangular settlement 500–600 meters long on each side surrounded by a layer of an earthen moat. Two streams flow through it, Huai Pong (ห้วยโป่ง) and Huai Mueang (ห้วยเมือง), which both lead to the Chi River 8 kilometers away to the southwest.

According to locals, the city's earthen embankment used to be 3 meters high and the moat 3 meters wide. The city has a single gate on the south.

The site is dated to the Dvaravati period and is related to an old Kaset Sombun (เมืองเก่าเกษตรสมบูรณ์) located 35 kilometers away to the northeast. In addition, there are historic cities dated the same period nearby, such as Mueang Ham Hok and Nakhon Kalong.

== Findings ==
The site has yet to be officially excavated. Archaeological surveys found fragments of pottery, both smooth and with rope marks, stone shards, cotton spun sieves, and some bone fragments. Villagers also said that when tilling the soil, colored beads, gold or bronze rings, pieces of pottery, and bone fragments were often found.

About 1 kilometer outside the ancient moat to the south, during the construction of Kuru Prachanukun School (โรงเรียนคุรุประชานุกูล) on the former graveyard in 1958, bone fragments, broken pots, and jars were found numerously, but no academic study were performed.

To the north of the site, approximately 400 meters, at the present-day Wat Pa Semaram (วัดป่าเสมาราม), villagers previously called Don Bai Sema (ดอนใบเสมา; lit. 'mound of Bai Sema'), numbers of large red sandstone Bai Sema were discovered.
