= Chulabhorn Dam =

Dam in Khon San, Chaiyaphum, Thailand

- Location within Thailand
- Interactive map of Chulabhorn Dam
- Official name: Chulabhorn Dam
- Country: Thailand
- Location: Khon San, Chaiyaphum
- Coordinates: 16°32′10.56″N 101°39′0.13″E
- Construction began: 1970
- Opening date: 1972
- Owner: Electricity Generating Authority of Thailand

Dam and spillways
- Impounds: Nam Phrom River
- Height: 70 m (230 ft)
- Length: 700 m (2,300 ft)

Reservoir
- Creates: Chulabhorn Dam Reservoir
- Total capacity: 165,000,000 m^{3} (5.8×10^{9} ft^{3})
- Catchment area: 545 km^{2} (210 mi^{2})
- Surface area: 31 km^{2} (12 mi^{2})

Power Station
- Operator: Electricity Generating Authority of Thailand
- Installed capacity: 40 MW
- Annual generation: 59 GWh

Chulabhorn Dam (เขื่อนจุฬาภรณ์) is a dam in Tambon Thung Lui Lai, Khon San District, Chaiyaphum Province, Thailand. It impounds the Phrom River, a tributary of the Mekong. The dam has diverted the Nam Phrong River. As water leaves its turbines, it empties into the Choen River. The dam is named for Princess Chulabhorn of Thailand.

== Description ==
Typical of Thai dams, the Chulabhorn Dam is an earth core rockfill dam. Its function is to generate electricity and to irrigate riparian agriculture, except when irrigation is prohibited during droughts. The dam is 700 m (2,300 ft) long and 70 m (230 ft) high. Its reservoir covers 31 km^{2} (12 mi^{2}). A replica of Phra Phutthasiri Sakkharat (Luangpho Chet Kasat) (พระพุทธสิริสัคคราชจำลอง (หลวงพ่อเจ็ดกษัตริย์)) is a Buddha image enshrined on the left side of the dam, opposite Chulabhorn Dam Park. The Chulabhorn Dam Park (สวนเขื่อนจุฬาภรณ์) covers approximately 41 rai.

== Power house ==
The power house is at the dam and contains two turbines, each with a capacity of 20,000 KW. Total annual energy production is 59 Gwh.

== Controversies ==
Like the Pak Mun Dam downstream, the Chulabhorn has not been without its share of controversies. These have principally been over the way in which water is allocated for irrigation vis-à-vis power generation; and over the diversion of water from the Nam Phong to the Choen River, depriving downstream communities along the Choen.

Downstream of the Chulabhorn Dam, along the Choen River, lie three districts: Kaset Sombun District, Ban Thaen District, and Phu Khieo District. The reduced flows of the Choen has driven villagers to band together to persuade the EGAT to increase the flow of water. Protests started in 1973, and have earned the villagers the title of the "water beggars of the Northeast".
