= Sirindhorn Dam =

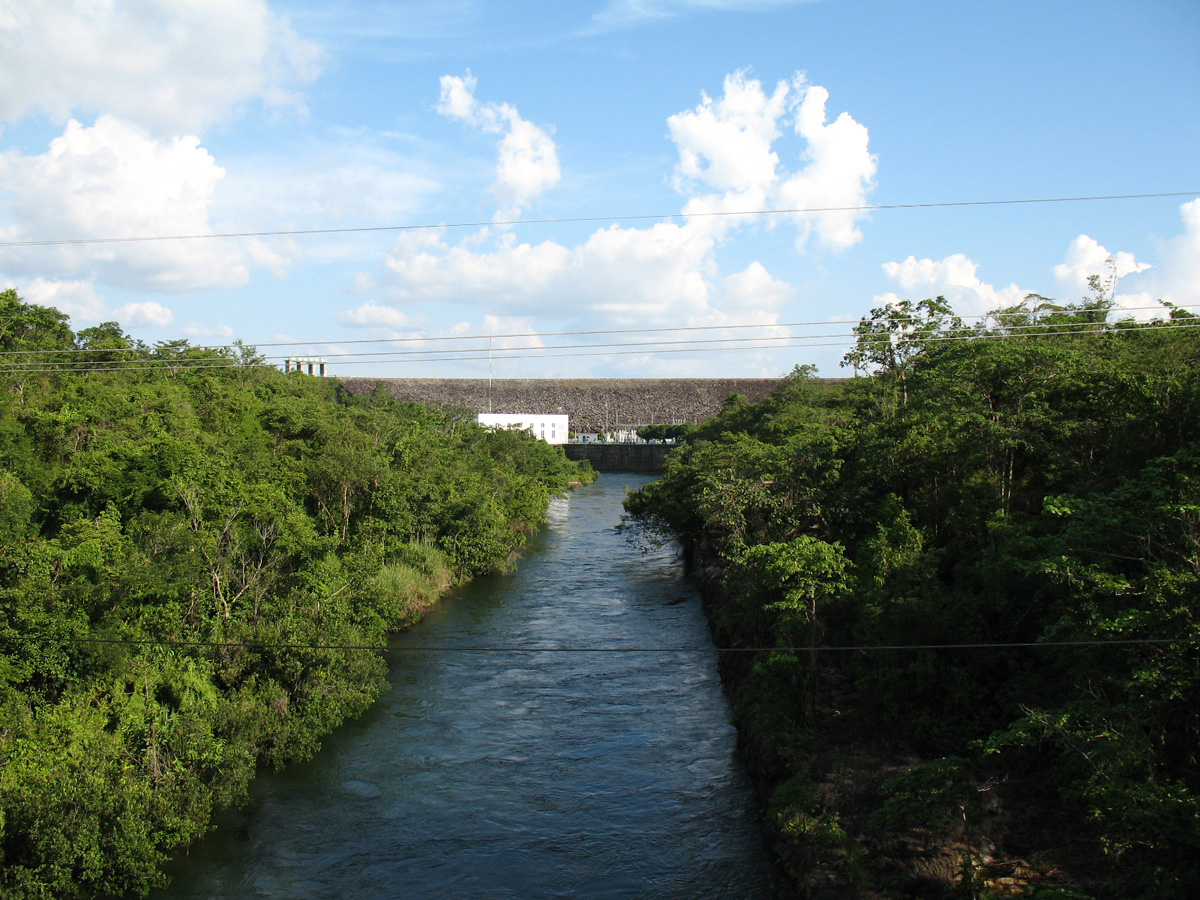
- Downstream face of dam

- Location within Thailand
- Official name: Sirindhorn Dam
- Country: Thailand
- Location: Sirindhorn, Ubon Ratchathani
- Coordinates: 15°12′22.82″N 105°25′44.96″E
- Construction began: 1968
- Opening date: 1971
- Owner: Electricity Generating Authority of Thailand

Dam and spillways
- Type of dam: Earth core rockfill dam
- Impounds: Dom Noi River
- Height: 42 m (138 ft)
- Length: 940 m (3,080 ft)

Reservoir
- Creates: Sirindhorn Reservoir
- Total capacity: 1,966,000,000 m^{3} (1,593,862 acre⋅ft)
- Catchment area: 2,097 km^{2} (810 sq mi)
- Surface area: 288 km^{2} (111 sq mi)
- Maximum length: 43 km (27 mi)
- Maximum water depth: Average: 5.1 m (17 ft)

Power Station
- Operator: Electricity Generating Authority of Thailand
- Installed capacity: 36 MW
- Annual generation: 90 GWh

The Sirindhorn Dam is in Sirindhorn District, Ubon Ratchatani, Thailand. It impounds the Lam Dom Noi River, and its reservoir is the province's largest water resource. The dam was commissioned in 1971 to serve as a hydropower facility as well as to supply irrigation water. The dam was named after Princess Royal Sirindhorn. All of the electricity generated by the dam is destined for domestic markets. The dam was constructed and is owned and operated by the Electricity Generating Authority of Thailand and is located in the Mekong River Basin, just upstream from the controversial Pak Mun Dam.

Some 2,000 villagers were resettled to make way for the dam's reservoir. Many claim they did not receive adequate compensation for the loss of their livelihood and only received compensation for 80% of their land. Furthermore, they claim that the land in the resettlement village is of poor quality and few crops can be grown, and that a proposed irrigation canal was never built.

The reservoir and dam power the Sirindhorn Hydropower Plant, which has an installed capacity of 3 units of 12,000 kilowatts each and annual energy production of 90 GWh.

More than 144,000 floating solar panels were installed in 2021, increasing the power to 45 MW. Though covering less than 1% of the reservoir's surface area, the floating solar panels prevent 460,000 cubic meters of evaporative water loss per year.

There is a park near the dam headquarters and a restaurant and bungalows for visitors. There is a golf course in this area also, at the north end of the lake. The Nature Walkway was introduced in 2021. This viewpoint offers tourists a good overview of the reservoir.

== See also ==
- Mekong
- Mekong River Commission
- Mun River
- Dom Noi River
- Pak Mun Dam
