= Hua Na Dam =

- Country: Thailand
- Location: Kanthararom, Sisaket
- Opening date: 1994
- Construction cost: 2.5 billion baht
- Owner: Electricity Generating Authority of Thailand

Dam and spillways
- Type of dam: Cement Irrigation Dam
- Impounds: Huay Kaosan River
- Height: 17 m (56 ft)
- Length: 207 m (679 ft)

Reservoir
- Creates: Hua Na Dam Reservoir
- Total capacity: 65 m^{3}

Power Station
- Operator: Royal Irrigation Department

Hua Na Dam (Thai: เขื่อนหัวนา, RTGS: Khuean Hua Na, pronounced [kʰɯ̀a̯n hǔa̯ nāː]), in Kanthararom District, Sisaket Province, is the biggest dam in the Khong-Chi-Mun project in Thailand. It is close to the Rasi Salai Dam, which has been inoperable for over 10 years because of extreme salinity. Hua Na sits atop the same salt dome as Rasi Salai and may face the same fate if the gates are ever closed. Its height is 17 metres (56 ft), while its length is 207 metres (679 ft). It has 14 gates and a catchment area of 115,000,000 cubic metres (93,000 acre⋅ft). The reservoir stretches for 90 kilometres (56 mi), while its surface area is unknown. The reservoir has a manageable storage capacity of 64.98 million cubic metres.

It exceeded its budget of 1.5 billion baht, costing 2.5 billion.

Opponents note that no Environmental Impact Assessment (EIA) was completed before construction, leaving concerns about flooding and salinity unresolved. Clay resources, which provide a primary occupation for many villagers, would be endangered if the dam gates were closed.
