= Nakhon Kalong =

Coordinates: 15°56′34″N 102°19′38″E

- นครกาหลง (Thai)
- Interactive map of Nakhon Kalong
- Type: Human settlement
- Periods: Pre-history
- Cultures: Dvaravati; Ayutthaya
- Associated with: Mon people; Lao people; Thai people
- Location: Khon Sawan, Chaiyaphum, Thailand

History
- Built: 1st: c. 5th century; 2nd: c. 17th century
- Abandoned: c. 12th century

Site notes
- Material: Brick, Laterite, Sandstone, Ceramics
- Area: 1.61 square kilometres (161 ha)
- Condition: Partly restored
- Owner: Private
- Public access: Yes

Nakhon Kalong (Thai: นครกาหลง) was an ancient moated settlement located in Khon Sawan subdistrict, Khon Sawan, Chaiyaphum, northeastern Thailand. It existed from the 5th to the 12th century. After a half millennium of being abandoned, it was resettled by Siamese from Nakhon Ratchasima around the 17th century.

The site has yet to be officially excavated. Previously, it was one of the tributary states of Dvaravati.

== Layout and location ==
Nakhon Kalong was a rounded circle and double-moated ancient settlement in the present-day Ban Khon Sawan (คอนสวรรค์) in Khon Sawan, Chaiyaphum, Thailand. The inner city, now known as Ban Khon Sawan, was a circle of 1 kilometer in diameter, protected by a moat and an earthen embankment, while the 1.5-kilometers-wide outer city has been transformed into rice fields. The outer moat has been filled up and dismantled, but the furrows remain visible from overhead views.

Several streams flow around the site, eventually leading to the Chi River in the southeast, about 2.5 kilometers away. Because Nakhon Kalong is located near the Sam Mo Pass in the north and is linked to other settlements in the Pa Sak Basin in the central region and Chi-Mun Plain to the east through the Chi River, it has evolved into a trading hub between these regions.

== History ==
Archaeological evidence shows that the site has been inhabited since prehistory. It turned into a complex society around the 5th century during the Dvaravati period, and continued to the Angkorian era, then was abandoned around the 12th century.

It was repopulated in the 17th century by a cousin of the governor of Nakhon Ratchasima, Phraya Khun Han (พระยาขุนหาญ). Stone inscriptions dating from the Dvaravati period has been found throughout the area.

== Findings ==
Nakhon Kalong was a significant Dvaravati settlement during the 8th to 10th centuries. Archaeological evidence has been found numerously in the area, including traces of moats, embankments, earthenware pottery, and, most crucially, Sema stones, which have been found in large numbers and are significant proof of the community's Buddhist affluence. Pottery and human bone fragments dating to the prehistory period were also found.

Five carved red stones standing Buddha images from the Dvaravati period were found on the site, most are in a damaged condition, leaving only the body. Villagers have rebuilt the head and some parts of the body, except for the largest one, about 3 meters high, which is in perfect condition but not yet finished carving. Villagers call this Buddha image “Luang Pho Yai” (หลวงพ่อใหญ่) or “Phra Yai Dvaravati” (พระใหญ่ทวารวดี).

The Sema building contains pieces of pillars, door frames, and other architectural components, indicating an Angkorian influence. Head fragments from Khmer sculptures and brown-glazed hard earthenware pots were also discovered. About 2 kilometers to the northeast, there is a tiny mound with laterite dispersed around.

Important evidence for the Rattanakosin period was the Ubosot or Sim (สิม) of Wat Khon Sawan temple, which dates from around the 19th century.
