= Lam Phra Phloeng Dam =

Dam in Pak Thong Chai, Nakhon Ratchasima, Thailand

- Location within Thailand
- Official name: Lam Phra Phloeng Dam
- Country: Thailand
- Location: Pak Thong Chai, Nakhon Ratchasima
- Coordinates: 14°30′19″N 101°46′50″E
- Construction began: 1967
- Owner: Royal Irrigation Department

Dam and spillways
- Impounds: Lam Phra Phloeng River
- Length: 11 m (36 ft)

Reservoir
- Creates: Lam Phra Phloeng Dam Reservoir
- Total capacity: 1.965 km^{3} (1,593,000 acre⋅ft)

The Lam Phra Phloeng Dam (Thai: เขื่อนลำพระเพลิง, RTGS: Khuean Lam Phra Phloeng, pronounced [kʰɯ̀a̯n lām pʰráʔ pʰlɤ̄ːŋ]), is a dam on the Lam Phra Phloeng River, part of the Mun River catchment, in the Pak Thong Chai District, Nakhon Ratchasima Province, Thailand. Construction of the dam was completed in 1963, and its reservoir has suffered from very high levels of sedimentation resulting from erosion within its catchment area. Its function is mainly irrigation water supply, although it generates electricity as well.

== Siltation ==
The land is tilled after harvesting and has become sensitive to sheet erosion. The area suffers periodically from floods and droughts. Increased erosion since forest clearance has led to the increase of sediment load in rivers draining into the reservoir. As a result, sediment deposition in the dam gradually decreased the water storage capacity from 150 million m^{3} in 1970 to 121 and 108 million m^{3} in 1983 and 1991 respectively. The suspended sediments in the water bodies also affect water quality and cause pollution because of various agrochemicals adsorbed by the sediments into the catchments.

The sedimentation rates decreased gradually from the upstream to the crest of the dam. The high sedimentation rate may be due to the inflow from the tributary as well as eroded materials that come from the upland area to the dam.
