= Living River Siam =

Thai non-governmental organization

Living River Siam (Thai: โครงการแม่น้ำเพื่อชีวิต; formerly South East Asia Rivers Network, or SEARIN) is a Thai non-governmental organization (NGO) which analyzes the impact of Thailand's various dam projects and coordinates the research of indigenous peoples to give Thai villagers the power to document the influence of local rivers and dams. Founded in 1999, it gained prominence during the Pak Mun Dam study period in 2001, when it developed a method for instructing villagers on how to document the effects of the dammed river on their lives. When the Thai government proposed other dam sites, Living River Siam took its research methods to the villages surrounding those sites as well. Today, the organization works with other NGOs in Southeast Asia to counter government-sponsored research that encourages dam construction.

== Pak Mun Dam protests ==
Living River Siam was launched on March 14, 1999, the International Rivers Day of Action, by a group of NGO workers and Thai academics. Its first action, on March 23, was to support an occupation of the Pak Mun Dam site by 5,000 villagers. The Pak Mun Dam, funded partially by the World Bank, was built in 1994 and slowly became the focus of national controversy. It received widespread complaints from Thai villagers and was the focus of the Assembly of the Poor's 99-day, 20,000-person protest in Bangkok in 1997. The dam generates 0.5 percent of Thailand's electric capacity; 40 percent of Thailand's total electric capacity goes unused on an everyday basis.

On June 16, 2001, the Thai government under Thaksin Shinawatra agreed to open the sluice gates of the Pak Mun Dam for four months to allow studies to be conducted on its social impact; this was later extended to 13 months. Coinciding with this agreement, the government announced that official studies would be conducted by Ubon Ratchathani University and a private team contracted by the National Economic and Social Development Board. The university received a budget of 10 million baht (roughly US$280,000), and the government contractors, alleged to be the same group that recommended damming another river, received 94 million baht (roughly US$2,700,000), raising suspicions. Villagers thought that outside academics would not be able to make an objective or accurate study of the river because they were unfamiliar with local fish migration and habitats.

== Thai Baan research ==
In response, Living River Siam developed Ngan Wijai Thai Baan (งานวิจัยไทบ้าน), or "research by Thai villagers". This research is meant to circumvent the traditional approach to anthropological study by allowing villagers to investigate and document, in their own language and on their own terms, every aspect of their life on the river. The only function of the overseeing organization is to compile the villagers' data and publish it for others to read. Living River Siam refers to this in English as "Thai Baan research".

The Mun River research documented the spawning grounds, migration patterns, habitats, and preferred baits of 137 species of fish. Originally, there were 265 species in the river; 220 of these disappeared when the river was dammed, and only 92 reappeared when the sluice gates were opened, meaning that the diversity of the Mun ecosystem had already been severely reduced by the dam. There were 104 species that migrated between the Mekong and Mun rivers, meaning the dam endangered the Mekong's ecosystem as well. Thai villagers took photos of all the fish and counted the number of fish caught before and after the opening of the gates. Over 200 villagers volunteered for the study, and divided themselves up into groups to survey the sub-ecosystems of rapids, channels, eddies, small waterfalls, drinking wells, don islands, bok hin pools, khum pools, wang pools, huu holes, lhum hin stone pockets, kon shallows, kan underwater rapids, and luang fishing grounds.

The use of small and large fish in the local economy was analyzed. Researchers found that while the less common large fish are sold for profit, the diet of Pak Mun villagers consisted mostly of small fish which can be caught in both the wet and dry seasons. Small fish are eaten, sold, and traded with the hill peoples for rice.

The villages documented changes in their towns as a result of the opening of the sluice gates. Fishermen who had been forced to leave for the city returned to their homes, the increase in fish caused a boom in the rural economy, in fishing and tourism. Villagers were able to hold religious ceremonies in important riverside spaces.

=== Government reaction and other responses ===
The results of the Thai Baan research were supported by several academics, including Niti Pawakapan of Chulalongkorn University. The Ubon Ratchathani University study also recommended keeping the sluice gates open for at least five years. However, the Thai government rejected all of the studies for unclear reasons and instead conducted a three-day opinion poll of a random sample of Thais, after which it decided that the gates would stay closed for eight out of twelve months of the year. In 2007, Prime Minister Surayud Chulanont decided to close the gates permanently, citing an alleged secret agreement between thousands of villagers and the Internal Security Operations Command.

The response from non-governmental organizations has been more favorable. The Mekong Wetlands Biodiversity Programme (MWBP), an international alliance managed by the United Nations Development Programme and World Conservation Union, has published a study on the methodology of Thai Baan research and coordinated their own study in Sri Songkham district in 2004, concluding that it was more useful than top-down styles of village research. The study overseen by the MWBP was cited in an academic journal and submitted to an international conference. Living River Siam's spokesperson Pianporn Deetes was invited to a United Nations Environment Programme conference on dams.

In 2002 the Thai government's department of irrigation met the demands of Living River Siam and the Assembly of the Poor with a promise to halt all future dam projects, which was accepted with cautious optimism. To circumvent the issue of domestic damming, in 2007 the Electricity Generating Authority of Thailand (EGAT) announced plans to build a series of dams on Burma's Salween River along its border with Thailand. Living River Siam opposed this plan, citing the threat of environmental destruction in Burma's Shan, Karenni, and Karen states as well as Mae Hong Son Province.

== Additional research ==
Since 2004, Living River Siam has employed its research methods in other threatened locations across rural Thailand.

=== Chiang Khong District ===
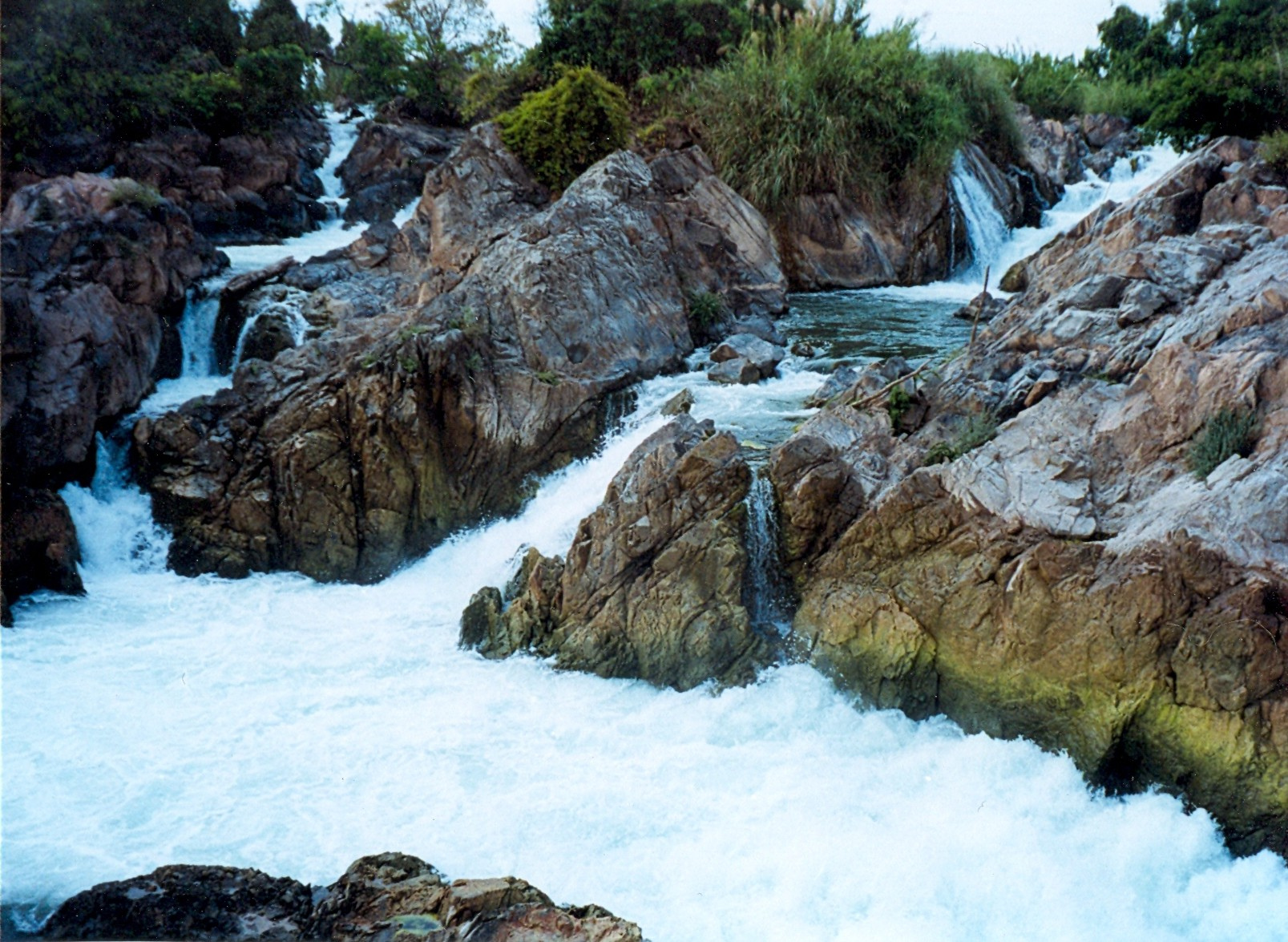
An example of the Mekong's rapids.

The Mekong River remained free of dams until 1993 because of its complex system of rapids which wreck boats, and the unusual monsoon season which reverses the course of some of its branches. In 2004, the Thai government made an agreement with China to open the river to commercial navigation by destroying rapids, which Thai Baan research had identified as important fish spawning grounds. On the Chinese side, dams were constructed. Living River Siam gathered additional Thai Baan surveys from 146 villagers in the Chiang Khong District, which determined that the blasting of rapids had made the river water unsuitable for drinking and bathing, washed away many local riverside gardens, and decimated the populations of local plants and fish. In response to the 2004 studies, the Thai government suspended blasting on one of the rapids, the Khon Pi Luang.

=== Kaeng Sua Ten ===
In 2006, in response to renewed plans for dam construction in Kaeng Sua Ten, Living River Siam released a report on the people of Sa-iap, Amphoe Song, Phrae Province (part of Mae Yom National Park), based on their own experiences and history. It was called Chaobaan research, but the methodology was equivalent to the Thai Baan research. The report examined the ecosystem of the residents of Sa-iap, the vegetables and fungi they subsisted on, medicinal herbs they used, local fauna, wood resources, and their culture.

The report divided Sa-iap history into four periods. Before 1937, the village was self-sustaining and used both farming and gathering for the overwhelming majority of its needs. In 1937, the Thai government allowed private companies to log the forest, destroying part of the villages' infrastructure. In 1957, the villagers entered the employ of the logging companies, causing internal and external conflict as well as increased reliance on unsustainable practices. Finally, in 1991 the villagers formed a conservation group, the Forest Lover Group, which the Chaobaan researchers agreed cut down on conflict. The mood of the villages has returned to one of mutual assistance and traditional customs.

=== Rasi Salai Dam ===
The Rasi Salai Dam was completed in 1994, around the same time as the Pak Mun Dam, and received similar local complaints. The dam's central reservoir was occupied for two years by villagers, until a July 2000 decision opened the sluice gates. From 2003 to 2004, Living River Siam coordinated Thai Baan research in three districts: Amphoe Rasi Salai, Amphoe Rattanaburi, and Amphoe Phon Sai. The report examined village culture, ecology, biodiversity, agriculture, and food and water management. The impact of the closing and opening of the sluice gates was also examined. It was concluded that the dam reduced fish populations, but more importantly, flooded natural salt pits and spread them into rice and vegetable fields, destroying trees and crops. The government has not made a commitment to keep the Rasi Salai Dam decommissioned, but as of 2008 the gates have not yet been closed.

=== Mekong flooding ===
In 2005, and again in 2008, the Mekong River flooded its banks, damaging hundreds of rural villages. Living River Siam joined with other NGOs to form the Thai People's Network for Mekong, which pointed to dams in China as the primary cause of the flooding. An intergovernmental working group called the Mekong River Commission opposed these claims, saying China's dams had little to do with the flood, although they also pressed China for data on the floodwaters. The back-and-forth was covered heavily in Thai press, which gave ample space to the statements of the People's Network.

== Seminars, coordination, and publications ==
The cover of Thai Baan Research at Chiang Khong.

Beginning in 2006, Living River Siam began training other grassroots organizations in Thai Baan research, beginning with the Vietnam Rivers Network and expanding to a Chinese group in 2007. In 2008 they worked with the Burma Rivers Network to conduct research on the Salween River. They also assisted a United Nations-funded NGO, the Mekong Wetlands Biodiversity Programme (MWBP), with running Thai Baan research in 2004. Living River Siam, along with the MWBP, organizes cross-basin coordination between Thai Baan research groups.

Living River Siam has compiled the research and oral accounts of Thai villagers into many publications, which they make available on their website. Its published books document local knowledge about fish, the results of village research, a how-to manual for Thai Baan research, and citizens' guides to defending Thai rivers and communities. They also have produced posters of fish species and dams, pamphlets on fishing gear, and short documentaries about the river.
