= Kaeng Suea Ten Dam =

- Location within Thailand
- Country: Thailand
- Location: Song, Phrae
- Coordinates: 18°36′0″N 100°9′0″E
- Purpose: Flood control, irrigation
- Status: Proposed
- Owner: Royal Irrigation Department

Dam and spillways
- Type of dam: Embankment, earth-fill clay-core
- Impounds: Yom River

Kaeng Suea Ten Dam (Thai: เขื่อนแก่งเสือเต้น, RTGS: Khuean Kaeng Suea Ten, pronounced [kʰɯ̀an kɛ̀ŋ sɯ̌a tên]) was a dam proposed for a site in the Phi Pan Nam Range, in Song District, Phrae Province, Thailand. It is near Mae Yom National Park, in a rural area of the Thai highlands.

== Projected dam ==
The dam was planned on the Yom River in Kaeng Suea Ten in 1991, but the project was abandoned. The dam, if built, would have destroyed large areas of forest, where many of the tree species are valuable teak trees. The plans were renewed in 2006, drawing protest from the Assembly of the Poor and Living River Siam. Debate about the dam was opened again in 2011. The dam project has not been implemented due to the strong resistance of environmental groups and the villagers around the Mae Yom River.
