= Sirindhorn district =

Sirindhorn สิรินธร
- District
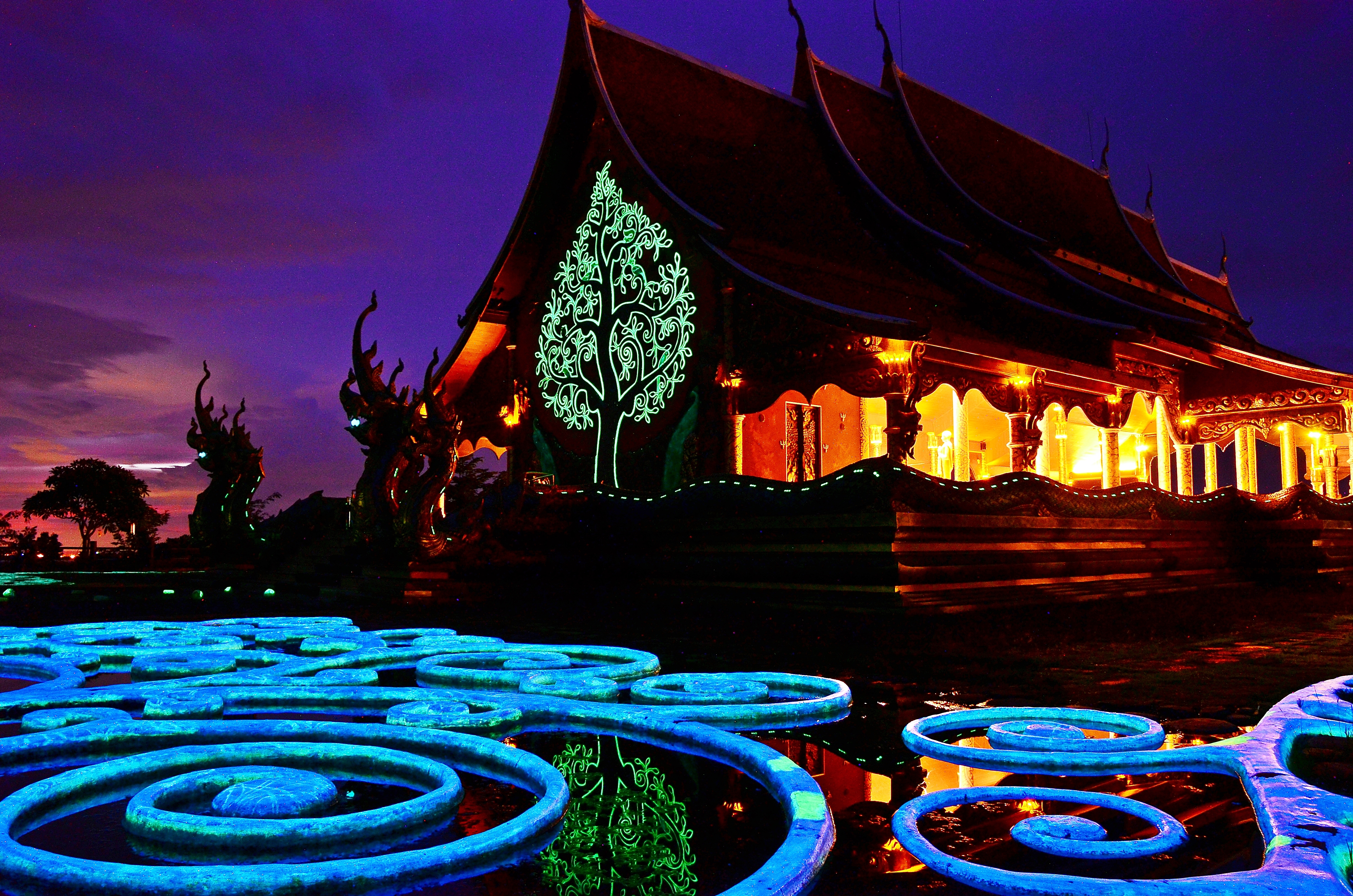
- Wat Sirindhorn Wararam Phu Phrao

- District location in Ubon Ratchathani province
- Coordinates: 15°12′6″N 105°23′54″E
- Country: Thailand
- Province: Ubon Ratchathani
- Seat: Nikhom Sang Ton-eng Lam Dom Noi
- Subdistricts: 6
- Mubans: 76
- District established: 1992

Area
  - Total: 370.0 km^{2} (142.9 sq mi)

Population (2015)
  - Total: 52,981
  - Density: 130.2/km^{2} (337/sq mi)
- Time zone: UTC+7 (ICT)
- Postal code: 34350
- Geocode: 3425

Sirindhorn (Thai: สิรินธร; RTGS: Sirinthon) is a district (amphoe) of Ubon Ratchathani province, Thailand, established by the Royal Decree Establishing Amphoe Sirindhorn, BE 2534 (1991), coming into force on 4 January 1992. It was named in the honour of Princess Sirindhorn on the occasion of her 36th birthday.

== Creation ==
The district was created effective 3 January 1992 by splitting off tambon Kham Khuean Kaeo from Khong Chiam and the five tambons, Khan Rai, Chong Mek, Nikhom Sang Ton-eng Lam Dom Noi, Non Ko, and Fang Kham, from Phibun Mangsahan.

== Geography ==
Neighboring districts are (from the south clockwise): Buntharik, Phibun Mangsahan and Khong Chiam. To the west across the Mekong river is the Lao province of Champasak.

The Sirindhorn Dam that dams the Dom Noi River is in this district. There is a border crossing to Laos here—from Chong Mek on the Thai side to Vang Tao on the Lao side, with onward travel typically to Pakxe.

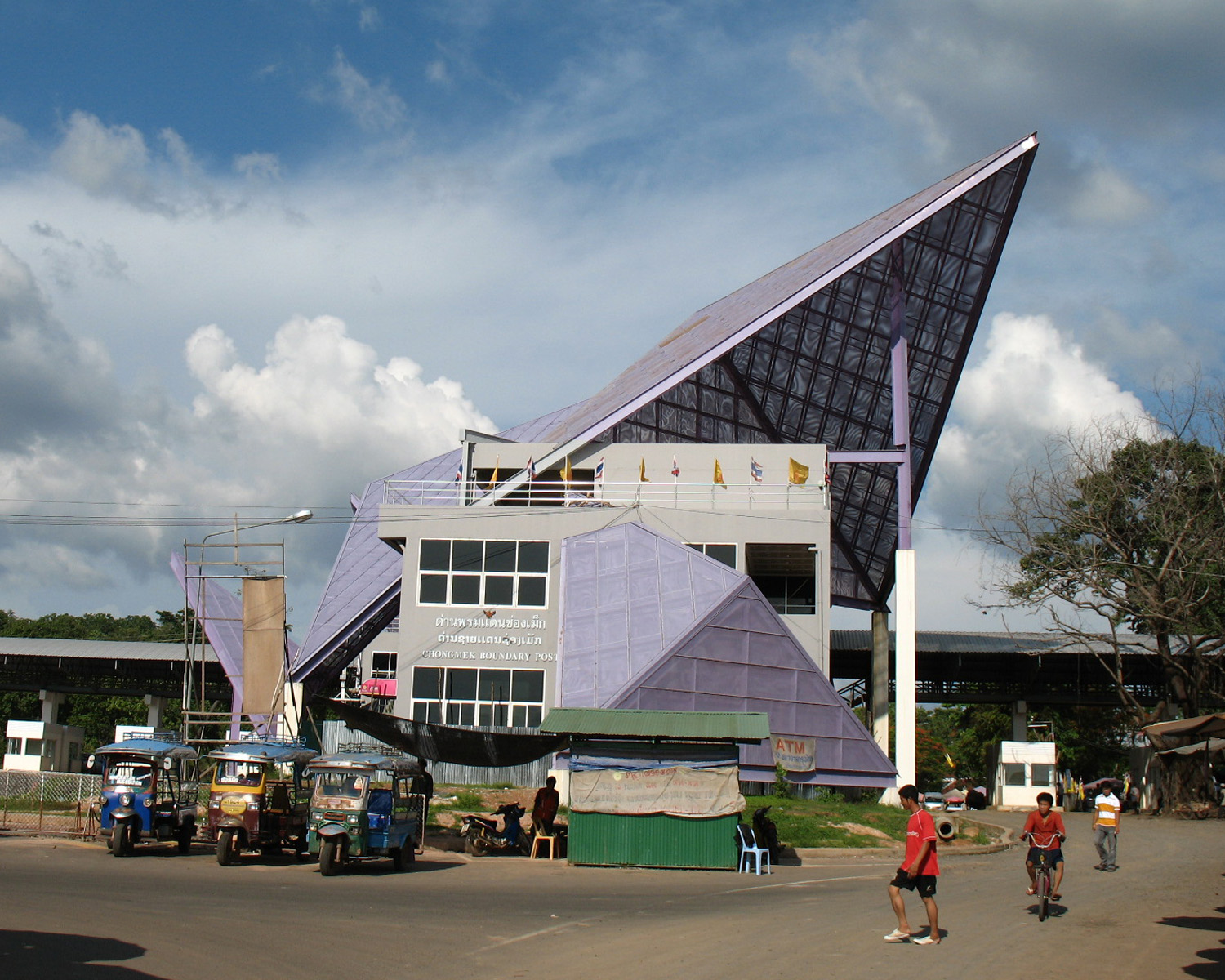
Chong Mek Border Post, then under construction in 2007

== Administration ==
=== Central administration ===
The district is divided into six subdistricts (tambons), which are further subdivided into 76 administrative villages (mubans).

No.	Name	Thai	Villages	Pop.
1.	Khan Rai	คันไร่	16	11,483
2.	Chong Mek	ช่องเม็ก	13	9,301
3.	Non Ko	โนนก่อ	14	10,613
4.	Nikhom Sang Ton-eng Lam Dom Noi	นิคมสร้างตนเองลำโดมน้อย	13	7,538
5.	Fang Kham	ฝางคำ	4	3,588
6.	Kham Khuean Kaeo	คำเขื่อนแก้ว	16	10,458

=== Local administration ===
There are two subdistrict municipalities (thesaban tambons) in the district:

- Chong Mek (Thai: เทศบาลตำบลช่องเม็ก) consisting of parts of subdistrict Chong Mek.
- Nikhom Sang Ton-eng Lam Dom Noi (Thai: เทศบาลตำบลนิคมสร้างตนเองลำโดมน้อย) consisting of subdistrict Nikhom Sang Ton-eng Lam Dom Noi.

There are five subdistrict administrative organizations (SAO) in the district:

- Khan Rai (Thai: องค์การบริหารส่วนตำบลคันไร่) consisting of subdistrict Khan Rai.
- Chong Mek (Thai: องค์การบริหารส่วนตำบลช่องเม็ก) consisting of parts of subdistrict Chong Mek.
- Non Ko (Thai: องค์การบริหารส่วนตำบลโนนก่อ) consisting of subdistrict Non Ko.
- Fang Kham (Thai: องค์การบริหารส่วนตำบลฝางคำ) consisting of subdistrict Fang Kham.
- Kham Khuean Kaeo (Thai: องค์การบริหารส่วนตำบลคำเขื่อนแก้ว) consisting of subdistrict Kham Khuean Kaeo.
