= Chong Mek =

Chong Mek ช่องเม็ก
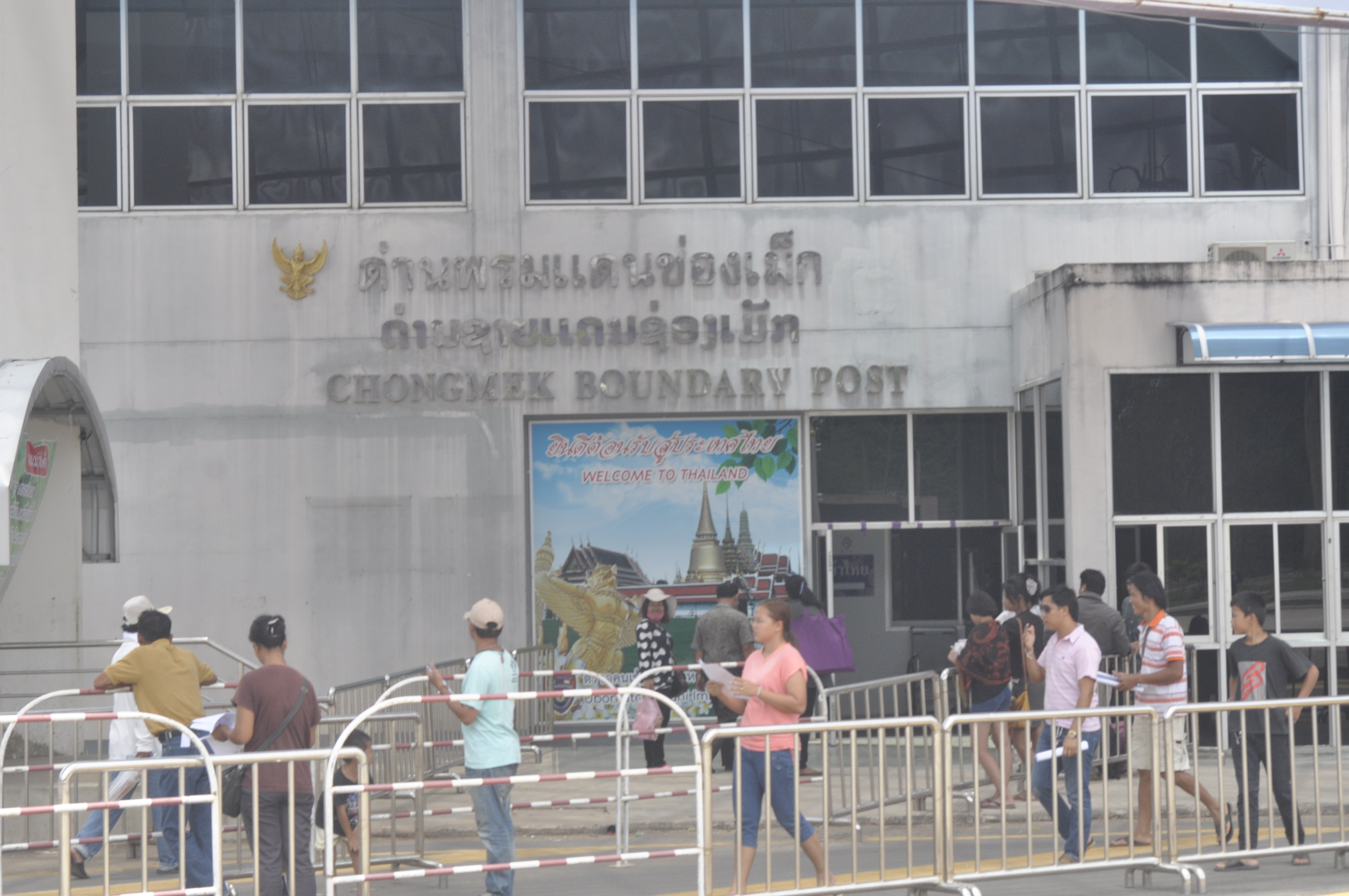
- Thai border post at Chong Mek

- Location in Thailand
- Coordinates: 15°7′59″N 105°28′1″E
- Country: Thailand
- Province: Ubon Ratchathani Province
- District: Amphoe Sirindhorn
- Postal code: 34350
- Area code: 45

Chong Mek (Thai: ช่องเม็ก) is a border town in the Isan region of Thailand. It is located in the Sirindhorn District of Ubon Ratchathani Province, about 90 kilometres (60 mi) east of Ubon Ratchathani. The town is the only land-based crossing open to most travellers from Thailand to Laos, the other such crossings being across the Mekong river. Vang Tao is the settlement on the Lao side.

The town has a busy market popular with Thai visitors, however its popularity has diminished since the opening of the bridge at Mukdahan in 2007.

== Sights and attractions ==
About 5 km (3 mi) west of Chong Mek is the large Sirindhorn Reservoir created by the construction of the Sirindhorn Dam in 1971.
