= Mueang Ham Hok =

Coordinates: 15°43′22″N 101°56′47″E

- เมืองหามหอก (Thai)
- Interactive map of Mueang Ham Hok
- Type: Human settlement
- Periods: Post-classical history
- Cultures: Dvaravati; Khmer; Lan Xang
- Associated with: Mon people; Lao people; Thai people
- Location: Ban Khwao, Chaiyaphum, Thailand

History
- Built: c. 6th century
- Abandoned: c. 17th century

Site notes
- Material: Brick, Laterite, Sandstone, Ceramics
- Area: 2.29 square kilometres (229 ha)
- Condition: Mostly destroyed
- Owner: Private
- Public access: Yes

Mueang Ham Hok (Thai: เมืองหามหอก) was a large, well-defined double-moated former settlement in Ban Khwao subdistrict, Ban Khwao, Chaiyaphum, northeastern Thailand. It was inhabited from the 6th – 17th centuries from the Dvaravati to the mid-Ayutthaya periods.

The city was abandoned around the 17th century, due to the wars between Ayutthaya and Nakhon Ratchasima during the reign of King Narai. The people were then evacuated northeastward to settled in Ban Khi Lek Yai (บ้านขี้เหล็กใหญ่), near the present-day Mueang Chaiyaphum.

The social and political structure of Mueang Ham Hok remains unclear, as no inscriptions have been found in the area and there is no mention of it in other historical documents. Mueang Ham Hok was listed as a historical site by the Fine Arts Department in 1936.

== Etymology ==
The origin of name Ham Hok comes from the local legend that says, in the past, the city lord was a very brave and invincible person. Every time he traveled, he would have his followers weave a spear into a stretcher and he then sit on it or on the tip of the spear and have his followers carry it. People, therefore, called this city Mueang Ham Hok which means "city of carrying spears". Locals believe Mueang Ham Hok is an old Chaiyaphum.

== Layout and location ==
The site is located in the Khlong Raeng watershed (คลองแร้ง), south of Ban Khwao subdistrict, Ban Khwao, Chaiyaphum, northeastern Thailand. The inner city is a reasonably spherical mound, approximately 1 kilometer in diameter, raised about 3 meters above the surrounding ground level, and surrounded by a moat and embankment. The outer city is a relatively open lowland area, bounded by another moat and embankment. The Chi River flows in the south, about 5 kilometers away. Small streams that flow near the city include Huai Pong (ห้วยโป่ง), Nong O (หนองอ้อ), Khlong Phai Ngam (คลองไผ่งาม), and Huai Yang Chum (ห้วยยางชุม).

To the current condition, the site's outer moat and embankment still form a continuous line around the area. The embankment is densely covered with trees and plants. The embankment is approximately 10 meters wide and 6–7 meters high. The overall height is not uniform. The moat is located on the outside of the embankment, approximately 10 meters wide. The inner city's moat and embankment are not as clear as the outer one, but it can still be observed, especially in the southern part. The moat is approximately 10 meters wide and the embankment is approximately 6 meters wide. The embankment is very low. It can be seen that the height is at the same level as the surrounding area.

According to locals, the moated Mueang Ham Hok was previously enclosed by a 12-kilometer-long rectangular city wall.

== Findings ==
Archaeological surveys and excavations in 1988 found evidence of artifacts indicating that the area was settling since the pre-history era. It then evolved into the complex community around the 6th century during the Dvaravati period, continued to the ancient Angkorian between the 10th - 12th century, and the Thai-Lao culture period in the 13th until it was abandoned in around the 17th century. The information can be summarized as follows:

- Dvaravati period (6th–11th century): Notable evidence found, includes numerous pottery pieces; some decorated with rope patterns, red outer glaze, and black polished pottery, pottery bullets, pottery spouts, pottery rings, pieces of fired pottery, and pieces of iron tools and utensils that were damaged and broken. The shape of the iron tools found was long and pointed at the end. One piece looked like a knife. Sandstone pillars, which are believed to be Bai sema, were also found.
- Angkorian period (10th–12th century): Small number of artifacts were discovered, including ordinary pottery fragments (some decorated with rope patterns and some not), fired pottery fragments, bases for religious figures made of sandstone, and hard pottery fragments, mostly with greenish-brown glazes, green glazes, and white glazes, which were found to have been produced and used extensively in the ancient Khmer culture.
- Tai domination period (12th–17th century): Religious buildings were found but now only bricks remain.
