= Seriprachathippatai 2497 Bridge =

The Democracy Bridge 1954 Bridge Over The Mun River
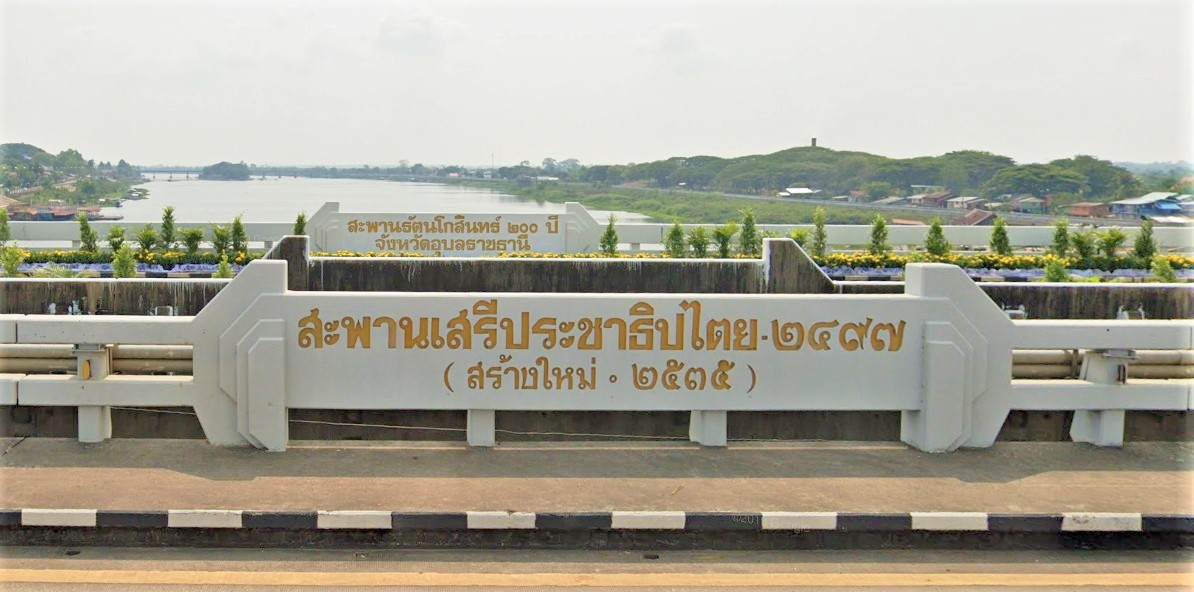
- Currently bridge nameplate
- Coordinates: 15.2227°N 104.8573°E
- Carries: 4 lanes of National Highway 204 (2 inbound lanes, 2 outbound lanes), 4 pedestrians (all this including the Rattanakosin 200 Years Bridge)
- Crosses: Mun River
- Locale: Warin Chamrap Town-Municipality, Warin Chamrap District and Ubon Ratchathani, Mueang Ubon Ratchathani District, Ubon Ratchathani Province
- Official name: Seriprachathippatai 2497 Bridge
- Other name(s): Seriprachathippatai Bridge; Bridge Over The Mun River; Bridge Over The Mun River Ubon Ratchathani

Characteristics
- Total length: 450 m (1,476.4 ft)
- Width: 9 m (29.5 ft)
- Piers in water: 19

History
- Engineering design by: Prasit Suthatkul
- Construction start: 1953
- Construction end: 1954
- Opened: June 24, 1954; 70 years ago (assumed)

The Democracy Bridge 1954 or Seriprachathippatai 2497 Bridge (Thai: สะพานเสรีประชาธิปไตย 2497, abbreviated as Seriprachathippatai Bridge) is a bridge across the Mun River in Ubon Ratchathani Province, northeast Thailand.

== History ==
Seriprachathippatai Bridge is the first bridge that across Mun River of Ubon Ratchathani connecting between Warin Chamrap Town-Municipality in Warin Chamrap District and Ubon Ratchathani in Mueang Ubon Ratchathani District, a province capital, which is 2 km (1.2 mi) away.

The construction began in 1953, the cost was eight million baht from the national budget by the Municipal Public Works Department (now Department of Public Works and Town & Country Planning) was a design agency and supervising the construction.

The bridge was 9 m (29.5 ft) wide and 450 m (1,476.4 ft) long, supervised by Prasit Suthatkul, and contracted by Kamjorn Construction Company. Construction was completed in 1954 with no welded steel frames with only three piers. It was the longest bridge in Thailand at that time.

The naming of the bridge was in accordance with government guidelines at the time (Phibul government), with anti-communist policies. Hence the name "Seriprachathippatai", which means "liberal democracy" and 1954, the year the bridge was opened (corresponds to 2497 according to the Buddhist calendar).

The bridge was rebuilt in 1992 on the original site due to deterioration over time, coincides with the year that Ubon Ratchathani marks the 200th anniversary.

It is now regarded as a bridge spanning the Mun River of Ubon Ratchathani paired with adjacent the Rattanakosin 200 Years Bridge, that built on the occasion of the 200th anniversary of Rattanakosin Kingdom (Bangkok) in 1982.
