= Rasi Salai Dam =

Sisaket Province dam

Coordinates: 15.3438°N 104.0987°E

- Interactive map of Rasi Salai Dam
- Country: Thailand
- Status: Operational
- Opening date: 1994

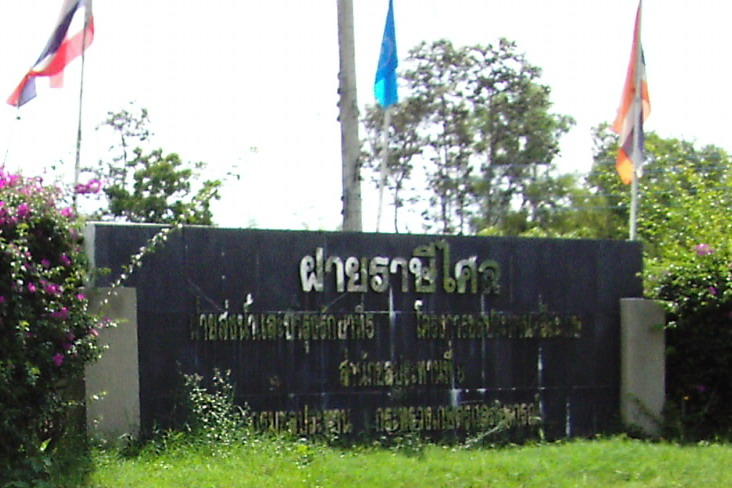

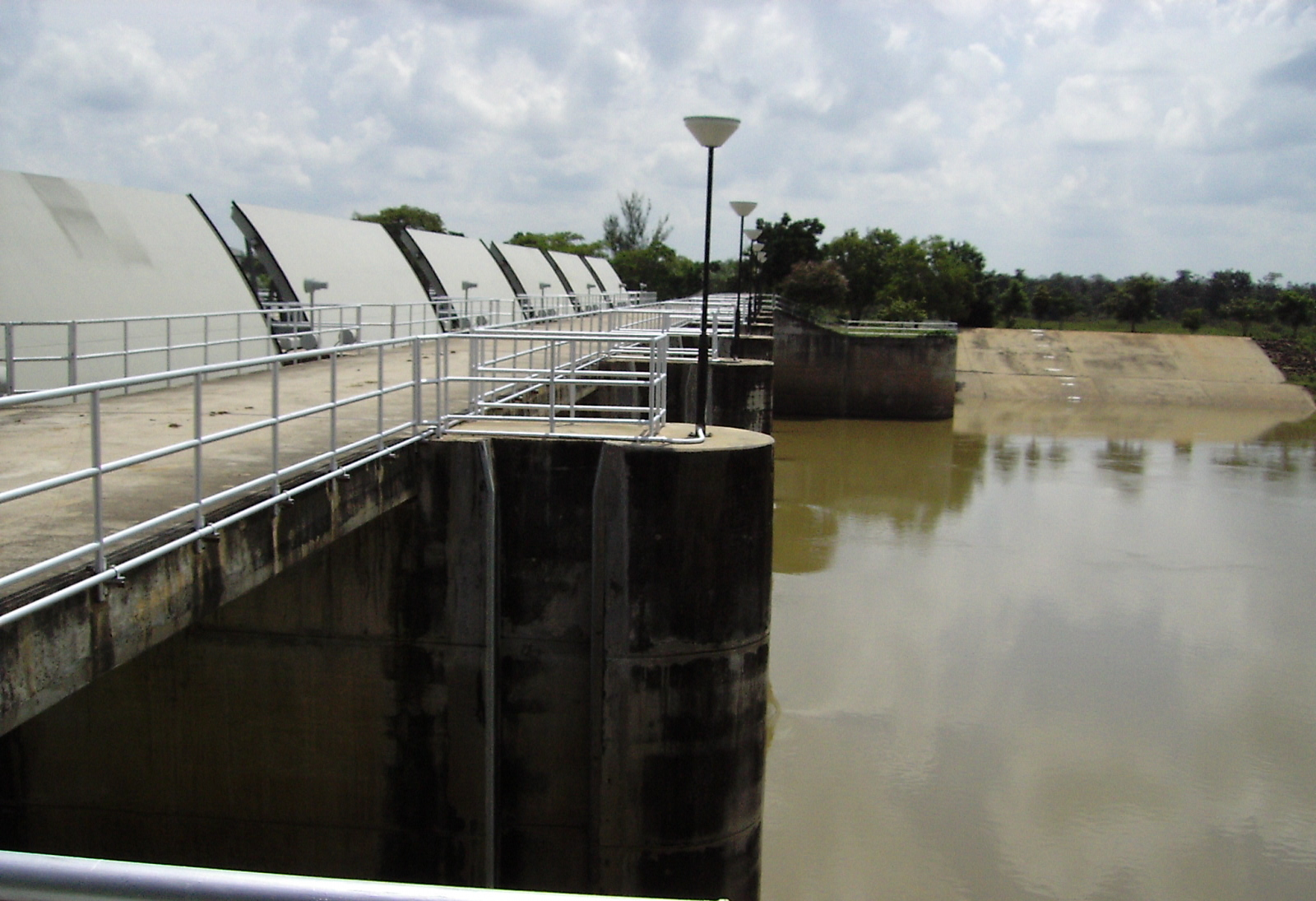

The Rasi Salai Dam (Thai: เขื่อนราษีไศล, RTGS: Khuean Rasi Salai, pronounced [kʰɯ̀a̯n rāː.sǐː sā.lǎj]) is a dam in Rasi Salai District, Sisaket Province, Thailand, constructed in 1992. It was constructed by the Electricity Generating Authority of Thailand (EGAT) with assistance from the World Bank (As of 2020 the dam does not appear on EGAT's website.) The 17 m high dam was projected to cost 140 million baht. Its final cost was 871 million baht, not including compensation payments to affected residents.

== Background ==
The Rasi Salai Dam was constructed by the Department of Energy Development and Promotion (DEDP) as part of the Khong-Chee-Mun Water Diversion Project. The project envisioned the building of 13 dams on the Chi and Mun Rivers over 42 years. It was thought that the diversion of water from the Mekong into the two rivers would end water shortages in northeastern Thailand. The entire diversion project was estimated to cost 228 billion baht.

Villagers claim that DEDP did not release any information to the public before or during the dam's construction. DEDP claimed it was building a 4.5-metre rubber weir that would not raise water levels above the riverbank. In reality, the state agency was building a nine-metre concrete dam. No environmental assessment was ever conducted given that the DEDP claimed it was a small-scale project.

Living River Siam, a Thai NGO, helped villagers document the effects of the dam on their lives. EGAT promised that the dam's waters would be used to irrigate local fields, but the dam flooded the ancient salt dome on which it was constructed. The result was non-potable brackish water that made nearby fields toxic to cultivation. Angry villagers occupied the dam site for two years and petitioned the government to close it down. The dam's gates were opened in 2000 pending a permanent resolution of the issue. The water management system decided upon involves opening the dam's gates for four months every year, June to September.

== Compensation ==
After on-going demonstrations by villagers, in 2000 the DEDP paid compensation to private property owners only. Those who toiled on common land were not compensated. As a result of 18 demonstrations against the Rasi Salai Dam, the Chavalit government paid compensation to 1,154 of the 3,000 affected families. Squabbles over compensation divided families and communities.

In April 2019, almost 30 years after the dam's construction, the Royal Irrigation Department (RID), which took over the project from the Energy Ministry in 2002, agreed to make a final compensation payment of 600 million baht. RID will pay 32,000 baht per rai over the next two years to those impacted by the dam. From 1997 to 2017, up to 1.927 billion baht has been paid in compensation to farmers for 60,000 rai (9,600 hectares) of affected land. This final package will cover a remaining 8,469 rai (1,355 hectares) of land affected by the dam.
