= Assembly of the Poor =

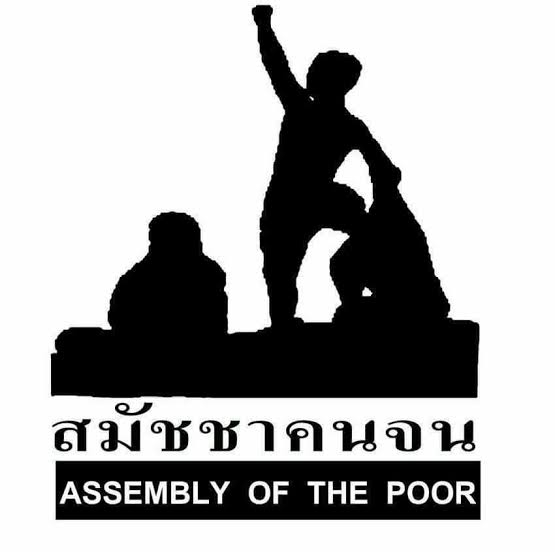
Logo of The Assembly of the Poor

The Assembly of the Poor (Thai: สมัชชาคนจน) (AOP) is a non-governmental organization (NGO) in Thailand. Its aim is to help those affected by development projects and industries to become involved in the process of development, so that they benefit from those projects.

The Assembly of the Poor is intended to be a political voice for villagers and marginalized members of society. As an organization, it is allied with other NGOs in Thailand. When the Assembly of the Poor first began, it was accused of dismantling Thailand's unity and the democratic principles of Thai ideologies. The non-governmental organization is an amalgamation of seven districts representing every region of Thailand. It is composed of urban and rural small-scale agriculturists and manual labourers. Due to its variety of members, the Assembly is able to transcend regional and class divisions.

== Background ==
In the 1950s, Thailand underwent a plan of development, supported by the World Bank, intended to help the country industrialize. Subsequent foreign investment in the company's economy assisted it towards meeting its goals, but while it would by the 1990s be considered a leader among developing nations along with other Southeast Asian countries, development was uneven through the country, with unequal distribution of wealth and technology. The agricultural community, which had sacrificed natural resources and contributed significant capital to the development of infrastructure saw few gains for themselves.

== Formation ==
The Assembly of the Poor grew out of this unrest, beginning with villagers angry about the local impact of the Pak Mun Dam. One of the co-founders of the group, Vanida Tantiwittayapitak had become involved in Pak Mun after her relocation to the country following the Thammasat University massacre. While it started as a rural assembly, city workers were also welcomed.

The grassroots organization became official on international Human Rights Day, 10 December 1995, becoming the first rural political voice after the 1975 suppression of the Peasants' Federation. This took place on the opening day of their first conference, "Assembly of the Poor: The consequences of Large-Scale Development Projects", held at Thammasat University and intended to coincide with the ASEAN Summit scheduled in Bangkok on 14–15 December.

Conference attendees spent several days developing the "Mun River Declaration", which both announced their existence and criticized the prioritization of industrial development at the expense of local communities. It also fired a warning shot across the bow of government, forming a petition detailing their grievances to the government, punctuated by a march through Bangkok of hundreds of AOP members and sympathizers.

== Goals ==
The Assembly of the Poor's first strategy connected the issues suffered by local communities to national policy. Their second was to create a sense of shared identity among those who identified themselves as suffering from developmental policies or being excluded from developmental benefits. AOP demands compensation for those injured by developmental strategies and access to resources by their own communities, but does not limit its political activities to self-interest.

== Challenges ==
According to the Bangkok Post the recent issues in Thailand have a lot to do with the political actors trying to undermine the AOP. The lack of unity among the poor poses a major obstacle in the battle for a more democratic society. In the 21st century, political divisions in Thailand have weakened the movement. In order for the NGO to continue in a positive direction the Bangkok Post stated they must focus on:

1. Natural resources
2. Protection of local people's rights to manage those resources
3. The movement of certain issues to the forefront of their political voice.
4. Community rights
5. An aggressive tax rate on land holdings
6. Establishment of a land development fund
7. Fair land distribution
