= Electricity Generating Authority of Thailand =

State enterprise and electric utility

Electricity Generating Authority of Thailand (EGAT)
- Native name: การไฟฟ้าฝ่ายผลิตแห่งประเทศไทย
- Type: State enterprise
- Industry: Electric power; coal mining
- Predecessor: Yanhee Electricity Authority; Lignite Authority; North-East Electricity Authority
- Founded: 1 May 1969; 57 years ago
- Headquarters: Bangkok, Thailand
- Key people: Thepparat Theppitak (Governor)
- Products: Electric power generation and transmission; lignite
- Revenue: ▼719,648 million baht (2024)
- Net income: ▲49,611 million baht (2024)
- Total assets: ▲1,357,645 million baht (2024)
- Number of employees: 14,869 (December 2024)
- Website: Official website

The Electricity Generating Authority of Thailand (EGAT) (Thai: การไฟฟ้าฝ่ายผลิตแห่งประเทศไทย; RTGS: kan fai fa fai phalit haeng prathet thai) is a state enterprise, managed by the Ministry of Energy, responsible for electric power generation and transmission as well as bulk electric energy sales in Thailand. EGAT, established on 1 May 1969, is the largest power producer in Thailand, owning and operating power plants at 45 sites across the country with a total installed capacity of 15,548 MW.

EGAT's monopoly position in Thailand's electrical energy market has been challenged by critics as influential as a former energy minister and other government members are on the board. It has been criticised as inefficient and an impediment to the development of renewable energy sources.

== Mission ==
As stated in EGAT's Annual Report 2017:

- To generate, acquire, supply or sell electricity
- To conduct electricity-related businesses and other businesses related to EGAT's activities including production and sale of lignite according to the EGAT Act B.E. 2511 (1968) (Amended in B.E. 2535) (1992)

== Operations ==
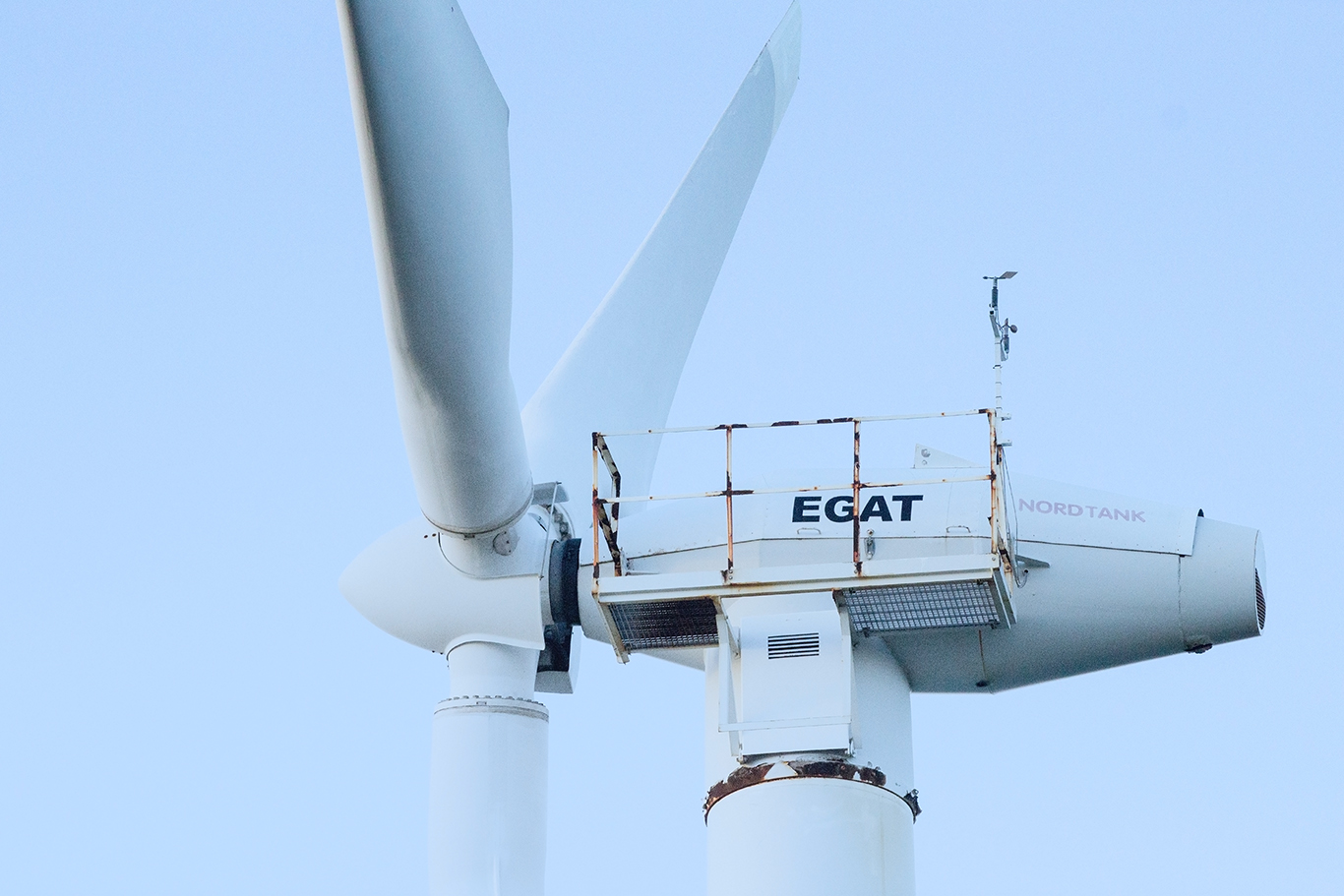
EGAT wind turbine, Phuket

EGAT's power generation plants consist of three thermal power plants, six combined cycle power plants, 24 hydropower plants, eight renewable energy plants, and four diesel power plants. As of 31 May 2018 EGAT produced 37 percent of Thailand's electricity; independent power producers, 35 percent; small power producers, 19 percent; and electricity imports, 9 percent. Gas-fired generation powers 67 percent of EGAT's electricity generation while coal-fired power plants account for 20 percent. Most of EGAT's electricity is sold to the Metropolitan Electricity Authority (MEA), which supplies the Bangkok region, and the Provincial Electricity Authority (PEA), which supplies the rest of Thailand.

EGAT operates the Mae Moh coal (lignite) mine in Lampang Province and is required by its enabling legislation to sell lignite.

Observers have noted that in some Western countries, the state purchases renewable energy from producers first before purchasing non-renewable energy. If renewables fail to meet the country's energy demand, it is topped up using non-renewable energy sources. In Thailand, this policy is reversed.

EGAT's net profits have declined 3.5 to 4 percent per year for the last several years, in concert with its share of power generation dipping to 36 percent in 2017 from 55 percent over a decade ago. Independent power producers (IPP) ramped up production over the last four years, from a few hundred megawatts to nearly 3,000 MW at the end of 2017. As IPP-supplied power purchases increase, EGAT's profits decline.

As of May 2016, EGAT employed 22,955 persons. To shore up declining profits, EGAT intends to reduce its staff to 15,000 by 2021, the first staff cuts in its 49-year history.

=== Financials ===
EGAT reported revenues of 719,648 million baht in fiscal year 2024 (FY2024: 1 January–31 December 2024). Net income was 49,611 million baht and total assets grew to 1,357,645 million baht.

== Fossil fuel consumption ==
In the first half of 2016, Thailand imported 11.13 million tonnes of coal, up 3.5 percent from 10.76 million metric tonnes (mt) in the first half of 2015. Indonesia and Australia supplied 5.6 million tonnes of bituminous coal and 5.5 million tonnes of "other" coal. China and Russia supplied 47,395 tonnes of anthracite coal. Thailand produced 6.88 million mt of lignite from January–May 2016, rising 7.5 percent from the same period in 2015. EGAT accounts for "...most of the country's domestic lignite production, which is mainly supplied to its own power plants." Coal-fired power plants consumed 10.31 million mt of coal and lignite from January to May 2016, or 60.9 percent of the total, rising 11.4 percent year on year.

In 2017, Thailand imported 22.18 million mt of coal, up 2.5 percent from 2016. The nation produced 16.26 million mt of lignite in 2017, down 4.2 percent year on year. The country consumed a total of 39.07 million mt of coal and lignite, up 0.9 percent. Coal-fired power plants consumed 23.73 million mt of the total, down 4.2 percent from 2016. Other industries consumed the remainder.

While EGAT pushes forward with plans for coal-fired generating plants, many countries are spurning coal or deferring its use:

- China in 2016 announced the suspension of plans for 100 new coal plants, including plants under construction.
- India's Electricity Central Electricity Authority has said that after coal-fired power plants under construction are completed, the country will need no new ones until 2027.

== Attempted privatisation ==
Beginning in 2003, Prime Minister Thaksin Shinawatra repeatedly attempted to privatise EGAT. One of the goals of the privatisation was to raise 42 billion baht from the IPO and use the funds to invest in three new natural-gas powered power plants.

In early 2004 massive employee protests of nearly 500,000 people forced the EGAT governor to resign, thus delaying the planned privatisation of the state enterprise. Governor Kraisri Karnasuta worked with employees to address their concerns about the privatisation, and by December 2004, it was claimed that approximately 80% of employees supported privatisation. Permanent protest stages and tents at the EGAT headquarters were taken down as the state enterprise returned to normal. After the Mahachon Party (one of the few parties officially against privatisation of state enterprises) won only two seats in the February 2005 parliamentary elections, the process of EGAT's privatisation was restarted. The agency was corporatized in June 2005, transforming it from the Electricity Generating Authority of Thailand to EGAT PLC. However, EGAT's privatisation was abruptly delayed when some NGOs and some union members filed a petition with the Supreme Court a few days before the scheduled listing on the Stock Exchange of Thailand (SET).

On 23 March 2006, the Supreme Administrative Court ruled against the privatisation of EGAT PLC, citing conflicts of interest, public hearing irregularities, and the continued right of expropriation. The court said that Olarn Chaipravat, a board member of PTT and Shin Corporation (both business partners of EGAT), was on a committee involved in the legal preparation of Egat's privatisation. The court questioned the neutrality of Parinya Nutalai, chair of the public hearing panel on the EGAT listing, because he was Vice Minister of Natural Resources and the Environment.

It also ruled that insufficient opportunities were given to EGAT employees to make themselves heard. There was only one public hearing for employees, which only 1,057 attended. Lastly, EGAT PLC continued to have the right to expropriate public land to build power plants and transmission lines, a right reserved for the state. Two decrees were nullified: one ordering the dissolution of the status of EGAT as a state enterprise, and the other serving as a new charter for EGAT PLC.

Union leaders and anti-Thaksin protesters cheered the ruling, and called for the denationalisation of other privatised state enterprises, such as PTT Exploration and Production (PTTEP) and Thai Airways International (both privatized in 1992), PTT PCL, TOT PCL, MCOT PCL, Thailand Post Co Ltd, and CAT Telecom PCL. Like EGAT, PTT also retained land expropriation rights after it was privatised. However, this was one of the grounds for the nullification of the EGAT privatisation. Caretaker Finance Minister Thanong Bidaya has noted that the delisting and denationalisation of PTT could force the government to borrow massively from foreign institutions.

Some criticised that the listing of PTT on the SET on the grounds that it represented a massive transfer of public assets for the benefit of few people. Though the government initially accepted over 100,000 first-time investors, there were reports that the majority of the shares for sale to retail investors had been reserved for politicians, the banks' preferred clients, and journalists, leaving many retail investors, who stood in long lines to wait, to return home empty-handed. A nephew of Suriya Juengrungruangkit, the minister of Industry overseeing PTT and TRT Party secretary general, for example, was reported to have acquired 22 times the maximum number of PTT shares distributed to retail investors.

Fears of this being repeated were often cited as the reason why EGAT's privatisation was delayed indefinitely. Another key argument for delaying privatisation was that privatisation preceded the establishment of an independent energy regulatory authority. In international experience, there are no examples of successful monopoly utility privatisation without regulatory oversight. Under pressure, Thaksin's government formed an interim electricity regulatory body, but some charged that it lacked authority to force compliance, levy fines, or punish defaulters. EGAT employee concerns about employment security were also common. Some expressed concern that partial ownership of Thailand's largest electricity producer by foreign shareholders would impact national security and cause conflicts of interest.

Anti-privatisation petitioners (including the Confederation of Consumer Organisations, People Living with HIV/Aids, Alternative Energy Project for Sustainability, Free Trade Area Watch, and the Four Region Slum Network) were harshly criticised by both Thai and international investors, who accused them of using corrupt tactics in delaying the listing. They also pointed to the public mandate of the 2005 election, during which the only anti-privatisation party suffered a near complete loss. International power sector governance experts from Harvard University, University of Delaware, and the World Resources Institute lauded the successful repeal of EGAT privatisation as an important step towards increased accountability and transparency in the Thai energy industry.

== Thailand Power Development Plan 2015-2036 (PDP2025) ==
Guiding EGAT's efforts is Thailand's Power Development Plan (PDP). The plan, prepared by the Ministry of Energy (MOE) and EGAT, is issued iteratively. The previous edition, PDP2010 Revision 3, covered the years 2012-2030.

Along with the PDP, the MOE produces several subsidiary plans that roll up into the PDP:

- Energy Efficiency Development Plan (EEDP)
- Alternative Energy Development Plan (AEDP)
- Natural Gas Supply Plan
- Petroleum Management Plan

PDP2015 begins with the assumptions that:

- Thailand's average GDP growth over the period 2014-2036 will be 3.94 percent annually
- Thailand's population growth over the same period will average 0.03 percent annually
- Energy savings over the period as forecasted in the EEDP will total 89,672 GWh
- Renewables, including domestic hydro, will supply 19,634.4 MW of power over the period
- Thailand's new power demands will grow 2.67 percent annually, 2014-2036
- In 2036 Thailand's peak electricity demand will be 49,655 MW and that total electricity demand will be 326,119 GWh

PDP2015 projects the following changes in Thailand electrical power generation fuel mix over the period 2014-2036:

- Imported hydro-power: Rising from 7 percent in 2014 to 15-20 percent in 2036
- Coal/lignite: Flat to rising from 20 percent to 20-25 percent. EGAT appears to be insistent on building coal-fired plants regardless of the changing economics of power generation.
- Renewables, including domestic hydro: Rising from 8 percent to 15-20 percent
- Natural gas: Declining from 64 percent to 30-40 percent
- Nuclear: Rising from 0 percent to 0-5 percent
- Diesel/fuel oil: Declining from 1 percent to zero

PDP2015 projects that Thailand's CO_{2} emissions from power generation will rise from 86,998,000 tons in 2015 to 104,075,000 tons in 2036.

Thailand's newest power development plan, PDP2018, is expected to be issued in September 2018.

== Demand Side Management (DSM) program ==
On December 3, 1991, The Cabinet of the Royal Thai Government passed a resolution approving the establishment of the Demand Side Management Program (DSM) as a new department of EGAT. DSM's mission is to promote the efficient use of electricity in Thailand. The first DSM program made its official debut on September 20, 1993 under the slogan "Together in Conservation". Since then, EGAT has introduced the Energy Label No. 5 Project to the Thai people to promote energy efficient appliance utilization. The year 2017 marked 24 years since demand side management was implemented and EGAT launched a Shirt No. 5 initiative to promote the use of energy efficient clothes that were wrinkle-free after washing and thus didn't require ironing. The Thailand Textile Institute and 22 cloth producers collaborated in this campaign to develop clothes to reduce the use of electricity from ironing. Cloth products started to be labeled with Label No. 5 in January, 2018.

== Reserve capacity concerns ==
Several critics have pointed out that EGAT's in-house generating capacity coupled with its power purchases from other suppliers has resulted in excessive reserve capacity. One such critic has been the editorial board of the Bangkok Post. They point out that in May 2017, Thailand's peak power demand was 28,578 MW. Total EGAT installed and purchased power capacity in May 2017 was 41,903 MW, leaving a reserve power capacity of 13,325 MW, 46 percent of total May demand. Industry standard best practice is that a 15 percent reserve power capacity is sufficient to "...maintain a stable power supply." In July 2017, EGAT generated 16,071 MW and purchased 25,652 MW from other suppliers for a total of 41,723 MW.

Updated figures reported in June 2018 indicate that Thailand has the capacity to produce or purchase 42,547 megawatts. Peak demand as of 31 April 2018 was recorded at 29,968 megawatts. Thus Thailand has a installed reserve margin of 58 percent. The "internationally accepted ideal reserve margin...[is] 15 percent of peak demand."

== Plans and protests ==
EGAT continues to press forward with plans to construct six new coal-fired power plants by 2025 in spite of institutions such as the World Bank halting funding for new coal projects except in "rare circumstances". Rachel Kyte, the World Bank climate change envoy, said continued use of coal was exacting a heavy cost on some of the world's poorest countries, in local health impacts as well as climate change, which is imposing even graver consequences on the developing world. "In general globally we need to wean ourselves off coal,...There is a huge social cost to coal and a huge social cost to fossil fuels...if you want to be able to breathe clean air." EGAT "...has—in TV commercials—ridiculed renewable energy as expensive and insufficient to deal with rising electricity demand."

A persistent criticism of EGAT is that it has paid scant attention to the demand side of the energy equation. Rather than build more carbon-powered plants, working to reduce demand and use existing supplies more efficiently has taken a back seat to network expansion. Opportunities for big savings exist: on 29 March 2014, Thailand observed "Earth Hour." For one hour, superfluous lighting was turned off, resulting in a savings of 1,778 megawatts, the energy equivalent of a new power plant, and more than six million baht in power bills.

EGAT's plans for future developments have been dogged by protests by local residents:

=== Krabi power plant ===
In mid-2015, government plans to build an 800 megawatt coal-fired electricity generating station (EGAT Coal-Fired TH #3) in Krabi Province have generated protests and hunger strikes by those opposed to the plant who say that it would endanger Krabi's relatively pristine environment. EGAT has pushed forward with development despite not having completed an environmental impact study. It intends to start the bidding process without an environmental assessment in order to "save time". The Krabi site is one of nine coal-fired plants planned for southern Thailand to be constructed over the next two decades to off-set the depletion of natural gas fields in the Gulf of Thailand. Opponents of the plan say their demands—which include a three-year waiting period to see if the province can produce 100 percent renewable energy—have been ignored.

In August 2015, the prime minister ordered the formation of a commission composed of state agencies, EGAT, and citizen activists to find solutions to the power plant conflict. Gen Sakon Sajjanit was appointed committee chairman. It was agreed that the government put a hold on consideration of the Environmental Impact Assessment and Environmental Health Impact Assessments; that EGAT postpone bidding for the plant and the seaport; and that all parties allow Krabi to try to produce 100 percent renewable energy for three years with government support. EGAT broke the agreement as it proceeded with the bidding process, won by the Power Construction Corporation of China and Italian-Thai Development PCL. In November 2016, Prime Minister Prayut Chan-o-cha put the project "on-hold". According to the Bangkok Post, this is a move to "buy time".

In early 2017, following a series of protests by those opposed to a coal-fired plant in Krabi, Prime Minister Prayut Chan-o-cha ordered that new environmental (EIA) and health impact assessments (EHIA) be conducted for the Krabi project. He directed that the public must be allowed to have its say. "A new power plant will certainly be built, but how? We have to take a look at what is good, safe and can deal with power shortages in order to ensure power security. There must be a balance between fossil fuels and recyclable energy," the prime minister said. The new assessments are expected to take at least two and a half years to complete, which means the Krabi power plant will be delayed to 2024 from its original schedule of 2019. EGAT officials insisted that a new power plant is still needed in south Thailand to meet the region's power demands, which increase by four to five percent annually.

In February 2018 the Ministry of Energy put the Krabi coal-fired power plant "on hold" for three years pending additional EHIA (environmental and health impact assessment) and EIA (environmental impact assessment) studies.

=== Thepha power plant ===
In Songkhla Province's Thepha District, a public hearing on EGAT's plans to build a coal-fired plant was ringed with razor wire to prevent opponents of the plan from gaining access to the hearing. The hearing, the third and final hearing on the Environment and Health Impact Assessment (EHIA) for the 2,400 megawatt plant, was policed by 400 soldiers, police, and volunteers. Some attendees admitted being transported to the hearing by local village leaders, who also provided them with gifts and food coupons. Songkhla Governor Thamrong Charoenkul chaired the hearing despite questions raised regarding his neutrality. He told the hearing that the project will benefit Thepa residents. "Since Egat has proposed the project, Thepha is now known nationwide. Shouldn't we be proud about that?" he said. Anuchart Palakawongse Na Ayudhya, director of EGAT's Project Environment Division, insisted EGAT's hearings were lawful. "We have organised the public review step by step according to the law," he said. Anuchart said EGAT did not bar anyone from expressing their opinions. "It's impossible to cancel the project. Most Thepha people support it," he said.

On 17 August 2017, an expert committee of the Natural Resources and Environmental Policy and Planning Office (ONEP) approved the 2,200-megawatt coal-fired power plant's EHIA, removing one of the last hurdles to the plant's construction. The EHIA's approval was met with renewed criticism. The Bangkok Post commented that, "These...assessments turn out to be just another rubber stamp for operators — in this case...EGAT...." ONEP responded to criticism by defending its approval. A construction schedule has not yet been published.

In February 2018 the Ministry of Energy put the Thepha coal-fired power plant "on hold" for three years pending additional EHIA (environmental and health impact assessment) and EIA (environmental impact assessment) studies.

=== Salween River projects ===
Thailand's Power Development Plan, approved in May 2015 (PDP 2015), outlines the government's plans to import up to 10,000 MW of electricity from Myanmar over the next two decades. Much of this electricity is expected to come from planned hydro-power projects on the Salween River ("Thanlwin" in Myanmar). Thailand and Myanmar have signed an agreement for the Salween dams project, five dams on the Salween and another dam on the Tenasserim River. EGAT has been pushing forward two projects: the 1,360 MW Hatgyi dam in Kayin State and the 7,100 MW Mong Ton dam in Shan State (formerly known as the Tasang dam).The Mong Ton dam, in central Shan State, would span the Salween and Pang rivers, covering an area the size of Singapore.

== Litigation ==
EGAT has been the target of several lawsuits brought by neighbours of several of its operations. The best known legal challenge took place in Mae Mo. Mae Mo is the site of a 2,400 MW lignite-fueled power plant run by EGAT. Coal-fired power plants such as Mae Mo can release up to 150 million tonnes of CO_{2} over their design life of 20–25 years, according to Greenpeace-Thailand. The plant has been the target of a series of lawsuits brought by locals who claim that the lignite mining operation and the burning of lignite fuel by EGAT has negatively impacted the environment and the health of those living in the vicinity. A 12-year fight by villagers for compensation for damages ended in victory for the plaintiffs in February 2015. The Supreme Administrative Court in Chiang Mai Province upheld a ruling by the Chiang Mai Administrative Court in 2005. The court handed down a verdict ordering EGAT to pay compensation to 131 plaintiffs, some of them deceased. Plant victims were awarded between 20,000-240,000 baht each, commensurate with their suffering. The total amounts to 25 million baht plus 7.5 percent interest.

Several days earlier, the court had ordered EGAT to return its Mae Mo golf course, adjacent to the open pit lignite mine, to woodland in order to help clean up the air pollution caused by EGAT's Mae Mo operations.

== See also ==
- List of companies of Thailand
- Living River Siam
- Nam Theun II Hydropower Project
- Pak Mun Dam
