= Pak Mun Dam =

- Main wall of the Pak Mun Dam

- Location within Thailand
- Country: Thailand
- Location: Khong Chiam District, Ubon Ratchathani Province
- Coordinates: 15°16′55″N 105°28′6″E
- Construction began: 1990
- Opening date: 1994
- Construction cost: US$240 million

Dam and spillways
- Impounds: Mun River
- Height: 17 m (56 ft)
- Length: 300 m (984 ft)
- Width (crest): 7.5 m (25 ft)

Reservoir
- Creates: Pak Mun Reservoir

Power Station
- Operator: Electricity Generating Authority of Thailand
- Commission date: 1994
- Turbines: 4
- Installed capacity: 136 MW
- Annual generation: 290 GWh

The Pak Mun Dam (Thai: เขื่อนปากมูล, RTGS: Khuean Pak Mun, pronounced [kʰɯ̀a̯n pàːk mūːn]) is a barrage dam and run-of-the-river hydroelectric plant 5.5 km west of the confluence of the Mun and Mekong Rivers in Khong Chiam District, Ubon Ratchathani Province, Thailand. It was constructed by the Electricity Generating Authority of Thailand (EGAT) with support from the World Bank at a total cost of US$240 million, and completed in 1994.

== Environmental impact ==
The project has been criticized for adverse effects on the fisheries of the Mun River, insufficient compensation payments to affected villagers, and failure to produce the projected power output. The immediate impact of the dam was to flood 117 km^{2} of land and displace families. The original plan estimated the displacement of 262 families. In the end, 912 families were displaced and 780 households lost all or part of their land. In all, around 25,000 villagers claim to have been affected by the dam. Protests have been staged at the dam site and outside Government House in Bangkok and critics have called for the dam to be immediately decommissioned. As of 2000, EGAT had paid out 377.7 million baht in relocation compensation, plus 356.9 million baht for loss of fisheries with unsettled fisheries claims amounting to an additional 200 million baht.

In response to concerns about the dam's likely impact on fisheries on the Mun River, a fish ladder was incorporated into the scheme to allow fish into the Mun River to spawn. The fish ladder has been "unsuccessful". A report from the World Commission on Dams found that of 265 fish species previously found in the Mun River, at least 50 had disappeared and numbers of others had declined significantly. The fish catch decreased by 60–80%. It is uncertain what proportion of this decrease is attributable to the dam, and what proportion to other factors.

In response to protests, the government opened the dam gates temporarily in June 2001. Subsequently, a study by Ubon Ratchathani University recommended keeping the gates open for a further five years, and a study by Living River Siam recommended decommissioning the dam. Instead, the Thai Cabinet decided to close the gates for eight months each year from November 2002.

As part of a two-year study to review the development effectiveness of large dams, the World Commission on Dams (WCD) commissioned the Thailand Development Research Institute (TDRI) to conduct a case study on the Pak Mun Dam. TDRI's report, published in 2000, concluded that "...EGAT over-stated the case of project benefits and did no justice to the method of benefit-cost analysis in exaggerating the value of net gains in power production and in claiming irrigation benefits on invalid grounds."
