= Chi River =

River in Thailand

Coordinates: 16.21°N 103.62°E

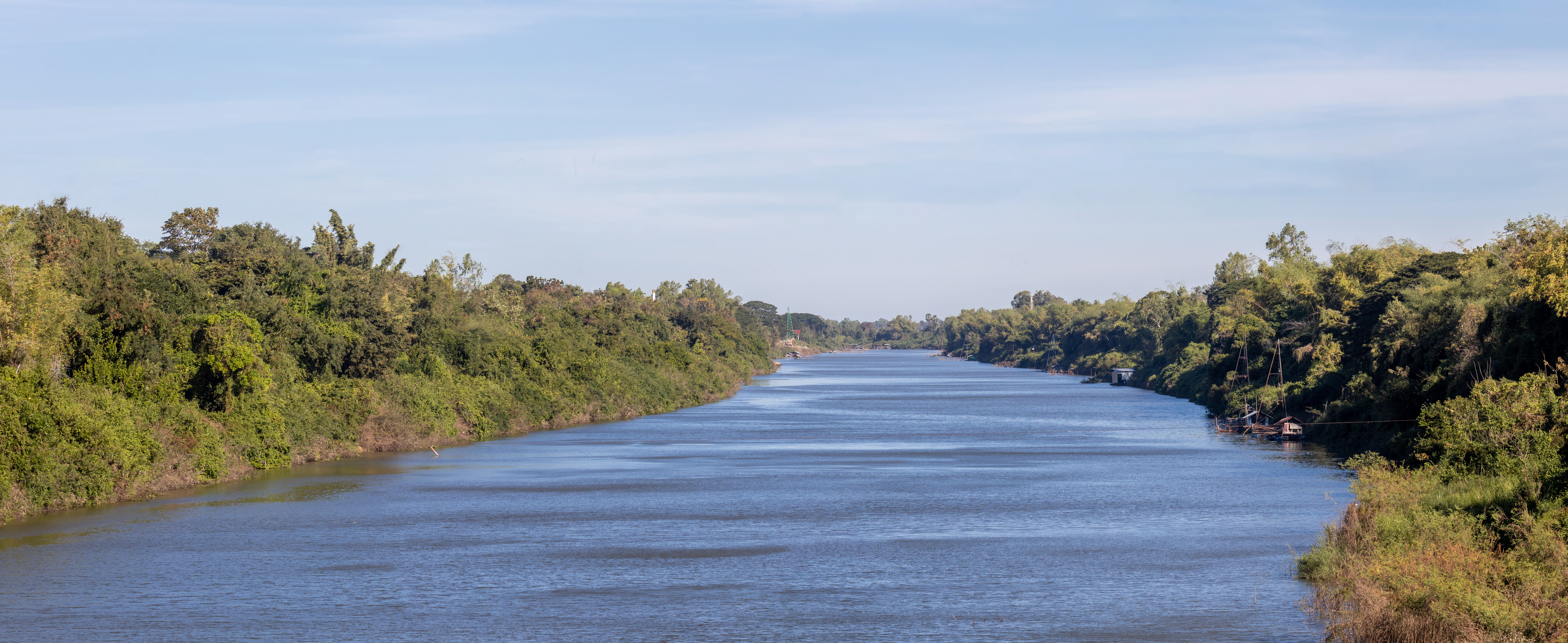
- Chi River in December 2020 bordering between Yasothon and Roi Et provinces

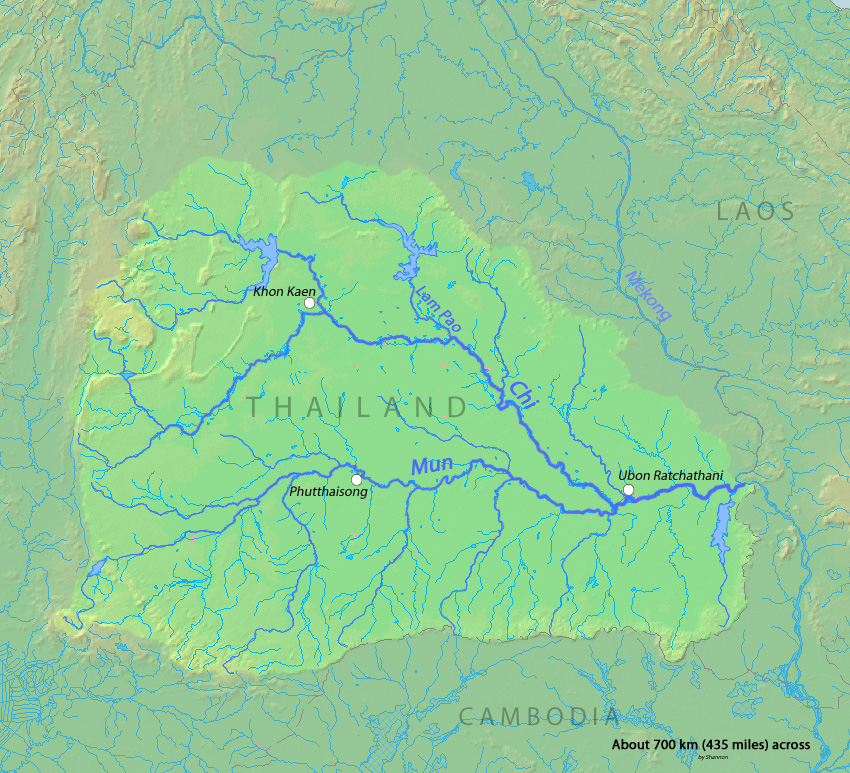
- Map of the Mun River watershed showing the Chi River
- Native name: Mae Si (Thai)

Physical characteristics
- Source
  - location: Chaiyaphum
- Mouth
  - location: Mun river, Sisaket Province
  - elevation: 110 m (360 ft)
- Length: 765 km (475 mi)
- Basin size: 49,480 km^{2} (19,100 sq mi)
- Discharge
  - location: Yasothon
  - average: 290 m^{3}/s (10,000 cu ft/s)
  - maximum: 3,960 m^{3}/s (140,000 cu ft/s)

The Chi River (Thai: แม่น้ำชี, RTGS: Maenam Chi, pronounced [mɛ̂ː.náːm tɕʰīː]; Northeastern Thai: แม่น้ำซี, pronounced [mɛ̄ː.nâːm sîː]) is the longest river flowing wholly within Thailand. It is 765 kilometres (475 mi) long but carries less water than the second longest river, the Mun. The name of the river is "Mae Si" ([sîː]) in the Isan and Lao languages of the region, being transliterated as "Chi" in Bangkok-Thai. In wet seasons there are often flash floods in the floodplain of the Chi River basin. The Chi River is a major tributary of the Mun River which then flows into the Mekong.

== Course ==
The river rises in the Phetchabun Mountains, then runs east through the central Isan provinces of Chaiyaphum, Khon Kaen, and Maha Sarakham, then turns south in Roi Et, runs through Yasothon and joins the Mun in the Kanthararom district of Sisaket Province. The river carries approximately 9.3 cubic kilometres (2.2 mi^{3}) of water per annum.

The river was an 18th-century migration route for the re-peopling of the Khorat Plateau by ethnic Lao people from the left (east) bank of the Mekong resettling on the right bank. This began in 1718 when the first king of the left bank Kingdom of Champasak, King Nokasad, sent a group of some 3,000 subjects led by an official in his service to found the first settlement in the Chi River valley—and indeed anywhere in the interior of the Khorat Plateau—Muang Suwannaphum in present-day Roi Et Province (a history recorded and remembered, largely in terms of the struggle to expand wet-rice cultivation in the river valley). Their descendants are now regarded as a separate ethnic group from the Lao to the north and the central Thai to the southwest.

== Pop culture ==
Chi river is the setting of a Thai TV drama on Channel 7 HD, titled Chart Lam Chi (ชาติลำชี; The River Chi's Protector). It was an action-drama TV series that aired from March 14 to April 25, 2018, remake from namesake film in 1969 (starred by Mitr Chaibancha and Petchara Chaowarat).
