= Mun River =

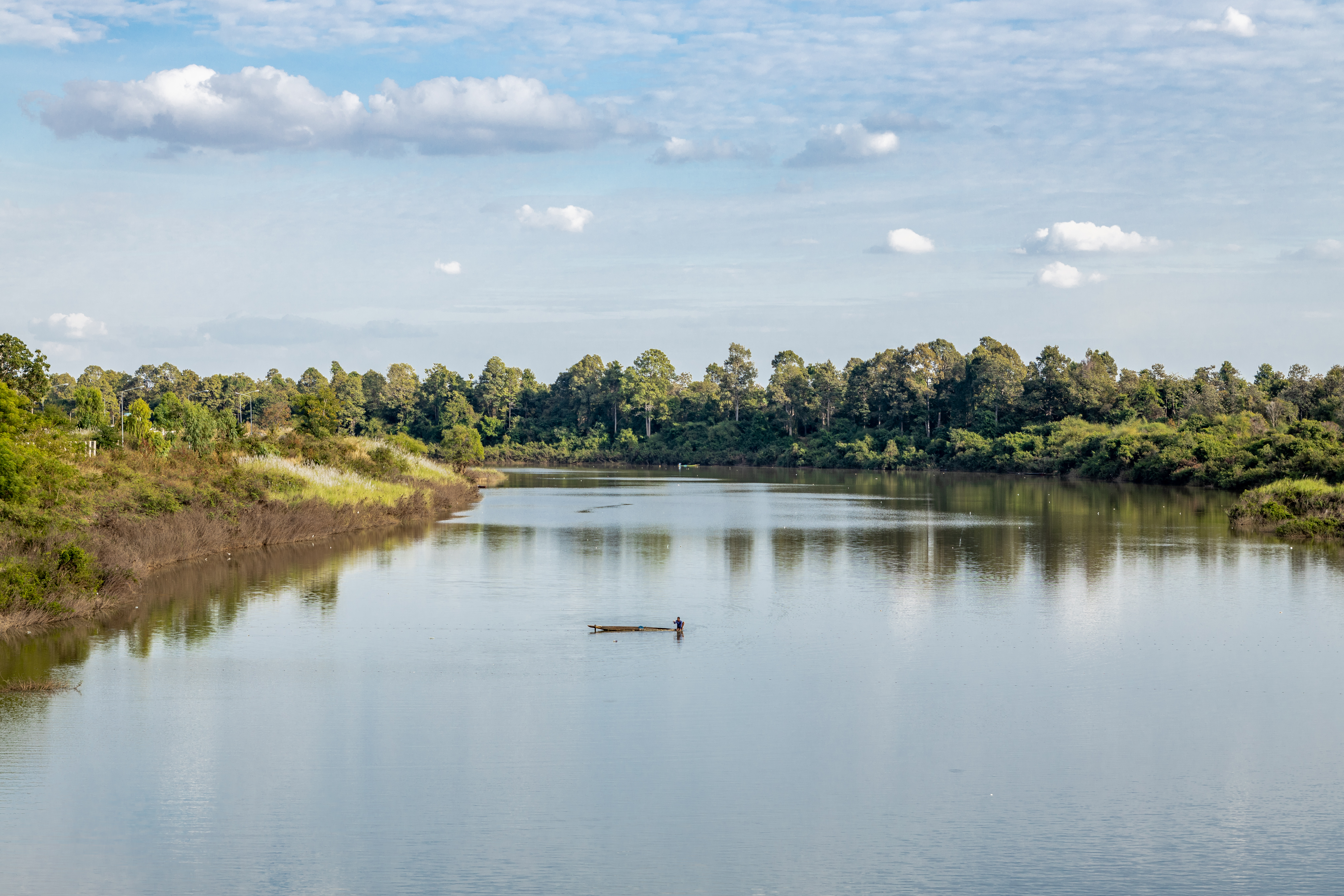
- The Mun River in Rasi Salai Dam during dry season, Rasi Salai District, Sisaket Province

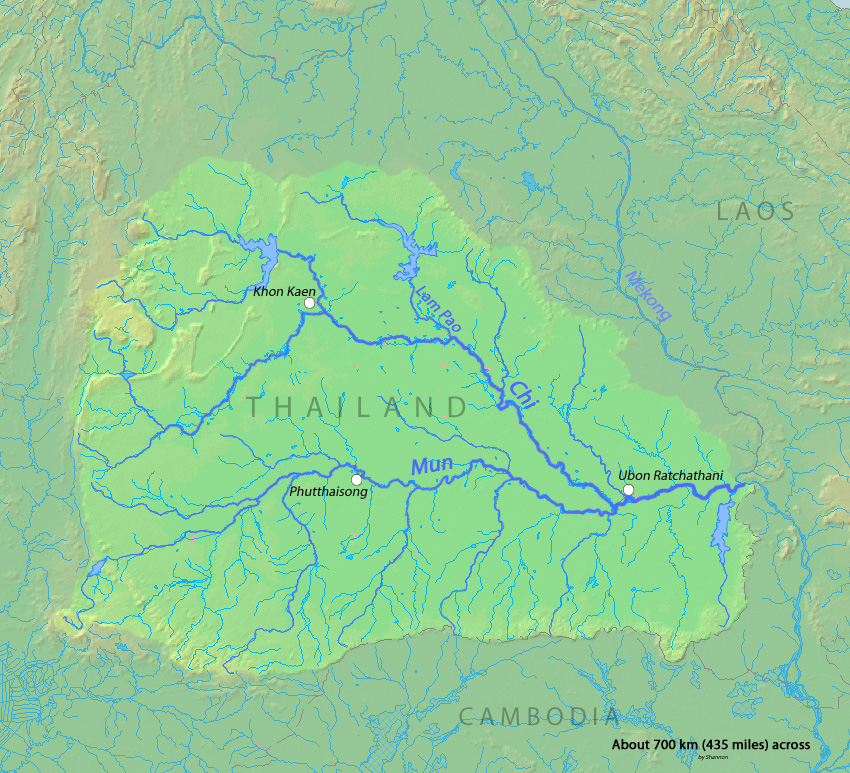
- Map of the Mun River drainage basin
- Native name: แม่น้ำมูล (Thai)

Location
- Country: Thailand

Physical characteristics
- Source
  - location: Nakhon Ratchasima
  - elevation: 530 m (1,740 ft)
- Mouth: Mekong River
  - location: Amphoe Khong Chiam, Ubon Ratchathani province
  - coordinates: 15°19′14″N 105°30′29″E
  - elevation: 97 m (318 ft)
- Length: 641 km (398 mi)
- Basin size: 119,180 km^{2} (46,020 sq mi)
- Discharge
  - location: Mekong River, Ubon Ratchathani
  - average: 725 m^{3}/s (25,600 cu ft/s)
  - maximum: 10,015 m^{3}/s (353,700 cu ft/s)

Basin features
- Tributaries
  - left: Chi River
  - right: Lam Dom Noi
- Longest source length: Chi River: 1047 km ⟶ Mun River: 115 km ⟶ Mekong River: Total: 1,162 km

The Mun River (Thai: แม่น้ำมูล, RTGS: Maenam Mun, pronounced [mɛ̂ː.náːm mūːn]; Northeastern Thai: แม่น้ำมูล, pronounced [mɛ̄ː.nȁːm mûːn]), sometimes spelled Moon River, is a tributary of the Mekong River. It carries approximately 26 cubic kilometres (6.2 mi^{3}) of water per year.

== Geography ==
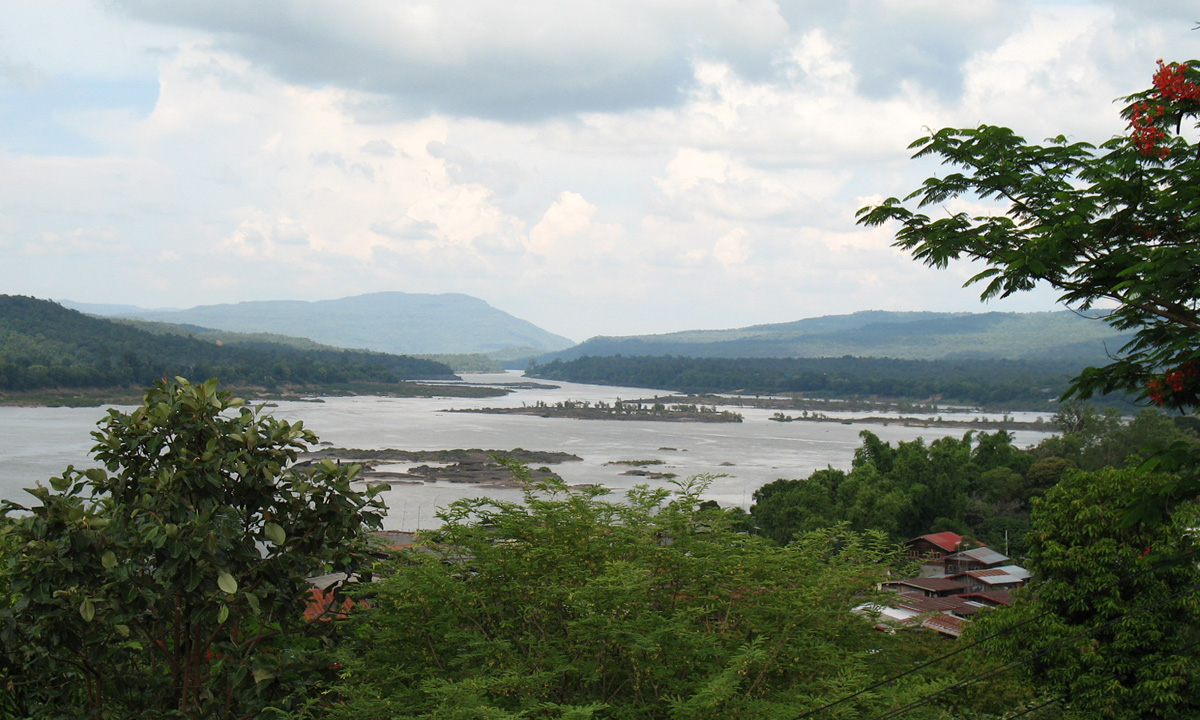
The mouth of the Mun River on the Mekong

The river begins in the Khao Yai National Park area of the Sankamphaeng Range, near Nakhon Ratchasima in northeast Thailand. It flows east through the Khorat Plateau in southern Isan (Nakhon Ratchasima, Buriram, Surin, and Sisaket Provinces) for 750 kilometres (466 mi), until it joins the Mekong at Khong Chiam in Ubon Ratchathani. The Mun River's main tributary is the Chi River, which joins it in the Kanthararom District of Sisaket Province.

== History ==
Thanks to the Andy Williams hit song, the Mun River was called "Moon River" by US Air Force personnel stationed at Ubon Ratchathani airbase during the Vietnam War. The spelling is still fairly common.

The controversial Pak Mun Dam, which is charged with causing environmental damage, is near the river's confluence with the Mekong.

== Tributaries ==
- Lam Dom Noi
- Chi River
- Lam Takhong

== Transport ==
- Seriprachathippatai 2497 Bridge
