= Outline of Thailand =

Country in Southeast Asia

The Flag of Thailand

The Emblem of Thailand depicting the Garuda

The location of Thailand

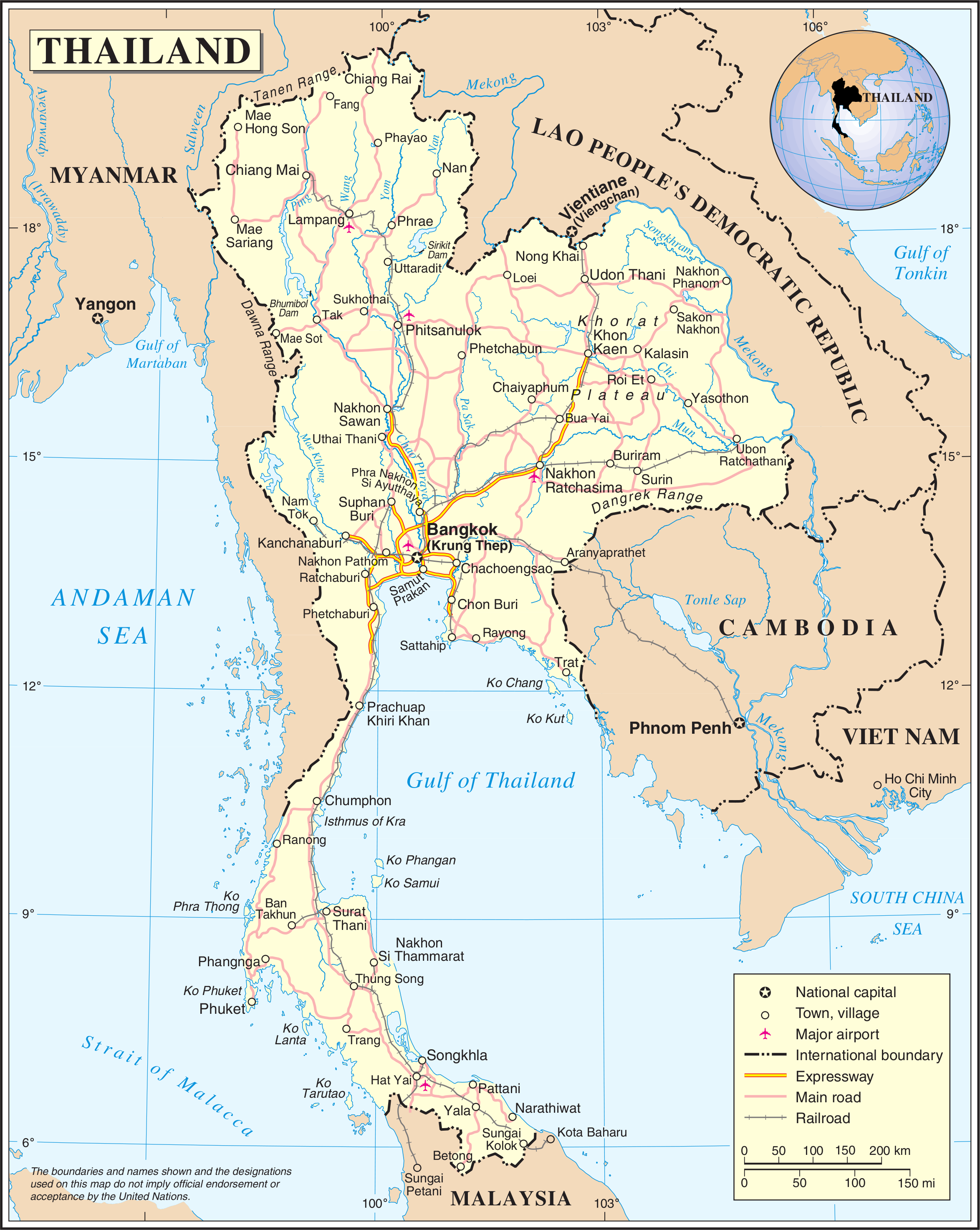
An enlargeable map of the Kingdom of Thailand

The following outline is an overview of and topical guide to Thailand:

Thailand is a sovereign nation in the center of Mainland Southeast Asia. It lies east of the Andaman Sea, between Myanmar, Laos, Cambodia, surrounds the Gulf of Thailand and Malaysia to the south. It was formerly called Siam until 1939. As of 2023, it is a parliamentary constitutional monarchy. Important former Thai kingdoms are Sukhothai, Ayutthaya and Rattanakosin. It had an absolute monarchy for centuries. The first constitution was established in 1932. The monarchy and military have periodically intervened in politics. Thailand experienced rapid economic growth between 1985 and 1996, becoming a newly industrialized country and a major exporter. Manufacturing, agriculture, and tourism are leading sectors of the economy. Thailand was a founding member of ASEAN in 1967, and the country's HDI has been rated as "high" to "very high" (Central Thailand) in 2022. The population of Thailand was 65.95 million in January 2025. The official language is Thai. The Thai people form the majority among 70 ethnic groups. Thailand is the 50th largest country and 3rd largest country in Southeast Asia after Indonesia and Myanmar. There are 6 regions of Thailand. The geography is diverse: Northern and Western Thailand are mountainous, Central Thailand is the heartland with the Chao Phraya River Basin, Northeastern Thailand has the arid Khorat Plateau, Eastern Thailand is coastal with a mountainous interior, while Southern Thailand is narrow with long coastlines.

== General reference ==
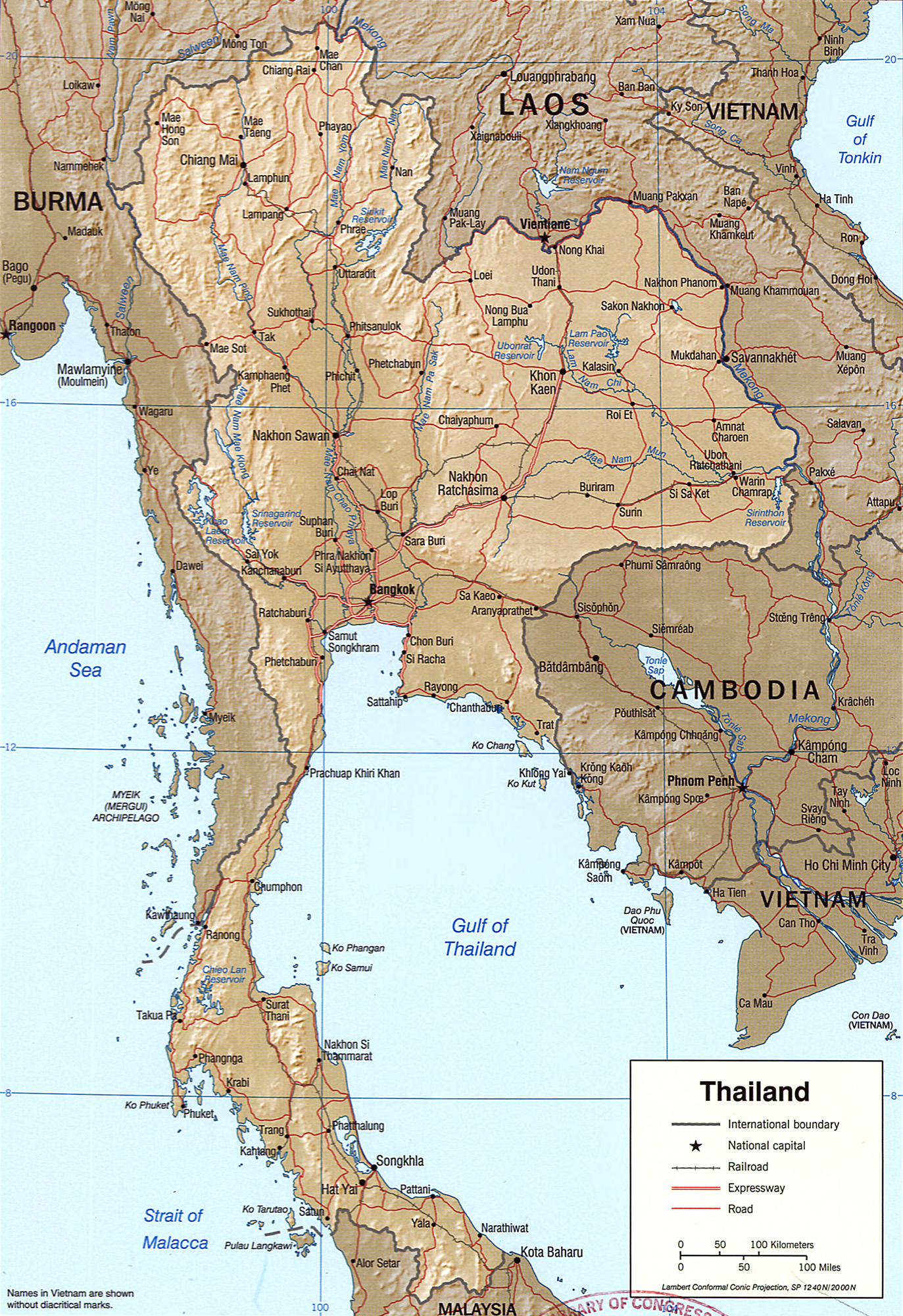
An enlargeable relief map of Thailand

- Pronunciation: /ˈtaɪlænd/
  - Thai: [pratʰêːt tʰaj]
- Common English country names: Thailand, archaic Siam
- Official English country name: The Kingdom of Thailand
- Common endonym(s): Prathet Thai, Thai (ประเทศไทย, ไทย)
- Official endonym(s): Ratcha-anachak Thai (ราชอาณาจักรไทย)
- Adjectival(s): Thai
- Demonym(s): Thai
- Etymology: Name of Thailand
- International rankings of Thailand
- ISO country codes: TH, THA, 764
- ISO region codes: See ISO 3166-2:TH
- Internet country code top-level domain: .th

== Geography of Thailand ==
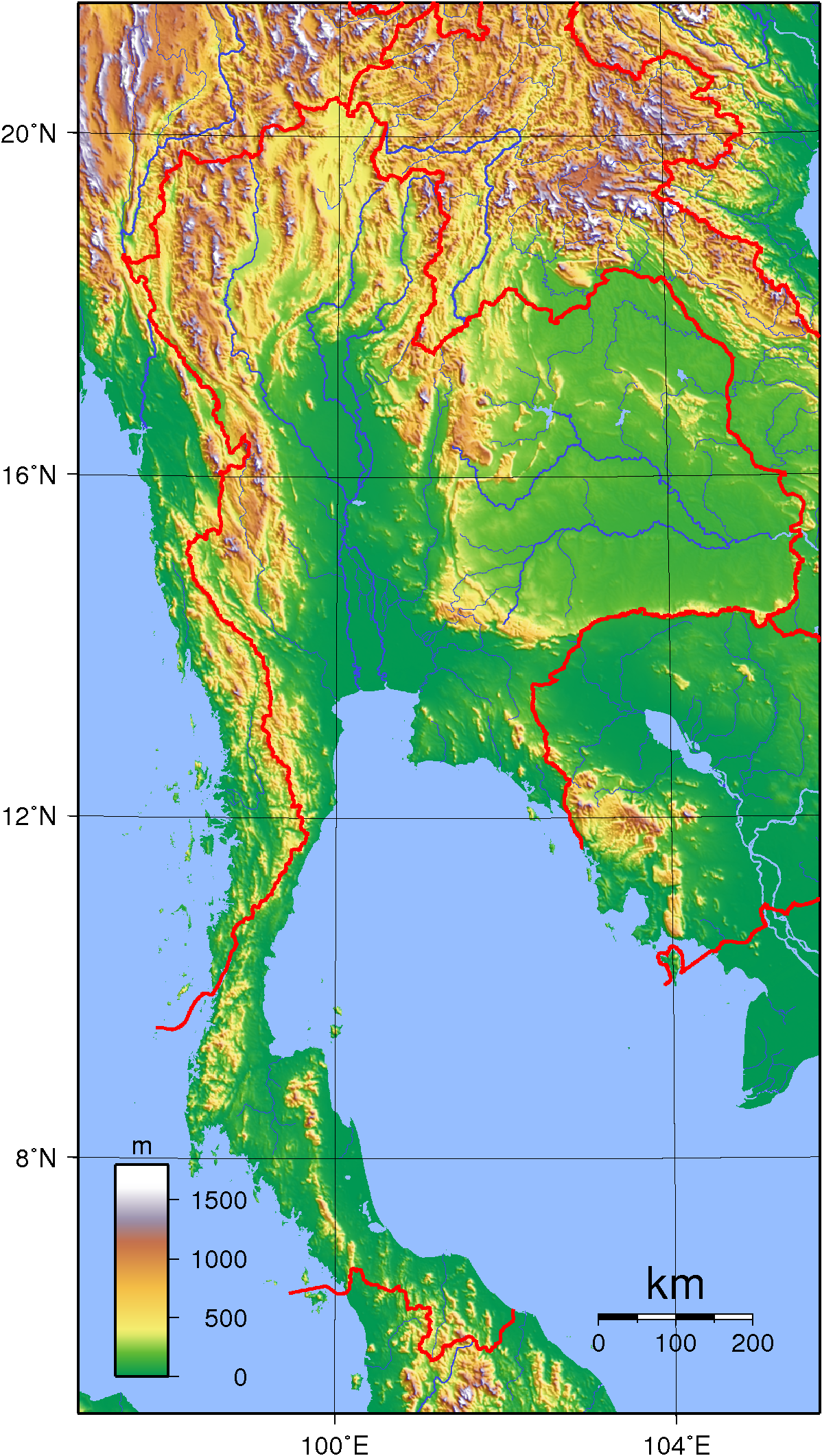
An enlargeable topographic map of Thailand

- Thailand is: a country
- Location:
  - Northern Hemisphere and Eastern Hemisphere
  - Eurasia
    - Asia
      - Southeast Asia
        - Mainland Southeast Asia
  - Time zone: Indochina Time (UTC+07)
  - Extreme points of Thailand
    - North: Mae Sai district (20°28′N 99°57′E)
    - South: Betong district (5°37′N 101°8′E)
    - East: Khong Chiam district (15°38′N 105°38′E)
    - West: Mae Sariang district (18°34′N 97°21′E)
    - High: Doi Inthanon 2,565 m (8,415 ft)
    - Low: Andaman Sea −3,000 m (−9,843 ft)
  - Land boundaries: 4,863 km (3,022 mi)

Myanmar 1,800 km (1,100 mi)
Laos 1,754 km (1,090 mi)
Cambodia 803 km (499 mi)
Malaysia 506 km (314 mi)

- Coastline: 3,219 km (2,000 mi)

- Population of Thailand: 65,975,198 people (8 Jan 2025 estimate) - 22nd most populous country
- Area of Thailand: 513,115 km^{2} (198,115 sq mi) - 49th largest country
- Time in Thailand
  - Thai lunar calendar
  - Thai solar calendar
- Atlas of Thailand
- Thai addressing system

=== Environment of Thailand ===
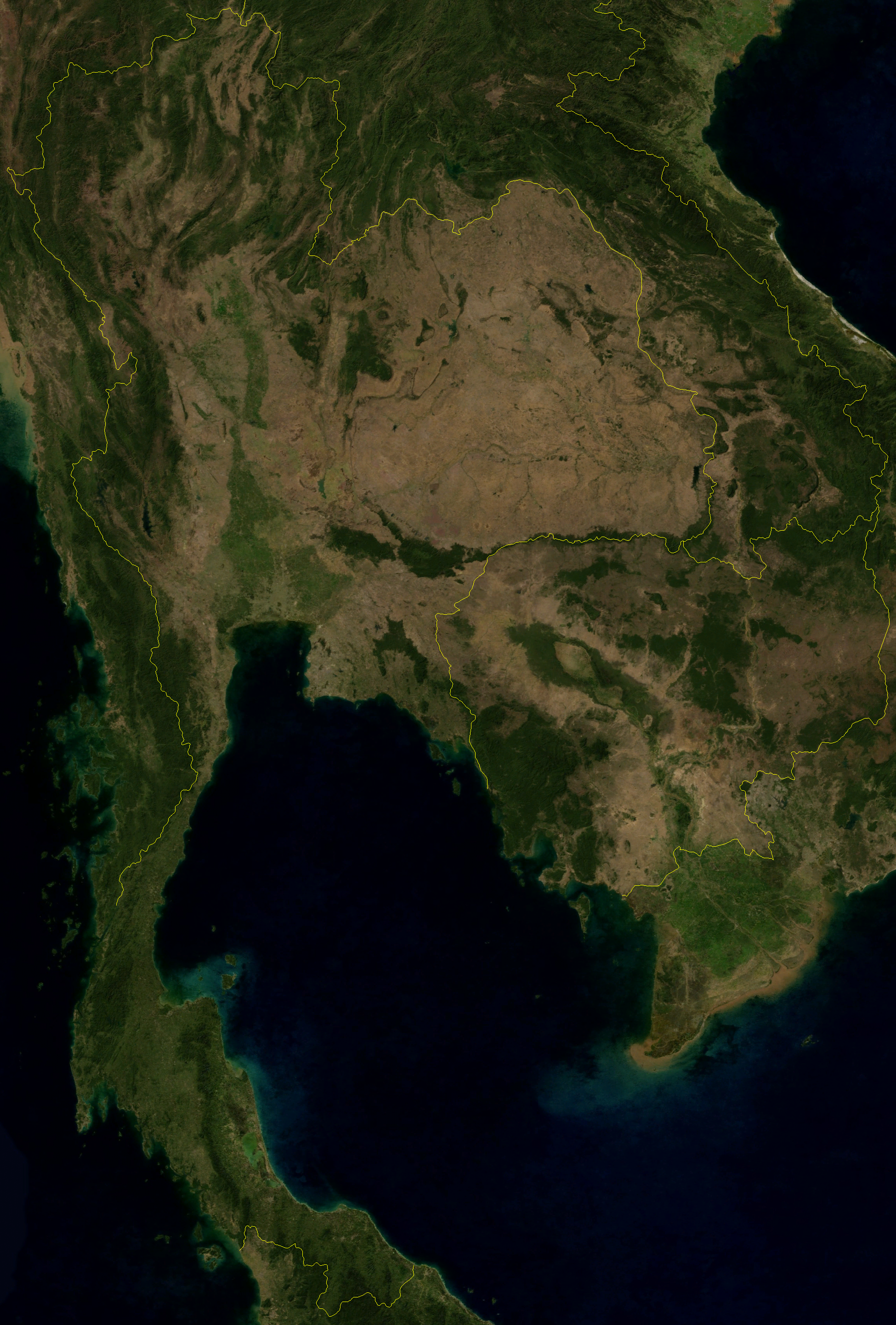
An enlargeable satellite image of Thailand

- Climate of Thailand
- Effect of the 2004 Indian Ocean earthquake on Thailand
- Environmental issues in Thailand
  - Deforestation in Thailand
- Renewable energy in Thailand
- Protected areas of Thailand
  - Biosphere reserves in Thailand
  - Forest parks of Thailand
  - Historical parks of Thailand
  - National parks of Thailand
- Wildlife of Thailand
  - Birds of Thailand
  - Mammals of Thailand

==== Natural geographic features of Thailand ====
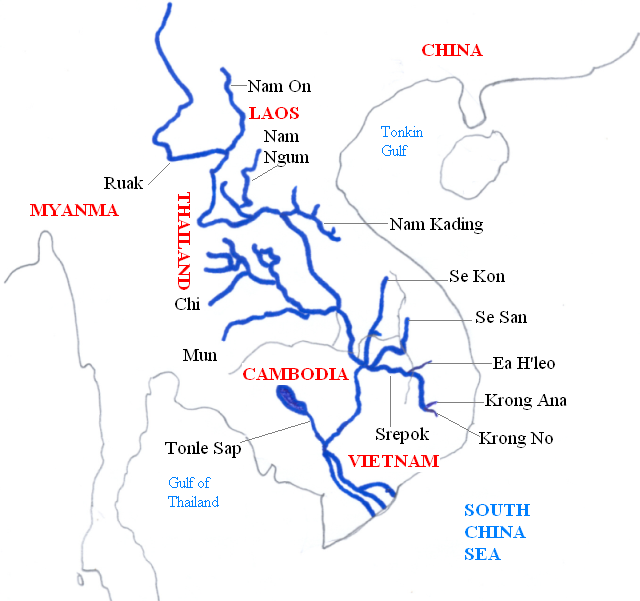
Mekong River System

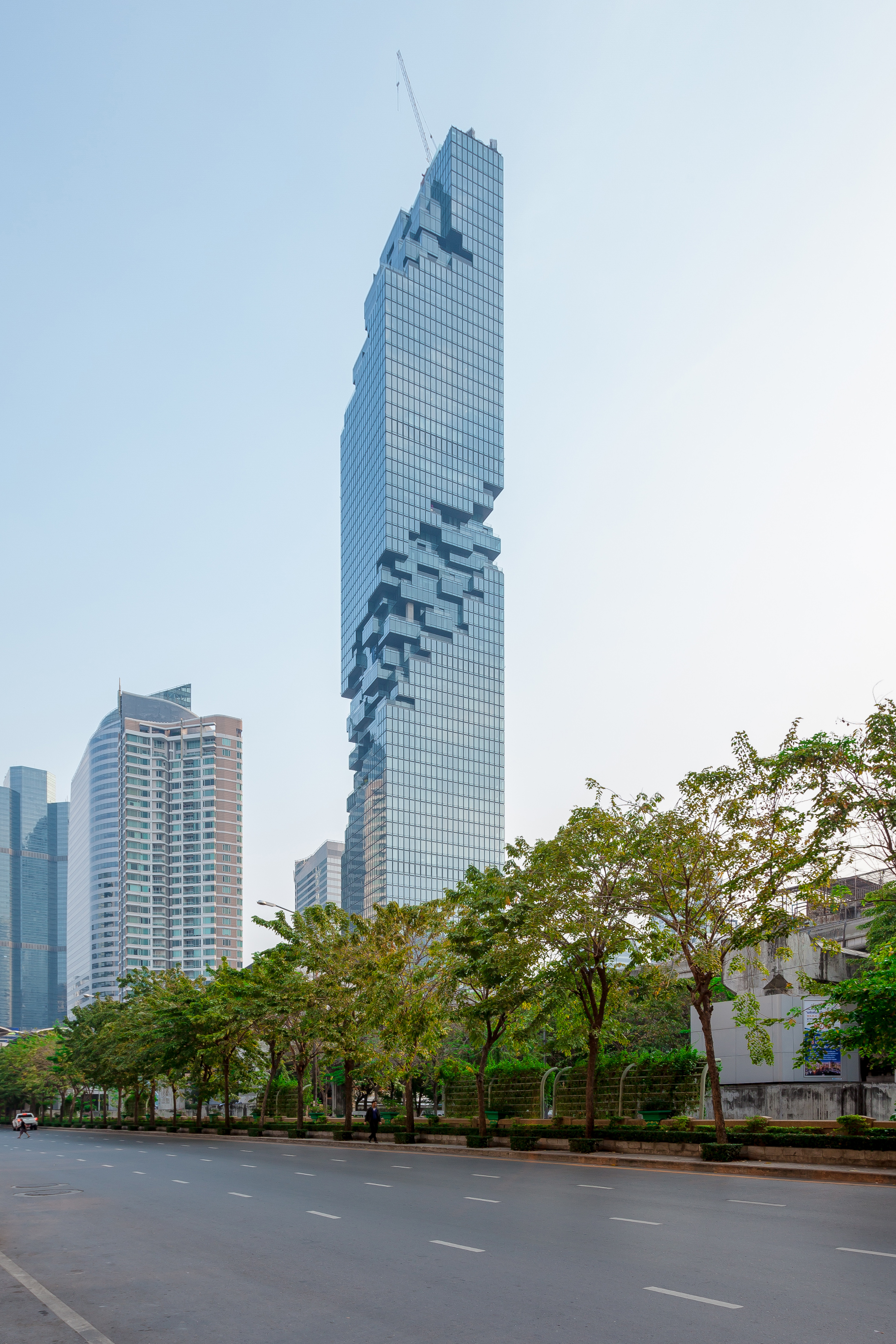
Mahanakhon, once the tallest building in Thailand

- Islands of Thailand
- Mountains in Thailand
  - Thai highlands
  - Volcanoes in Thailand
- Rivers of Thailand
  - River systems of Thailand
- World Heritage Sites in Thailand

=== Regions of Thailand ===
- Northern Thailand
- Northeastern Thailand
- Western Thailand
- Central Thailand
- Eastern Thailand
- Southern Thailand

Economic regions

- Eastern seaboard of Thailand

==== Administrative divisions of Thailand ====
- Provinces of Thailand
  - Districts of Thailand
    - Tambon ("commune" or "subdistrict")
      - Thesaban ("municipality")
      - Muban ("village")

===== Provinces of Thailand =====
Thailand is divided into 76 provinces (จังหวัด, changwat) and the metropolitan municipality Bangkok (กรุงเทพมหานคร, Krung Thep Maha Nakhon).

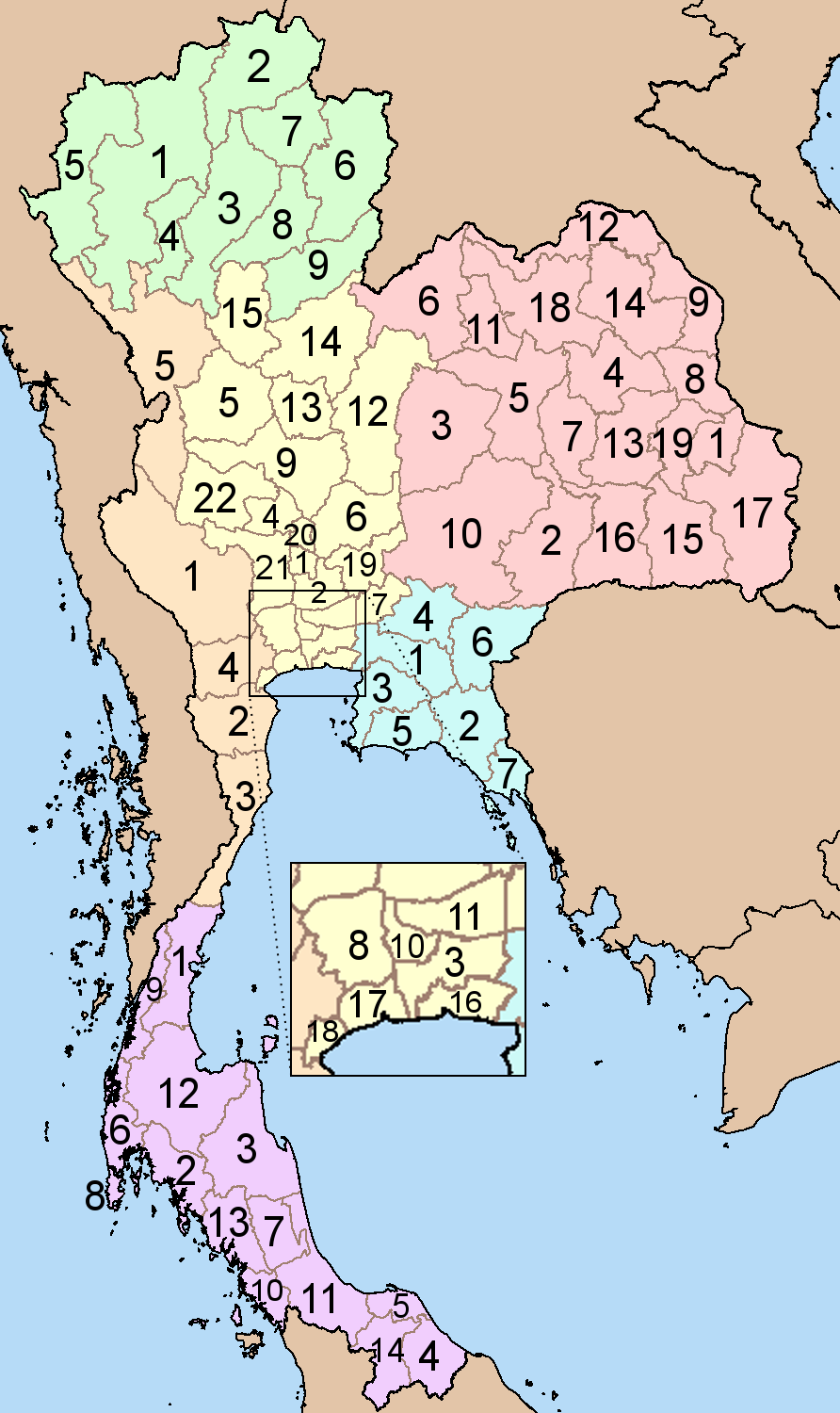
Map showing the 76 provinces and 1 metropolitan municipality (Bangkok) of Thailand

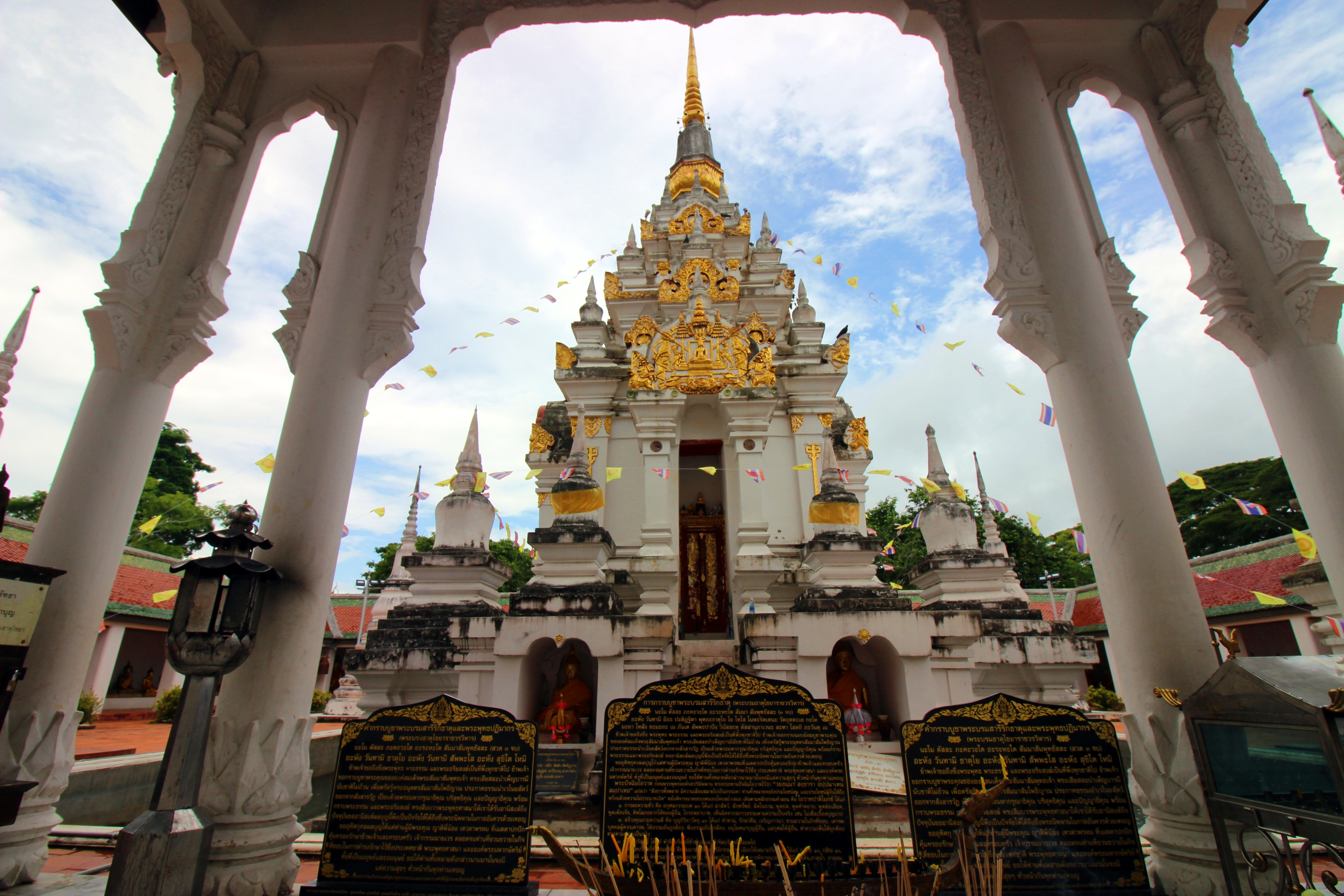
A chedi built in Srivijaya period, Amphoe Chaiya, Surat Thani Province

North
1. Chiang Mai (เชียงใหม่)
2. Chiang Rai (เชียงราย)
3. Lampang (ลำปาง)
4. Lamphun (ลำพูน)
5. Mae Hong Son (แม่ฮ่องสอน)
6. Nan (น่าน)
7. Phayao (พะเยา)
8. Phrae (แพร่)
9. Uttaradit (อุตรดิตถ์)

West

1. Kanchanaburi (กาญจนบุรี)
2. Phetchaburi (เพชรบุรี)
3. Prachuap Khiri Khan (ประจวบคีรีขันธ์)
4. Ratchaburi (ราชบุรี)
5. Tak (ตาก)

Central

1. Ang Thong (อ่างทอง)
2. Phra Nakhon Si Ayutthaya Province (พระนครศรีอยุธยา)
3. Bangkok (Krung Thep Maha Nakhon), self-governing district (กรุงเทพ ฯ)
4. Chai Nat (ชัยนาท)
5. Kamphaeng Phet (กำแพงเพชร)
6. Lopburi (ลพบุรี)
7. Nakhon Nayok (นครนายก)
8. Nakhon Pathom (นครปฐม)
9. Nakhon Sawan (นครสวรรค์)
10. Nonthaburi (นนทบุรี)
11. Pathum Thani (ปทุมธานี)
12. Phetchabun (เพชรบูรณ์)
13. Phichit (พิจิตร)
14. Phitsanulok (พิษณุโลก)
15. Sukhothai (สุโขทัย)
16. Samut Prakan (สมุทรปราการ)
17. Samut Sakhon (สมุทรสาคร)
18. Samut Songkhram (สมุทรสงคราม)
19. Saraburi (สระบุรี)
20. Sing Buri (สิงห์บุรี)
21. Suphan Buri (สุพรรณบุรี)
22. Uthai Thani (อุทัยธานี)

Northeast

1. Amnat Charoen (อำนาจเจริญ)
2. Bueng Kan (บึงกาฬ)
3. Buri Ram (บุรีรัมย์)
4. Chaiyaphum (ชัยภูมิ)
5. Kalasin (กาฬสินธุ์)
6. Khon Kaen (ขอนแก่น)
7. Loei (เลย)
8. Maha Sarakham (มหาสารคาม)
9. Mukdahan (มุกดาหาร)
10. Nakhon Phanom (นครพนม)
11. Nakhon Ratchasima (นครราชสีมา)
12. Nong Bua Lamphu (หนองบัวลำภู)
13. Nong Khai (หนองคาย)
14. Roi Et (ร้อยเอ็ด)
15. Sakon Nakhon (สกลนคร)
16. Si Sa Ket (ศรีสะเกษ)
17. Surin (สุรินทร์)
18. Ubon Ratchathani (อุบลราชธานี)
19. Udon Thani (อุดรธานี)
20. Yasothon (ยโสธร)

East

1. Chachoengsao (ฉะเชิงเทรา)
2. Chanthaburi (จันทบุรี)
3. Chonburi (ชลบุรี)
4. Prachin Buri (ปราจีนบุรี)
5. Rayong (ระยอง)
6. Sa Kaeo (สระแก้ว)
7. Trat (ตราด)

South

1. Chumphon (ชุมพร)
2. Krabi (กระบี่)
3. Nakhon Si Thammarat (นครศรีธรรมราช)
4. Narathiwat (นราธิวาส)
5. Pattani (ปัตตานี)
6. Phang Nga (พังงา)
7. Phatthalung (พัทลุง)
8. Phuket (ภูเก็ต)
9. Ranong (ระนอง)
10. Satun (สตูล)
11. Songkhla (สงขลา)
12. Surat Thani (สุราษฎร์ธานี)
13. Trang (ตรัง)
14. Yala (ยะลา)

===== Districts of Thailand =====
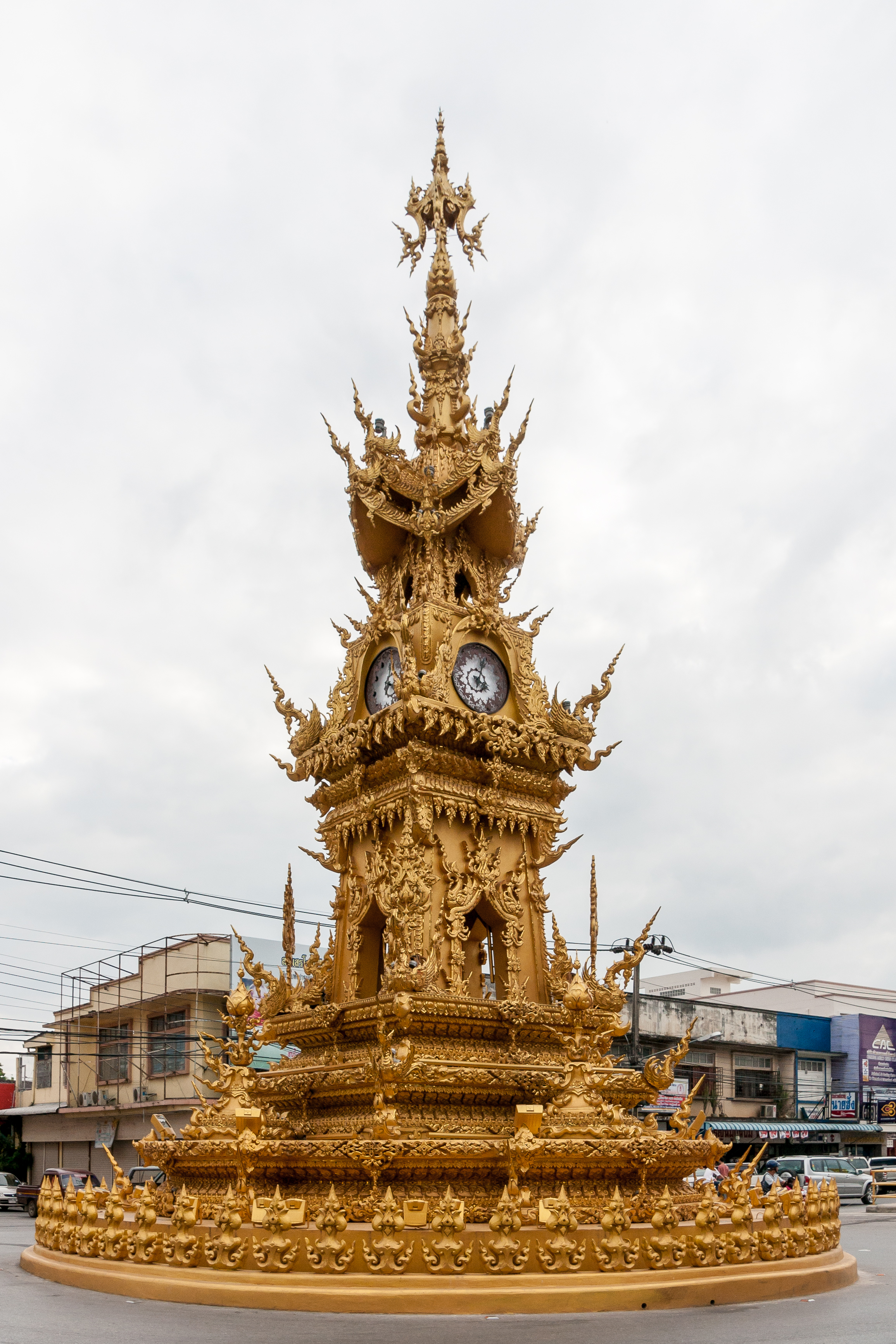
Chiang Rai city clock tower in the middle of Amphoe Meaung Chiang Rai

Altogether Thailand has 877 districts (อำเภอ; Amphoe), not including the 50 districts of Bangkok which are called khet (เขต) since the Bangkok administration reform in 1972.

===== Cities in Thailand =====
- List of municipalities in Thailand
- Capital of Thailand: Bangkok (กรุงเทพมหานคร)

== Government and politics of Thailand ==
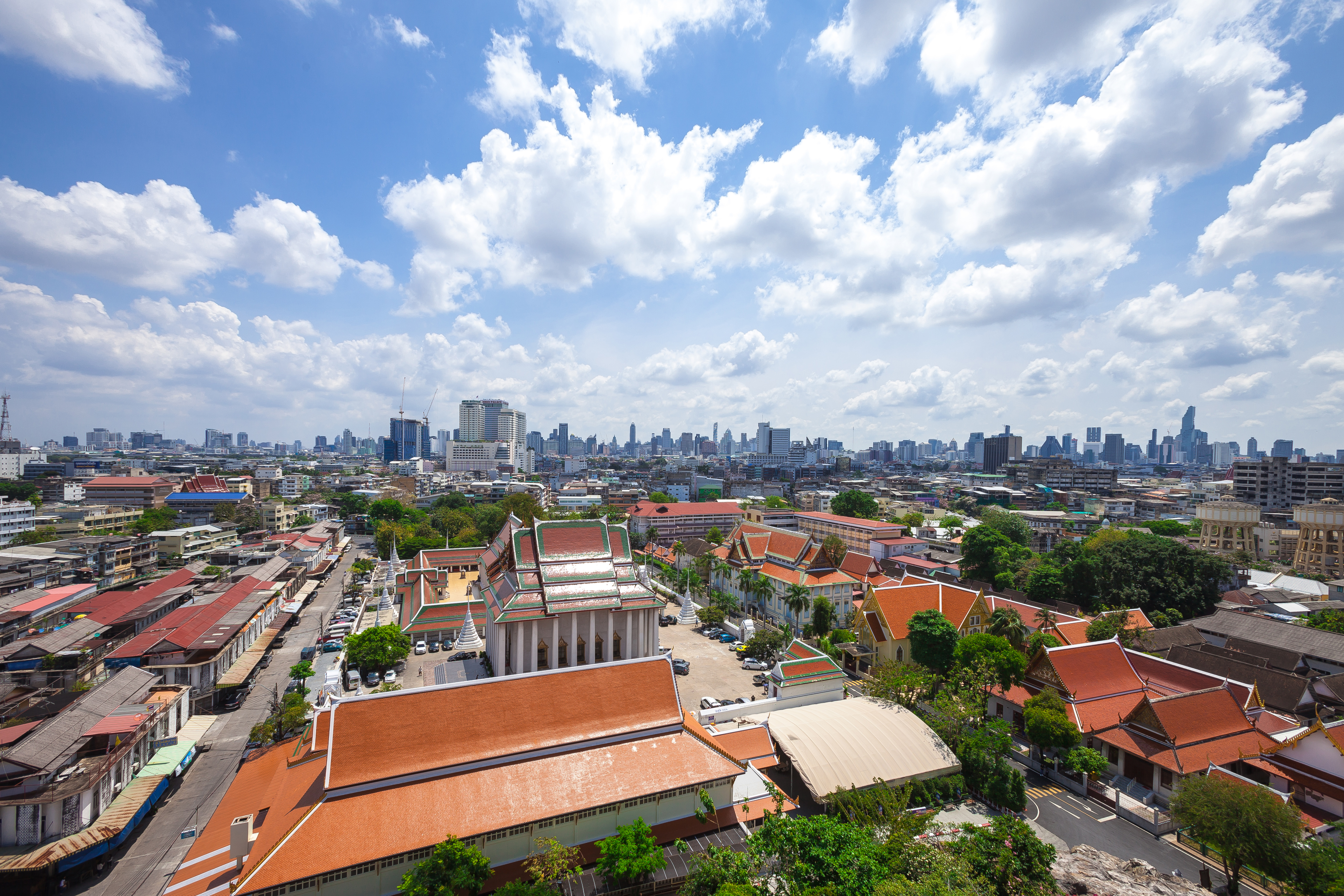
Bangkok, the capital city of Thailand

- Constitution of Thailand
- Form of government: Constitutional monarchy
- Capital of Thailand: Bangkok (Krung Thep Maha Nakhon)
- Conflicts in Thailand
  - South Thailand insurgency
  - 2014 Thai coup d'état
  - 2020–2021 Thai protests
  - 2025 Thai political crisis
- Elections in Thailand
    - 1933
    - 1937
    - 1946
    - 1948
    - February 1957
    - December 1957
    - 1969
    - 1975
    - 1976
    - 1983
    - 1986
    - 1988
    - March 1992
    - September 1992
    - 1995
    - 1996
    - 2001
    - 2005
    - 2006
    - 2007
    - 2011
    - 2014
    - 2019
    - 2023
    - 2026
- Royal House of Thailand
  - House of Mahidol
  - Palace Law of Succession
    - Succession to the Thai throne
  - Bureau of the Royal Household
- Constitutional organizations of Thailand
- Political parties in Thailand
  - Bhumjaithai Party
  - People's Party
  - Pheu Thai Party
  - Kla Tham Party
  - Democrat Party
- Same-sex marriage in Thailand

=== Branches of the government of Thailand ===
==== Executive branch of the government of Thailand ====
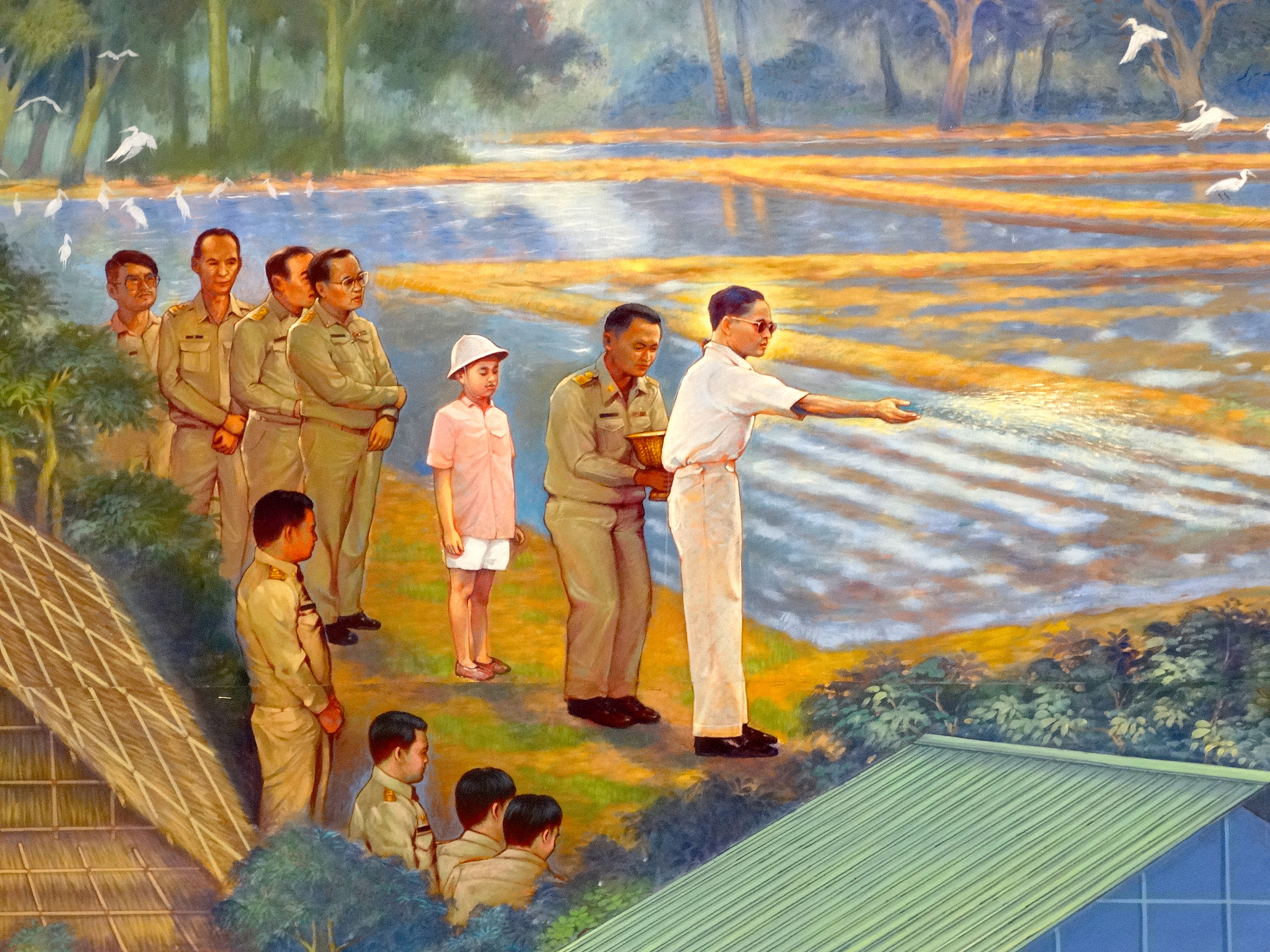
A painting shows the late King Bhumibol and young Vajiralongkorn

- Head of state: King of Thailand, Vajiralongkorn
  - Coronation of the Thai monarch
- Head of government: Prime Minister of Thailand, Anutin Charnvirakul
- Cabinet of Thailand
  - Ministries of Thailand

==== Legislative branch of the government of Thailand ====
- National Assembly of Thailand (bicameral)
  - Upper house: Senate of Thailand
  - Lower house: House of Representatives of Thailand

==== Judicial branch of the government of Thailand ====
- Constitution Tribunal
  - Rulings of the Constitutional Court of Thailand
- Administrative Court of Thailand
- Criminal Court of Thailand
- No juries

=== Foreign relations of Thailand ===
- Diplomatic missions in Thailand
- Diplomatic missions of Thailand
- Foreign aid to Thailand
- Thailand Customs

==== International organization membership ====
The Kingdom of Thailand is a member of, or participates in:

- United Nations–African Union Mission in Darfur (UNAMID)
- Asian Development Bank (ADB)
- Asia-Pacific Economic Cooperation (APEC)
- Asia-Pacific Telecommunity (APT)
- Association of Southeast Asian Nations (ASEAN)
- Association of Southeast Asian Nations Regional Forum (ARF)
- Bank for International Settlements (BIS)
- Bay of Bengal Initiative for Multi-Sectoral Technical and Economic Cooperation (BIMSTEC)
- Colombo Plan (CP)
- East Asia Summit (EAS)
- Food and Agriculture Organization (FAO)
- Group of 77 (G77)
- International Atomic Energy Agency (IAEA)
- International Bank for Reconstruction and Development (IBRD)
- International Chamber of Commerce (ICC)
- International Civil Aviation Organization (ICAO)
- International Criminal Court (ICCt) (signatory)
- International Criminal Police Organization (Interpol)
- International Development Association (IDA)
- International Federation of Red Cross and Red Crescent Societies (IFRCS)
- International Finance Corporation (IFC)
- International Fund for Agricultural Development (IFAD)
- International Hydrographic Organization (IHO)
- International Labour Organization (ILO)
- International Maritime Organization (IMO)
- International Mobile Satellite Organization (IMSO)
- International Monetary Fund (IMF)
- International Olympic Committee (IOC)
- International Organization for Migration (IOM)
- International Organization for Standardization (ISO)
- International Red Cross and Red Crescent Movement (ICRM)
- International Telecommunication Union (ITU)
- International Telecommunications Satellite Organization (ITSO)
- International Trade Union Confederation (ITUC)
- Inter-Parliamentary Union (IPU)
- Multilateral Investment Guarantee Agency (MIGA)
- Nonaligned Movement (NAM)
- Organisation internationale de la Francophonie (OIF) (observer)
- Organisation of Islamic Cooperation (OIC) (observer)
- Organization for Security and Cooperation in Europe (OSCE) (partner)
- Organisation for the Prohibition of Chemical Weapons (OPCW)
- Organization of American States (OAS) (observer)
- Pacific Islands Forum (PIF) (partner)
- Permanent Court of Arbitration (PCA)
- United Nations (UN)
  - United Nations Conference on Trade and Development (UNCTAD)
  - United Nations Educational, Scientific, and Cultural Organization (UNESCO)
  - United Nations High Commissioner for Refugees (UNHCR)
  - United Nations Industrial Development Organization (UNIDO)
  - United Nations Institute for Training and Research (UNITAR)
  - United Nations Mission in the Sudan (UNMIS)
  - World Health Organization (WHO)
  - World Tourism Organization (UNWTO)
- Universal Postal Union (UPU)
- World Confederation of Labour (WCL)
- World Customs Organization (WCO)
- World Federation of Trade Unions (WFTU)
- World Intellectual Property Organization (WIPO)
- World Meteorological Organization (WMO)
- World Trade Organization (WTO)

=== Law and order in Thailand ===
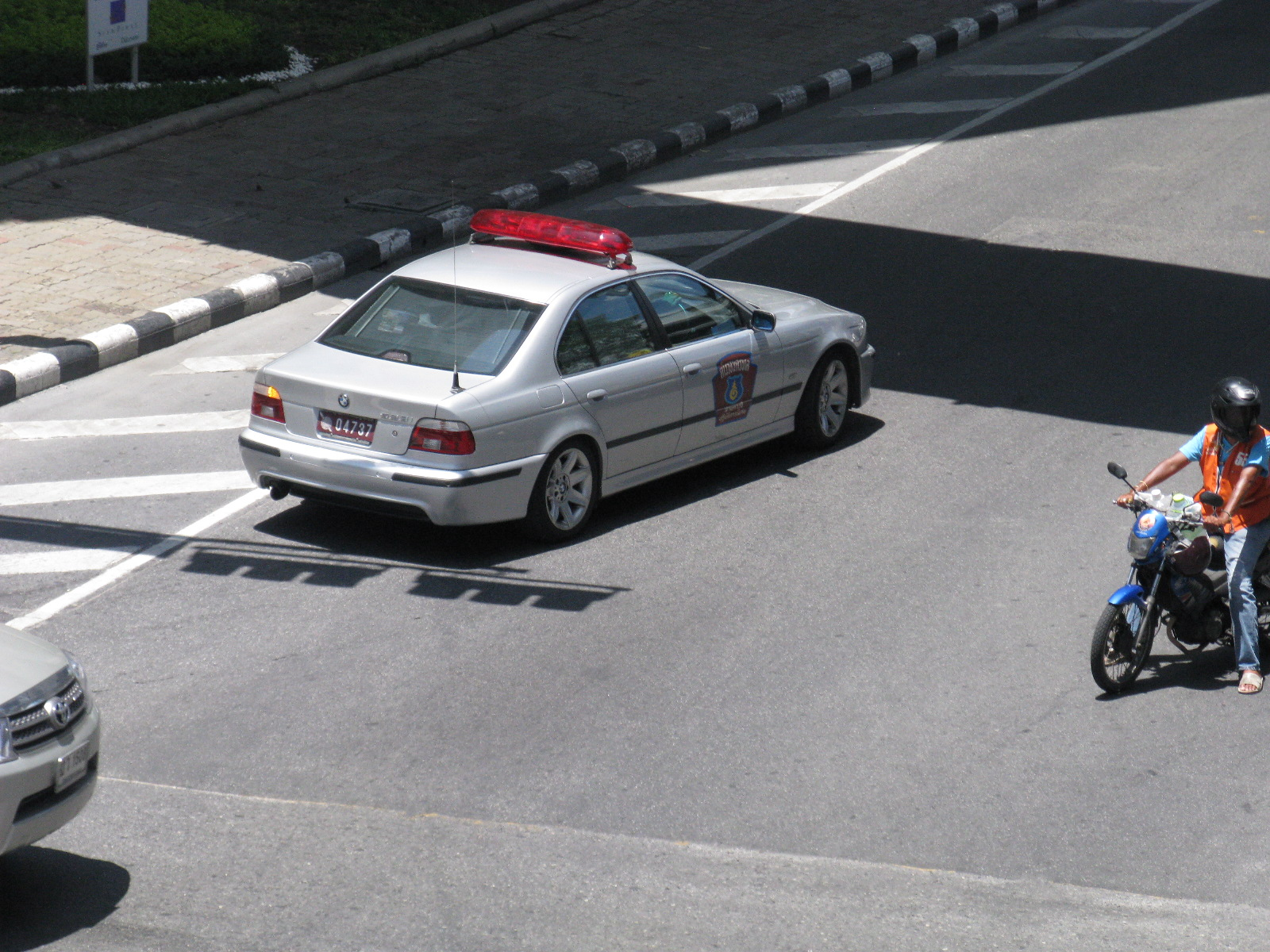
Royal Thai police vehicle

- Constitution of Thailand
- Crime in Thailand
  - Human trafficking in Thailand
- Human rights in Thailand
  - Censorship in Thailand
    - Internet censorship in Thailand
  - LGBT rights in Thailand
  - Freedom of religion in Thailand
- Law enforcement in Thailand
- South Thailand insurgency

=== Military of Thailand ===
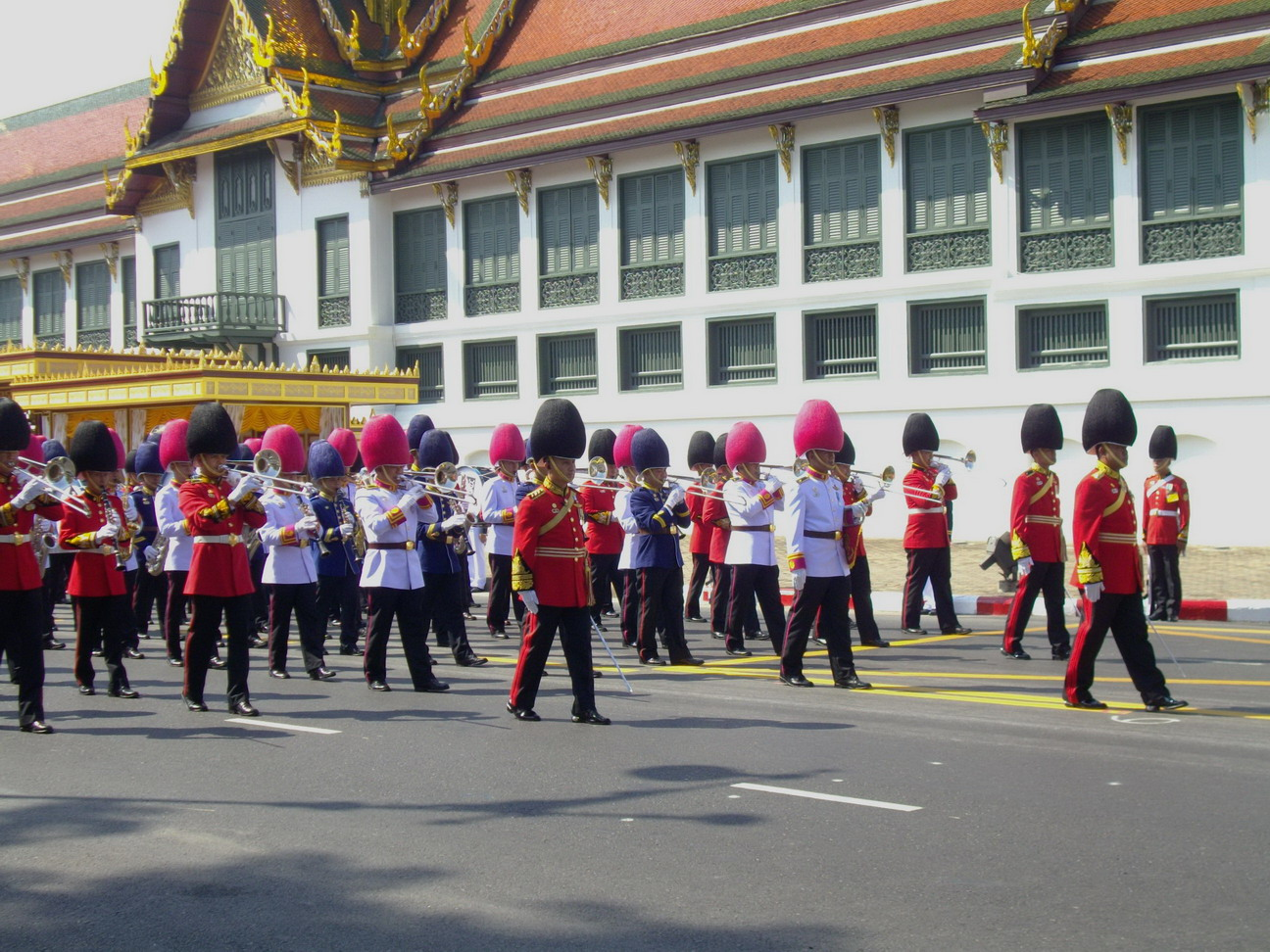
Royal Thai army band in the ceremonial dress marching in front of the Grand Palace

- Command
  - Commander-in-chief:
    - Ministry of Defence of Thailand
- Forces
  - Army of Thailand (more pictures)
  - Navy of Thailand
    - Marine Corps of Thailand
    - Royal Thai Navy SEALs
  - Air Force of Thailand
  - Special forces of Thailand
- Military history of Thailand
- Military ranks of Thailand

== History of Thailand ==
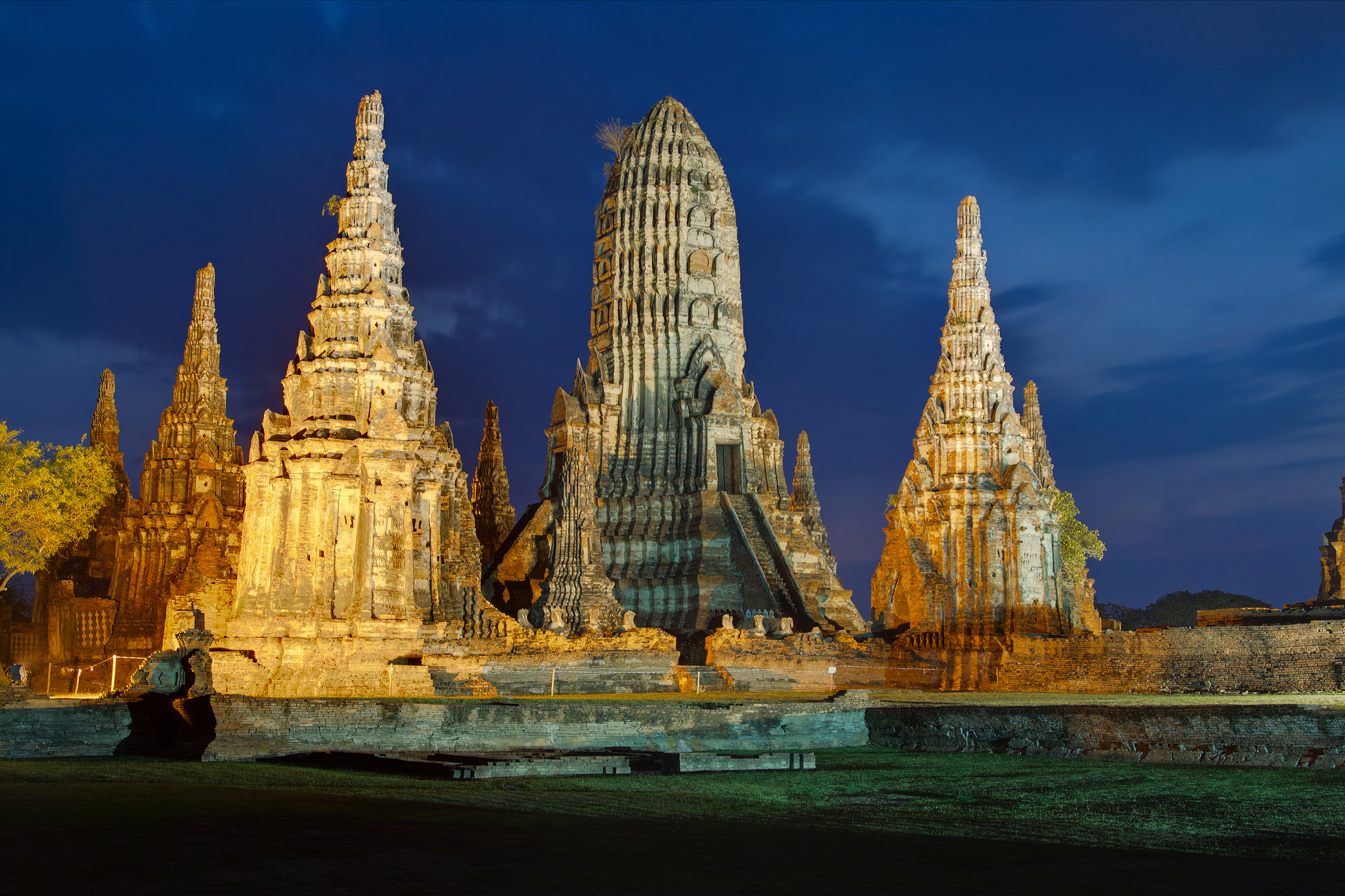
Wat Chaiwatthanaram ruins from Ayutthaya period

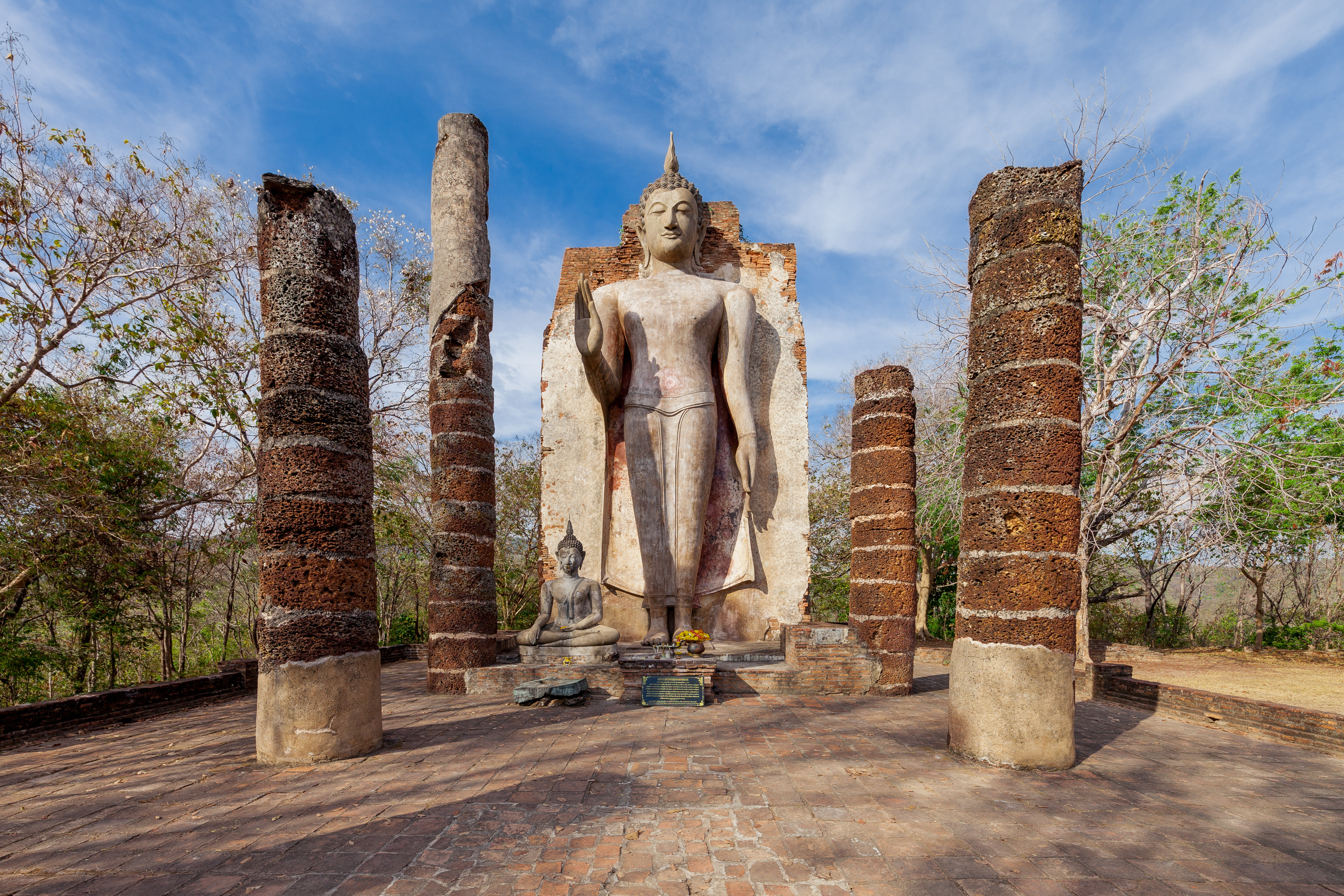
A Leela Buddha statue in the ruins of Wat Saphan Hin in Sukhothai Historical Park, built in Sukhothai period

- Peopling of Thailand

=== By period ===
- Prehistoric Thailand
- Early history of Thailand
- Initial states of Thailand (3 BCE-1238)
  - Suvarnabhumi
  - Dvaravati
  - Lavo
  - Haripuñjaya
  - Singhanavati
  - Pan Pan
  - Raktamaritika
  - Langkasuka
  - Srivijaya
  - Tambralinga
- Sukhothai Kingdom (1238–1448)
- Ayutthaya Kingdom (1351–1767)
- Thonburi Kingdom (1768–1782)
- Rattanakosin Kingdom (1782–1932)
- Kingdom of Thailand
  - History of Thailand (1932–1973)
  - History of Thailand (1973–2001)
  - History of Thailand (2001–present)

=== By region ===
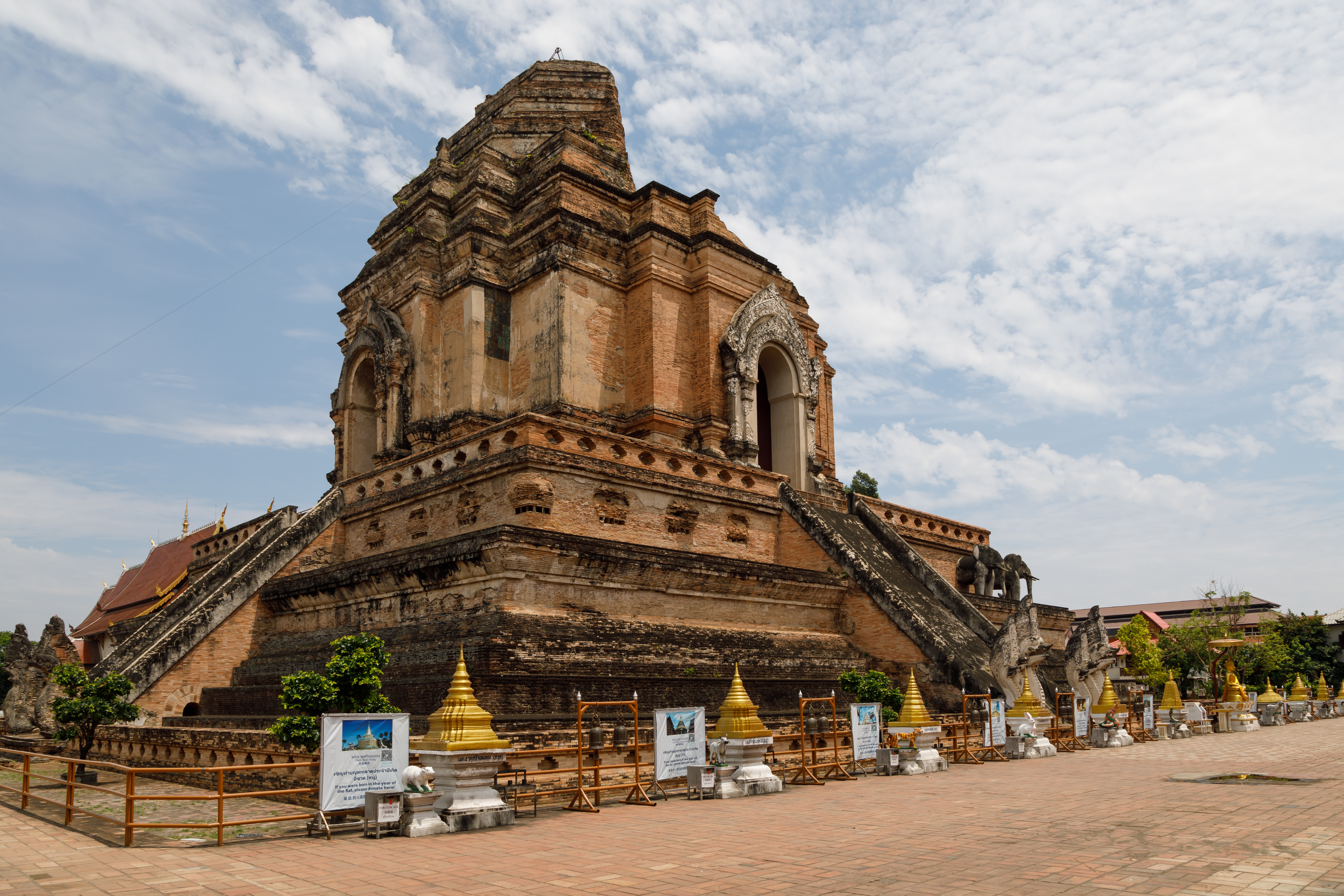
Collapsed chedi of Wat Chedi Luang which was built in Lan Na Kingdom

- Haripuñjaya
- Isan
- Lan Na
- Nakhon Si Thammarat
- Phitsanulok

=== By field ===
- Economic history of Thailand
- Military history of Thailand
  - Japanese Invasion of Thailand
  - United States Air Force in Thailand

== Culture of Thailand ==
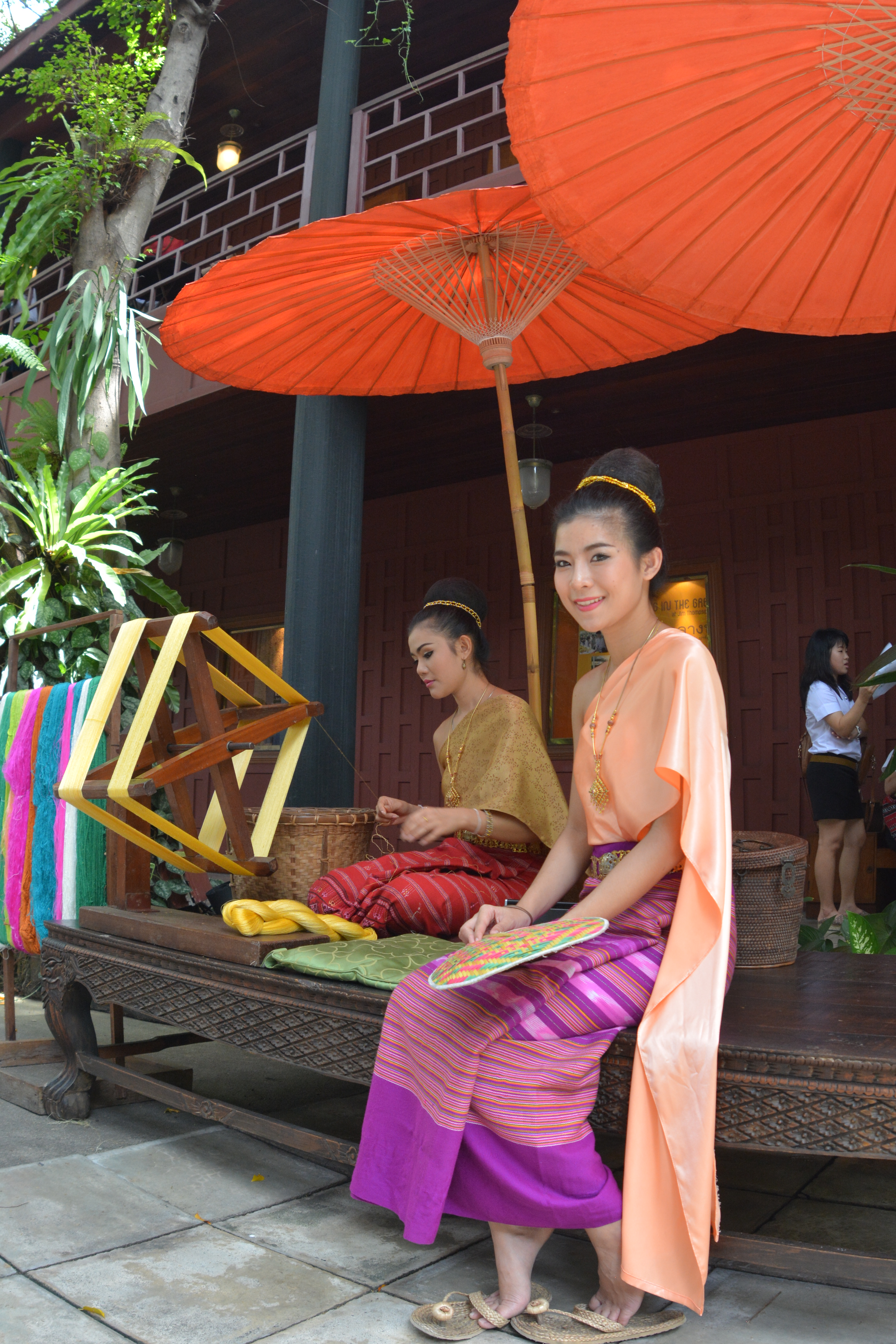
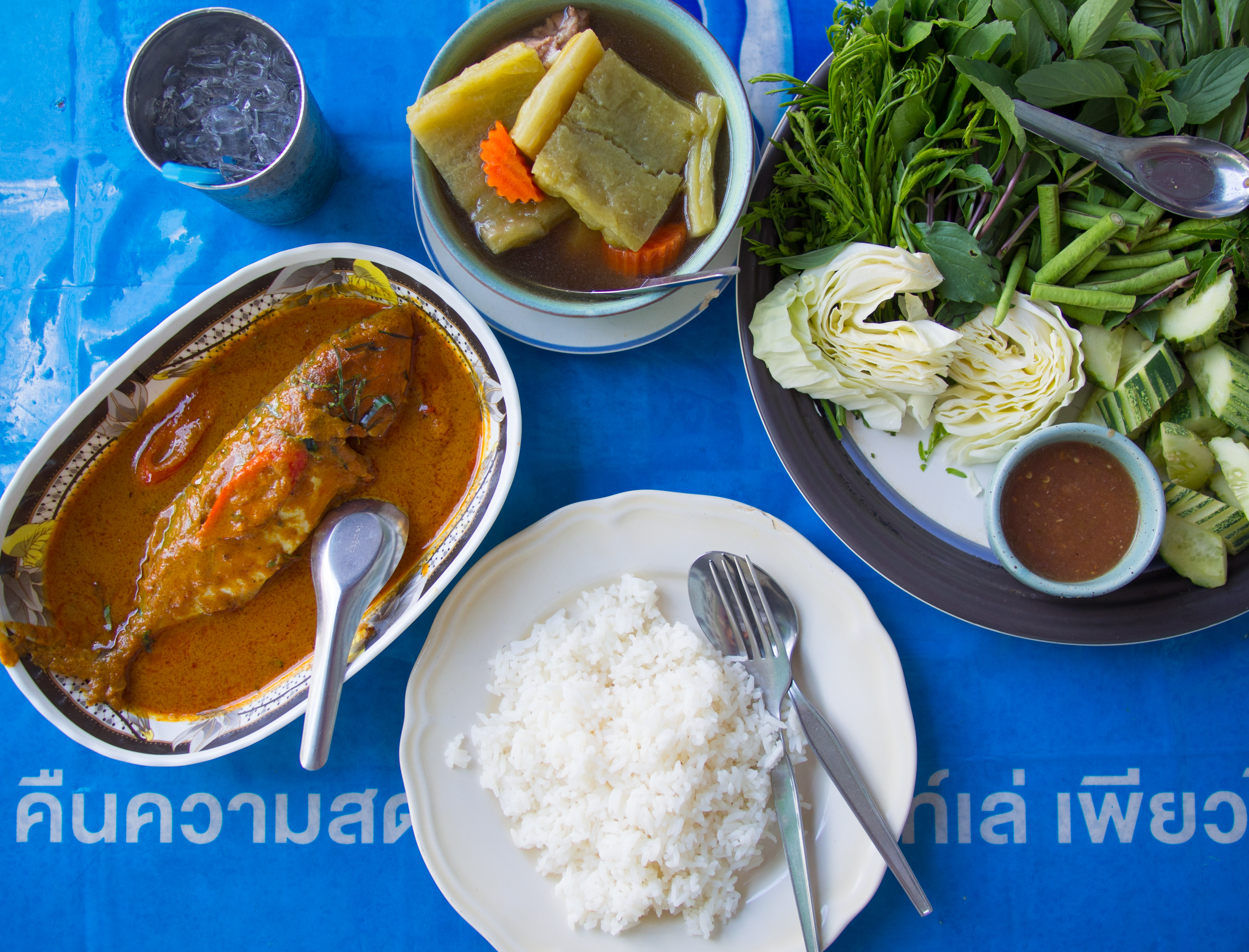
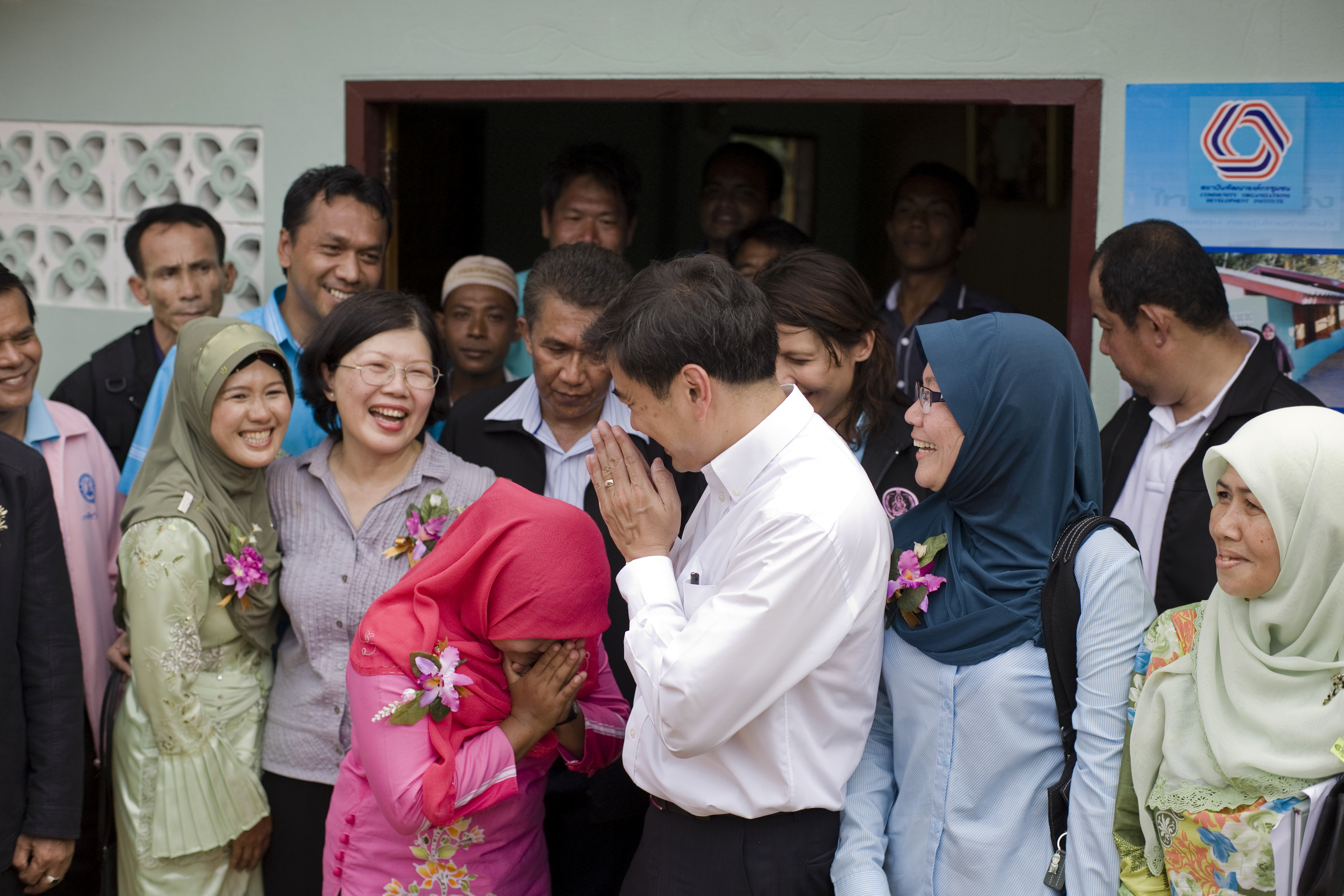
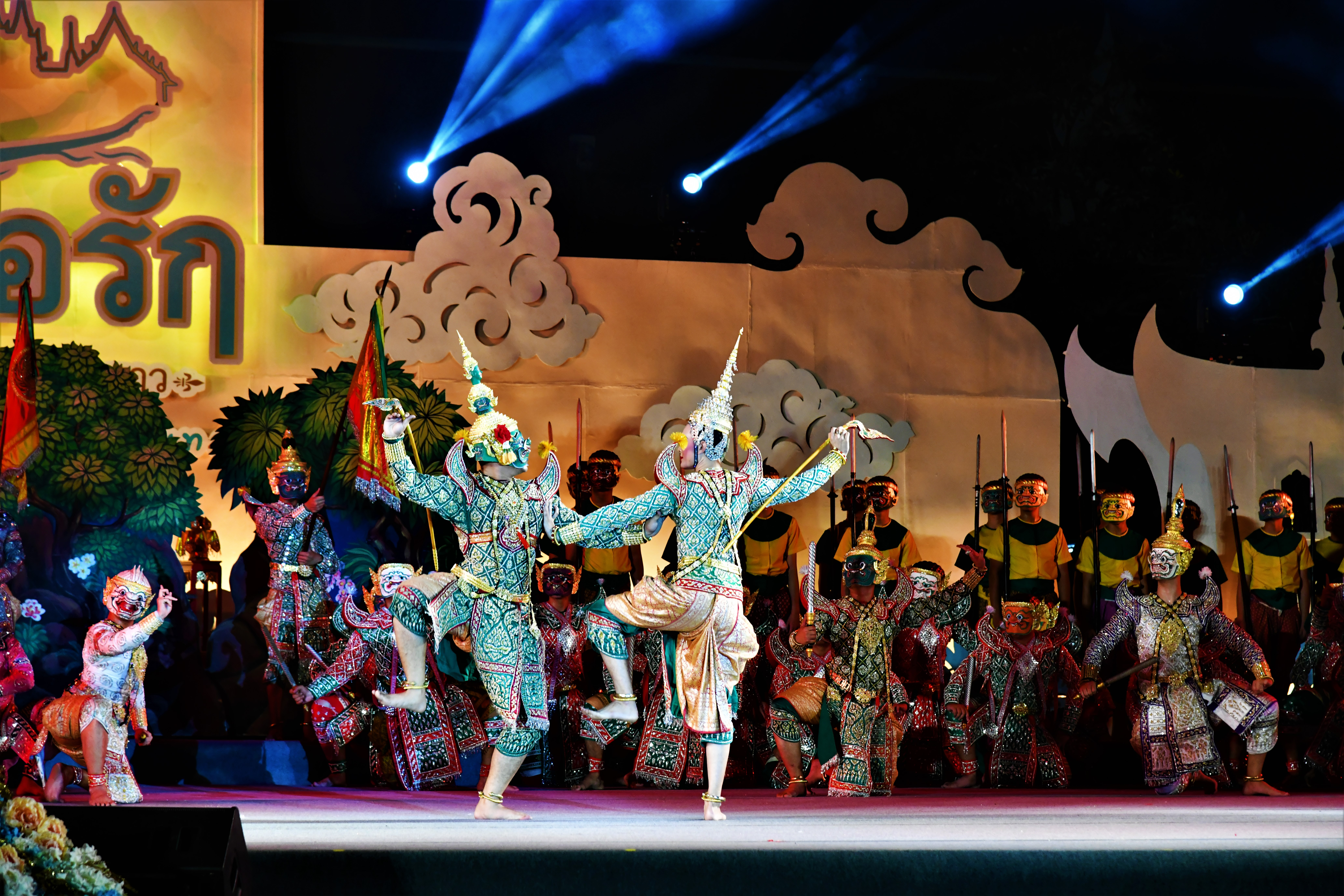
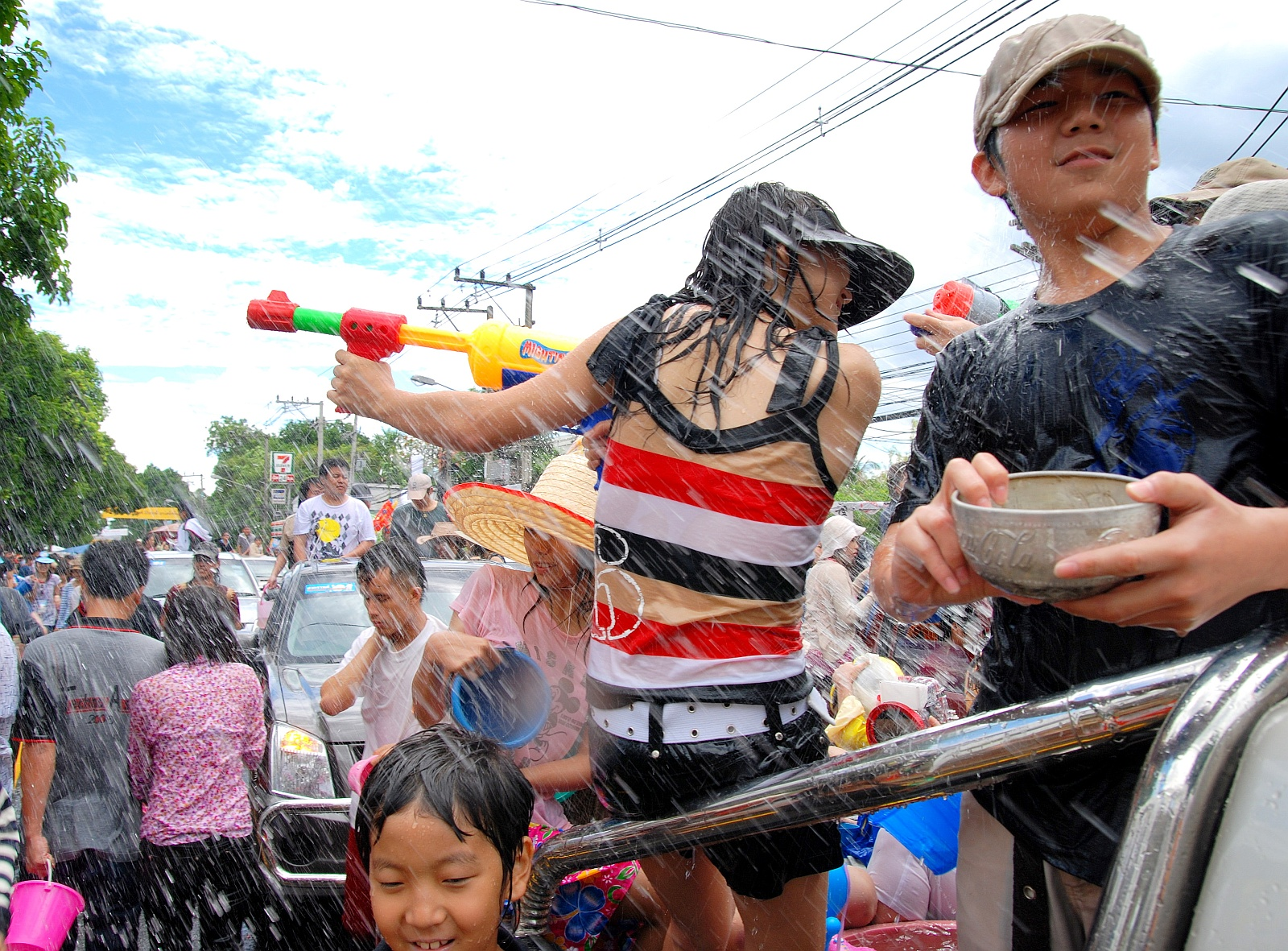
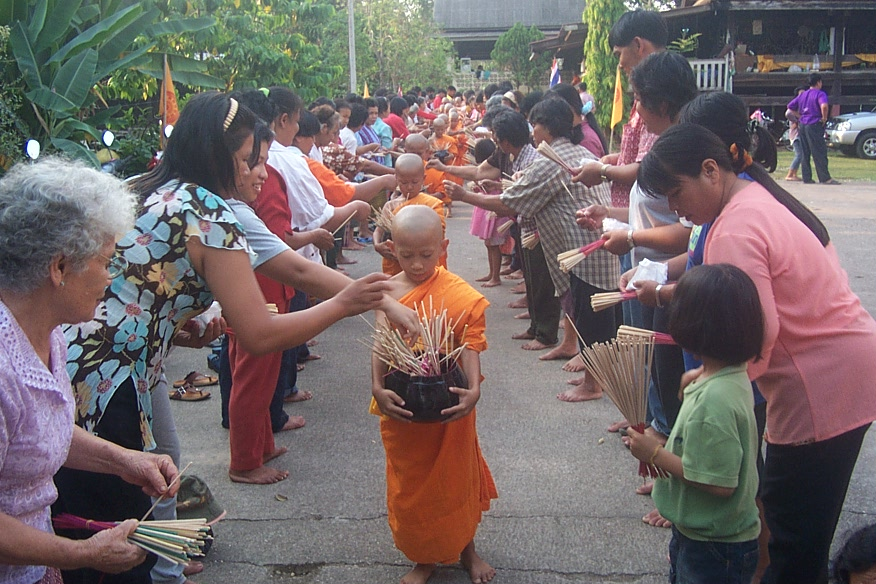
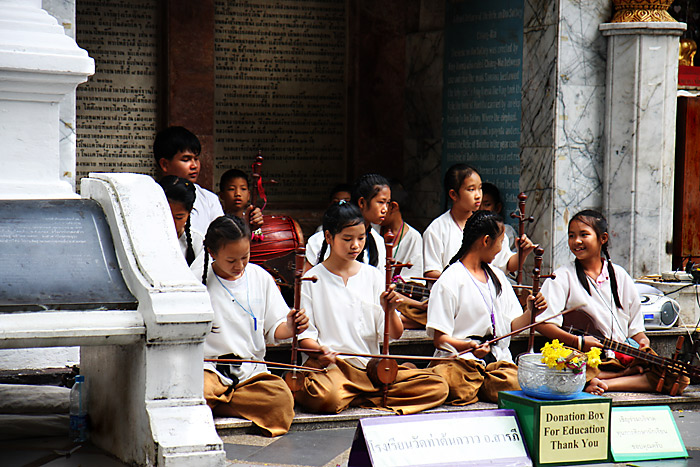
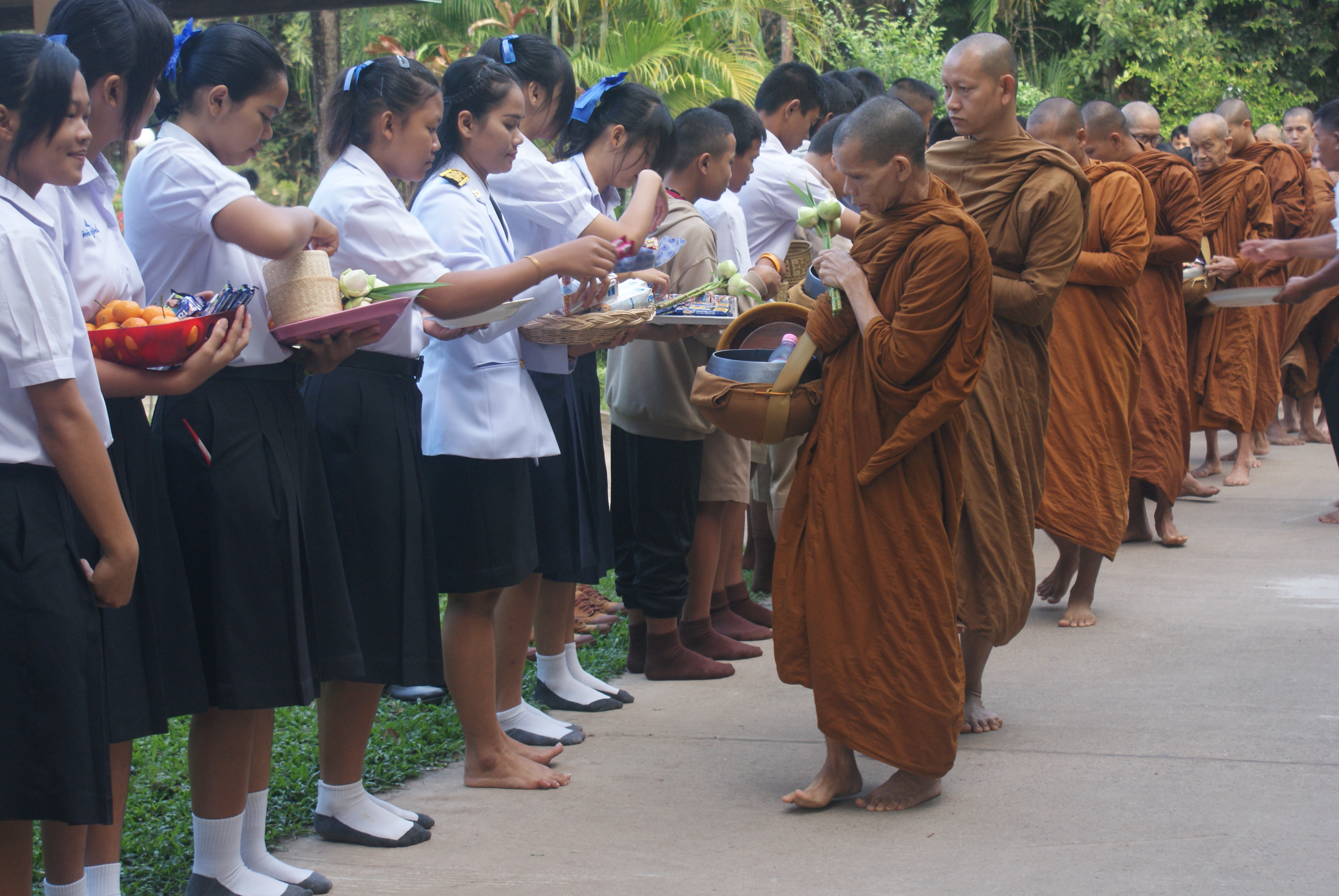
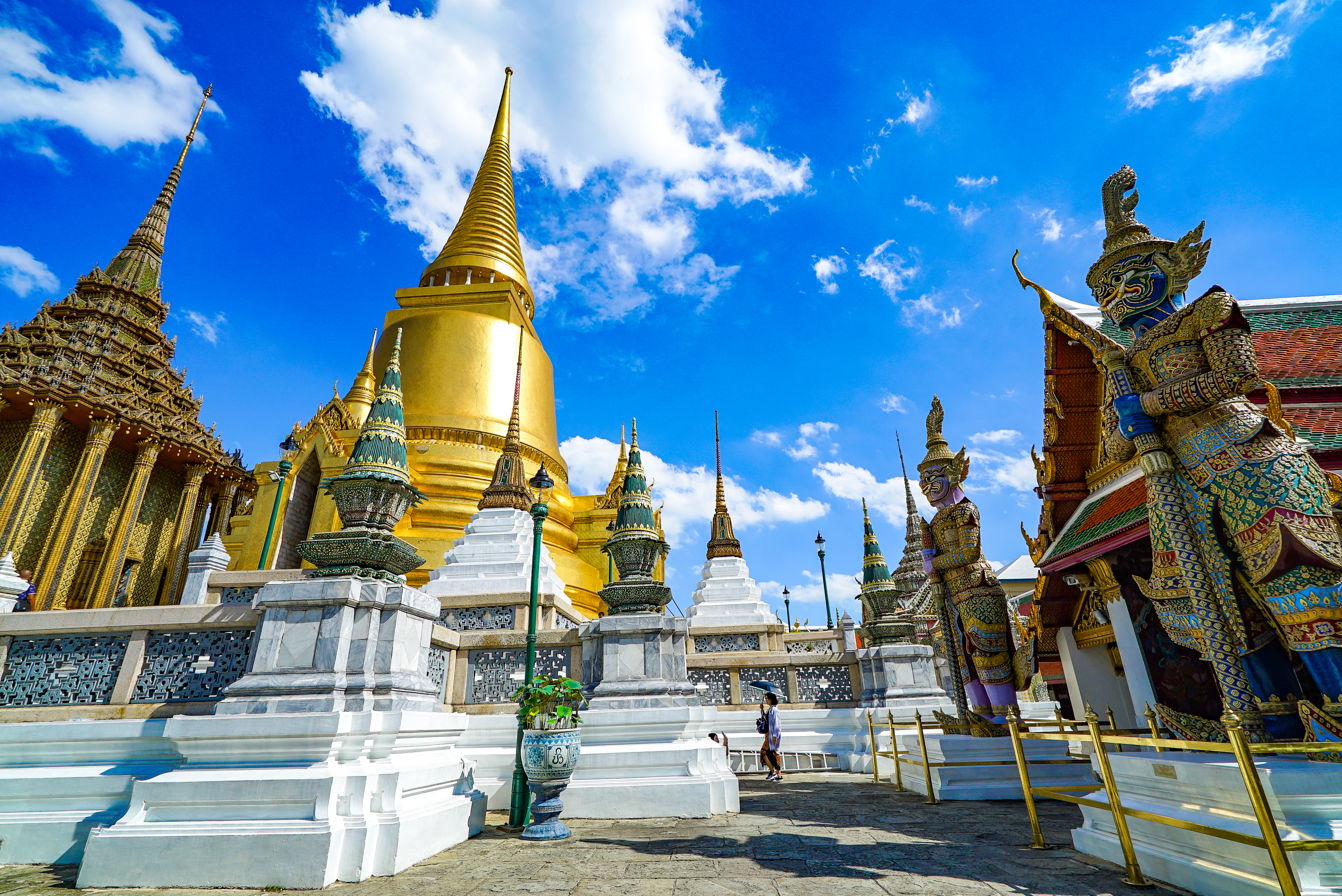
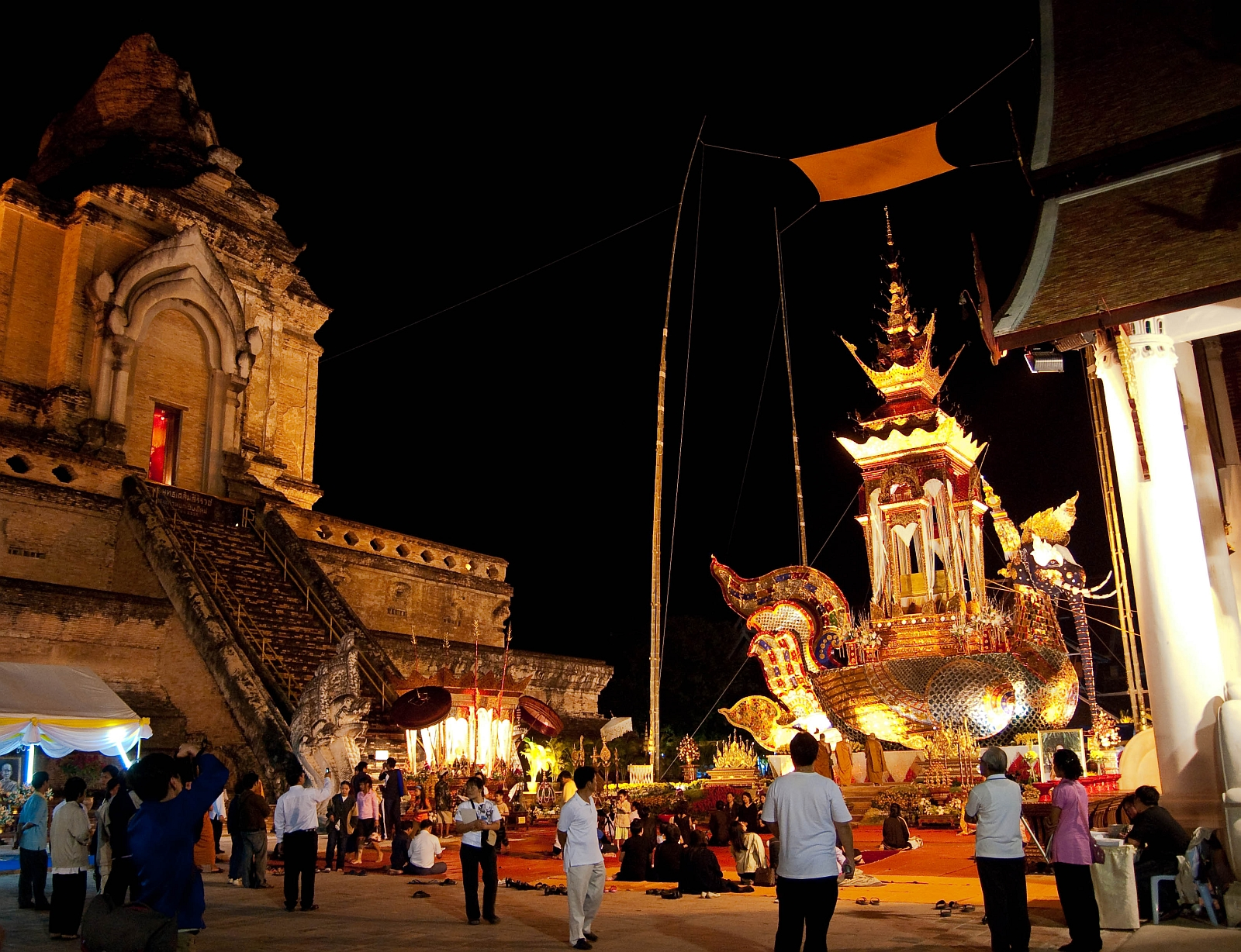
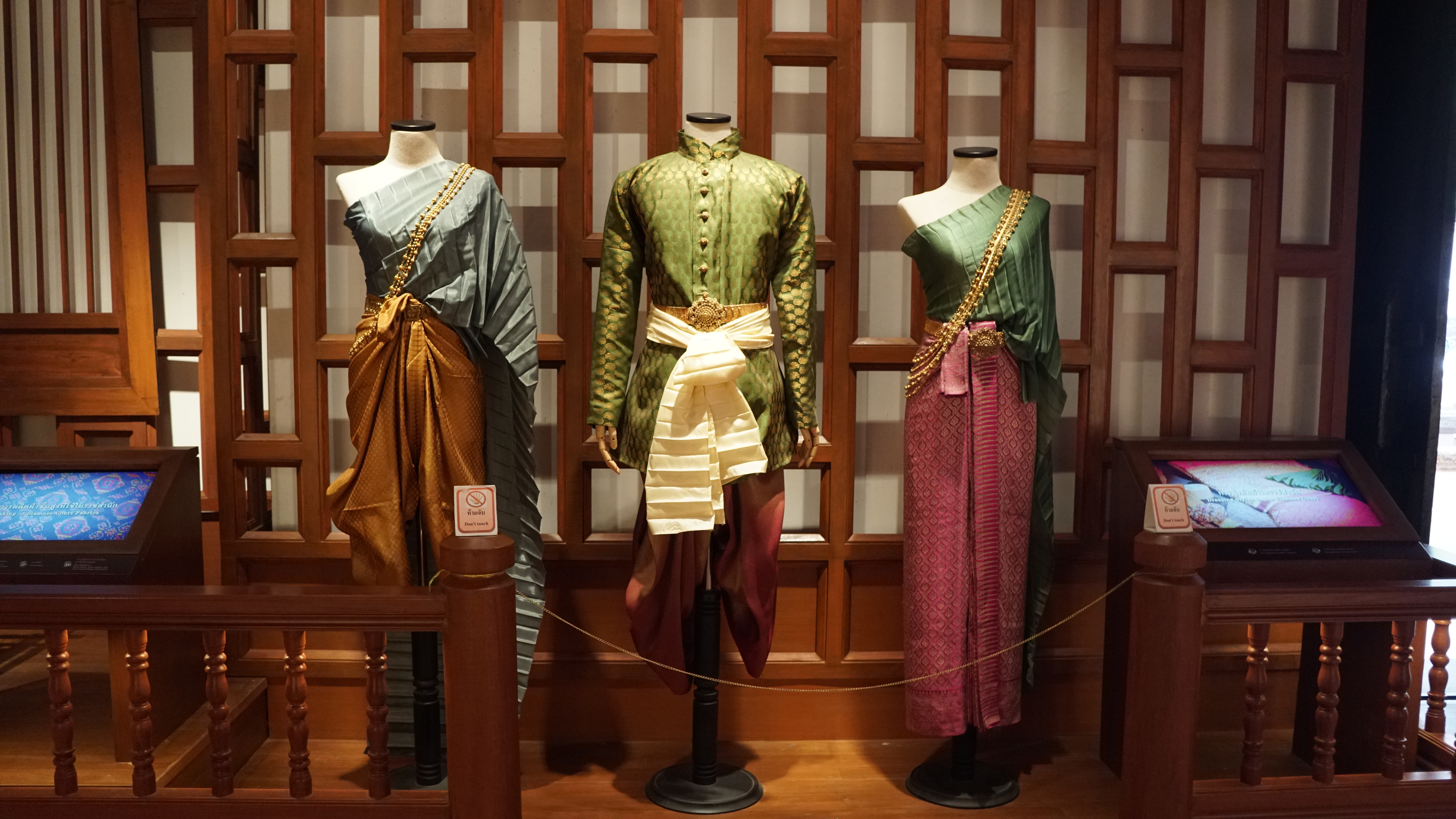
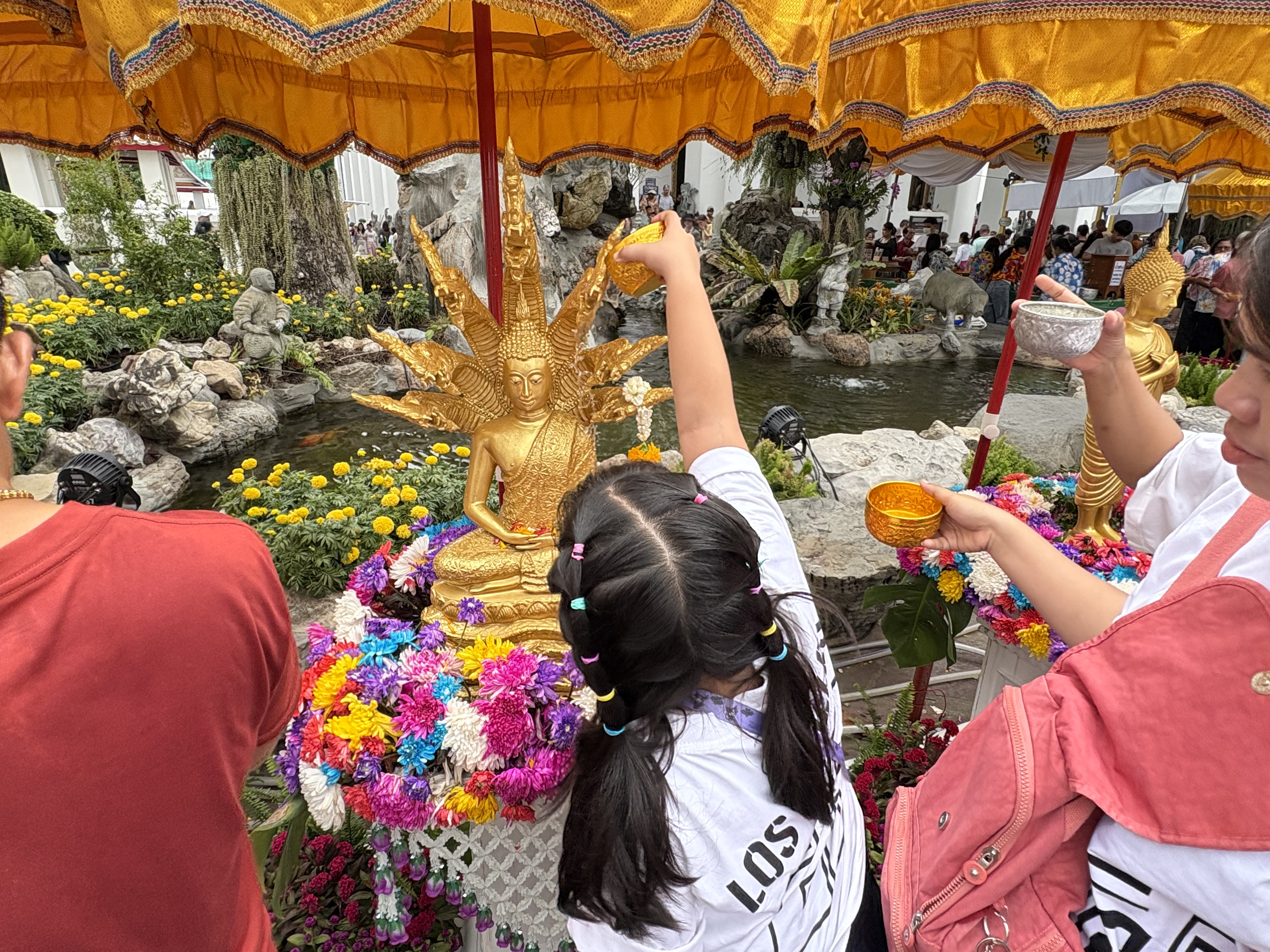
Representative elements of Thai culture. From top, left to right: Thai women wearing sabai at Jim Thompson House, southern Thai dish with nam phrik, Thai greeting, Khon performance, vehicles in Chiang Mai during Songkran, Buddhist novices receiving joss sticks, students playing khrueang sai, students giving alms to Buddhist monks, Wat Phra Kaew, funeral pyre of Chan Kusalo, Thai traditional costumes at Bangkok National Museum, and ritual bathing of a Buddha statue.
- Architecture of Thailand
  - Tallest structures in Thailand
  - Traditional Thai house
- Thai cuisine
- Diving in Thailand
  - Diving sites in Ko Tao
- Etiquette in Thailand
- Festivals in Thailand
- Languages of Thailand
  - Thai script
- Mass media in Thailand
- Museums in Thailand
- National symbols of Thailand
  - Emblem of Thailand
  - Flag of Thailand
  - Thai National Anthem
- Thai people
  - Ethnic groups in Thailand
    - Indians in Thailand
  - Thai names
- Traditional Thai clothing
- Prostitution in Thailand
- Public holidays in Thailand
- Women in Thailand
- World Heritage Sites in Thailand

=== Art in Thailand ===
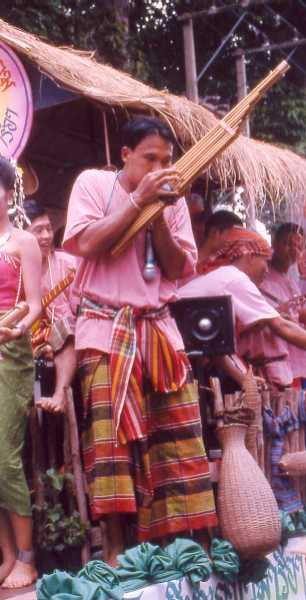
A Khene player wearing sarong and pakhaoma at the Ubol Candle Festival

- Thai temple art and architecture
- Thai Buddhist sculpture
- Thai Buddhist art
- Cinema of Thailand
  - Cinemas in Thailand
  - Films shot in Thailand
- Dance in Thailand
  - Khon
- Thai literature
- Music of Thailand
  - Traditional Thai musical instruments
- Television in Thailand
- Theatre in Thailand
  - Theatres in Bangkok
- Video games in Thailand

=== Religion in Thailand ===
- Buddhism in Thailand
  - Dhammayuttika Nikaya
  - Maha Nikaya
  - List of Buddhist temples in Thailand
  - Sangha Supreme Council
  - Supreme Patriarch of Thailand
- Christianity in Thailand
  - Protestantism in Thailand
- Hinduism in Thailand
- Islam in Thailand
- Sikhism in Thailand

=== Sports in Thailand ===
- Badminton in Thailand
  - Thailand Open
- Boxing in Thailand
- Cricket in Thailand
  - Thailand national cricket team
  - Thailand women's national cricket team
- Cycling in Thailand
- Football in Thailand
  - Football Association of Thailand
  - List of football clubs in Thailand
  - Thai football league system
  - Thailand national football team
- Golf in Thailand
- Ice hockey in Thailand
- Rugby union in Thailand
  - Thailand women's national rugby union team
- Thailand at the Olympics
- Volleyball in Thailand

== Economy and infrastructure of Thailand ==
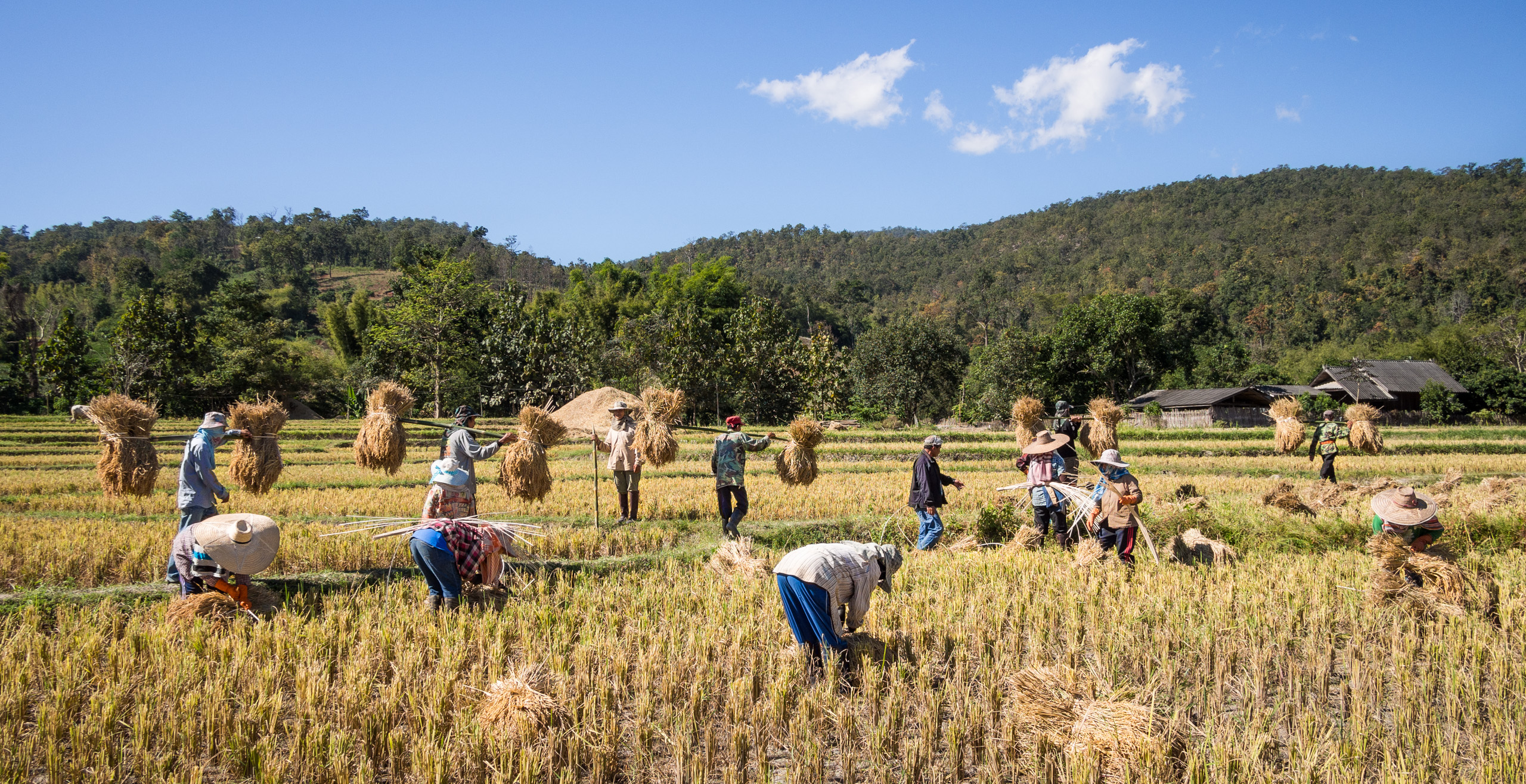
Rice plantations in the rural areas of Chiang Mai

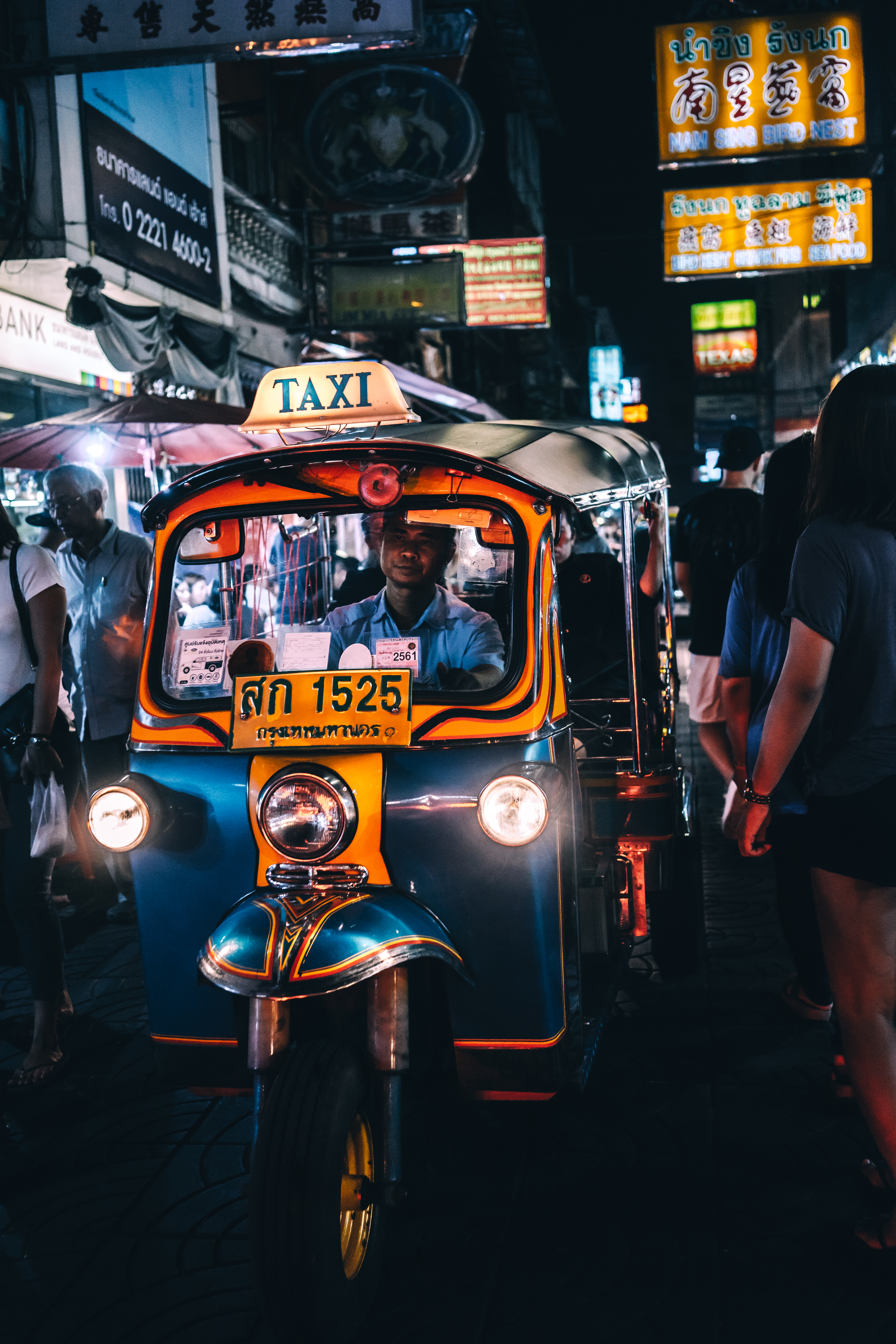
Tuk-tuks are a major form of public transport in Bangkok and other cities in Thailand.

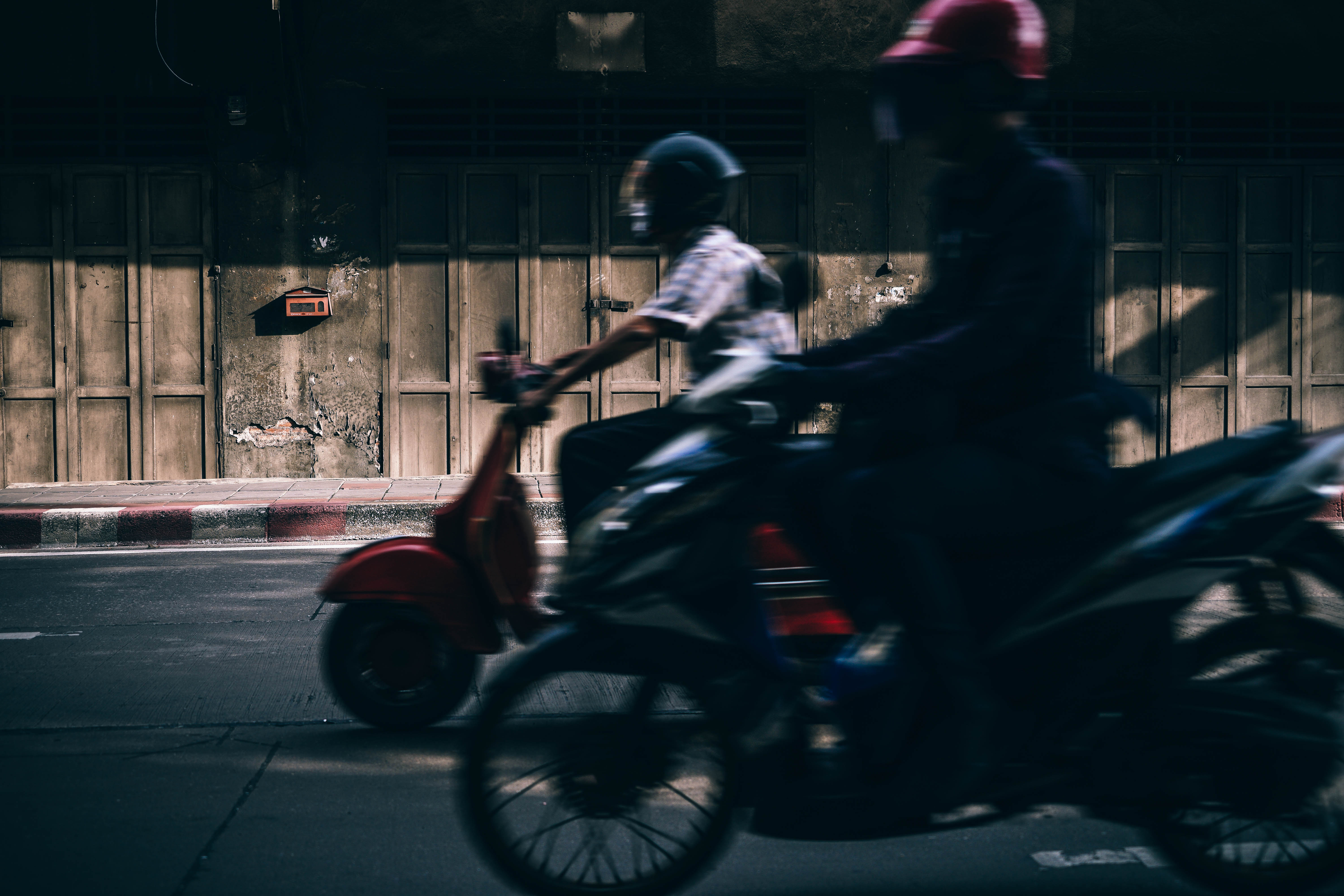
Motorcycles make up 75% of the vehicles in Thailand

- Economic rank, by nominal GDP (2007): 33rd (thirty-third)
- Economic consequences of the 2006 Thai coup d'état
- Agriculture in Thailand
- Banking in Thailand
  - National Bank of Thailand
  - List of banks in Thailand
- Communications in Thailand
  - Internet in Thailand
    - Internet censorship in Thailand
  - Telephone numbers in Thailand
- Companies of Thailand
- Currency of Thailand: Baht
  - ISO 4217: THB
- Economic history of Thailand
- Energy in Thailand
  - Energy policy of Thailand
  - Energy Industry Liberalization and Privatization (Thailand)
- Mining in Thailand
- Oil industry in Thailand
  - Energy Industry Liberalization and Privatization (Thailand)
- Stock Exchange of Thailand
- Thai lottery
- Tourism in Thailand
  - 32.6 million international visitors in 2016
  - 9th most visited country (2016, World Tourism rankings)
- Transport in Thailand (more pictures)
  - Airports in Thailand
    - Airports of Thailand
  - Rail transport in Thailand
    - MRT (Bangkok)
    - BTS skytrain
    - State Railway of Thailand
  - Roads in Thailand
    - Thai motorway network
- Sufficiency economy

== Education in Thailand ==
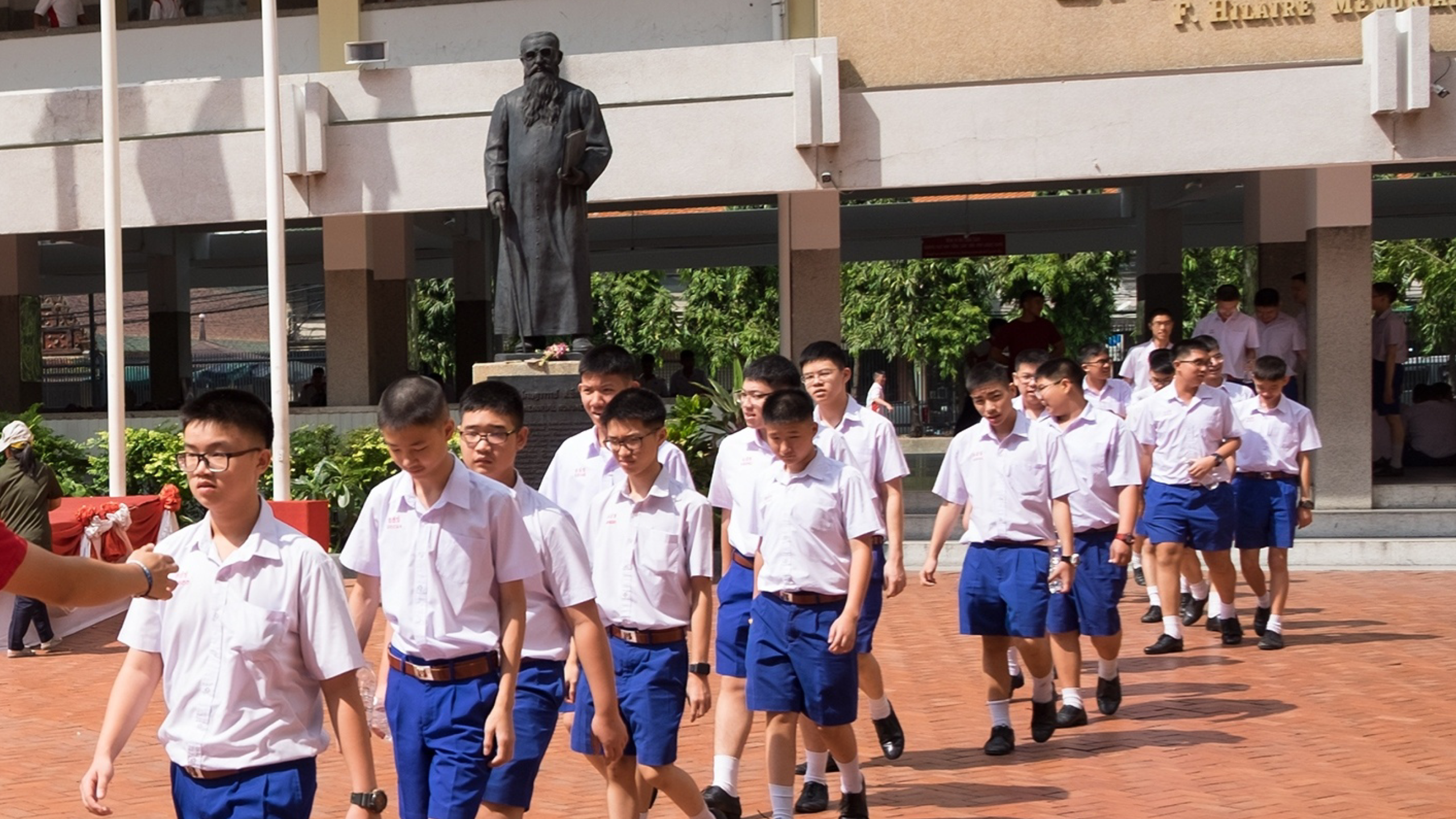
Students of Assumption College Bangkok

- List of schools in Thailand
  - List of schools in Bangkok
  - List of international schools in Thailand
- List of universities in Thailand
  - List of medical schools in Thailand
- Sanam Luang Dhamma Studies

== Health in Thailand ==
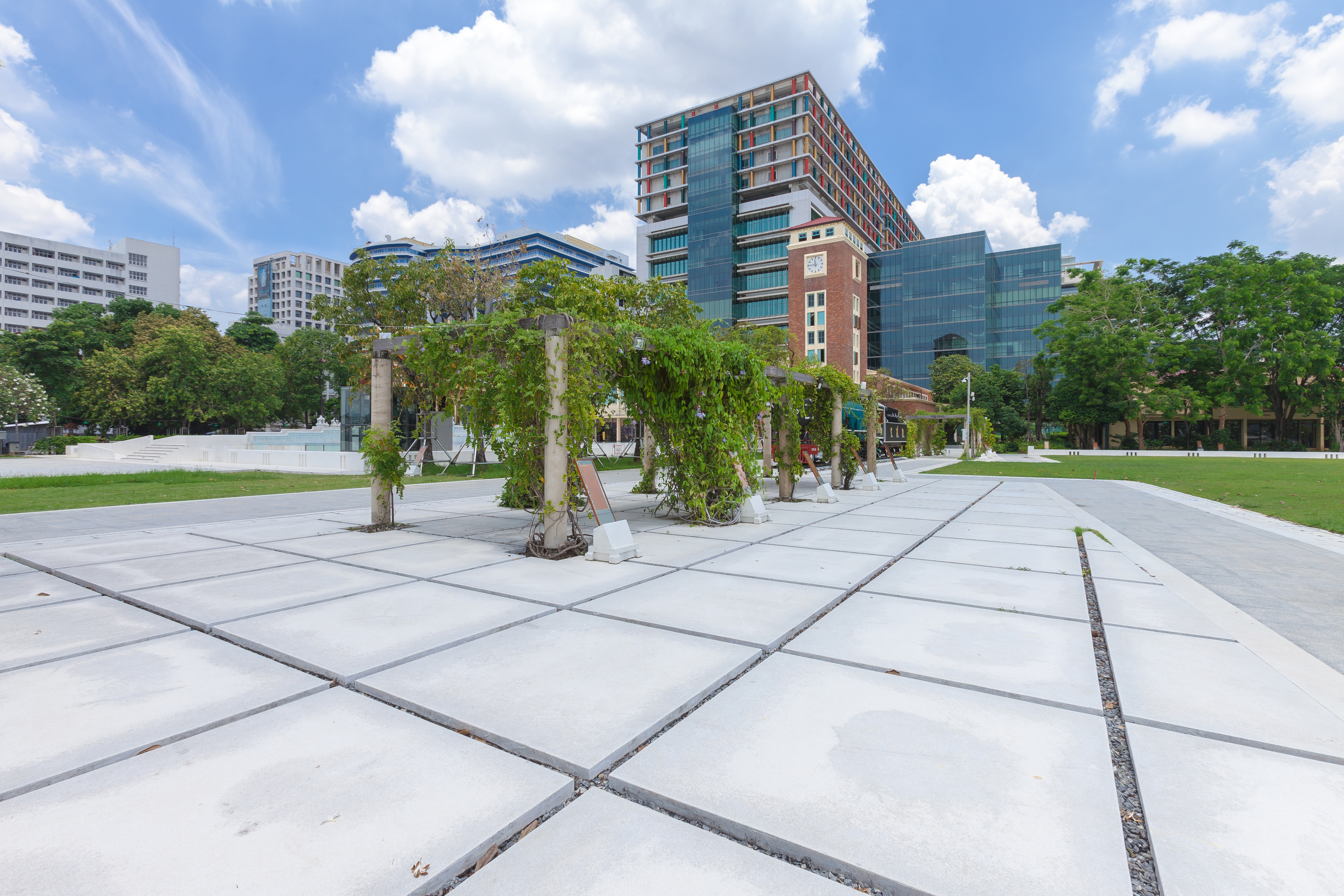
Siriraj Piyamaharajkarun Hospital

- Hospitals in Thailand
  - List of hospitals in Thailand
- Traditional Thai medicine

== See also ==
- List of international rankings
- Member states of the United Nations
- Outline of Asia
- Outline of geography
