= List of volcanoes in Thailand =

This is a list of active, dormant, and extinct volcanoes in Thailand.

Name	Elevation		Location	Last eruption
Name	meters	feet	Coordinates	Last eruption
Phanom Rung (Thai: พนมรุ้ง)	370	1200	14.53°N 102.94°E	-
Doi Pha Khok Hin Fu (Thai: ดอยผาคอกหินฟู)	450	1480	18.249°N 99.626°E	-
