= Early history of Thailand =

The known early history of Thailand begins with the earliest major archaeological site at Ban Chiang. Dating of artifacts from this site is controversial, but there is a consensus that at least by 3600 BCE, inhabitants had developed bronze tools and had begun to cultivate wet rice, providing the impetus for social and political organisation.

Later, Malay, Mon, and Khmer civilisations flourished in the region prior to the domination of the Thais, most notably the kingdom of Srivijaya in the south, the Dvaravati kingdom in central Thailand, and the Khmer Empire based at Angkor.

The Thai are part of a larger ethno-linguistic group known as the Tai, a group which includes the Lao, the people of the Shan region of northeastern Burma, the Zhuang people of Guangxi Province in China and the Thổ people and Nùng people of northern Vietnam. Migrations from southern China to Southeast Asia took place primarily during the first millennium CE, most likely via northern Laos.

During the first millennium CE the Tai peoples were loosely organised in small entities known as muang. They were heavily influenced by the more advanced cultures around them: the Khmer to the east, and the Hindu cultures of India to the west. Most of the Tai were converted to a form of Hinduism, traces of which can still be seen in Thai religious practice today. Between the 6th and 9th centuries CE, Buddhism was introduced into the Tai-speaking lands, probably via Burma, and became the dominant religion. The Theravada Buddhism now practised in Thailand was introduced by missionaries from Sri Lanka in the 13th century.

Phongsawadannuea (Chronicle of the North) is a historical record of this period. The date of its first compilation is unknown, but its content stretches from 500 CE down to the early 11th century. The recent edition was compiled in early Rattanakosin period.

== See also ==
- Initial states of Thailand
- Peopling of Thailand
- Prehistory of Thailand
