= Initial states of Thailand =

Aspect of Thai history

Before the southward migration of the Tai from Guangxi beginning in the 4th century, the Indochinese peninsula was already inhabited by Austronesians, who had spread into all subregions by approximately 30,000 BP. These populations left evidence of an early local culture known as the Hoabinhian, a term applied to a lithic industry and long-term cultural tradition characterised by stone tools and flaked cobble artefacts, which emerged around 10,000 BP in caves and rock shelters. First identified at sites in Hòa Bình, Vietnam, the Hoabinhian was later documented in Terengganu, Malaysia, Sumatra, Thailand, Laos, Myanmar, Cambodia, and Yunnan, southern China.

Austroasiatic Mon and Khmer groups, believed to have originated in northeastern India, predominately populated the riverine lowlands of Indochina from around 5,000 BP. Austronesian migrants later arrived along the coast of what is now central Vietnam around 2,500 BP.

The controversial Two layer hypothesis proposes a later migration of agricultural populations from the Yangtze River valley around 3,000 BP. These groups are thought to have introduced wet-rice and millet farming to mainland Southeast Asia.

The site of Ban Chiang in northeastern Thailand is regarded as the earliest known centre of copper and bronze production in Southeast Asia and has been dated to approximately 2000 BCE.

The earliest known records of a political entity in Indochina are associated with Funan, which was centred in the Mekong Delta and encompassed territories within present-day Thailand. Chinese annals attest to Funan's existence as early as the 1st century CE, while archaeological evidence indicates extensive human settlement in the region since at least the 4th century BCE.

The kingdoms of Langkasuka and Tambralinga on the Malay Peninsula appear in Chinese sources by the 5th century CE. Alongside Funan, these polities are commonly described as Indianized kingdoms, having adopted elements of Indian culture, religion, political organisation, administration, epigraphy, literature, and architecture following centuries of trade and socio-economic interaction with the Indian subcontinent.

The Mon Dvaravati principalities emerged during the middle of the first millennium CE in the lower Chao Phraya River valley of present-day central Thailand. Unlike Funan, Langkasuka, and Tambralinga, which were situated within the international trade network, Dvaravati remained comparatively isolated. Despite this, Mon–Dvaravati culture developed a sophisticated artistic and religious tradition rooted in Hindu cosmology. Distinctive stylistic features, such as the faceted mitre positioned high on the forehead and characteristic facial features—particularly the eyes—have continued to influence Thai sculpture.

== Indigenous states theory ==
In contrast to theories that emphasise migration from southern China, some scholars propose an Indigenous States theory. This perspective argues that a number of indigenous polities were capable of absorbing external political and cultural influences while developing their own distinct cultural identities.

Earlier studies of early Thai history were often shaped by the assumption that both the origins and development of early states were primarily the result of Indian influence. These influences were considered central to the formation of early Thai states as unified political entities exercising territorial control across large parts of the Indochinese peninsula. This view was sometimes extended to the belief that the populations of these states were uniformly of Mon descent.

Proponents of the Indigenous States theory argue that such interpretations overlook the existence of indigenous societies that already possessed their own political and cultural systems. Although diverse and numerous, these systems were both autonomous and well developed. According to this view, interaction and exchange among these groups contributed to the emergence of shared cultural patterns prior to the introduction of Indian influences.

The development of early centres such as Suvarnabhumi (Thai: U-Thong; Chinese: Chinlin) and Funan from local communities into coastal hubs is attributed to economic and cultural interaction with seafarers from the South China Sea and the Indian Ocean. These maritime contacts introduced new techniques and artefacts to settlements throughout Southeast Asia and played a significant role in the transformation of populated centres into early states.

During the 2nd to 6th centuries CE, these centres became focal points of trade and cultural exchange and maintained links with maritime networks in Southeast Asia. In addition to Suvarnabhumi and Funan, Chinese historical sources record the existence of states such as Tun Sun, Tan-Tan, and Pan Pan, as well as later polities including Chi Tu, Lang-Jia-Shu, To-Lo-Po-Ti, and Lo-Hu.

These textual accounts correspond with archaeological discoveries in the region, including Roman lamps, copper coins of Victorinus, etched beads, and enamelled beads. Such artefacts are commonly interpreted as evidence of long-distance trade networks linking eastern and western regions.

== Empire of the South Sea ==
By the 6th century, mariners had learned to exploit the prevailing monsoon winds and to navigate through the Strait of Malacca, significantly shortening sea routes to East Asia. This development brought mariners from the Gulf of Thailand into direct competition with seafarers operating in the Java Sea, who were already engaged in long-distance trade from several major ports. During this period, the relative importance of Suvarnabhumi declined, while the Malay Peninsula and the Indonesian archipelago increased in strategic and commercial significance, contributing to the emergence of what is described as the "Empire of the South Sea".

This expanding maritime network extended across Sumatra, Java, and Sri Lanka. The region formed by these lands and surrounding seas became the commercial and economic foundation of Srivijaya as a maritime power.

Early coastal states continued to expand both territorially and inland, where they encountered societies with established and diverse cultural traditions. Their influence extended into the hinterlands of the Chao Phraya basin. Some historical sources suggest that the "Empire of the South Sea" exercised military power over parts of the mainland. For example, Tambralinga is recorded as having invaded Lavo or Dvaravati in 903.

Records also mention rulers associated with Haribhunjaya, including King Bakaraj (Drabaka), King Ujajitachakravard, and Javaka Raja of Tambralinga. According to chronicles of the Song dynasty, the polity known as San-Fo-Shih sent tribute to the Chinese court in 961 on the orders of King Che-Li-Wu-Ye. The envoy reportedly stated that the name of their kingdom was Xian-Lo-Gua.

== Economy ==
The introduction of new techniques and the consolidation of early Thai polities influenced agricultural production. Water buffaloes were adopted as beasts of burden in place of oxen, a practice well suited to wet-rice cultivation. As a result, rice production increased and became the economic foundation for community development. Agricultural surplus supported the emergence of locally organised economic systems and contributed to the growth of political and economic influence over neighbouring states.

Although maritime trade through the Strait of Malacca had been significant since the 6th century, overland routes connecting coastal towns in southern Myanmar with port towns in central Thailand remained important until the early Rattanakosin period. Alongside the rice trade, the kingdoms of Sukhothai, Ayutthaya, and Rattanakosin functioned as key trans-peninsular trade corridors, operating in parallel with maritime routes through the Strait of Malacca.

== Population ==
Population movements and migrations significantly shaped the cultural traditions and lifestyles of the peoples who came to inhabit the region that later became the Kingdom of Thailand. The historical population included a combination of indigenous groups, such as Proto-Malay, Mon, Khmer, and Champa, as well as migrants from the Indian subcontinent. In addition, coastal communities, maritime populations, Chinese settlers, and numerous other minority groups contributed to the demographic composition of the region. This diversity has been described as a defining characteristic of Thai society.

Thai society and culture historically extended beyond the territorial boundaries of the state. The term Tai peoples refers collectively to a broad group of ethnolinguistic communities in southern China and Southeast Asia who speak Tai languages and share related cultural traditions and festivals, including Songkran. These groups are distributed across a wide area, extending from Hainan to eastern India and from southern Sichuan to present-day Thailand. Although these peoples never formed a single unified nation-state, they historically shared a loosely defined concept of a "Siam" identity, rendered in some regions as Shan or Assam. Many groups self-identify as "Tai".

A more comprehensive enumeration of Tai groups exists in Thai-language sources. For example, the Thai-language classification used in the People's Republic of China identifies 29 ethnic groups and languages as "Tai". Notable Tai groups include:

- The Lao of Laos and northeastern Thailand
- The Northern Thai (Lanna or Thai Yuan) of Thailand
- The Thai of Thailand (Tai Noi, or Little Tai)
- The Shan (Tai Yai, or Big Tai) of Burma
- The Zhuang of China
- The Buyei of China
- The Thai Lue of Laos and China (also known as Dai)
- The Nùng of China, Laos, Thailand, and Vietnam
- The Black Tai (Tai Dam) of Laos and Vietnam
- The Red Tai (Tai Daeng)
- The White Tai (Tai Kao)
- The Tai Dom people of present-day northern Vietnam
- Various Tai-speaking groups in Yunnan, China

== Society ==
Early Thai society was characterised by a fundamental division between rulers and the ruled. During this formative period, significant changes occurred in local political and social organisation. Systems of chiefdom, led by a chief, were gradually replaced by forms of divine kingship influenced by Indian political models. The king, together with the royal aristocracy and bureaucratic nobility, exercised primary political and economic authority.

Below the ruling elite was an upper stratum composed of statesmen and high-ranking officials responsible for administering the state and implementing royal policies. At the local level, community leaders played an intermediary role, maintaining close interaction with the general population.

Beneath these groups were the broader population, the majority of whom were either free persons or slaves. Within this hierarchical system, individuals occupied clearly defined social positions, with corresponding duties and obligations toward those above and below them. Free individuals were typically clients or retainers of members of the upper strata, while slaves were considered the property of elite individuals or households.

Most free people were engaged in agriculture, although townspeople and traders also emerged, reflecting the state's position along both overland and maritime trade routes. Archaeological evidence indicating extensive commercial activity supports the view that these societies developed into significant centres of trade within Southeast Asia.

== Religion ==
The development of early Thai states was accompanied by a gradual shift from local animistic and shamanistic practices toward a predominantly Buddhist cultural framework. Buddhism became a central religious tradition in early Thai society, contributing to the integration of diverse beliefs and ways of life in the region and influencing political organisation. The faith was recognised by both the state and the general population and played an important role in shaping elite ideology and governance.

Within this context, the king was regarded not only as the principal patron of Buddhism but also as a Dharmikaraja, a ruler whose legitimacy derived from adherence to the Buddhist moral order (dharma). This concept emphasised the ruler's responsibility to uphold righteousness and promote the spread of the faith, alongside the exercise of political and military authority.

Monks fulfilled religious functions that were closely connected to the needs of the wider population. They provided instruction in reading and writing and taught Buddhist doctrine. In contrast, Brahmin priests maintained direct ties with the royal court through their ceremonial and ritual roles. Hermits and mendicants often lived in forested areas, although some exercised varying degrees of influence over politically powerful individuals.

The consolidation of Buddhism during the formative period of early Thai states laid the foundations for a Buddhist society and polity in the region and provided the historical basis for the later development of the Kingdom of Thailand.

== See also ==
- Early history of Thailand
- Lavo
- Tambralinga
- Raktamaritika
- Javaka
