= Lampang volcanic belt =

Volcano in Thailand

Lampang
- Location within Thailand

Highest point
- Elevation: 450 m (1,480 ft)
- Prominence: 80 m (260 ft)
- Coordinates: 18.3°N 99.6°E

Geography
- Location: Lampang province, Thailand

Geology
- Mountain type: Volcano
- Last eruption: 0.64–0.95 MYA

The Lampang volcanic belt is a geological feature in Lampang, northern Thailand.

== Geology ==
It consists of volcanic rocks distributed between the Permian and Triassic in an area north of Lampang province. Two main belts of exposed dacitic to rhyolitic lava flows and tuffs form the northeast-trending volcanic belt. This feature joins the Lincang–Jinghong volcanic belt to the north. Geologists interpret the belts as being formed at the subduction zone of a Mid-Triassic convergent boundary.

== Features ==
At Phichai, Mueang Lampang district, lava flows dating back to the Pleistocene can be found. A prominent crater named Phu Khao Fai Doi Pha Khok Hin Fu is located at 18.247°N 99.627°E. The crater is densely vegetated and is 200 meters in diameter. It rises 80 meters above the flat topography, and has an elevation of 450 meters. Basaltic lava flows are present, covering an area of 120 km^{2}. Two other less prominent features; Cham Pa Daet (18.271°N 99.626°E) and Sop Supap are also volcanic craters. The volcano formed due to the movement of magma rising through a fault in the continental crust. Phu Khao Fai Doi Pha Khok Hin Fu consists of two craters; the first is an older, outer crater which was partially destroyed during an eruption. A new crater formed after the eruption. The remnant of the older crater is located in the southeast. Cham Pa Daet rises approximately 180 meters from the plain and has a crater of up to 80 meters wide.
