= Economy of Thailand =

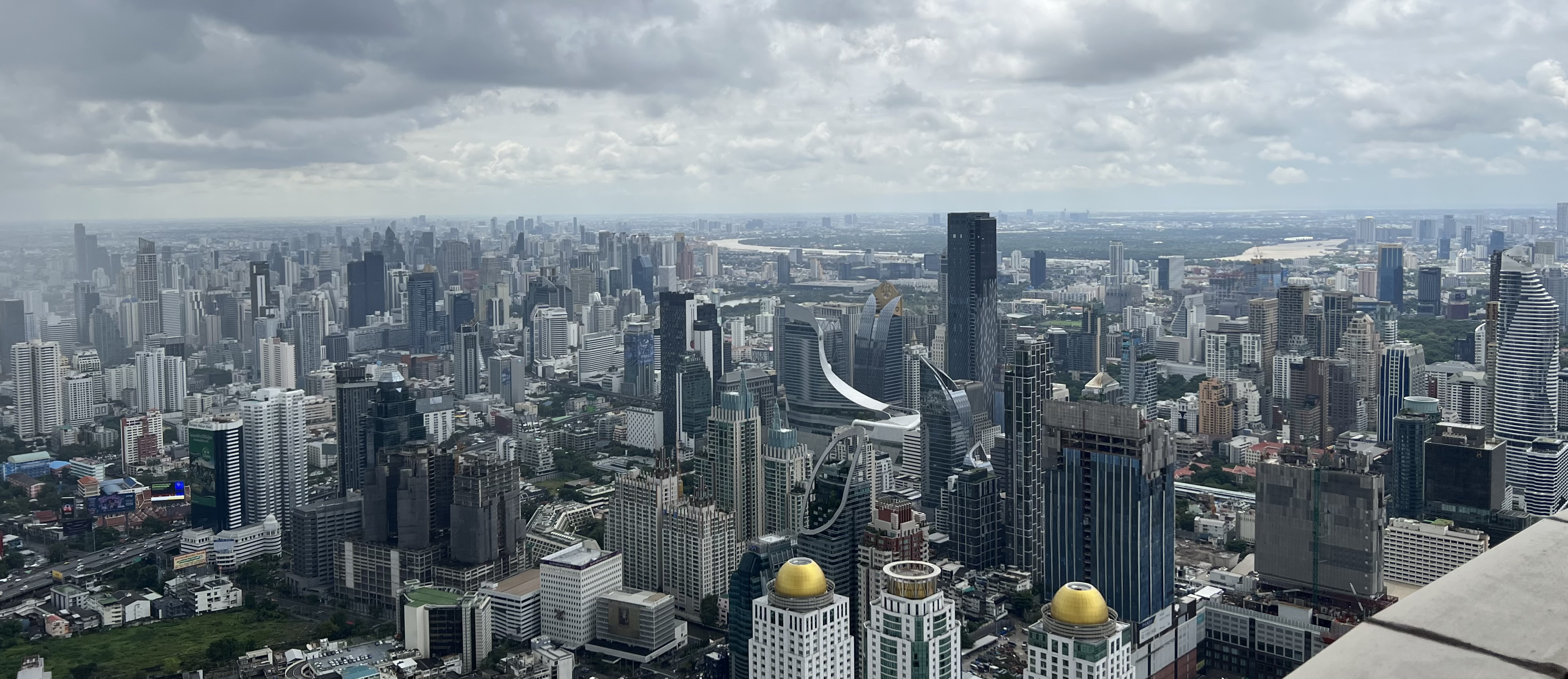
- Bangkok, the commercial hub of Thailand
- Currency: Thai baht (THB, ฿)
- Fiscal year: 1 October – 30 September
- Trade organisations: WTO, APEC, IOR-ARC, ASEAN, RCEP
- Country group: Developing/Emerging; Upper-middle income economy; Newly industrialized country

Statistics
- Population: ▲71,688,011 (2024)
- GDP: ▲$599.11 billion (nominal; 2026 est.); ▲$1.98 trillion (PPP; 2026 est.)
- GDP rank: 31st (nominal; 2026); 24th (PPP; 2026)
- GDP growth: 2.4% (2025); 2.0% (2026 forecast)
- GDP per capita: ▲$8,372 (nominal; 2026 est.); ▲$27,724 (PPP; 2026 est.)
- GDP per capita rank: 100th (nominal; 2026); 75th (PPP; 2026)
- GDP per capita growth: 2.6% (2024)
- GDP by sector: Agriculture: 8.7%; Industry: 31.3%; Services: 60.2%; (2025)
- Inflation (CPI): −0.14% (2025)
- Population below national poverty line: ▲9.9% (2018); ▲8.6% on less than $5.50/day (2018)
- Gini coefficient: ▼34.9 medium (2019, World Bank)
- Human Development Index: ▼0.798 high (2023) (76th); ▼0.681 medium IHDI (61st) (2022)
- Labour force: ▲38,917,441 (2019); ▲67.3% employment rate (2018)
- Unemployment: 1.1% (2020 est.)
- Average gross salary: ฿15,352 / US$437 monthly
- Average net salary: ฿14,505 / US$413 monthly
- Main industries: Automobiles and automotive parts (11%), financial services (9%), electric appliances and components (8%), tourism (6%), cement, auto manufacturing, heavy and light industries, appliances, computers and parts, furniture, plastics, textiles and garments, agricultural processing, beverages, tobacco

External
- Exports: $300.52 billion (2024)
- Export goods: machinery (23%), electronics (19%), foods and wood (14%), chemicals and plastics (14%), automobiles and automotive parts (12%), stone and glass (7%), textiles and furniture (4%)
- Main export partners: ASEAN 23.5%; United States 17.2%; China 15.9%; Hong Kong 3.9%; Japan 8.7%; European Union 7.7%; (2023)
- Imports: $306.80 billion (2024)
- Import goods: Capital and intermediate goods, raw materials, consumer goods, fuels
- Main import partners: China 25.3%; ASEAN 16.9%; Japan 10.8%; European Union 6.8%; United States 6.7%; (2023)
- FDI stock: $205.5 billion (2017 est.)
- Gross external debt: $163.40 billion (Q1 2019)

Public finance
- Government debt: 65.71% of GDP (FY2025)
- Foreign reserves: $306.51 billion (December 2025)
- Revenue: ฿2.792 trillion (FY2024)
- Spending: ฿3.273 trillion (FY2024)
- Economic aid: None
- Credit rating: Standard & Poor's: A- (Domestic); BBB+ (Foreign); A (T&C Assessment); Outlook: Stable; Moody's: Baa1; Outlook: Stable; Fitch: A- (Local Currency IDR); BBB+ (Foreign Currency IDR); A- (Country Ceiling); Outlook: Stable; Japan Credit Rating Agency: A (Local Currency IDR); A- (Foreign Currency IDR); A+ (Country Ceiling); Outlook: Stable
- All values, unless otherwise stated, are in US dollars.

Thailand has a developing mixed economy. It is dependent on exports, which accounted for about 58 percent of the country's gross domestic product (GDP) in 2021. Thailand itself is a newly industrialized country, with a GDP of 17.922 trillion baht (US$517.0 billion) in 2023, the 9th largest economy in Asia. In 2025 Thailand recorded average annual deflation of 0.14% and an account surplus of 7.5% of the country's GDP. Its currency, the baht, is ranked as the tenth most frequently used world payment currency in 2017.

As of 2012, the industrial and service sectors were the main sectors in the Thai gross domestic product, with the former accounting for 39.2 percent of GDP. Thailand's agricultural sector produced 8.4 percent of GDP—lower than the trade and logistics and communication sectors, which account for 13.4 percent and 9.8 percent of GDP respectively. The construction and mining sectors add 4.3 percent to the country's gross domestic product. Other service sectors (including the financial, education, and hotel and restaurant sectors) account for 24.9 percent of the country's GDP. Telecommunications and trade in services are emerging as centers of industrial expansion and economic competitiveness.

Thailand is the second-largest economy in Southeast Asia, after Indonesia. Its per capita GDP was 255,362 baht (US$7,210) in 2023 and ranked fourth in Southeast Asian per capita GDP, after Singapore, Brunei, and Malaysia. In December 2025, Thailand held US$306.51 billion in international reserves, the second-largest in Southeast Asia (after Singapore). Its surplus in the current account balance ranks tenth of the world, made US$37.898 billion to the country in 2018. Thailand ranks second in Southeast Asia in external trade volume, after Singapore.

The nation is recognized by the World Bank as "one of the great development success stories" in social and development indicators. Despite a per capita gross national income (GNI) of US$7,090 and ranking 66th in the Human Development Index (HDI), the percentage of people below the national poverty line decreased from 65.26 percent in 1988 to 8.61 percent in 2016, according to the Office of the National Economic and Social Development Council's (NESDC) new poverty baseline.

Thailand is one of the countries with the lowest unemployment rates in the world, reported as one percent for the first quarter of 2014. This is due to a large proportion of the population working in subsistence agriculture or on other vulnerable employment (own-account work and unpaid family work).

== History ==
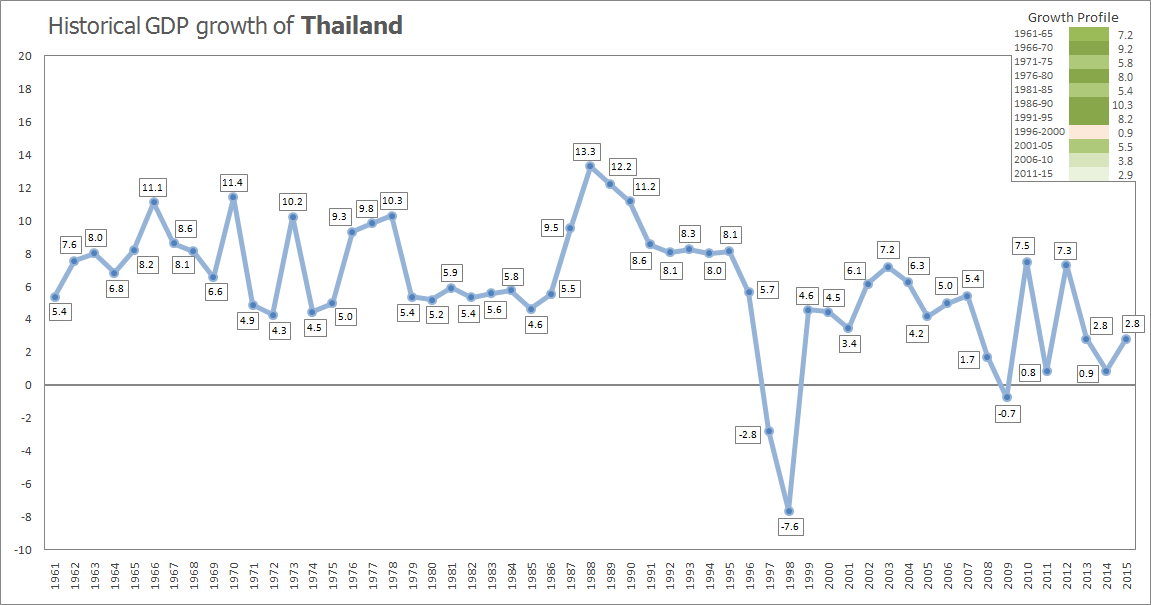
Historical growth of Thailand's economy from 1961 to 2015

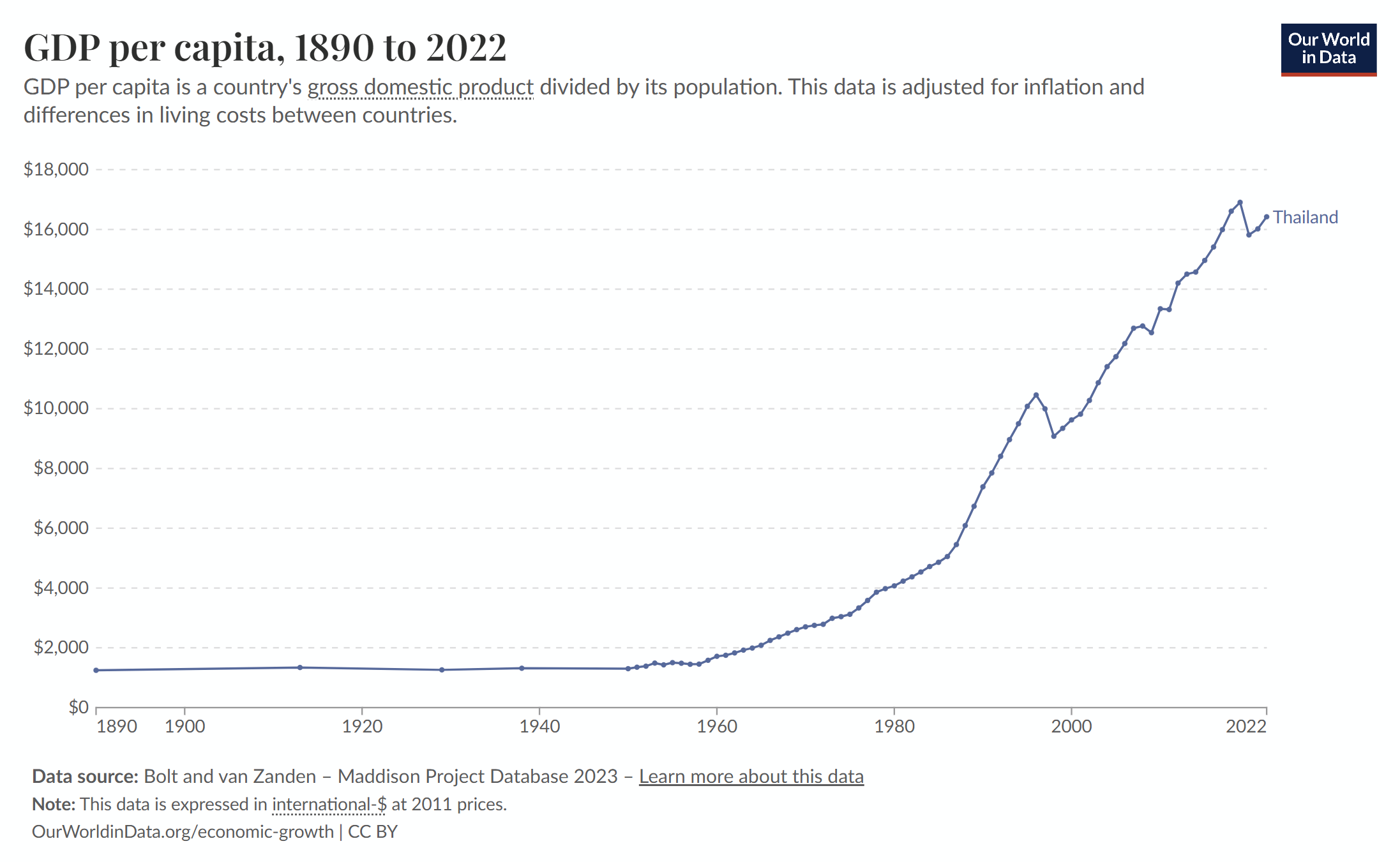
Development of real GDP per capita, 1890 to 2022

=== Ayutthaya era (1351–1767) ===
Thailand, formerly known as Siam, opened to foreign contact in the pre-industrial era. The diverse natural resources of Siam were underutilized. However, coastal ports and cities at the river mouths were early economic centers which welcomed merchants from Persia, Arab countries, Chinese dynasties and various kingdoms in South and Southeast Asia. The rise of Ayutthaya during the 14th century was connected to renewed maritime trade with China, India and Southeast Asia. Ayutthaya became one of the most prosperous trade centers in Asia. However, the Burmese–Siamese War (1765–1767) caused immense economic harm with trade disruption and the eventual destruction of Ayutthaya in 1767.

=== Rattanakosin era (1782–1932) ===
When the capital of the kingdom moved to Bangkok during the 19th century, foreign trade (particularly with China) became the focus of the government. Chinese merchants came to trade; some settled in the country and received official positions. A number of Chinese merchants and migrants became high dignitaries in the court.

From the mid-19th century onward, European merchants were increasingly active. The Bowring Treaty, signed in 1855, guaranteed the privileges of British traders. The Harris Treaty of 1856, which updated the Roberts Treaty of 1833, extended the same guarantees to American traders. There were multiple costly conflicts with French Indochina from the 18th till the mid 20th century. Siam lost major disputed territories such as Laos and Cambodia to the French colonists. The British Empire gained control over Siamese provinces in the Malay peninsula and on the western border with British Burma. Nevertheless, Thailand was the only Southeast Asian country that remained sovereign from European colonial powers.

The domestic market developed slowly, with serfdom, slavery related to the sakdina system as major causes of domestic stagnation. Most of the male population in Siam was in the service of court officials, while their wives and daughters may have traded on a small scale in local markets. Those who were heavily indebted might sell themselves as slaves. King Rama V abolished serfdom and slavery in 1901 and 1905, respectively.

Thailand was a member of the Allies of World War I. From the early 20th century to the end of World War II, Siam's economy gradually became globalized. Major entrepreneurs were ethnic Chinese who became Siamese nationals. Exports of agricultural products (especially rice) were very important and Thailand has been among the top rice exporters in the world. The Siamese economy suffered greatly from the Great Depression, a cause of the Siamese revolution of 1932.

Significant investment in education in the 1930s (and again in the 1950s) laid the basis for economic growth, as did a liberal approach to trade and investment.

=== Bhumibol era (1946–2016) ===
==== Post-war era (1945–1955) ====
Postwar domestic and international politics played significant roles in Thai economic development for most of the Cold War era. From 1945 to 1947 (when the Cold War had not yet begun), the Thai economy suffered because of World War II. During the war, the Thai government (led by Field Marshal Plaek Phibunsongkram) allied with Japan and declared war against the Allies. After the war, Thailand had to supply 1.5 million tons of rice to Western countries without charge, a burden on the country's economic recovery. The government tried to solve the problem by establishing a rice office to oversee the rice trade. During this period, a multiple-exchange-rate system was introduced amid fiscal problems, and the kingdom experienced a shortage of consumer goods.

In November 1947, a brief democratic period was ended by a military coup and the Thai economy regained its momentum. In his dissertation, Somsak Nilnopkoon considers the period from 1947 to 1951 one of prosperity. By April 1948, Phibunsongkram, the wartime prime minister, returned to his previous office. However, he was caught in a power struggle between his subordinates. To preserve his power, Phibunsongkram began an anti-communist campaign to seek support from the United States. As a result, from 1950 onward, Thailand received military and economic aid from the US. The Phibunsongkram government established many state enterprises, which were seen as economic nationalism. The state (and its bureaucrats) dominated capital allocation in the kingdom. Ammar Siamwalla, one of Thailand's most prominent economists, calls it the period of "bureaucratic capitalism".

==== Power struggle and reform (1955–1985) ====
In 1955, Thailand began to see a change in its economy fueled by domestic and international politics. The power struggle between the two main factions of the Phibun regime—led by Police General Phao Sriyanond and General (later, Field Marshal) Sarit Thanarat—increased, causing Sriyanond to unsuccessfully seek support from the US for a coup against Phibunsongkram regime. Plaek Phibunsongkram attempted to democratize his regime, seeking popular support by developing the economy. He again turned to the US, asking for economic rather than military aid. The US responded with unprecedented economic aid to the kingdom from 1955 to 1959. The Phibunsongkram government also made important changes to the country's fiscal policies, including scrapping the multiple-exchange-rate system in favor of a fixed, unified system which was in use until 1984. The government also neutralized trade and conducted secret diplomacy with the People's Republic of China (PRC), displeasing the United States.

Despite his attempts to maintain power, Plaek Phibunsongkram was deposed (with Field Marshal Phin Choonhavan and Police General Phao Siyanon) on 16 September 1957 in a coup led by Field Marshal Sarit Thanarat. The Thanarat regime (in power from 1957 to 1973) maintained the course set by the Phibunsongkram regime with US support after severing all ties with the PRC and supporting US operations in Mainland Southeast Asia and the ongoing Vietnam War (1955-1975). It developed the country's infrastructure and privatized state enterprises unrelated to that infrastructure. During this period, a number of economic institutions were established, including the Bureau of Budget, the NESDC, and the Thailand Board of Investment (BOI). The National Economic and Social Development Plan was implemented in 1961. During this period, the market-oriented Import-Substituting Industrialization (ISI) led to economic expansion in the kingdom during the 1960s. According to former President Richard Nixon's 1967 Foreign Affairs article, Thailand entered a period of rapid growth in 1958 (with an average growth rate of 7 percent per year).

==== Economic problems (1970–1984) ====
From the 1970s to 1984, Thailand suffered from many economic problems: decreasing US investment, budget deficits, oil-price spikes, and inflation. Domestic politics were also unstable. With the Vietnamese occupation of Cambodia on 25 December 1978, Thailand became the front-line state in the struggle against communism, surrounded by two communist countries and a socialist Burma under General Ne Win. Successive governments tried to solve the economic problems by promoting exports and tourism, still important for the Thai economy.

One of the best-known measures to deal with the economic problems of that time was implemented under General Prem Tinsulanonda's government, in power from 1980 to 1988. Between 1981 and 1984, the government devalued the national currency, the Thai baht (THB), three times. On 12 May 1981, it was devalued by 1.07 percent, from THB20.775/US$ to THB21/US$. On 15 July 1981, it was again devalued, this time by 8.7 percent (from THB21/US$ to THB23/US$). The third devaluation, on 5 November 1984, was the most significant: 15 percent, from THB23/US$ to THB27/US$. The government also replaced the country's fixed exchange rate (where it was pegged to the US dollar) with a "multiple currency basket peg system" in which the US dollar bore 80 percent of the weight. Calculated from the IMF's World Economic Outlook Database, in the period 1980–1984, the Thai economy had an average GDP growth rate of 5.4 percent.

==== Economic boom (1985–1997) ====
Concurrent with the third devaluation of the Thai baht, on 22 September 1985, Japan, the US, the United Kingdom, France, and West Germany signed the Plaza Accord to depreciate the US dollar in relation to the yen and the Deutsche Mark. Since the dollar accounted for 80 percent of the Thai currency basket, the baht was depreciated further, making Thailand's exports more competitive and the country more attractive to foreign direct investment (FDI) (especially from Japan, whose currency had appreciated since 1985). In 1988, Prem Tinsulanonda resigned and was succeeded by Chatichai Choonhavan, the first democratically elected prime minister of Thailand since 1976. The Cambodian-Vietnamese War was ending; Vietnam gradually retreated from Cambodia by 1989, enhancing Thai economic development.

After the 1984 baht devaluation and the 1985 Plaza Accord, although the public sector struggled due to fiscal constraints, the private sector grew. The country's improved foreign trade and an influx of foreign direct investment (mainly from Japan) triggered an economic boom from 1987 to 1996. Although Thailand had previously promoted its exports, during this period the country shifted from import-substitution (ISI) to export-oriented industrialization (EOI). During this decade the Thai GDP (calculated from the IMF World Economic Outlook database) had an average growth rate of 9.5 percent per year, with a peak of 13.3 percent in 1988. In the same period, the volume of Thai exports of goods and services had an average growth rate of 14.8 percent, with a peak of 26.1 percent in 1988.

Economic problems persisted. From 1987 to 1996, Thailand experienced a current account deficit averaging −5.4 percent of GDP per year, and the deficit continued to increase. In 1996, the current account deficit accounted for −7.887 percent of GDP (US$14.351 billion). A shortage of capital was another problem. The first Chuan Leekpai government, in office from September 1992 to May 1995, tried to solve this problem by granting Bangkok International Banking Facility (BIBF) licenses to Thai banks in 1993. This allowed BIBF banks to benefit from Thailand's high-interest rate by borrowing from foreign financial institutions at low interest and loaning to Thai businesses. By 1997, foreign debt had risen to US$109,276 billion (65% of which was short-term debt), while Thailand had US$38,700 billion in international reserves. Many loans were backed by real estate, creating an economic bubble. By late 1996, there was a loss of confidence in the country's financial institutions; the government closed 18 trust companies and three commercial banks. The following year, 56 financial institutions were closed by the government.

Another problem was foreign speculation. Aware of Thailand's economic problems and its currency basket exchange rate, foreign speculators (including hedge funds) were certain that the government would again devalue the baht, under pressure on both the spot and forward markets. In the spot market, to force devaluation, speculators took out loans in baht and made loans in dollars. In the forward market, speculators (believing that the baht would soon be devalued) bet against the currency by contracting with dealers who would give dollars in return for an agreement to repay a specific amount of baht several months in the future.

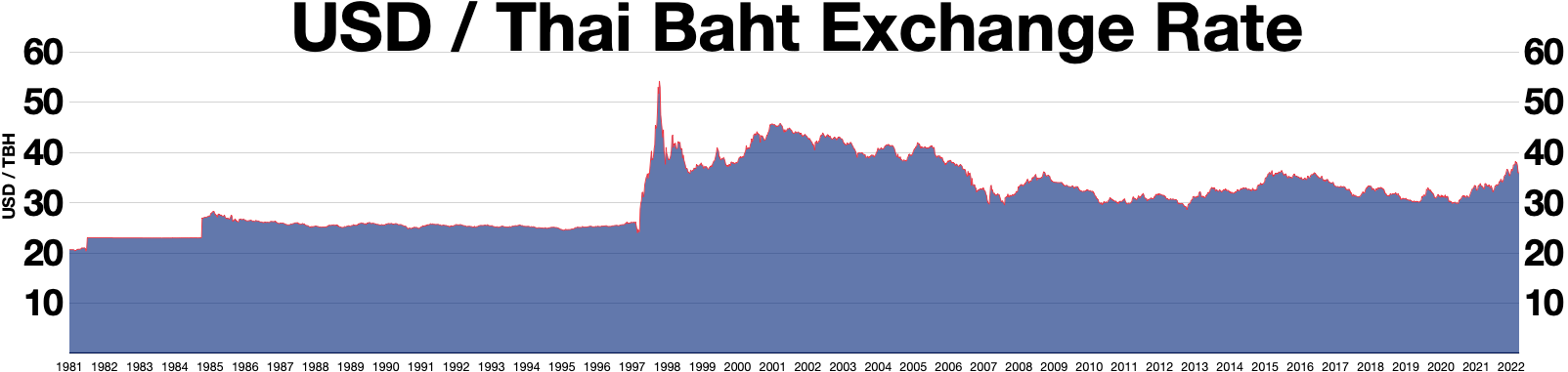
USD / Thai Baht exchange rate

In the government, there was a call from Virapong Ramangkul (an economic advisor of Prime Minister Chavalit Yongchaiyudh) to devalue the baht, which was supported by former Prime Minister Prem Tinsulanonda. Yongchaiyudh ignored them, relying on the Bank of Thailand (led by Governor Rerngchai Marakanond, who spent as much as US$24 billion – about two-thirds of Thailand's international reserves) to protect the baht. On 2 July 1997, Thailand had US$2,850 billion remaining in international reserves, and could no longer protect the baht. That day Marakanond decided to float the baht, triggering the 1997 Asian financial crisis.

==== Financial crisis (1997–2000) ====
Countries affected by the 1997 Asian financial crisis

The Thai economy collapsed as a result of the 1997 Asian financial crisis. Within a few months, the value of the baht floated from THB25/US$ (its lowest point) to THB56/US$. The Stock Exchange of Thailand (SET) dropped from a peak of 1,753.73 in 1994 to a low of 207.31 in 1998. The country's GDP dropped from THB3.115 trillion at the end of 1996 to THB2.749 trillion at the end of 1998. In dollar terms, it took Thailand as long as 10 years to regain its 1996 GDP. The unemployment rate went up nearly threefold: from 1.5 percent of the labor force in 1996 to 4.4 percent in 1998.

A sharp decrease in the value of the baht abruptly increased foreign debt, undermining financial institutions. Many were sold, in part, to foreign investors while others went bankrupt. Due to low international reserves from the Bank of Thailand's currency-protection measures, the government had to accept a loan from the International Monetary Fund (IMF). Overall, Thailand received US$17.2 billion in aid.

The crisis impacted Thai politics. One direct effect was that Prime Minister Chavalit Yongchaiyudh resigned under pressure on 6 November 1997, succeeded by opposition leader Chuan Leekpai. The second Leekpai government, in office from November 1997 to February 2001, tried to implement economic reforms based on IMF-guided neo-liberal capitalism. It pursued strict fiscal policies (keeping interest rates high and cutting government spending), enacting 11 laws it called "bitter medicine" and critics called "the 11 nation-selling laws". The Thai government and its supporters maintained that with these measures, the Thai economy improved.

In 1999, Thailand had a positive GDP growth rate for the first time since the crisis. Many critics, however, mistrusted the IMF and maintained that government-spending cuts harmed the recovery. Unlike economic problems in Latin America and Africa, they asserted, the Asian financial crisis was born in the private sector and the IMF measures were inappropriate. The positive growth rate in 1999 was because the country's GDP had gone down for two consecutive years, as much as −10.5 percent in 1998 alone. In terms of the baht, it was not until 2002 (in dollar terms, not until 2006) that Thailand would regain its 1996 GDP. An additional 1999 loan from the Miyazawa Plan made the question of whether (or to what extent) the Leekpai government helped the Thai economy controversial.

==== Early 21st century ====
An indirect effect of the financial crisis on Thai politics was the rise of Thaksin Shinawatra. In reaction to the government's economic policies, Thaksin Shinawatra's Thai Rak Thai Party won a landslide victory over Chuan Leekpai's Democrat Party in the 2001 general election and took office in February 2001. Although weak export demand held the GDP growth rate to 2.2 percent in the first year of his administration, the first Thaksin Shinawatra government performed well from 2002 to 2004 with growth rates of 5.3, 7.1 and 6.3 percent respectively. His policy was later called Thaksinomics. During Thaksin's first term, Thailand's economy regained momentum and the country paid off its IMF debt by July 2003 (two years ahead of schedule). Despite criticism of Thaksinomics, Thaksin's party won another landslide victory over the Democrat Party in the 2005 general election. The official economic data related to Thaksinomics reveals that between 2001 and 2011, the GDP per capita of Isan, the country's large north-eastern region, more than doubled to US$1,475, while, over the same period, GDP in the Bangkok area rose from US$7,900 to nearly US$13,000. The cost of air and water pollution in Thailand is around 1.6–2.6% of GDP per year based on a 2004 indicator.

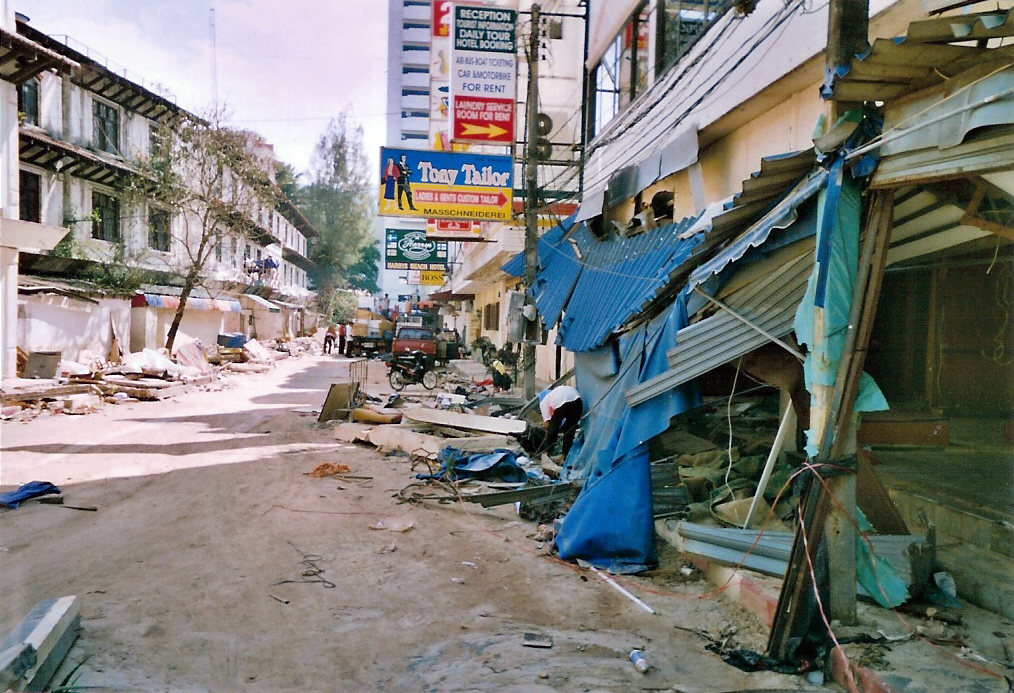
Phuket in 2004. The Indian Ocean tsunami affected the economy

Thaksin's second term was less successful. The 2004 Indian Ocean earthquake and tsunami caused a big human toll, damage and negatively impacted the first-quarter Thai GDP in 2005. The Yellow Shirts, a coalition of protesters against Thaksin, also emerged in 2005. In 2006, Thaksin dissolved the parliament and called for a general election. The April 2006 general election was boycotted by the main opposition parties. Thaksin's party won again, but the election was declared invalid by the Constitutional Court. Another general election, scheduled for October 2006, was cancelled. On 19 September a group of soldiers calling themselves the Council for Democratic Reform under the Constitutional Monarchy led by Sonthi Boonyaratglin organized a coup, ousting Thaksin while he was in New York City preparing for a speech at the United Nations General Assembly. During the last year of the second Thaksin government, the Thai GDP grew by 5.1 percent. Under his government, Thailand's overall ranking in the IMD Global Competitiveness Scoreboard rose from 31st in 2002 to 25th in 2005 before falling to 29th in 2006.

After the coup, Thailand's economy again suffered. From the last quarter of 2006 through 2007, the country was ruled by a military junta led by General Surayud Chulanont, who was appointed prime minister in October 2006. The 2006 GDP growth rate slowed from 6.1, 5.1 and 4.8 percent year-over-year in the first three-quarters to 4.4 percent (YoY) in Q4. Thailand's ranking on the IMD Global Competitiveness Scoreboard fell from 26th in 2005 to 29th in 2006 and 33rd in 2007. Thaksin's plan for massive infrastructure investments was unmentioned until 2011, when his younger sister Yingluck Shinawatra entered office. In 2007, the Thai economy grew by 5 percent. On 23 December 2007, the military government held a general election. The pro-Thaksin People's Power Party, led by Samak Sundaravej, won a landslide victory over Abhisit Vejjajiva's Democrat Party.

Under the People's Power Party-led government the country fell into political turmoil. This, combined with the 2008 financial crisis cut the 2008 Thai GDP growth rate to 2.5%. Before the People's Alliance for Democracy (PAD) and the Yellow Shirts reconvened in March 2008, the GDP grew by 6.5 percent (YoY) in the first quarter of the year. Thailand's ranking on the IMD World Competitiveness Scoreboard rose from 33rd in 2007 to 27th in 2008. The Yellow Shirts occupied the Government House of Thailand in August 2008, and on 9 September the Constitutional Court delivered a decision removing Samak Sundaravej from the prime ministership.

Somchai Wongsawat, Thaksin's brother-in-law, succeeded Samak Sundaravej as prime minister on 18 September. In the US, the 2008 financial crisis reached its peak while the Yellow Shirts were still in Government House, impeding government operations. GDP growth dropped from 5.2 percent (YoY) in Q2 2008 to 3.1 percent (YoY) and −4.1 percent (YoY) in Q3 and Q4. From 25 November to 3 December 2008 the Yellow Shirts, protesting Somchai Wongsawat's prime ministership, seized the two Bangkok airports, (Suvarnabhumi and Don Mueang), and damaged Thailand's image and economy. On 2 December the Thai Constitutional Court issued a decision dissolving the People's Power Party, ousting Somchai Wongsawat as prime minister.

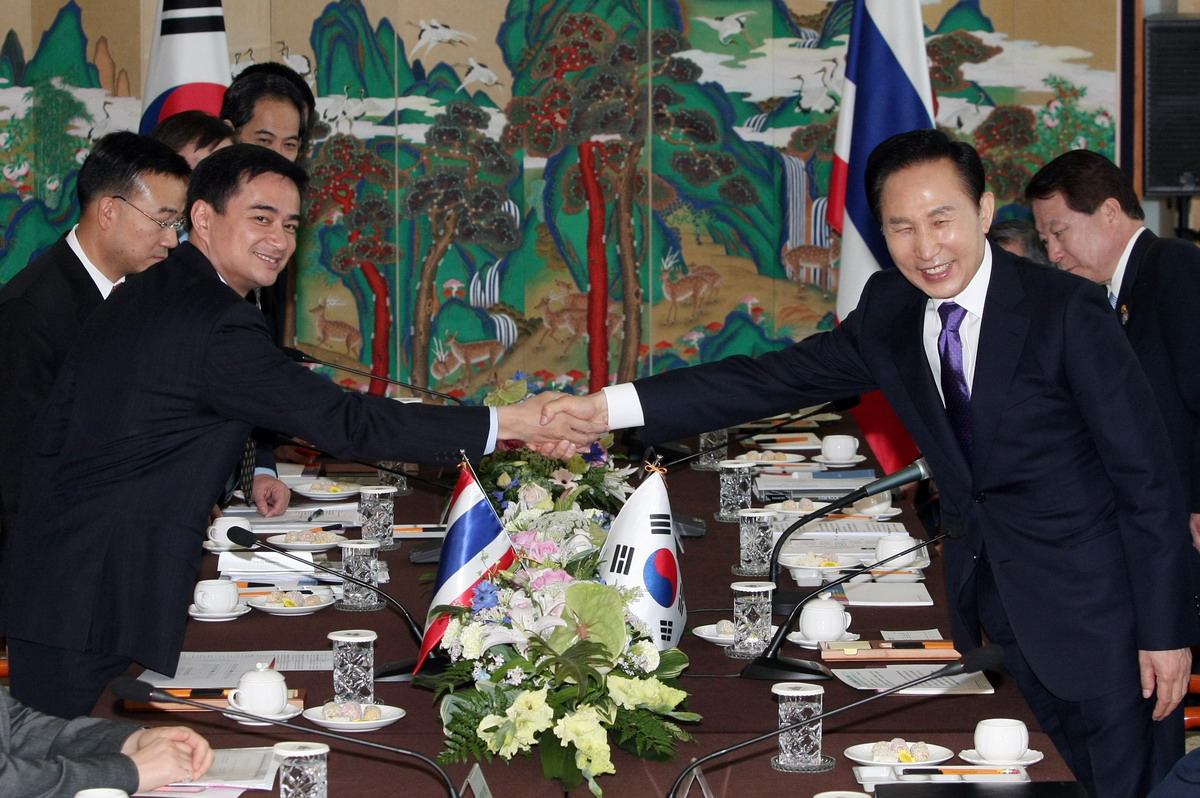
A coalition government under Abhisit Vejjajiva was formed in 2008

By the end of 2008, a coalition government led by Abhisit Vejjajiva's Democrat Party was formed: "[The] legitimacy of the Abhisit government has been questioned since the first day that the Democrat party took the office in 2008 as it was allegedly formed by the military in a military camp". The government was under pressure from the 2008 financial crisis and the Red Shirts, who refused to acknowledge Abhisit Vejjajiva's prime ministry and called for new elections as soon as possible. However, Abhisit rejected the call until he dissolved the parliament for a new election in May 2011. In 2009, his first year in office, Thailand experienced a negative growth rate for the first time since the 1997 Asian financial crisis: a GDP of −2.3 percent.

In 2010, the country's growth rate increased to 7.8 percent. However, with the instability surrounding the major 2010 protests, the GDP growth of Thailand settled at around 4–5 percent from highs of 5–7 percent under the previous civilian administration—political uncertainty was identified as the primary cause of a decline in investor and consumer confidence. The IMF predicted that the Thai economy would rebound strongly from the low 0.1 percent GDP growth in 2011, to 5.5 percent in 2012 and then 7.5 percent in 2013, due to the accommodating monetary policy of the Bank of Thailand, as well as a package of fiscal stimulus measures introduced by the incumbent Yingluck Shinawatra government.

In the first two-quarters of 2011, when the political situation was relatively calm, the Thai GDP grew by 3.2 and 2.7 percent (YoY). Under Abhisit's administration, Thailand's ranking fell from 26 in 2009, to 27 in 2010 and 2011, and the country's infrastructure declined since 2009.

In the 2011 general election, the pro-Thaksin Pheu Thai Party again won a decisive victory over the Democrat Party, and Thaksin's youngest sister, Yingluck Shinawatra, succeeded Abhisit as prime minister. Elected in July, the Pheu Thai Party-led government began its administration in late-August, and when Yingluck Shinawatra entered office, the 2011 Thailand floods threatened the country—from 25 July 2011 to 16 January 2012, flood waters covered 65 of the country's 76 provinces. The World Bank assessed the total damage in December 2011 and reported a cost of THB1.425 trillion (about US$45.7 billion).

The 2011 GDP growth rate fell to 0.1 percent, with a contraction of 8.9 percent (YoY) in Q4 alone. The country's overall competitiveness ranking, according to the IMD World Competitiveness Scoreboard, fell from 27 in 2011 to 30 in 2012.

In 2012, Thailand was recovering from the previous year's severe flood. The Yingluck government planned to develop the country's infrastructure, ranging from a long-term water-management system to logistics. The Euro area crisis reportedly harmed Thailand's economic growth in 2012, directly and indirectly affecting the country's exports. Thailand's GDP grew by 6.5 percent, with a headline inflation rate of 3.02 percent, and a current account surplus of 0.7 percent of the country's GDP.

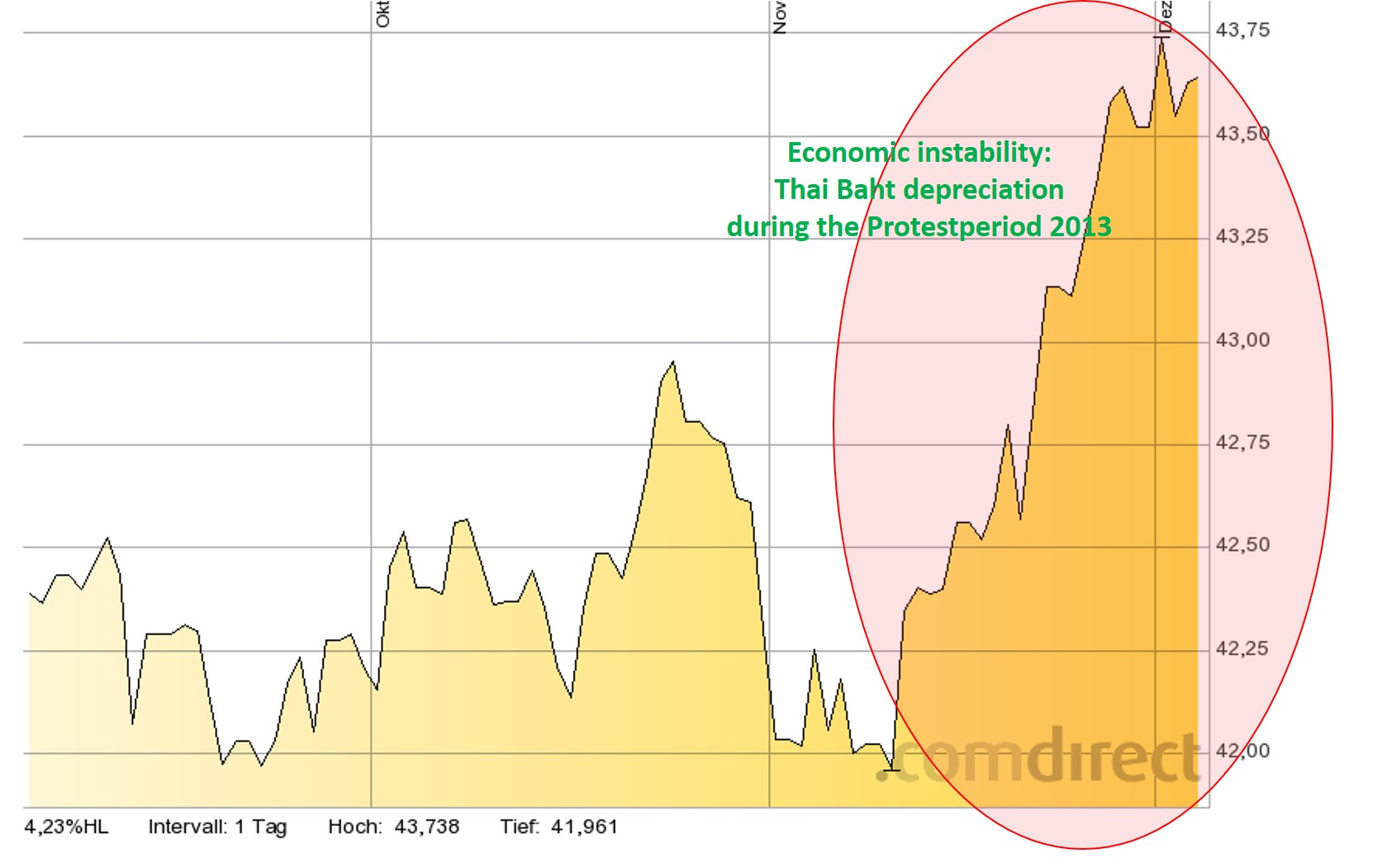
The Thai baht depreciated during the 2013 Thai protests

On 23 December 2013, the Thai baht dropped to a three-year low due to the political unrest during the preceding months. According to Bloomberg, the Thai currency lost 4.6 percent over November and December, while the main stock index also dropped (9.1 percent).

Following the Thai military coup in May 2014, Agence France Presse (AFP) published an article claiming that the nation was on the "verge of recession". Published on 17 June 2014, the article's main subject is the departure of nearly 180,000 Cambodians from Thailand due to fears of an immigration "clampdown", but concluded with information on the Thai economy's contraction of 2.1 percent quarter-on-quarter, from January to the end of March 2014.

Since the cessation of the curfew that was enacted by the military in May 2014, the Federation of Thai Industries (FTI)'s chairman, Supant Mongkolsuthree, said that he projects growth of 2.5–3 percent for the Thai economy in 2014, as well as a revitalisation of the Thai tourism industry in the second half of 2014. Furthermore, Supant also cited the Board of Investment's future consideration of a backlog of investment projects, estimated at 700 billion baht, as an economically beneficial process that would occur around October 2014. Thailand's flagging economic performance led, at the end of 2015, to increased criticism of the National Council for Peace and Order's (NCPO) handling of the economy, both at home and in influential Western media. The country's economic growth of 2.8% in the first quarter of 2019 was recorded to be the slowest since 2014.

=== Vajiralongkorn era (2016–present) ===
The military government unveiled its newest economic initiative, "Thailand 4.0", in 2016. Thailand 4.0 is the "...master plan to free Thailand from the middle-income trap, making it a high-income nation in five years."

The government narrative describes Thailand 1.0 as the agrarian economy of Thailand decades ago. Thailand 1.0 gave way to Thailand 2.0, when the nation's economy moved on to light industry, textiles, and food processing. Thailand 3.0 describes the present day, with heavy industry and energy accounting for up to 70 percent of the Thai GDP. Thailand 4.0 is described as an economy driven by high tech industries and innovation that will lead to the production of value-added products and services. According to General Prayut Chan-o-cha, the prime minister, Thailand 4.0 is composed of three elements: 1. Make Thailand a high-income nation, 2. Make Thailand a more inclusive society, and 3. Focus on sustainable growth and development.

Critics of Thailand 4.0 point out that Thailand lacks the specialists and experts, especially in high-technology, needed to modernise the Thai industry. "...the government will have to allow the import of foreign specialists to help bring forward Thailand 4.0," said Dr. Somchai Jitsuchon, research director for inclusive development at the Thailand Development Research Institute (TDRI). "...that won't be easy as local professional associations will oppose the idea as they want to reserve those professional careers for Thais only". He went on to point out that only 56 percent of Thailand's population has access to the Internet, an obstacle to the creation of a high-tech workforce. A major thrust of Thailand 4.0 is encouraging a move to industrial robot manufacturing. However, Thailand's membership in the ASEAN Economic Community (AEC), makes cheap workers from neighbouring countries even more readily available, which will make it harder to make the economic case to switch to robots. Somchai also pointed out that the bureaucratic nature of the Thai government will make realisation of Thailand 4.0 difficult. Every action plan calls for results from several ministries, "all of which are big, clumsily-run organisations" slow to perform.

In September 2020, the World Bank Group forecasted that the Thai economy would contract 8.9% by the end of the year due to the COVID-19 pandemic. The Thai government reduced the jet fuel tax between April 2020 and June 2023.

In August 2024, the dismissal of Thai Prime Minister Srettha Thavisin exacerbated Thailand's economic difficulties, impeding the implementation of significant financial measures. This political upheaval intensified existing issues such as high household debt and economic stagnation, further undermining investor confidence and economic stability.

== Macroeconomic trends ==
The following table shows the main economic indicators in 1980–2025 (with IMF staff estimates in 2026–2031).

Year	GDP (in Bil. US$PPP)	GDP per capita (in US$ PPP)	GDP (in bn. US$nominal)	GDP per capita (in US$ nominal)	GDP growth (real)	Inflation rate (in Percent)	Unemployment (in Percent)	Government debt (in % of GDP)
1980	75.7	1,598.4	33.4	705.5	▲4.6%	19.7%	n/a	n/a
1981	▲87.8	▲1,816.5	▲36.0	▲744.9	▲5.9%	▼12.7%	n/a	n/a
1982	▲98.2	▲1,993.6	▲37.8	▲767.4	▲5.4%	▼5.3%	n/a	n/a
1983	▲107.7	▲2,147.3	▲41.4	▲824.4	▲5.6%	▼3.9%	n/a	n/a
1984	▲118.1	▲2,310.5	▲43.2	▲845.1	▲5.8%	▼0.9%	n/a	n/a
1985	▲127.4	▲2,449.6	▼40.2	▼772.4	▲4.6%	▲2.3%	n/a	n/a
1986	▲137.2	▲2,589.8	▲44.5	▲840.3	▲5.5%	▼1.8%	n/a	n/a
1987	▲154.0	▲2,854.5	▲52.2	▲967.7	▲9.5%	▲2.6%	n/a	n/a
1988	▲180.6	▲3,290.2	▲63.7	▲1,160.5	▲13.3%	▲3.8%	n/a	n/a
1989	▲210.6	▲3,775.6	▲74.6	▲1,338.3	▲12.2%	▲5.5%	n/a	n/a
1990	▲243.8	▲4,311.4	▲88.5	▲1,564.2	▲11.6%	▲5.8%	2.2%	n/a
1991	▲273.3	▲4,774.8	▲101.2	▲1,769.0	▲8.4%	▼5.8%	▲3.1%	n/a
1992	▲305.3	▲5,281.0	▲115.6	▲1,999.2	▲9.2%	▼4.0%	▼2.8%	n/a
1993	▲339.6	▲5,822.1	▲128.9	▲2,209.4	▲8.7%	▼3.4%	▼2.6%	n/a
1994	▲374.6	▲6,363.3	▲146.7	▲2,491.4	▲8.0%	▲5.1%	2.6%	n/a
1995	▲413.6	▲6,954.4	▲169.3	▲2,846.6	▲8.1%	▲5.8%	▼1.7%	n/a
1996	▲444.9	▲7,399.5	▲183.0	▲3,044.0	▲5.7%	▲5.8%	▼1.5%	15.2%
1997	▼440.1	▼7,233.6	▼150.2	▼2,468.2	▼-2.8%	▼5.6%	1.5%	▲40.5%
1998	▼411.1	▼6,675.5	▼113.7	▼1,845.8	▼-7.6%	▲8.0%	▲4.4%	▲49.9%
1999	▲436.0	▲6,998.4	▲126.7	▲2,033.3	▲4.6%	▼0.2%	▼4.2%	▲56.6%
2000	▲465.7	▲7,391.6	▼126.4	▼2,006.0	▲4.5%	▲1.7%	▼3.6%	▲57.8%
2001	▲492.6	▲7,739.4	▼120.3	▼1,889.9	▲3.4%	▼1.6%	▼3.3%	▼57.5%
2002	▲531.0	▲8,263.1	▲134.3	▲2,089.8	▲6.1%	▼0.7%	▼2.4%	▼54.9%
2003	▲580.5	▲8,948.2	▲152.3	▲2,347.5	▲7.2%	▲1.8%	▼2.2%	▼47.5%
2004	▲633.5	▲9,679.6	▲172.9	▲2,641.6	▲6.3%	▲2.8%	▼2.1%	▼46.3%
2005	▲680.8	▲10,312.1	▲189.3	▲2,867.7	▲4.2%	▲4.5%	▼1.9%	▼45.5%
2006	▲736.6	▲11,066.0	▲221.8	▲3,331.3	▲5.0%	▲4.7%	▼1.5%	▼39.2%
2007	▲797.7	▲11,888.0	▲262.9	▲3,918.5	▲5.4%	▼2.2%	▼1.4%	▼36.0%
2008	▲827.1	▲12,231.8	▲291.4	▲4,309.1	▲1.7%	▲5.5%	1.4%	▼34.9%
2009	▼826.5	▼12,132.3	▼281.7	▼4,135.4	▼-0.7%	▼-0.9%	▲1.5%	▲42.4%
2010	▲899.4	▲13,114.2	▲341.1	▲4,973.9	▲7.5%	▲3.3%	▼1.0%	▼39.8%
2011	▲925.6	▲13,413.5	▲370.8	▲5,373.6	▲0.8%	▲3.8%	▼0.7%	▼39.1%
2012	▲1,011.2	▲14,562.4	▲397.6	▲5,725.5	▲7.2%	▼3.0%	0.7%	▲41.9%
2013	▲1,056.0	▲15,119.2	▲420.3	▲6,018.1	▲2.7%	▼2.2%	0.7%	▲42.2%
2014	▲1,085.0	▲15,451.8	▼407.3	▼5,801.2	▲1.0%	▼1.9%	▲0.8%	▲43.3%
2015	▲1,129.4	▲16,010.0	▼401.3	▼5,688.9	▲3.1%	▼-0.9%	▲0.9%	▼42.6%
2016	▲1,179.3	▲16,642.1	▲413.4	▲5,833.6	▲3.4%	▲0.2%	▲1.0%	▼41.7%
2017	▲1,250.5	▲17,573.3	▲456.4	▲6,413.1	▲4.2%	▲0.7%	▲1.2%	▲41.8%
2018	▲1,347.3	▲18,876.2	▲506.8	▲7,099.8	▲4.2%	▲1.1%	▼1.1%	▲41.9%
2019	▲1,427.8	▲19,963.4	▲544.0	▲7,605.7	▲2.1%	▼0.7%	▼1.0%	▼41.1%
2020	▼1,372.4	▼19,156.6	▼500.3	▼6,983.0	▼-6.1%	▼-0.8%	▲1.7%	▲49.4%
2021	▲1,451.5	▲20,237.0	▲506.1	▲7,055.2	▲1.6%	▲1.2%	▲1.9%	▲58.4%
2022	▲1,597.0	▲22,262.5	▼495.7	▼6,910.0	▲2.7%	▲6.1%	▼1.3%	▲60.5%
2023	▲1,694.0	▲23,625.9	▲517.0	▲7,210.5	▲2.2%	▼1.2%	▼1.0%	▲62.2%
2024	▲1,788.6	▲24,956.7	▲529.4	▲7,386.6	▲2.9%	▼0.4%	1.0%	▲62.9%
2025	▲1,879.9	▲26,247.9	▲577.0	▲8,056.6	▲2.4%	▼-0.1%	1.0%	▲64.7%
2026	▲1,983.9	▲27,724.3	▲599.1	▲8,372.3	▲2.1%	▲2.1%	1.0%	▲67.2%
2027	▲2,089.3	▲29,226.5	▼598.1	▼8,367.0	▲2.1%	▼1.7%	1.0%	▲68.5%
2028	▲2,181.5	▲30,550.7	▲615.7	▲8,621.8	▲2.3%	▼1.5%	1.0%	▲69.1%
2029	▲2,277.8	▲31,939.3	▲641.6	▲8,996.2	▲2.5%	▲1.7%	1.0%	▲69.4%
2030	▲2,378.3	▲33,395.6	▲669.3	▲9,398.7	▲2.5%	▲1.8%	1.0%	▲69.6%
2031	▲2,479.9	▲34,877.2	▲699.5	▲9,837.3	▲2.5%	▲2.0%	1.0%	▲69.7%

The GDP at current prices shows that from 1980 to 2012 the Thai economy expanded nearly sixteen-fold when measured in baht, or nearly eleven-fold when measured in dollars, which made Thailand the 32nd-biggest economy in the world at that time, according to the IMF. With regard to GDP, Thailand has undergone five periods of economic growth. From 1980 to 1984, the economy has grown by an average of 5.4 percent per year. Regional businesses account for 70 percent of GDP, with Bangkok contributing 30 percent.

After the 1984 baht devaluation and the 1985 Plaza Accord, a significant amount of foreign direct investment (mainly from Japan) raised the average growth rate per year to 8.8 percent from 1985 to 1996 before slumping to −5.9 percent per year from 1997 to 1998. From 1999 to 2006, Thailand averaged a growth rate of 5.0% per year. Since 2007, the country has faced a number of challenges: a military coup in late 2006, political turmoil from 2008 to 2011, the 2008 financial crisis, floods in 2010 and 2011, and the Euro area crisis. As a result, from 2007 to 2012 the average GDP growth rate was 3.25% per year.

According to the IMF, in 2012 Thailand ranked 92nd in the world in its nominal GDP per capita.

== Industries ==
=== SMEs ===
Virtually all of Thailand's firms, 99.7 percent, or 2.7 million enterprises, are classified as small or medium-sized enterprises (SMEs). As of 2017, SMEs account for 80.3 percent (13 million) of Thailand's total employment. Despite the large number of SMEs, their contribution to the nation's GDP decreased from 41.3 percent of GDP in 2002 to 37.4 percent in 2013. Their declining contribution is reflected in their turnover rate: seventy percent fail within "...a few years".

=== Agriculture, forestry and fishing ===
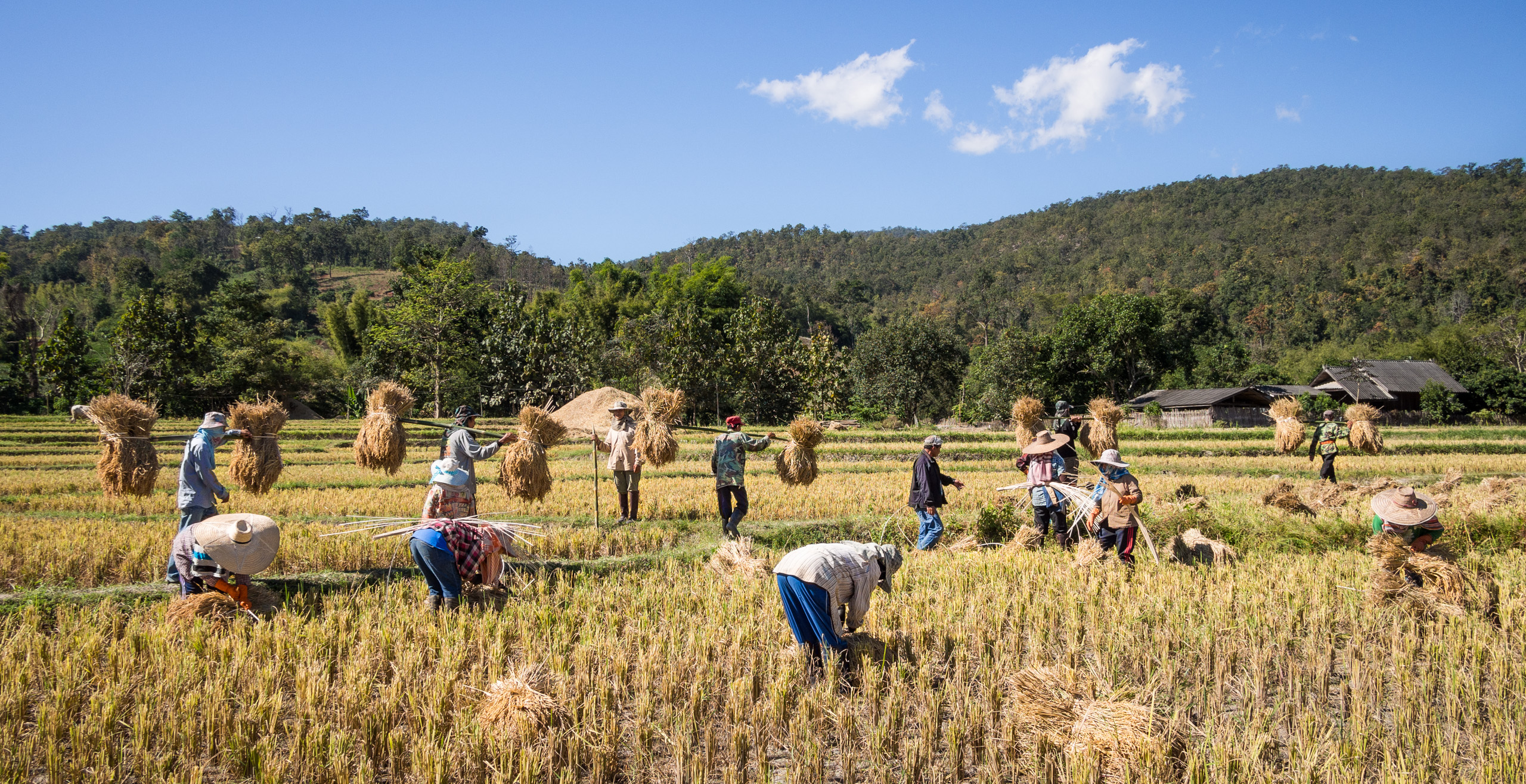
Thailand has been the largest rice exporter in the world. Forty-nine percent of Thailand's labor force is employed in agriculture.

Developments in agriculture since the 1960s have supported Thailand's transition to an industrialised economy. As recently as 1980, agriculture supplied 70 percent of employment. In 2008, agriculture, forestry and fishing contributed 8.4 percent to GDP; in rural areas, farm jobs supply half of employment. Rice is the most important crop in the country and Thailand had long been the world's number one exporter of rice, until recently falling behind both India and Vietnam. It is a major exporter of shrimp. Other crops include coconuts, corn, rubber, soybeans, sugarcane and tapioca.

Thailand is the world's third-largest seafood exporter. Overall fish exports were worth around US$3 billion in 2014, according to the Thai Frozen Foods Association. Thailand's fishing industry employs more than 300,000 persons.

In 1985, Thailand designated 25 percent of its land area for forest protection and 15 percent for timber production. Forests have been set aside for conservation and recreation, and timber forests are available for the forestry industry. Between 1992 and 2001, exports of logs and sawn timber increased from 50,000 to 2,000,000 cubic meters per year.

The regional avian-flu outbreak contracted Thailand's agricultural sector in 2004, and the tsunami of 26 December devastated the Andaman Sea fishing industry. In 2005 and 2006, agricultural GDP was reported to have contracted by 10 percent.

=== Industry and manufacturing ===
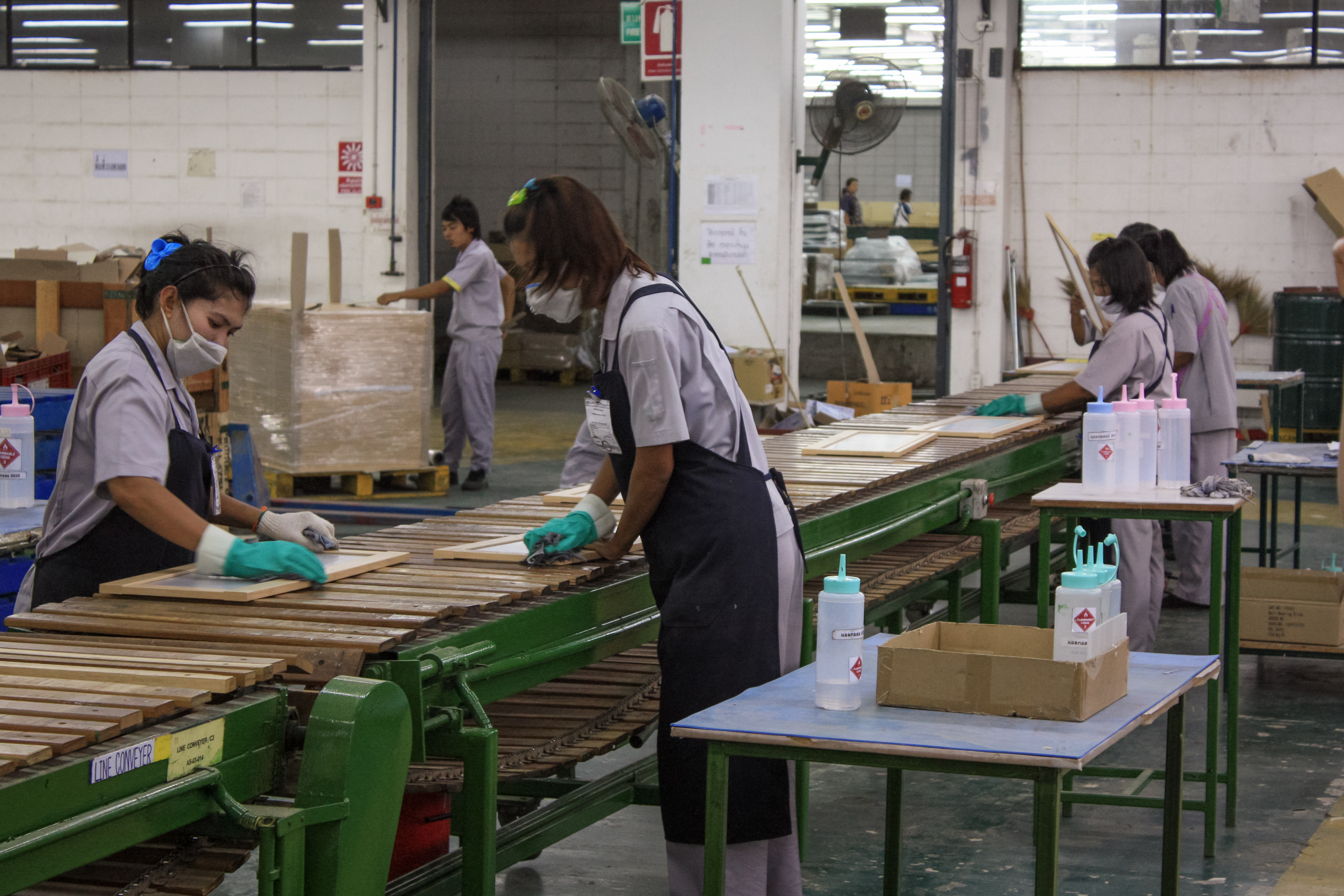
Production-line workers at a factory in Chachoengsao.

In 2007 industry contributed 43.9 percent of GDP, employing 14 percent of the workforce. Industry expanded at an average annual rate of 3.4 percent from 1995 to 2005. The most important sub-sector of industry is manufacturing, which accounted for 34.5 percent of GDP in 2004.

==== Electrical and electronics ====
Electrical and electronics (E&E) equipment is Thailand's largest export sector, amounting to about 15 percent of total exports. In 2014 Thailand's E&E exports totaled US$55 billion. The E&E sector employed approximately 780,000 workers in 2015, representing 12.2 per cent of the total employment in manufacturing.

As of 2020, Thailand is the largest exporter of computers and computer components in ASEAN. Thailand is the world's second-biggest maker of hard disk drives (HDDs) after China, with Western Digital and Seagate Technology among the biggest producers. But problems may loom for Thailand's high-tech sector. In January 2015, the country's manufacturing index fell for the 22nd consecutive month, with production of goods like televisions and radios down 38 percent year-on-year. Manufacturers are relocating to nations where labour is cheaper than in Thailand. In April 2015, production will cease at an LG Electronics factory in Rayong Province. Production is being moved to Vietnam, where labour costs per day are US$6.35 versus US$9.14 in Thailand. Samsung Electronics will site two large smartphone factories in Vietnam. It made around US$11 billion worth of investment pledges to the Vietnamese economy in 2014. As technologies evolve, e.g., as HDDs are replaced by solid-state drives (SSDs), manufacturers are reexamining where best to produce these latest technologies. In addition, 74 percent of salaried workers in the sector face a high risk of being replaced by robots, as these positions consist of "repetitive, non-cognitive tasks".

==== Automotive ====
Thailand is the ASEAN leader in automotive production and sales. The sector employed approximately 417,000 workers in 2015, representing 6.5 per cent of total employment across all manufacturing industries and accounting for roughly 10 percent of the country's GDP. In 2014, Thailand exported US$25.8 billion in automotive goods. As many as 73 percent of automotive sector workers in Thailand face a high risk of job loss due to automation.

Cars, motorbikes, parts and components export of Thailand
Year	Value (THB billion)	as % of GDP
2011	566.355	5.37%
2012	751.132	6.08%
2013	812.085	6.29%
2014	832.750	6.31%
2015	892.623	6.53%
2016	944.434	6.58%
2017	881.380	5.90%
2018	882.083	n/a

Car production in Thailand
Year	Units	Production for		Export value (THB billion)	Export value as % of GDP
Year	Units	Domestic	Export	Export value (THB billion)	Export value as % of GDP
2005	▲1,125,316	690,409	434,907	203.025	2.86%
2006	▲1,188,044	646,838	541,206	240.764	3.07%
2007	▲1,287,379	598,287	689,092	306.595	3.60%
2008	▲1,394,029	610,317	783,712	351.326	3.78%
2009	▼999,378	447,318	552,060	251.342	2.78%
2010	▲1,645,304	750,614	894,690	404.659	4.00%
2011	▼1,457,795	723,845	733,950	343.383	3.26%
2012	▲2,453,717	1,432,052	1,021,665	490.134	3.97%
2013	▲2,457,086	1,335,783	1,121,303	512.186	3.97%
2014	▼1,880,007	757,853	1,122,154	527.423	3.99%
2015	▲1,913,002	712,028	1,200,974	592.550	4.33%
2016	▲1,944,417	776,843	1,167,574	631.845	4.40%
2017	▲1,988,823	862,391	1,126,432	603.037	4.04%
2018	▲2,167,694	1,024,961	1,142,733	594.809	n/a
2019	▼2,013,710	976,546	1,037,164	785.945	n/a
2020	▼1,426,970	722,344	704,626	591.906	n/a
2021	▲1,685,705	759,119	959,194	561.147	n/a
2022	▲1,883,515	849,388	1,000,256	619.348	10.37%
2023	▼1,841,663	685,628	1,156,035	619.348	10.37%

Source: Federation of Thai Industries

==== Chemical ====
Thailand's chemical industry is a cornerstone of its economy, particularly the petrochemical sector, which accounts for approximately 5% of the national GDP. The country serves as a regional hub in Southeast Asia, leveraging its strategic location and well-developed infrastructure such as the Map Ta Phut Industrial Estate, which is one of the world's top 20 largest petrochemical clusters.

==== Construction ====
Thailand's construction industry is projected to grow to THB 489.6 billion in 2026, driven by public infrastructure projects such as the Eastern Economic Corridor.

==== Gems and jewelry ====
Gem and jewelry exports are Thailand's third-largest export category by value, trailing automotive and parts and computer components. In 2019, gem and jewelry exports, including gold, exceeded US$15.7 billion, up 30.3% from 2018 (486 billion baht, up 26.6%). Key export markets included ASEAN, India, the Middle East, and Hong Kong. The industry employs more than 700,000 workers according to the Gem and Jewelry Institute of Thailand (GIT).

==== Mining ====
Thailand is the world's second-largest exporter of gypsum (after Canada), although government policy limits gypsum exports to support prices. In 2003 Thailand produced more than 40 different minerals, with an annual value of about US$740 million. In September 2003, to encourage foreign investment in mining the government relaxed its restrictions on mining by foreign companies and reduced mineral royalties owed to the state.

==== Textile ====
Thailand's textile industry is a cornerstone of its economy. Valued at approximately USD22 billion, it is one of the few global markets that maintains a complete "vertically integrated" value chain, from raw fiber production to finished fashion garments.

=== Energy ===
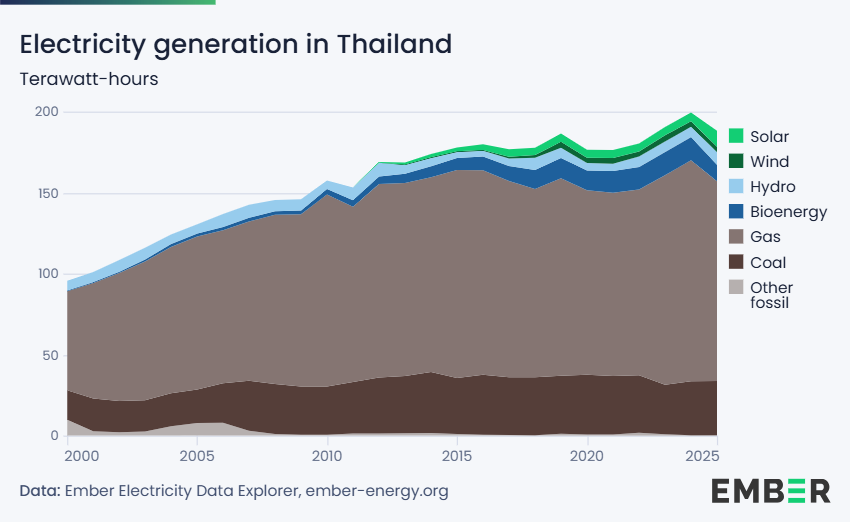
Electricity generation in Thailand in terawatt-hours

Thailand's 2004 energy consumption was estimated at 3.4 quadrillion British thermal units, representing about 0.7 percent of total world energy consumption. Thailand is a net importer of oil and natural gas; however, the government is promoting ethanol to reduce imports of petroleum and the gasoline additive methyl tertiary butyl ether.

In 2005 Thailand's daily oil consumption of 838,000 barrels per day (133,200 m^{3}/d) exceeded its production of 306,000 barrels per day (48,700 m^{3}/d). Thailand's four oil refineries have a combined capacity of 703,100 barrels per day (111,780 m^{3}/d). The government is considering a regional oil-processing and transportation hub serving south-central China. In 2004, Thailand's natural-gas consumption of 1,055 billion cubic feet (2.99×10^{10} m^{3}) exceeded its production of 790 billion cubic feet (2.2×10^{10} m^{3}).

Thailand's 2004 estimated coal consumption of 30.4 million short tons exceeded its production of 22.1 million. As of January 2007, proven oil reserves totaled 290 million barrels (46,000,000 m^{3}) and proven natural-gas reserves were 14.8 trillion cubic feet (420 km^{3}). In 2003, recoverable coal reserves totalled 1,493 million short tons.

In 2005, Thailand used about 118 billion kilowatt hours of electricity. Consumption rose by 4.7 percent in 2006, to 133 billion kWh. According to the Electricity Generating Authority of Thailand (the national electricity utility), power consumption by residential users is increasing due to more favorable rates for residential customers than for the industry and business sectors. Thailand's electric utility and petroleum companies (also state-controlled) are being restructured.

=== Water supply and sanitation ===
In 2008, 98 percent of the population had access to an improved water source. Ninety-six percent of the population have access to improved sanitation facilities.

=== Science and technology ===
The National Science and Technology Development Agency (NSTDA) is an agency of the government of Thailand which supports research in science and technology and its application in the Thai economy.

=== Services ===
In 2007 the service sector (which includes tourism, banking and finance), contributed 44.7 percent of GDP and employed 37 percent of the workforce. Thailand's service industry is competitive, contributing to its export growth.

==== Banking and finance ====
Dangerous levels of non-performing assets at Thai banks helped trigger an attack on the baht by currency speculators which led to the Asian financial crisis in 1997–1998. By 2003, nonperforming assets had been cut in half (to about 30 percent).

Despite a return to profitability, Thailand's banks continue to struggle with unrealized losses and inadequate capital. The government is considering reforms, including an integrated financial regulatory agency which would enable the Bank of Thailand to focus on monetary policy. In addition, the government is attempting to strengthen the financial sector through the consolidation of commercial, state- and foreign-owned institutions. The 2004 Financial Sector Reform Master Plan provides tax breaks to financial institutions engaging in mergers and acquisitions. The reform program has been deemed successful by outside experts. In 2007 there were three state-owned commercial banks, five state-owned specialized banks, fifteen Thai commercial banks, and seventeen foreign banks in Thailand.

The Bank of Thailand sought to stem the flow of foreign funds into the country in December 2006, leading to the largest one-day drop in stock prices on the Stock Exchange of Thailand since the 1997 Asian financial crisis. The sell-off by foreign investors amounted to more than US$708 million.

In 2019, the Bank of Thailand kept its benchmark interest rate unchanged for a fourth straight meeting, with the concerns of high household debt and financial stability risks. The Monetary Policy Committee cut the policy rate through 2025 and early 2026, and as of mid-2026 has held it at 1.00%.

Thailand's insurance industry is currently valued at approximately US$27 billion (THB 918 billion) as of 2024. Leading insurance companies in the country include Bangkok Insurance, Deves Insurance, Muang Thai Life Assurance, Roojai Insurance and Thai Life Insurance.

Thailand's Ministry of Finance approved four licensed brokers and dealers of cryptocurrencies in the country: Bx, Bitkub, Coins and Satang Pro. The country still did not elaborated regulation for ICOs, though it announced in late 2018 to loosen the rules.

==== Education ====
Education in Thailand is provided mainly by the Thai government through the Ministry of Education from pre-school to senior high school. A free basic education to fifteen years is guaranteed by the Thai constitution. This basic education comprises six years of elementary school and three years of lower secondary school. In addition, three years of pre-school and three years of upper-secondary education is available free of charge, but are non-compulsory.

Children aged 6–12 will go to elementary school (prathom (Thai: ประถม)). From the age of 12, they attend secondary school (matthayom (Thai: มัธยม)). While secondary school also lasts six years, only the first three years are mandatory. After grade 9 (Matthayom 3), pupils can pursue upper-secondary education in a university-preparatory track, or continue their studies in vocational school programs.

Homeschooling is legal in Thailand. Thailand's constitution and education law explicitly recognize alternative education and considers the family to be an educational institution. A homeschool law passed in 2004, Ministerial Regulation No. 3 on the right to basic education by the family, governs homeschooling. Families must submit an application to homeschool and students are assessed annually.

The Human Rights Measurement Initiative finds that Thailand fulfills 69.5% of what they should be able to fulfill for the right to education, based on their level of income.

==== Healthcare ====
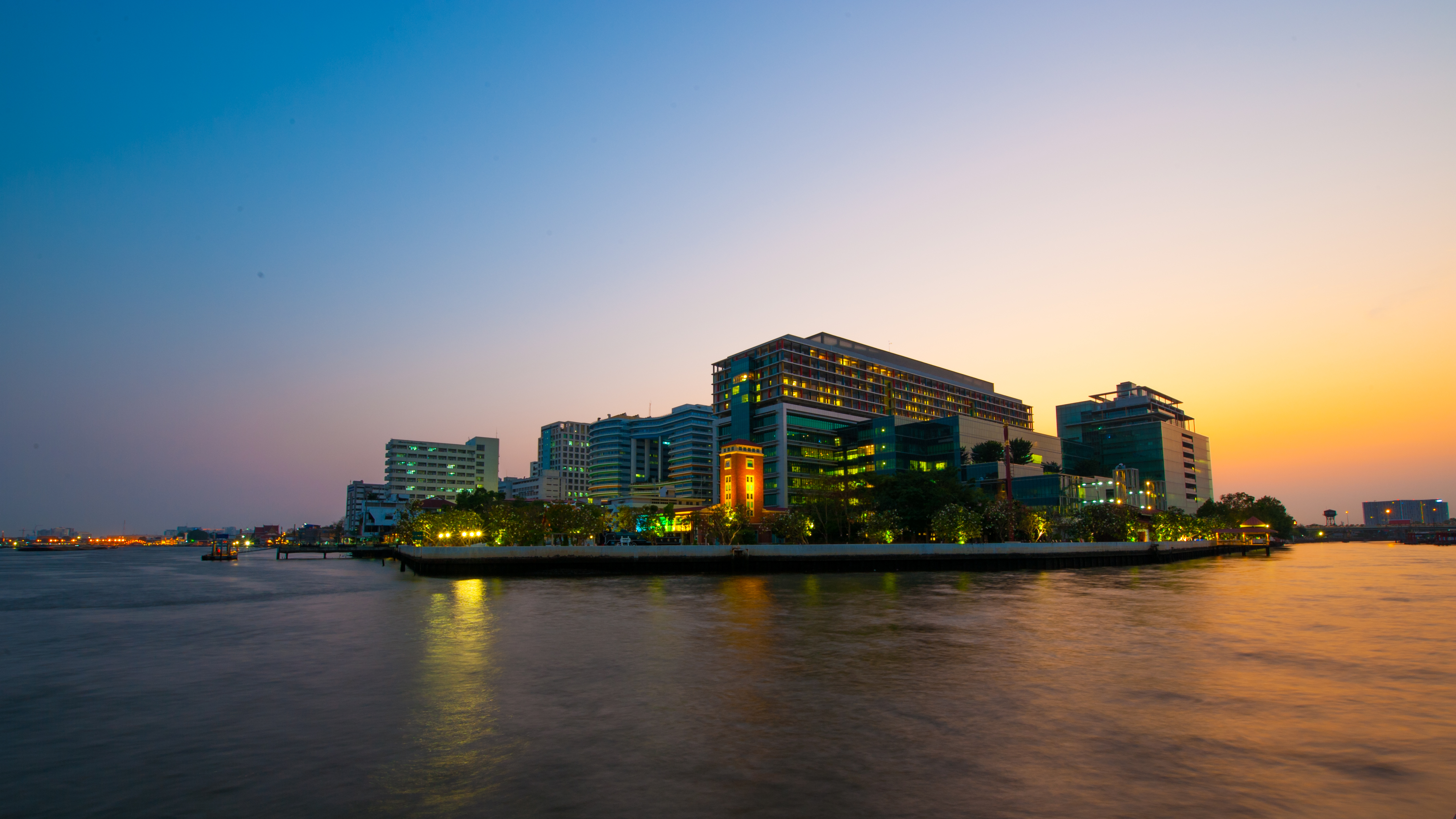
Siriraj Hospital, Bangkok, the oldest and largest hospital in Thailand, also the teaching hospital of the first medical college

Healthcare in Thailand is overseen by the Ministry of Public Health (MOPH), along with several other non-ministerial government agencies. Thailand's network of public hospitals provide universal healthcare to all Thai nationals through three government schemes. Private hospitals help complement the system, especially in Bangkok and large urban areas, and Thailand is among the world's leading medical tourism destinations. However, access to medical care in rural areas still lags far behind that in the cities.

==== Real estate and housing ====
The property market in Thailand, first boomed in the 1980s, this was thanks to a well performing economy, that attracted many people into property investment. A few years later the government encouraged commercial banks to sell their mortgage services and products. Thailand suffered great economic losses during the Asian economic crisis and the market did not regain again until 2000, were the property market saw US$2 billion being invested into Thai property. Property investment prices in Thailand are considerably low compared to other southeast Asian locations, attracting foreign investors, many of which for tourism. For the nationals of Thailand, there are currently commercial banks and government housing banks are dominant in the mortgage lending services with a commercial share of 80-90%. The surge has been observed and analyst believe that Thailand's property market may well be in its infancy. However, in recent years and throughout 2010 there was speculation centered on a potential Thailand condo bubble. Yet Thai authorities claim there is still no sufficient evidence of a property bubble forming in Thailand. Since the Condominium Act of 1979 revised in 2008, it is possible for foreign investors to own a property in a condominium. It greatly boosted foreign investment and stimulated Thailand's real estate market. Recent data shows strong market affinity from Chinese buyers, especially in Chiang Mai, Bangkok and Phuket with China-based property portal Juwai.com estimating a 10% growth in Thailand real estate enquiries for 2019, while good exchange rates plus an upwardly-trending influx of Russian tourists has experts cautioning property developers not to overlook the Russian market.

==== Retail ====
Retail employs more than 6 million Thai workers. Most are employed by small businesses. Large multinational and national retail players (such as Lotus's, 7-Eleven, Siam Makro, Big C, Villa Market, Central Group and The Mall Group) are estimated to employ fewer than 400,000 workers. This accounts for less than seven percent of Thailand's total employment in retail.

==== Telecommunications ====
Modern telecommunications in Thailand began in 1875 with the deployment of the first telegraph service. Historically, the development of telecommunication networks in Thailand were in the hands of the public sector. Government organisations were established to provide telegraph, telephone, radio, and television services, and other government agencies, especially the military, still control a large estate of radio and television spectra. Private telecommunication operators initially acquired concession agreements with state enterprises. For mobile phone services, all the concessions have been amended by successive government to last 25 years have gradually ended in 2015. For other services, the concession terms and conditions vary, ranging from one to fifteen years. Nearly all of the concessions are build-operate-transfer (BOT) contracts. The private investor has to build all the required facilities and transfer them to the state before they can operate or offer services to public.

Liberalisation took place in the 1990s and 2000s. State enterprises, the Telephone Organization of Thailand, Communications Authority of Thailand, and Mass Communication Organization of Thailand, were corporatised in 2003 and 2004. The Constitution of 1997 prompted the institutional changes when it declared that all the spectrum is a "national communication resource for public welfare". The 1997 Constitution further requires the establishment of "an independent regulator" who shall be authorized to allocate spectra and monitor and regulate communications in Thailand. In 1998, to comply with the constitutional mandate, the parliament passed a law establishing two independent regulators, the National Telecommunication Commission (NTC) and the National Broadcasting Commission (NBC). The regulatory practice began in Thailand when the NTC was appointed by the king through the complex nomination procedure in 2005. The inception of NTC automatically terminates and transfers all power and authority in telecommunication sector from the Post and Telegraph Department (PTD) to the newly established independent commission.

The mobile network market is dominated by three large operators who have a market penetration rate of 100 percent. All main mobile operators now utilise GSM/3GPP family technologies including GSM, EDGE, UMTS, and LTE. Thailand has six analogue terrestrial television channels, and 24 commercial digital terrestrial channels began broadcasting in 2014.

Under the Trade Competition Act 2017, which became effective in October 2017, the trade competition authority relinquished its authority to regulate specific sectors including broadcasting and telecommunications businesses. In other words, since the Trade Competition Act 2017 became effective, the broadcasting and telecom sectors that used to be regulated by specific legislation on trade competition have been exempted from complying with general competition laws and are only subject to sectoral regulations on competition. However, although the Trade Competition Act (“TCA”) BE 2560 (2017), states that the TCA does not apply to sectors that have specific legislation (i.e.: Banking, Broadcasting and Telecom), the Telecommunications Business Act (“TBA”) B.E. 2544 (2001) – Section 21 states: “In the telecommunications business operation, other than being subject to the law on trade competition…”. Therefore, a merger in the telecom sector for example, would be under both acts and authorities, because the specific legislation (The Telecommunications Business Act) points back to the law on trade competition.

==== Transport ====
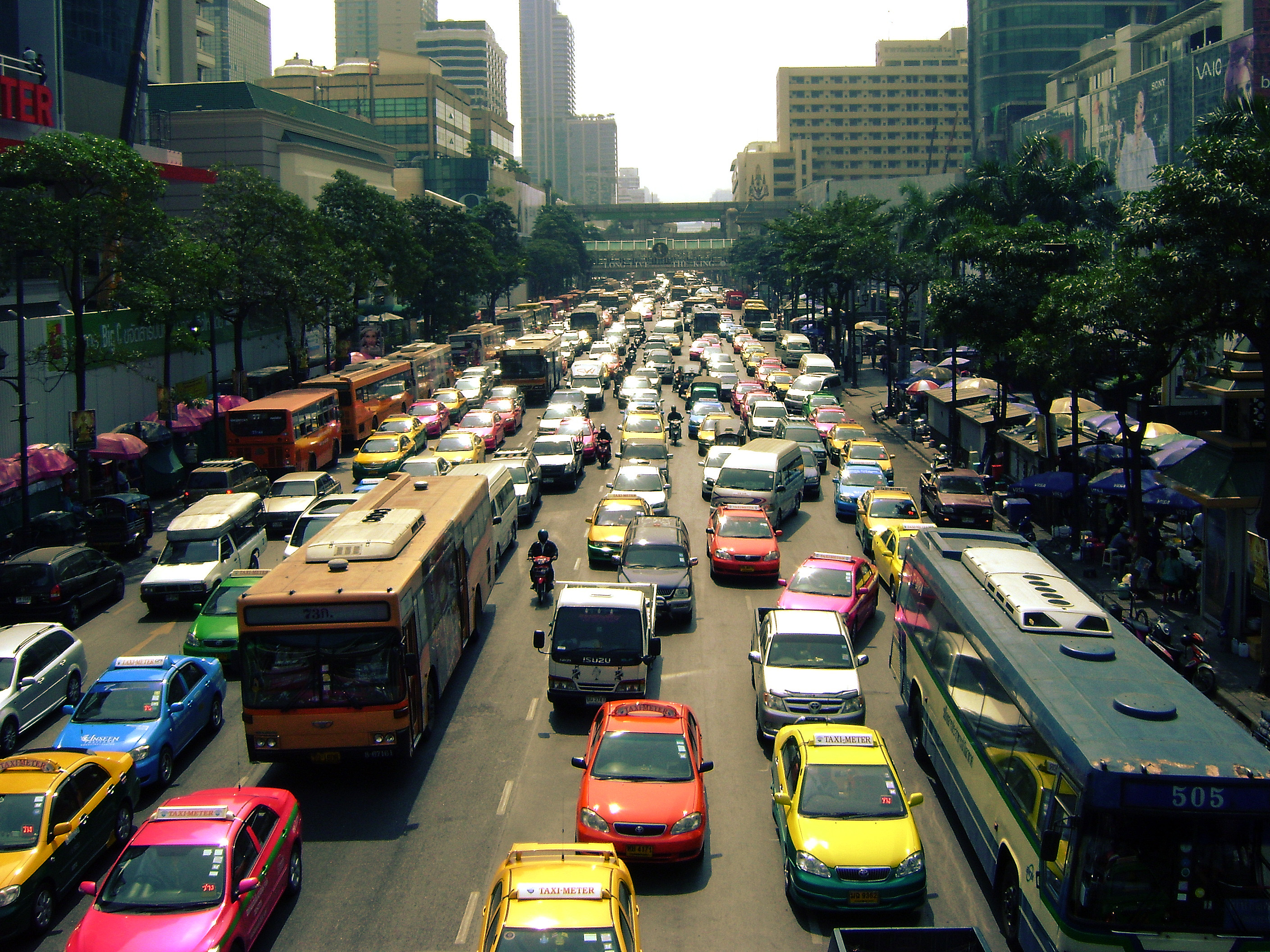
A large number of buses, minibuses and taxis share the streets with private vehicles at Ratchadamri Road, Bangkok.

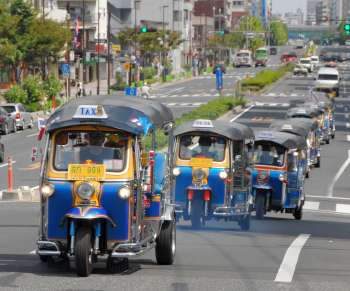
Tuk-tuks are one mode of public transport in Bangkok and other cities in Thailand.

Transport in Thailand is varied, with no one dominant means of transport. For long-distance travel, bus transport dominates. Low-speed rail travel has long been a rural long-distance transport mechanism, though plans are underway to expand services with high-speed rail lines extending to several major regions of Thailand. Road transportation is the primary form of freight transport across the country. Public transportation is underdeveloped, though not as severely as in some other Southeast Asian countries such as Indonesia and the Philippines.

For short trips, motorbikes are common. There are public motorcycle taxis in Bangkok, Pattaya, and other large cities. An overwhelming number of taxis can also be found in Bangkok. Since the country's first rapid rail transit line opened in 1999 in Bangkok, daily ridership on Bangkok's various transit lines has risen to over 800,000, with multiple additional lines either under construction or being proposed.

Private automobiles, whose rapid growth contributed to Bangkok's notorious traffic congestion over the past two decades, have risen in popularity, especially among tourists, expats, the upper class, and the growing middle class. A motorway network across Thailand has gradually been built, with motorways completed in Bangkok and most of central Thailand.

Domestic air transport, which had been dominated by a select few air carriers, saw a surge in popularity since 2010 due in large part to the expanding services of low-cost carriers such as Thai Air Asia and Nok Air.

Areas with navigable waterways often have boats or boat service, and many innovative means of transport exist such as tuk-tuk, vanpool, songthaew, and even elephants in rural areas.

==== Tourism ====
In 2016, tourism revenue, 2.53 trillion baht, accounted for 17.7 percent of Thailand's GDP, up from 16.7 percent in 2015. It is expected to generate 2.71 trillion baht in 2017. The global average for GDP contribution from tourism is nine percent.

== Budget ==
The Kingdom of Thailand's FY2017 budget was 2.733 trillion baht.

In May 2018, the Thai Cabinet approved a FY2019 budget of three trillion baht, up 3.4 percent—100 billion baht—from FY2018. Annual revenue is projected to reach 2.55 trillion baht, up 4.1 percent, or 100 billion baht. Overall, the national budget will face a deficit of 450 billion baht. The cabinet also approved a budget deficit until 2022 in order to drive the economy to a growth of 3.5–4.5 percent a year.

== Labour ==
Thailand's labour force has been estimated at from 36.8 million employed (of 55.6 million adults of working age) to 38.3 million (1Q2016). About 49 percent were employed in agriculture, 37 percent in the service sector and 14 percent in industry. In 2005 women constituted 48 percent of the labour force, and held an increased share of professional jobs. Thailand's unemployment rate was 0.9 percent as of 2014, down from two percent in 2004. A World Bank survey showed that 83.5 percent of the Thai workforce is unskilled.

A joint study by the Quality Learning Foundation (QLF), Dhurakij Pundit University (DPU), and the World Bank suggests that 12 million Thais may lose their jobs to automation over the next 20 years, wiping out one-third of the positions in the workforce. The World Bank estimates that Thai workers are two times and five times less productive than Malaysian and Singaporean workers respectively. The report assesses the average output of Thai workers at US$25,000 (879,200 baht) in 2014 compared to Malaysia's US$50,000 and US$122,000 for Singapore. A 2016 report by the International Labor Office (ILO) estimates that over 70 percent of Thai workers are in danger of being displaced by automation. Factories in Thailand are estimated to be adding from 2,500 to 4,500 industrial robots per year.

In fiscal year 2015, 71,000 Thais worked abroad in foreign countries. Taiwan employed the most Thai employees overall with 59,220 persons, followed by South Korea at 24,228, Israel at 23,479, Singapore at 20,000, and the UAE at 14,000. Most employees work in metal production, agriculture, textile manufacturing, and electronic part manufacturing fields. As of 2020, Thai migrant labourers overseas generate remittances worth 140 billion baht.

The number of migrant workers in Thailand is unknown. The official number—1,339,834 registered migrant workers from Cambodia, Laos, and Myanmar—reported by the Office of Foreign Workers Administration under the Ministry of Labour, represents only legal migrant workers. Many more are presumed to be non-registered or illegal migrants. The Thailand Development Research Institute (TDRI) estimates that there may yet be more illegal migrant workers than legal ones in Thailand.

== Foreign trade ==
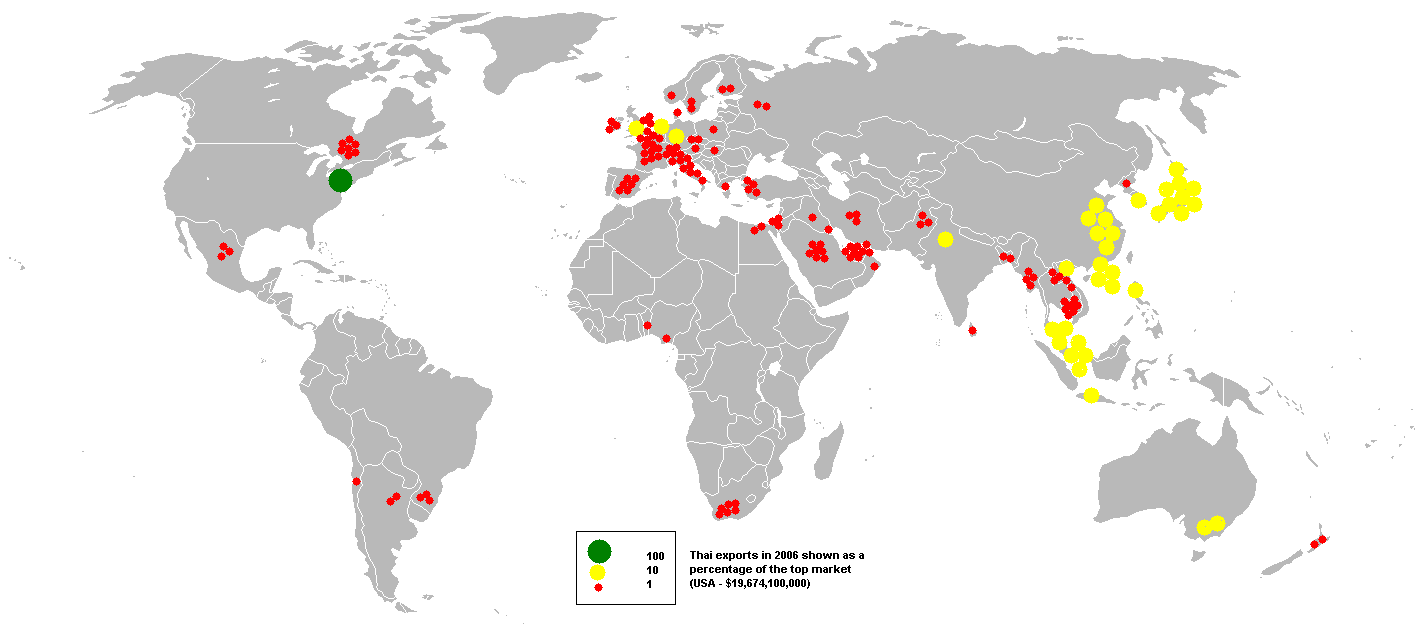
Thai export destinations, 2006.

Exports of Thailand by product category (2019) Chemical products Transportation Machines Mineral products Plastics and rubbers Metals Foodstuffs Precious metals Textiles Instruments Animal products Vegetable products Paper goods Footwear and headwear Miscellaneous Stone and glass Wood products Animal and vegetable bi-products Animal hides Arts and antiques Weapons

As of 2023, the United States was Thailand's largest single-country export market, ahead of China, while China was by a wide margin its largest source of imports. While Thailand's traditional major markets have been North America, Japan, and Europe, economic recovery in Thailand's regional trading partners has helped Thai export growth.

As of 2022, China is Thailand's largest trading partner with 3.69 trillion baht ($106 billion) worth of trade, accounting for almost 20% of all Thai foreign trade. In 2022, China also became the largest foreign investor in Thailand, totaling 77.4 billion baht, more than Japan and USA.

Recovery from financial crisis depended heavily on increased exports to the rest of Asia and the United States. Since 2005 the increase in export of automobiles from Japanese manufacturers (particularly Toyota, Nissan and Isuzu) has helped improve the trade balance, with over one million cars produced annually since then. Thailand has joined the ranks of the world's top ten automobile-exporting nations.

Machinery and parts, vehicles, integrated circuits, chemicals, crude oil, fuels, iron and steel are among Thailand's principal imports. The increase in imports reflects a need to fuel production of high-tech items and vehicles.

Thailand is a member of the World Trade Organization (WTO), the Cairns Group of agricultural exporters and the ASEAN Free Trade Area (AFTA), and has pursued free-trade agreements. A China-Thailand Free Trade Agreement (FTA) began in October 2003. This agreement was limited to agricultural products, with a more comprehensive FTA planned to be signed by 2010. Thailand also has a limited free-trade agreement with India (since 2003) and a comprehensive Australia-Thailand Free Trade Agreement, which began on 1 January 2005.

Thailand began free trade negotiations with Japan in February 2004, and an in-principle agreement was agreed to in September 2005. The Japan–Thailand Economic Partnership Agreement was signed in 2007.

Negotiations for a US-Thailand free trade agreement have been underway, with a fifth round of meetings held in November 2005.

Several industries are restricted to foreign investment by the 1999 Foreign Business Act. These industries include media, agriculture, distribution of land, professional services, tourism, hotels, and construction. Share ownership of companies engaged in these activities must be limited to a 49 percent minority stake. The 1966 US-Thailand Treaty of Amity and Economic Relations provides exemption of these restrictions for shareholders with United States citizenship.

The Bangkok area is one of the most prosperous parts of Thailand and heavily dominates the national economy, with the infertile northeast being the poorest. A concern of successive Thai governments, and a focus of the recently ousted Thaksin government, has been to reduce the regional disparities which have been exacerbated by rapid economic growth in Bangkok and financial crisis.

Although little economic investment reaches other parts of the country except for tourist zones, the government has stimulated provincial economic growth in the eastern seaboard and the Chiang Mai area. Despite talk of other regional development, these three regions and other tourist zones still dominate the national economy.

Although some US rights holders report good cooperation with Thai enforcement authorities (including the Royal Thai Police and Royal Thai Customs), Thailand remained on the priority watch list in 2012. The United States is encouraged that Thailand's government has affirmed its commitment to improving IPR protection and enforcement, but more must be done for Thailand to be removed from the list.

Although the economy has grown moderately since 1999, future performance depends on continued reform of the financial sector, corporate-debt restructuring, attracting foreign investment and increasing exports. Telecommunications, roads, electricity generation and ports showed increasing strain during the period of sustained economic growth. Thailand is experiencing a growing shortage of engineers and skilled technical personnel.

=== Major Trade Partners ===
The following table shows the largest trading partners for Thailand in 2021 by total trade value in billions of USD.

Country	Total Trade Value	Import Value	Export Value	Balance
China	128.24	66.43	61.82	-4.61
United States	65	14.58	50.43	35.85
Japan	61.92	35.57	26.35	-9.22
Malaysia	23.05	12.05	11	-1.05
Australia	17.99	6.42	11.57	5.15
Indonesia	17.37	8.22	9.15	0.93
Singapore	17.15	7.34	9.81	2.46
South Korea	16.9	9.9	7.01	-2.89
Hong Kong	16.51	2.84	13.67	10.84
India	15.08	6.41	8.67	2.26

== Regional economies ==
=== Isan ===
The economy of Isan is dominated by agriculture, although output is poor and this sector is decreasing in importance at the expense of trade and the service sector. Most of the population is poor and badly educated. Many labourers have been driven by poverty to seek work in other parts of Thailand or abroad.

Although Isan accounts for around a third of Thailand's population and a third of its area, it produces only 8.9 percent of GDP. Its economy grew at 6.2 percent per annum during the 1990s.

In 1995, 28 percent of the population was classed as below the poverty line, compared to just 7 percent in central Thailand. In 2000, per capita income was 26,317 baht, compared to 208,434 in Bangkok. Even within Isan, there is a rural/urban divide. In 1995, all of Thailand's ten poorest provinces were in Isan, the poorest being Sisaket. However, most wealth and investment is concentrated in the four major cities of Khorat, Ubon, Udon, and Khon Kaen. These four provinces account for 40 percent of the region's population.

=== Special Economic Zones (SEZ) ===
In his televised national address on 23 January 2015 in the program "Return Happiness to the People", Prime Minister Prayut Chan-o-cha addressed the government's policy on the establishment of special economic zones.

He said that the policy would promote connectivity and regional economic development on a sustainable basis. There are currently 10 SEZs in Thailand, with trade and investment valued at almost 800 billion baht a year.

In 2014, the government launched a pilot project to set up six special economic zones in five provinces: Tak, Mukdahan, Sa Kaeo, Songkhla, and Trat. In the second phase, which is expected to begin in 2016, seven special economic zones will be established in another five provinces: Chiang Rai, Kanchanaburi, Nong Khai, Nakhon Phanom, and Narathiwat.

In early 2015, the government approved an infrastructure development plan in special economic zones. In 2015, the plan includes 45 projects, budgeted at 2.6 billion baht. Another 79 projects, worth 7.9 billion baht, will be carried out in 2016. Relying on a mix of government revenue, bond sales, and other funding, Prayut plans to spend US$83 billion over seven years on new railways, roads, and customs posts to establish cross-border trade routes. The idea is to link some 2.4 billion consumers in China and India with Asia's newest economic grouping, the ASEAN Economic Community, of which Thailand is a member.

Critics of the SEZs maintain that free trade agreements and SEZs are incompatible with the principles of the late-King Bhumibol's sufficiency economy, claimed by the government to be the inspiration for governmental economic and social policies.

== Poverty and inequality ==
The number of Thailand's poor declined from 7.1 million people in 2014 (10.5 percent of the population), to 4.9 million people in 2015 (7.2 percent of the population). Thailand's 2014 poverty line was defined as an income of 2,647 baht per month. For 2015 it was 2,644 baht per month. According to the NESDC in a report entitled, Poverty and Inequality in Thailand, the country's growth in 2014 was 0.8 percent and 2.8 percent in 2015. NESDC Secretary-General Porametee Vimolsiri said that the growth was due to the effect of governmental policies. The report also noted that 10 percent of the Thai population earned 35 percent of Thailand's aggregate income and owned 61.5 percent of its land.

Structural inequality in Thailand is frequently attributed to high levels of market concentration and the dominance of large, family-owned conglomerates in protected domestic sectors. According to research from the Puey Ungphakorn Institute for Economic Research (PIER) of the Bank of Thailand, nearly 47% of total corporate profits in 2017 were generated by firms belonging to interconnected business groups, while the top 5% of firms accounted for approximately 85% of total profits. Some researchers characterize this structure as oligopolistic, and suggest it may create significant barriers to entry for small and medium-sized enterprises (SMEs), potentially limiting social mobility and contributing to income and wealth inequality.

Thailand was ranked as the world's third most unequal nation, behind Russia and India, in the Credit Suisse Global Wealth Databook 2016 (companion volume to the Global Wealth Report 2016), with one percent of the Thai population estimated to own 58 percent of Thailand's wealth.

== Shadow economy ==
According to Friedrich Schneider, an economist at Johannes Kepler University Linz in Austria and author of Hiding in the Shadows: The Growth of the Underground Economy, Thailand's shadow economy ranks globally among the highest. He estimates that Thailand's shadow economy accounted for about 40.9 percent of official GDP in 2014, a figure that includes gambling and small-arms trafficking, but largely excludes narcotics. Schneider defines the shadow economy as market-based legal production that is intentionally concealed to avoid taxes, social-security payments, labour standards or administrative rules. His definition excludes purely illegal activities such as robbery, burglary or drug trafficking. The shadow economy also encompasses widespread loan sharking. Government studies estimate around 200 000 informal lenders operate nationwide, many charging interest rates that place a heavy burden on low-income borrowers.

== See also ==
- List of companies of Thailand
- List of largest companies in Thailand
- List of state enterprises of Thailand
- List of Thai provinces by GPP
- List of Thais by net worth
- Bamboo network
- Tiger Cub Economies
- Indonesia–Malaysia–Thailand Growth Triangle
- MICE in Thailand
- Bank of Thailand
- Office of Insurance Commission
- Stock Exchange of Thailand
- Thailand Board of Investment
- Corruption in Thailand
- Foreign aid to Thailand
- Thailand and the International Monetary Fund
