= Jirayut (name) =

Jirayut or Jirayuth is the romanization of the Thai masculine given names จิรายุทธ and จิรายุส. People with the name include:

- Jirayut, nickname and stage name of Afisan Jehdueramae, Indonesia-based singer
- Jirayut Srupsrisopa, co-founder of cryptocurrency exchange Bitkub
- Jirayut Wattanasin, singer
