= IBF (disambiguation) =

The International Boxing Federation is one of the four major boxing organisations.

IBF may also refer to:

== Businesses ==
- International Banking Facility, a legal entity of a US bank
- Irish Banking Federation, a banking representative body in Ireland

== Sports ==
- International Bandy Federation, former name of Federation of International Bandy (FIB), the international governing body for bandy
- International Badminton Federation, former name of Badminton World Federation (BWF), the international governing body for badminton
- International Bowling Federation
- Iran Basketball Federation, a basketball league in Iran

== Other ==
- Invertible Bloom filter, a probabilistic set data structure
