= Edge Act =

U.S. banking legislation

- Long title: An Act To amend the Federal Reserve Act.
- Enacted by: the 66th United States Congress
- Effective: December 24, 1919

Citations
- Public law: Pub. L. 66–106
- Statutes at Large: 41 Stat. 378

Codification
- Acts amended: Federal Reserve Act

Legislative history
- Introduced in the Senate as S. 2472 by Walter Evans Edge; Passed the Senate on September 3, 1919; Passed the House on November 7, 1919

The Edge Act is a 1919 amendment to the United States Federal Reserve Act of 1913, codified at 12 U.S.C. §§ 611–631, which allows national banks to engage in international banking through subsidiaries chartered by the Board of Governors of the Federal Reserve System. The act is named after Walter Evans Edge, a U.S. Senator from New Jersey who sponsored the original legislation for these types of subsidiaries. The impetus for the act was to give U.S. firms more flexibility to compete with foreign firms.

== Edge Act Corporation (EAC) ==
An Edge Act Corporation is a subsidiary of a bank or bank holding company or financial holding company, that is chartered by the Federal Reserve under Section 25A of the Federal Reserve Act, as amended in 1916 and 1919, to engage in foreign banking activities. The Federal Reserve Board authorizes U.S. and foreign banking and financial organizations to establish Edge Act Corporations. It also regulates and examines the foreign activities of Edge Act Corporations and their subsidiaries. Foreign banks operating in the U.S. are permitted to organize and own an Edge Act Corporation. Prior to 1919, U.S. institutions were not permitted to own foreign banks. An EAC can own branches in the U.S., but may only conduct transactions directly linked to international trade.

=== Structure ===
By virtue of historical developments and funding considerations, an Edge Act Corporation is a domestic subsidiary that is generally held by a U.S. Member Bank; however, it may also be held directly by the bank holding company or financial holding Company. As of the International Banking Act of 1978 (IBA), an Edge Act Corporation may also be held by a Foreign Bank.

=== Types ===
- Banking Edge or Agreement Corporation, which is directly under control of a U.S. member bank or bank holding company, can receive deposits (without Federal Deposit Insurance Corporation coverage) from, and make loans to, companies engaging in international business. This structure allows foreign branches of U.S. banks.
- Investment Edge or Agreement Corporation functions as an investment company, taking equity positions in foreign commercial and industrial organizations;

An Agreement Corporation is chartered by a state to engage in international banking (essentially a state-chartered EAC, so named because the corporation enters into an "agreement" with the Fed's Board of Governors to limit its activities to those of an Edge Act Corporation, as if organized under Section 25A of the Federal Reserve Act. In reality, state supervision is superfluous, so Edge Act Corporations (rather than Agreement Corporations) are the vehicles of choice for international banking and financing operations.

Investment Edges expand the types of companies in which their parent banks may invest. By law, U.S. banks may invest abroad only in other banking organizations. However an Edge Act Corporation may invest in any type of foreign company, as long as it does not engage in business in the United States, including making any domestic loans.

Banking Edges extend the geographic reach of their parents because an Edge was not considered a bank and hence was not subject to the same interstate banking prohibitions. Thus in the 1960s, the trend was for banks from outside the state of New York to form Banking Edges and locate them in New York City for conducting international banking and for trading in foreign exchange. In the 1970s and 1980s, the trend was toward expansion into regional financial centers, such as Miami, Chicago, and San Francisco.

Legislation in the mid-1990s, providing for the removal of Federal Interstate Branching restrictions, undermined the appeal of Banking Edges, and their relative importance in international banking has therefore declined. Major disadvantages of a Banking Edge, compared with an agency, are the smaller size of its loans (due to its smaller capital base, compared with that of the agency's parent bank) and the limitation of domestic lending ability to international or foreign business transactions. Of the 82 Edge and Agreement Corporations in operation at year-end 1999, 27 were Banking Edges located mostly in New York City and Miami with total assets of $18 billion.

=== Largest Edges ===
As of 1999, the three largest Edges were all holding companies under the Federal Reserve Regulatory District of New York.

- HSBC International Finance Corporation, an Investment Edge (Wilmington, Delaware)

HSBC Holdings plc (London)

- Citibank International, a Banking Edge (Miami)

Citigroup Inc. (New York)

- Banco Santander International, a Banking Edge (Miami)

Banco Santander Central Hispano, S.A. (Madrid)

In 1999, these institutions accounted for 81.6 percent of all assets (source: Board of Governors, Federal Reserve System).

In official documents, reference to an Edge Act Corporation typically mentions the state or city where it is domiciled.

== See also ==
- International Banking Facility
