= Offshore bank =

Bank located outside the country of residence of the depositor

An offshore bank is a bank that is operated and regulated under international banking license (often called offshore license), which usually prohibits the bank from establishing any business activities in the jurisdiction of establishment. Due to less regulation and transparency, accounts with offshore banks were often used to hide undeclared income. Since the 1980s, jurisdictions that provide financial services to nonresidents on a big scale can be referred to as offshore financial centres. OFCs often also levy little or no corporation tax and/or personal income but impose high direct taxes such as duty, making the cost of living high.

With worldwide increasing measures on CTF (combatting the financing of terrorism) and AML (anti-money laundering) compliance, the offshore banking sector in most jurisdictions was subject to changing regulations. Since 2002 the Financial Action Task Force issues the so-called FATF blacklist of "Non-Cooperative Countries or Territories" (NCCTs), which it perceived to be non-cooperative in the global fight against money laundering and terrorist financing.

An account held in a foreign offshore bank is often described as an offshore account. Typically, an individual or company will maintain an offshore account for the financial and legal advantages it provides, including but not limited to:

- Strong privacy, including bank secrecy.
- Little or no corporate taxation via tax havens.
- Protection against local, political, or financial instability.

While the term originates from the Channel Islands being "offshore" from the United Kingdom, and while most offshore banks are located in island nations to this day, the term is used figuratively to refer to any bank used for these advantages, regardless of location. Thus, some banks in landlocked Andorra, Luxembourg, and Switzerland may be described as "offshore banks".

Offshore banking has previously been associated with the underground economy and organized crime, tax evasion and money laundering; however, legally, offshore banking does not prevent assets from being subject to personal income tax on interest. Except for certain people who meet fairly complex requirements (such as perpetual travelers), the personal income tax laws of many countries (e.g., France, and the United States) make no distinction between interest earned in local banks and that earned abroad. Persons subject to US income tax, for example, are required to declare, on penalty of perjury, any foreign bank accounts—which may or may not be numbered bank accounts—they may have. Offshore banks are now required to report income to many other tax authorities, although Switzerland and certain other jurisdictions retain bank secrecy regimes that can be more difficult to deal with. This does not make the non-declaration of the income by the taxpayer or the evasion of the tax on that income legal and many OFCs have recently been important colleagues to onshore tax authorities and law enforcement against wrongdoers. Following the 9/11 attacks, there have been many calls to increase regulation on international finance, in particular concerning offshore banks, OFCs, crypto currency and clearing houses such as Clearstream, based in Luxembourg, which are possible crossroads for major illegal money flows. Most criminality involving the banking system has happened because of the regulations and controls being circumvented.

== Offshore banking comparison by jurisdictions ==
The most popular offshore financial centres are in jurisdictions with a history of political and economic stability. In terms of offshore banking centres and in terms of total deposits, the global market is dominated by the US, Switzerland and the Cayman Islands. A letter by the District Attorney of New York, Robert Mitt. Morgenthau, published by The New York Times, states that the Cayman Islands has US$1.9 trillion on deposit in 281 banks, including 40 of the world's top 50 banks, although official statistics published by the Cayman Islands Monetary Authority suggest the amounts held on deposit are actually around US$1.5 trillion. Numerous other offshore jurisdictions also provide offshore banking to a greater or lesser degree. In particular, Jersey, Guernsey, and the Isle of Man are also known for their well regulated banking infrastructure. Some offshore jurisdictions have steered their financial sectors away from offshore banking, thinking it was difficult to properly regulate and liable to give rise to financial scandal.

=== Weakened bank secrecy ===
Since starting to survey offshore jurisdictions on April 2, 2009, the Organisation for Economic Co-operation and Development (OECD) at the forefront of a crackdown on tax evasion, will not object to governments using stolen bank data to track down tax evasion using offshore centers, such as in the 2008 Liechtenstein tax affair. The recent sharing of confidential UBS bank details about 285 clients suspected of willful tax evasion by the United States Internal Revenue Service was ruled a violation of both Swiss law and the country's constitution by a Swiss federal administrative court. Nevertheless, OECD has removed 18 countries, including Switzerland, Liechtenstein and Luxembourg, from a so-called "grey list" of countries that did not offer sufficient tax transparency, and has re-categorized them as "white list" countries. Countries that do not comply may face sanctions.

A notable exception is Panama, whose canal provides it with a unique type of immunity to international pressure. Given the enlargement of the canal to accommodate larger shipping, it is unlikely that Panama would succumb in the foreseeable future to international pressure toward transparency.

== Scope of offshore banking ==
Offshore banking constitutes a sizable portion of the international financial system. Some experts believe that as much as half the world's capital flows through offshore centers. OFCs are said to have 1.2% of the world's population and hold 26% of the world's wealth, including 31% of the net profits of United States multinationals. A group of activists state that £13-20 trillion is held in offshore accounts yet the real figure could be much higher when taking into account Chinese, Russian and US deployment of capital internationally. These often regurgitated figures have not stood up to scrutiny however, and nor has the black hole theory that capital is hoarded away from the financial and tax systems in OFCs. Much like a criminal using a wallet identified and seized as proceeds of crime, it would be counterintuitive for anyone to hold assets unused. Moreover, much of the capital flowing through vehicles in the OFCs is aggregated investment capital from pension funds, institutional and private investors which has to be deployed in industry around the World.

Trillions in deposits and securities are held in offshore banks, mostly by international business companies (IBCs) and trusts. Among offshore banks, Swiss banks hold an estimated 35% of the world's private and institutional funds (or 3 trillion Swiss francs), and the Cayman Islands (over 2 trillion US dollars in deposits) are the fifth largest banking centre globally in terms of deposits. However, data by the Swiss National Bank show that the assets held by foreign persons in Swiss bank accounts declined by 28.1% between January 2008 and November 2009.

== Banking advantages ==
- Offshore banks provide access to politically and economically stable jurisdictions. This will be an advantage for residents of areas where there is a risk of political turmoil, who fear their assets may be frozen, seized or disappear (see the corralito for example, during the 2001 1998–2002 Argentine great depression). However, it is also the case that onshore banks offer the same advantages in terms of stability.
- Some offshore banks may operate with a lower cost base and can provide higher interest rates than the legal rate in the home country due to the narrow range of services provided and technological advancements along similar lines to challenger banks such as Revolut and Starling. Advocates of offshore banking often characterize government regulation as a form of tax on domestic banks, reducing interest rates on deposits. However, this is scarcely true now; most offshore countries offer very similar interest rates to those that are offered onshore and the offshore banks now have considerable compliance requirements making certain categories of customers (those from the US or from higher risk profile countries) unattractive for different reasons.
- Offshore finance is one of the few industries, along with tourism, in which geographically remote island countries can competitively engage. It can help developing countries source investment and create growth in their economies, and can help redistribute world finance to and from the developed and developing worlds. Equally, well-resourced and developed OFC countries such as New Zealand and Singapore offer a safe and reasonably-well administered background for these similar financial services.
- Interest is generally paid by offshore banks without tax being deducted. This is an advantage to individuals who do not pay tax on worldwide income, or who do not pay tax until the tax return is agreed, or who feel that they can illegally evade tax by hiding the interest incomes. FATCA and CRS and other reporting mechanisms make the latter more difficult other than for the most blatant criminals.
- Some offshore banks offer banking services that may not be available from domestic banks such as anonymous bank accounts, higher or lower rate loans based on risk and investment opportunities not available elsewhere. The number of jurisdictions offering anonymous accounts (or bearer shares) has fallen considerably in the last 20 years.
- Offshore banking is often linked to other corporate structures, such as offshore companies, trusts or foundations, which may have specific uses and may still have tax advantages and bank security solutions incorporated in particular jurisdictions.

== Banking disadvantages ==
- Offshore bank accounts are sometimes less financially secure than domestic ones in recent times. For example, in the banking crisis which swept the world in 2008, some savers lost funds that were not insured by the country in which they were deposited. Those who had deposited with the same banks onshore received all of their money back. In 2009, The Isle of Man authorities were keen to point out that 90% of the claimants were paid, although this only referred to the number of people who had received money from their depositor compensation scheme and not the amount of money refunded. In reality, only 40% of depositor funds had been repaid: 24.8% in September 2009 and 15.2% in December 2009. Switzerland, Luxembourg and other offshore jurisdictions now often have some form of compensation scheme.

Both offshore and onshore banking centres often have depositor compensation schemes. For example: The Isle of Man compensation scheme guarantees £50,000 of net deposits per individual depositor, or £20,000 for most other categories of depositor. Potential depositors should be aware that any deposits over the guaranteed amount are at risk. However, only offshore centres such as the Isle of Man have refused to compensate depositors 100% of their funds following bank collapses. Onshore depositors have been refunded in full, regardless of what the compensation limit of that country has stated. Thus, banking offshore is historically riskier than banking onshore.

- Offshore banking has been associated in the past with the underground economy and organized crime, thanks to movies such as the Firm through money laundering. Following September 11, 2001, offshore banks, onshore banks along with clearing houses, have been accused of helping various organized crime gangs, terrorist groups, and other state or non-state actors. However, offshore banking is a legitimate financial service used by many expatriate and international workers.
- Offshore jurisdictions can be remote, and therefore costly to visit, so physical access can be difficult. This problem has been alleviated to a considerable extent with the advent and realization of online banking as a practical system.
- Offshore private banking is usually more accessible to those with higher incomes, because of the costs of establishing and maintaining offshore accounts. However, simple savings accounts can be opened by anyone and maintained with scale fees equivalent to their onshore counterparts. The tax burden in developed countries thus falls disproportionately on middle-income groups. Historically, tax cuts have tended to result in a higher proportion of the tax take being paid by high-income groups in doubles from time to time, as previously sheltered income is brought back into the mainstream economy. The Laffer curve demonstrates this tendency.
- The US Bank Secrecy Act requires U.S. Taxpayers to file a Department of the Treasury Form 90–22.1 Report of Foreign Bank and Financial Accounts (FBAR: Each person or entity (including a bank) subject to the jurisdiction of the United States having an interest in, signature, or other authority over one or more bank, securities, or other financial accounts in a foreign country must file an FBAR if the aggregate value of such accounts at any point in a calendar year exceeds $10,000. (31 CFR 103.24). A recent District Court case in the 10th Circuit may have significantly expanded the definition of "interest in" and "other Authority".
- Offshore bank accounts are sometimes touted as the solution to every legal, financial, and asset protection strategy, but the benefits are often exaggerated as in the more prominent jurisdictions, the level of Know Your Customer evidence required underplayed.

== Banking services ==
It is possible to obtain the full spectrum of financial services from offshore banks, including:

- Savings accounts
- Corporate administration
- Credit
- Deposit taking
- Foreign exchange
- Fund management
- Investment management and investment custody
- Debit and Credit Cards
- Letters of credit and trade finance
- Trustee services
- Wire- and electronic funds transfers

Not every bank provides each service. Banks tend to polarise between retail services and private banking services. Retail services tend to be low-cost and undifferentiated, whereas private banking services tend to bring a personalised suite of services to the client.

=== Scale of potential tax revenue ===
Activists have stated that even just the lower estimate of £13 trillion on deposit in offshore accounts, if these assets earned an average 3% a year in income for their owners taxable at 30%, then the offshore funds would generate £121 billion in tax revenues, on the unrealistic assumption that no tax is paid (i.e. no one pays any tax on offshore holdings), and the equally curious narrative that 100% of those deposits would otherwise have been liable to tax. Projections are often predicated upon levying tax on the capital sums held in offshore accounts, whereas most national systems of taxation tax income and/or capital gains rather than accrued wealth. Much of the capital held in offshore banks is taxed already at source and where the capital represents profits, is reportable by the beneficial owner and will be taxed according to that owner’s tax residence. Capital is always deployed in investments which also then generates further tax revenue on those activities that have been invested in onshore.

=== Ownership ===
According to Merrill Lynch and Capgemini's “World Wealth Report” for 2000, one third of the wealth of the world's “high-net-worth individuals” — nearly $6 trillion out of $17.5 trillion — may now be held offshore. A large portion, £6.3tn, of offshore assets, is owned by only a tiny sliver, 0.001% (around 92,000 super wealthy individuals) of the world's population. In simple terms, this reflects the inconvenience associated with establishing these accounts, not that these accounts are only for the wealthy. Most all individuals can take advantage of these accounts.

== Money laundering ==
The IMF has said that between $600 billion and $1.5 trillion of illicit money is laundered annually, equal to 2% to 5% of global economic output. Today, most of the world's drug money is allegedly laundered through offshore and lesser regulated jurisdictions such as Paraguay and the UAE and even the US, estimated at up to $500 billion a year, more than the total income of the world's poorest 20%. Add the proceeds of tax evasion and the figure increases significantly. Another few hundred billion may come from fraud and corruption. "These offshore centers awash in money are the hub of a colossal, underground network of crime, fraud, and corruption" commented Lucy Komisar quoting these statistics.^{[1]} In cases such as the 1MDB scandal, the HSBC scandal and a host of Ponzi schemes including Bernard L Madoff Investment Securities, it has been demonstrated that a mixture of onshore and offshore individuals conspiring together to either turn a blind eye or actively collaborate in order for large scale fraud and money laundering to succeed. Some have been jailed and fined, some banks have closed yet other key actors remain relatively unscathed. Large fraud cases invariably involved the major global retail banks and real estate in the major onshore or mid shore financial centres in order for the criminals to launder the proceeds of crime into safer jurisdictions and the global financial system as a whole.

The New York Times, The Wall Street Journal, and The Los Angeles Times revealed that the United States government, specifically the US Treasury Department and the CIA, had a program to access the SWIFT transaction database after the September 11 attacks (see the Terrorist Finance Tracking Program) further diminishing the value of offshore banking for keeping Illicit activity secret.

== Regulation of international banks ==
In the 21st century, regulation of offshore banking has increased exponentially but not evenly, although critics usually focus on the wrong areas. The quality of the regulation is monitored by supra-national bodies such as the International Monetary Fund (IMF). Banks are generally required to maintain capital adequacy in accordance with international standards. They must report at least quarterly to the regulator on the current state of the business.

Since the late 1990s, especially following September 11, 2001, there have been a number of initiatives to increase the transparency of offshore banking, although critics such as the Association for the Taxation of Financial Transactions for the Aid of Citizens (ATTAC) non-governmental organization (NGO) maintain that they have been insufficient. A few examples of these are:

- The tightening of anti-money laundering regulations in many countries including most popular offshore banking locations means that bankers and other service providers are required by law to report suspicion of money laundering to the local police authority, regardless of banking secrecy rules. There is more international co-operation between police authorities.
- In the US the Internal Revenue Service (IRS) introduced Qualifying Intermediary requirements, which mean that the names of the recipients of US-source investment income are passed to the IRS.
- Following 9/11 the US introduced the USA PATRIOT Act, which authorizes the US authorities to seize the assets of a bank, where it is believed that the bank holds assets for a suspected criminal. Similar measures have been introduced in some other countries.
- The European Union has introduced sharing of information between certain jurisdictions, and enforced this in respect of certain controlled centers, such as the UK Offshore Islands, so that tax information is able to be shared in respect of interest.
- The Bank Secrecy Act requires that Taxpayers file an FBAR for accounts outside of the United States that have balances in excess of $10,000
- FATCA (the Foreign Account Tax Compliance Act) became law in 2010 and "targets tax non-compliance by US taxpayers with foreign accounts [and] focuses on reporting by US taxpayers about certain foreign financial accounts and offshore assets [and] foreign financial institutions about financial accounts held by U.S. taxpayers or foreign entities in which U.S. taxpayers hold a substantial ownership interest."

Joseph Stiglitz, 2001 Nobel laureate for economics and former World Bank Chief Economist, told to reporter Lucy Komisar, investigating on the Clearstream scandal:

"You ask why, if there's an important role for a regulated banking system, do you allow a non-regulated banking system to continue? It's in the interest of some of the moneyed interests to allow this to occur. It's not an accident; it could have been shut down at any time. If you said the US, the UK, the major G7 banks will not deal with offshore bank centers that don't comply with G7 banks regulations, these banks could not exist. They only exist because they engage in transactions with standard banks."^{[1]}

== See also ==
- Bank secrecy
- Banking in Singapore
- Banking in Switzerland
- Corporate haven
- International Banking Facility
- List of finance topics
- Private bank
- Tax haven
- Dominica
- Citibank IPB Singapore
- Panama Papers
