= Foreign aid to Thailand =

On July 31, 2003, Thailand repaid its outstanding obligations under a standby arrangement made with the International Monetary Fund designed to help it recover from the 1997 Asian financial crisis. The payment was made four years ahead of schedule, reflecting Thailand's achievement of macroeconomic and balance-of-payments stability.

Since 2002, Thailand has no longer been an Economic aid recipient. Instead, Thailand contributed $60 million in economic aid to the neighboring countries in 2005.

== Foreign aid history ==
During the Vietnam War period Thailand, along with other US allies such as Cambodia, received considerable amounts of US economic aid and military subsidies.

From the early 1980s onwards, internal problems in Myanmar have led to large numbers of people seeking refuge in Thailand. Various agencies, including the European Commission's Humanitarian Aid department, have helped to assist the displaced people.

Historically, Thailand was one of the biggest recipients of Japanese overseas aid. The bulk of the aid took the form of loans for large-scale infrastructure projects. Japan's government explained its relative generosity by citing friendly relations and Thailand's special problems arising from rapid growth, while some scholars have suggested that Japan's own business interests were the main motivation.

== See also ==
- SUMERNET
