= Thailand and the International Monetary Fund =

Thailand joined the IMF on May 3, 1949 and has been the recipient of numerous IMF programs, most notably in its role as the source of contagion in the 1997 Asian financial crisis. Thailand currently has a quota of 3,211.9 million SDR's, which gives it the second most voting power in its constituency after Turkey. The IMF opened a technical assistance office in Thailand in 2012 to provide technical assistance and training to the Lao PDR and the Republic of the Union of Myanmar.

== IMF Involvement in the 1980's ==
During the span between 1973 and 1985, Thailand experienced a 36% fall in trade, stagnating GDP growth, sharp inflation, and increasing current account deficit coupled with increasing external debt. In order to counter this trend, Thailand entered into IMF backed adjustment program in which it devalued its currency while implementing stricter fiscal policies. The structural changes that this period of adjustment implemented resulted in 10 years of strong economic performance. Between 1987 and 1989, the GDP grew at over 10%, inflation dropped to just 5 percent, and current account deficit was less than 3% of the GDP. Despite this, some argue that the short-term focused structural changes in the 1980s were the catalysts for Thailand's economic crisis just 10 years later in 1997. Specifically, most of the growth in the ten years following the 1983 IMF adjustments were in the non-tradable sector rather than the export-oriented tradable sector. Furthermore, the IMF adjustments cut infrastructure investment from 8.9% of total GDP to just 5.2% in 1989.

== IMF Involvement during the Asian Financial Crisis ==
In 1997, Thailand faced an economic crisis stemming from a variety of pressures. During the ten-year span between 1987 and 1997, Thailand's current account deficit continued to grow. By 1996, the deficit had grown to 7.887% of the total GDP. During this same period, foreign direct investment increased sharply as continuing currency devaluations, first in the 1980s and then as an effect of the Plaza Accord. Real estate investors overestimated the demand for real estate and used the Bangkok International Banking Facility's relatively cheap loans on construction projects that were left vacant due to lower demand than initially thought. Predicting further currency devaluation, speculators launched a series of attacks on the Thai Baht. The Thai government initially attempted to protect the Baht by buying it back and expending its international reserves, but was ultimately forced to float the currency. In August 1997, the IMF unveiled a relief package for Thailand that would offer a total of 17.2 billion US dollar's worth of bilateral and multilateral assistance. The initial period of policy-making was designed to manage the baht's floating exchange rates, restructure Thai financial institutions, cut public expenditures, promote the private sector, and to attract more foreign capital. The IMF's conditionality for the Thai bailout is characterized by monetary policy reform, fiscal policy reform, and financial sector reform.

Under Thailand's former finance minister, Tarrin Nimmanahaeminda, Thailand's financial sector restructuring began with the liquidation of insolvent finance companies and resulted in the closure of 56 bankrupt finance companies. The government intervened in weak banks and the banking system was recapitalized. In 1998, the banks who received government intervention were privatized, assets were disposed of, and corporate debt was restructured. Bankruptcy law, foreclosure procedures, and foreign investment restrictions were all reformed. Fiscal policy initially demanded a surplus of 1 percent of GDP at the outset of the crisis, but by February 1998 switched its target to a small deficit of 2 percent of GDP. Finally, monetary policy attempted to stabilize the exchange rate while helping Thailand recover from the crisis.

== IMF Capacity Development Office Thailand ==
The IMF opened a Technical Assistance Office in Thailand (TAOLAM) in September 2012 to provide support for Laos and Myanmar, and now also covers Cambodia and Vietnam on a project-by-project basis. Thailand and Japan donate to the upkeep of this office, and the Bank of Thailand hosts the office. The office offers resident project technical advisers in macroeconomic management, public financial management, regional treasury management, monetary and foreign exchange operations, government finance statistics, and external sector statistics. This office works closely with the IMF-Singapore Regional Training Institute (STI) and the Regional Office for Asia and the Pacific in Tokyo (OAP). On September 10, 2018, TAOLAM was renamed to the IMF Capacity Development Office in Thailand (CDOT). The name change reflects the complementary role that training plays with technical assistance, as the two pillars of capacity development at the IMF. The principal objective of CDOT has remained to strengthen capacity in macroeconomic management and statistics in support of countries’ reform priorities. CDOT's activities are made possible through direct financial support from the Government of Japan and an in-kind contribution from the Bank of Thailand.
