= International Banking Facility =

An International Banking Facility (IBF) is a separate account established by a U.S. bank, or a US branch/subsidiary of a foreign bank, or an Edge Act Corporation in the United States to offer services to only non-US residents and institutions. The services offered include deposit and loan services. (Note, an IBF is not necessarily a separate legal entity.)

Banks may maintain IBFs in their existing quarters, but the IBF's accounting must be separate from the bank's main books. Deposit and loan services provided by IBFs are free of Federal Reserve System reserve requirements, and are not insured by the Federal Deposit Insurance Corporation. Thus, deposits may earn greater interest than deposits made by U.S. residents.

The IBF concept was initially proposed to the Federal Reserve Board of Governors by the New York Clearing House association in July 1978. It took until June 18, 1981 until the Board of Governors approved establishment of IBFs from December 3. IBFs were established to attract some of the money flowing out to offshore banking centers.

In the early 1980s, New York competed with other states, such as Florida, to attract IBF business. For instance, New York exempted the income of an IBF from New York bank franchise tax. Florida, in turn, exempted the income of Florida IBFs from Florida corporate income tax and also allowed Florida IBFs to deduct their losses.

== See also ==
- Banking institution
- Offshore bank
