= Bitkub =

Thailand-based cryptocurrency exchange

- Type: Private
- Industry: Bitcoin; Technology; Cryptocurrency; Blockchain
- Founded: February 5, 2018; 8 years ago
- Founder: Jirayut Srupsrisopa
- Headquarters: Bangkok, Thailand
- Number of employees: 500+
- Website: https://www.bitkub.com/

Bitkub is a Thailand-based cryptocurrency exchange operated by Bitkub Online Co., Ltd. (Thai: บริษัทบิทคับ ออนไลน์ จำกัด) under its parent group Bitkub Capital Group Holdings (Bitkub Capital Co., Ltd.). The company was founded in 2018 by Jirayut Srupsrisopa and was among the first exchanges to receive a digital asset license from Thailand’s Securities and Exchange Commission (SEC) in 2019.

== History ==
Jirayut Srupsrisopa, co-founder and CEO of Bitkub Capital, was among Thailand’s early entrepreneurs in the cryptocurrency sector. Before establishing Bitkub, he co-founded the Bitcoin wallet operator Coins.co.th, a partner of Philippines-based Coins.ph, which was acquired by Go-Jek in 2019.

Bitkub was founded in February 2018 with a registered capital of 50 million baht, reportedly backed by mobile operator DTAC. By the end of the year, it had become Thailand’s second-largest digital currency exchange, after BX.in.th.

In January 2019, Bitkub was among the first four exchanges to receive operating licenses from the Securities and Exchange Commission (SEC), following the Ministry of Finance’s regulation of digital asset services.

According to media reports, Bitkub’s revenue increased from 3 million baht in 2018 to 30 million in 2019 and 300 million in 2020, reaching 3.28 billion during the first three quarters of 2021. The exchange reportedly benefited from the closure of BX.in.th in 2019 and the increased interest in cryptocurrency trading during the late-2020 Bitcoin price surge. However, the surge in trading volume caused several system outages in January 2021, leading to a temporary suspension of services. The SEC instructed Bitkub to resolve its technical issues. The regulator also ordered a suspension of new user registrations until Bitkub demonstrated system stability; the restriction was lifted in April 2021.

In November 2021, Siam Commercial Bank Group announced an agreement to acquire a 51% stake in Bitkub Online for 17.85 billion baht (approximately $535 million), valuing Bitkub at over $1 billion. The deal was later canceled in August 2022 after unresolved regulatory concerns.

Bitkub has stated its intention to expand into other Southeast Asian markets.

In December 2021, the SEC fined Bitkub a total of 3.9 million baht for eight violations, including system disruptions, inadequate customer support, non-compliance with trading rules, and improper handling of customer assets.
