= Kaeng, Det Udom =

Coordinates: 14.709818°N 105.017982°E

Kaeng แก้ง
- Subdistrict
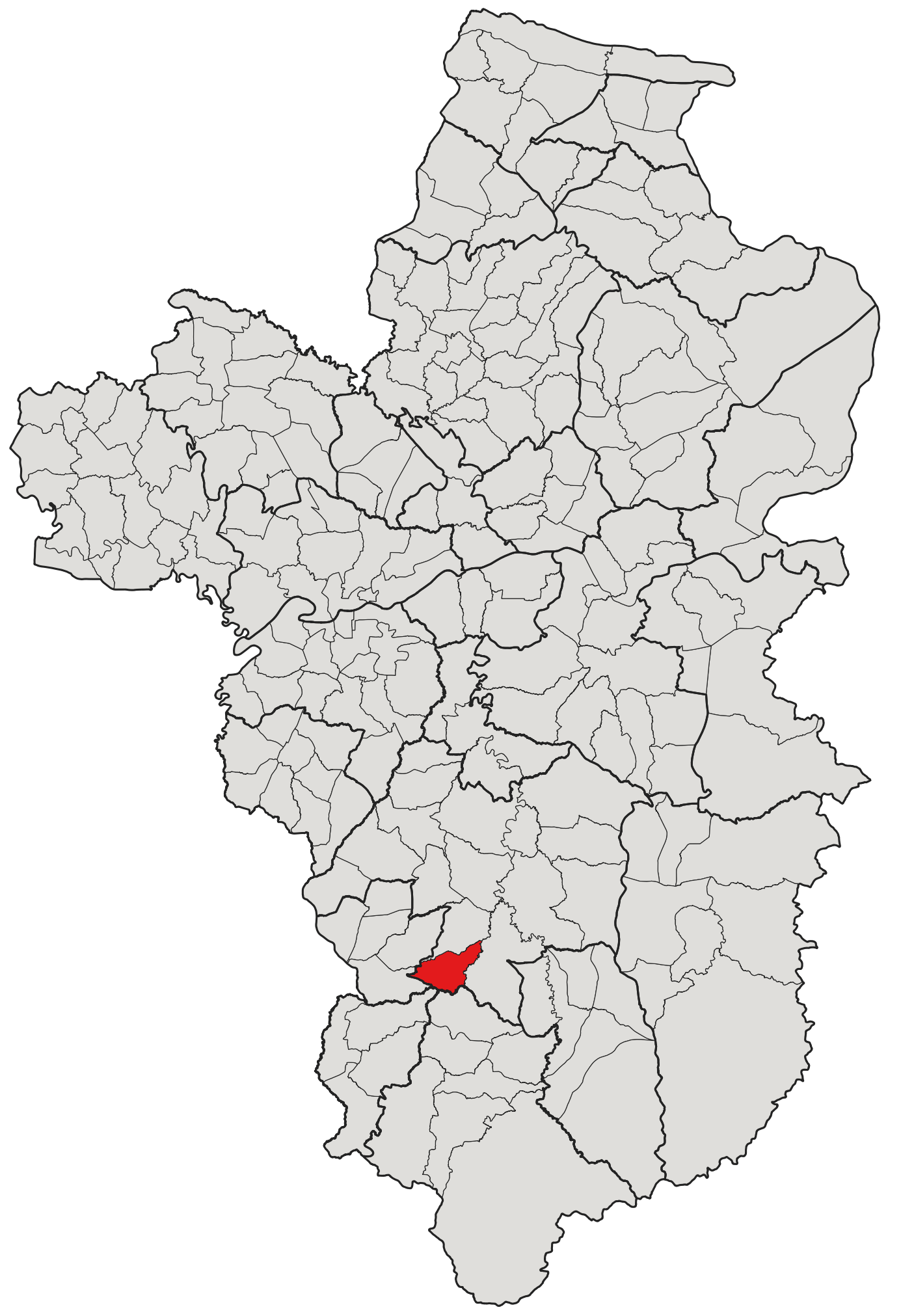
- Subdistrict location in Ubon Ratchathani province
- Country: Thailand
- Province: Ubon Ratchathani
- District: Det Udom
- Mubans: 10
- Number of Mu: 11
- Subdistrict established: 1919

Area
  - Total: 42 km^{2} (16 sq mi)

Population (2021)
  - Total: 8,312
  - Density: 197.9/km^{2} (513/sq mi)
- Time zone: UTC+7 (ICT)
- Postal code: 34160

Kaeng (Thai: แก้ง) is a tambon (subdistrict) located in the southern region of Det Udom District, in Ubon Ratchathani Province, Thailand. In 2021, it had a population of 8,312 people. Neighbouring subdistricts are (clockwise from the south) Yang, Khilek, Kut Ruea, Na Kasem, Non Sombun, and Top Hu.

== History ==
The area was settled by the villagers evacuated from Warin Chamrap, Samrong, and Kanthararom; the first subdistrict's village, Kaeng, gained subdistrict status in 1919. The territory, in addition to the present Kaeng subdistrict, included the current Thung Si Udom district, Thung Thoeng, as well as some portions of Na Krasaeng.

In 1961, the northwestern region, which consisted of six villages, was split off to form a new subdistrict, Thung Thoeng, by combining with seven other villages divided from Som Sa-at. A newly established subdistrict, Thung Thoeng, was additionally divided to create two new tambons, Nong Om and Khok Chamrae, in 1969 and 1991, respectively. Both of them are currently in the Thung Si Udom district.

In 1979, the other seven villages in the northwestern region were also split off to create a new administrative division, Na Kasem, currently governed by the Thung Si Udom district.

In 1985, seven villages in the western region were cut off to form a new subdistrict, Kut Ruea, currently in the Thung Si Udom district.

In 1993, a new subdistrict, Non Sombun, was formed by splitting of nine villages in the northern area.

== Geography ==
The tambon is located in the southern region of the Det Udom district, on the low river plain of the Lam Dom Yai River.

== Administration ==
The Kaeng subdistrict is divided into 10 administrative villages (mubans; หมู่บ้าน), one of which, Kaeng villages, was further divided into two community groups (Mu; หมู่). The entire area is governed by the Subdistrict Administrative Organization of Kaeng (องค์การบริหารส่วนตำบลแก้ง; Kaeng SAO).

As of the 2021 census, it had a population of 8,312 people with 2,539 households. The following is a list of the subdistrict's mubans, which roughly correspond to the villages.

Village		Group (Mu)	Household	Population
Romanized name	Thai name	Group (Mu)	Household	Population
Kaeng	แก้ง	1	265	941
Kaeng	แก้ง	2	289	998
Pra Hoot	ประหูต	3	360	1,097
Yang	ยาง	4	252	803
Bung Khla	บุ่งคล้า	5	185	591
Huay Samran	ห้วยสำราญ	6	227	710
Hai Tak	ไฮตาก	7	227	723
Thaew Sa-at	แถวสะอาด	8	206	584
Sri Thai Yang	ศรีไทยยาง	9	197	606
Na Kham Yai	นาคำใหญ่	10	166	577
Kaeng Charoen	แก้งเจริญ	11	165	682
Total			2,539	8,312
