= Na Hom, Thung Si Udom =

Coordinates: 14.751144°N 104.859354°E

Na Hom นาห่อม
- Subdistrict
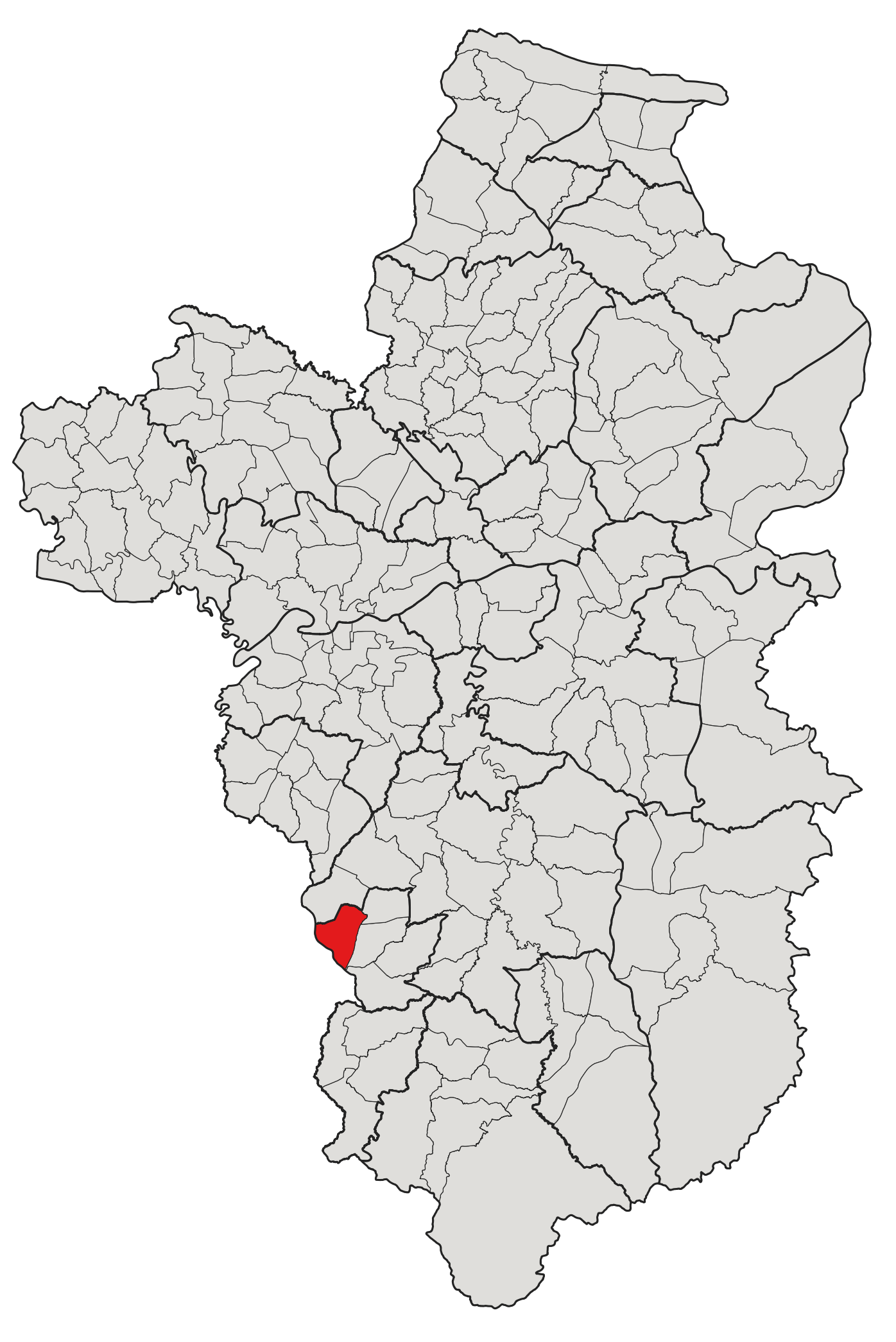
- Subdistrict location in Ubon Ratchathani province
- Country: Thailand
- Province: Ubon Ratchathani
- District: Thung Si Udom
- Number of Muban: 8
- Number of Mu: 11
- Subdistrict established: 1993

Area
  - Total: 45 km^{2} (17 sq mi)

Population (2021)
  - Total: 4,640
  - Density: 103.11/km^{2} (267.1/sq mi)
- Time zone: UTC+7 (ICT)
- Postal code: 34160

Na Hom (Thai: นาห่อม) is a tambon (subdistrict) located in the westernmost area of Thung Si Udom district, in Ubon Ratchathani Province, Thailand. In 2021, it had a population of 4,640 people. Neighbouring subdistricts are (clockwise from the south) Tha Khlo, Thung Thoeng, Nong Om, and Khok Chamrae.

== History ==
Following the 1992 separation of five districts from Det Udom: Thung Thoeng, Nong Om, Na Kasem, Khok Chamrae, and Kut Ruea to form a minor district (king amphoe) called "Thung Si Udom," some communities in tambon Thung Thoeng preferred to remain affiliated with the original district, so the central government decided to split the tambon into two portions, the upper portion of which is now Thung Thoeng and was transferred back to Det Udom in the following year, while the lower region, which consisted of nine villages, was formed a new subdistrict called "Na Hom," and has been governed by Thung Si Udom since then.

After its establishment, the tambon was governed by the Subdistrict Council of Na Hom, until May 25, 1997, when the council was upgraded by the Department of Provincial Administration to be the Subdistrict Administrative Organization of Na Hom.

== Geography ==
The tambon is located in the western region of the Thung Si Udom district, on the undulating land between the low river plains of the Lam Dom Yai River (ลำโดมใหญ่) in the east and of the Huai Khayung Creek (ห้วยขะยุง) in the west.

== Administration ==
The subdistrict of Na Hom is divided into eight administrative villages (mubans; หมู่บ้าน), one of which, Na Hom village, was further divided into three community groups (Mu; หมู่). The entire area is governed by the Subdistrict Administrative Organization of Na Hom (องค์การบริหารส่วนตำบลนาห่อม; Na Hom SAO).

As of the 2021 census, it had a population of 4,640 people with 1,451 households. The following is a list of the subdistrict's mubans, which roughly correspond to the villages.

Village		Group (Mu)	Household	Population
Romanized name	Thai name	Group (Mu)	Household	Population
Na Hom	นาห่อม	1	163	474
Na Hom	นาห่อม	10	82	313
Na Hom	นาห่อม	11	170	651
Non Chan	โนนจาน	2	156	419
Nong Nam Khun	หนองน้ำขุ่น	4	180	596
Wang Muang	วังม่วง	5	95	326
Kham Nok Plao	คำนกเปล้า	6	122	389
Nong Bua Aree	หนองบัวอารีย์	7	182	492
Tha To	ตาโท	8	130	428
Nong Chik	หนองจิก	9	100	308
Central House Registration			0	0
Total			1,451	4,640

== Chief Executive ==
The following is a list of the Chief Executives of the Subdistrict Administrative Organization of Na Hom since its establishment in 1997.

Chief Executive		Term of Office	Note
Romanized name	Thai name	Term of Office	Note
Sern Ka-mueang	เสริม กาเมือง	February–March 1998 (1 month)	Designated
Duangchan Bunlo	ดวงจันทร์ บุญหล่อ	March–November 1998 (8 months)	Indirect election
Singkai Pilarat	สิงไค พิลารัตน์	November 1998–January 1999 (2 months)	Indirect election
Thanom Kaewphraprap	ถนอม แก้วพระปราบ	January 1999–April 1999 (3 months)	Indirect election
Chalerm Sirinai	เฉลิม ศิรินัย	April 1999–June 2001 (2 years and 2 months)	Indirect election
Thanom Worthong	ถนอม วอทอง	June 2001–June 2005 (4 years)	Indirect election
Sutee Karuna	สุธี กรุณา	July 2005–July 2009 (4 years)	Direct election
Noppalak Supalak	นพลักษณ์ ศุภลักษณ์	September 2009–September 2013 (4 years)	Direct election
Narin Boonkhachon	นรินทร์ บุญขจร	October 2013–October 2017 (4 years)	Direct election
Narin Boonkhachon	นรินทร์ บุญขจร	October 2017–October 2021 (4 years)	Appointed by the National Council for Peace and Order
Narin Boonkhachon	นรินทร์ บุญขจร	October 2021–Present (4 years and 11 months)	Direct election
