= Thung Thoeng =

Coordinates: 14.819833°N 104.863956°E

Thung Thoeng ทุ่งเทิง
- Subdistrict
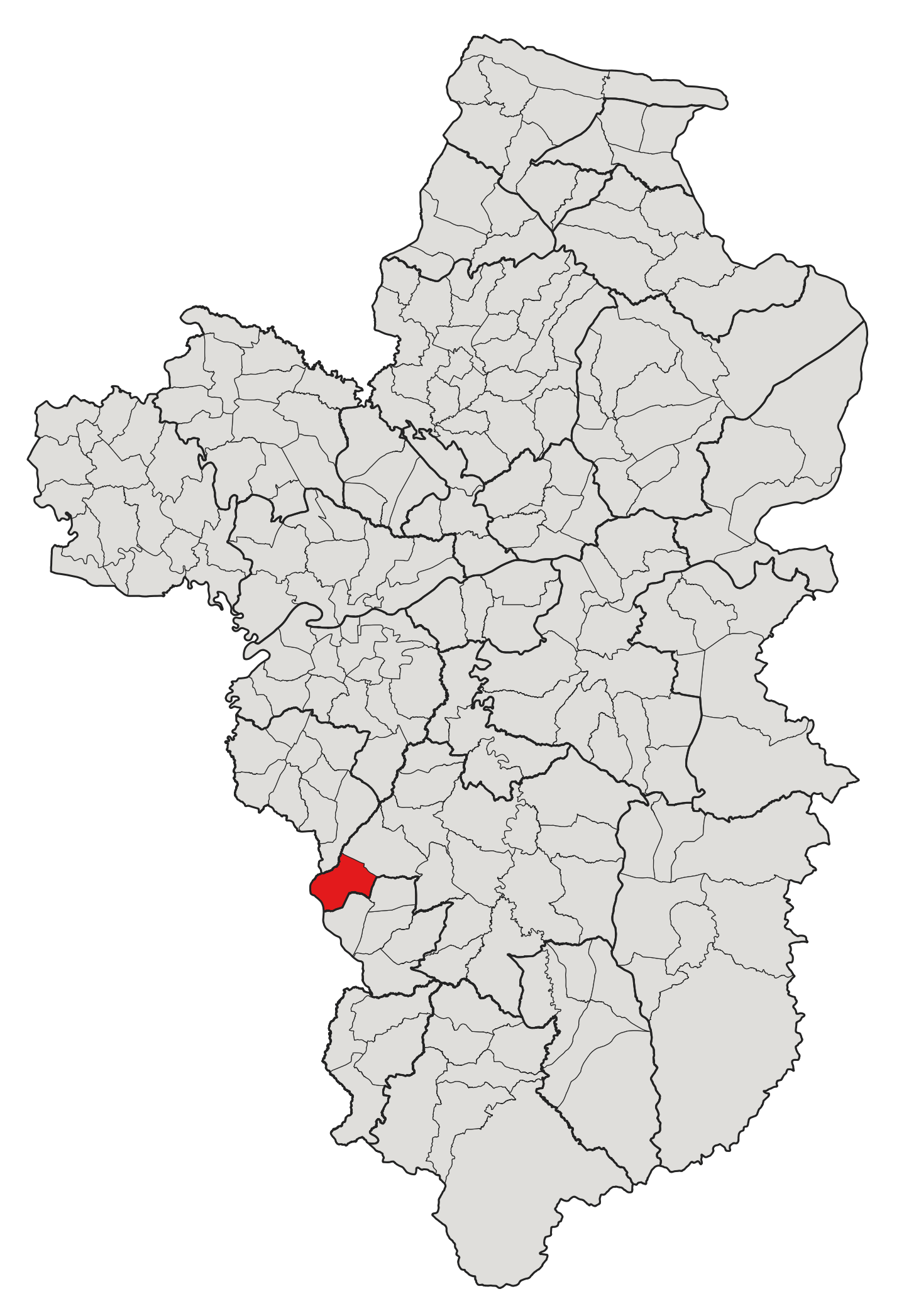
- Subdistrict location in Ubon Ratchathani province
- Country: Thailand
- Province: Ubon Ratchathani
- District: Det Udom
- Mubans: 14
- Number of Mu: 15
- Subdistrict established: 1961

Population (2021)
  - Total: 8,296
- Time zone: UTC+7 (ICT)
- Postal code: 34160

Thung Thoeng (Thai: ทุ่งเทิง) is a tambon (subdistrict) located in the westernmost region of Det Udom District, in Ubon Ratchathani Province, Thailand. In 2021, it had a population of 8,296 people. Neighbouring subdistricts are (clockwise from the south) Na Hom, Tha Khlo, Nong Kung, Khok Sawang, Na Krasaeng, and Nong Om.

== History ==
Previously, the area was governed by Som Sa-at and Kaeng subdistricts. Later in 1961, Thung Thoeng legally gained subdistrict status by absorbing seven and six villages from Som Sa-at and Kaeng, respectively, to form a new administrative division.

In 1966, together with the area divided from Na Suang and Som Sa-at, the northeastern region of Thung Thoeng was split to form a new subdistrict, Na Charoen.

In 1969, the southeastern was additionally split off to create a new administrative division, Nong Om subdistrict, which was also divided into two in 1991 to create a new tambon, Khok Chamrae. Both newly established subdistricts are currently gorverned by Thung Si Udom.

In 1992, Thung Thoeng subdistrict, along with Nong Om, Na Kasem, Kut Ruea, and Khok Chamrae, was separated from Det Udom, to form a new district, Thung Si Udom. But Thung Thoeng was later transferred back to the Det Udon district a year later. However, before the transfer, nine of its affiliated villages in the southern part were split off to create a new subdistrict, Na Hom, which is currently a tambon of Thung Si Udom district.

== Administration ==
The tambon is divided into 14 administrative villages (mubans; หมู่บ้าน), one of which, Bua Charoen village, was further divided into two community groups (Mu; หมู่). The entire area is governed by the Subdistrict Administrative Organization of Thung Thoeng (องค์การบริหารส่วนตำบลทุ่งเทิง; Thung Thoeng SAO).

The following is a list of the subdistrict's mubans, which roughly correspond to the villages, as of the 2021 census.

Village		Group (Mu)	Household	Population
Romanized name	Thai name	Group (Mu)	Household	Population
Thung Thoeng	ทุ่งเทิง	1	395	972
Non	โนน	2	285	672
Nong Yaow	หนองยาว	3	311	862
Non Sawang	โนนสว่าง	4	246	548
Nong Pho Hai	หนองโพธิ์ไฮ	5	204	528
Nong Bon	หนองบอน	6	146	356
Srang Pok	สร้างพอก	7	83	157
Non Chan	โนนจันทร์	8	88	309
Bua Charoen	บัวเจริญ	9	256	657
Bua Charoen	บัวเจริญ	15	186	536
Non Thong	โนนทอง	10	215	604
Nong Kheehen Yai	หนองขี้เห็นใหญ่	11	391	796
Thung Charoen	ทุ่งเจริญ	12	229	534
Thung Swang	ทุ่งสว่าง	13	119	377
Pho Thong	โพธิ์ทอง	14	137	388
Grand total			3,291	8,296
