= Som Sa-at =

Coordinates: 14.827676°N 104.982862°E

Som Sa-at สมสะอาด
- Subdistrict
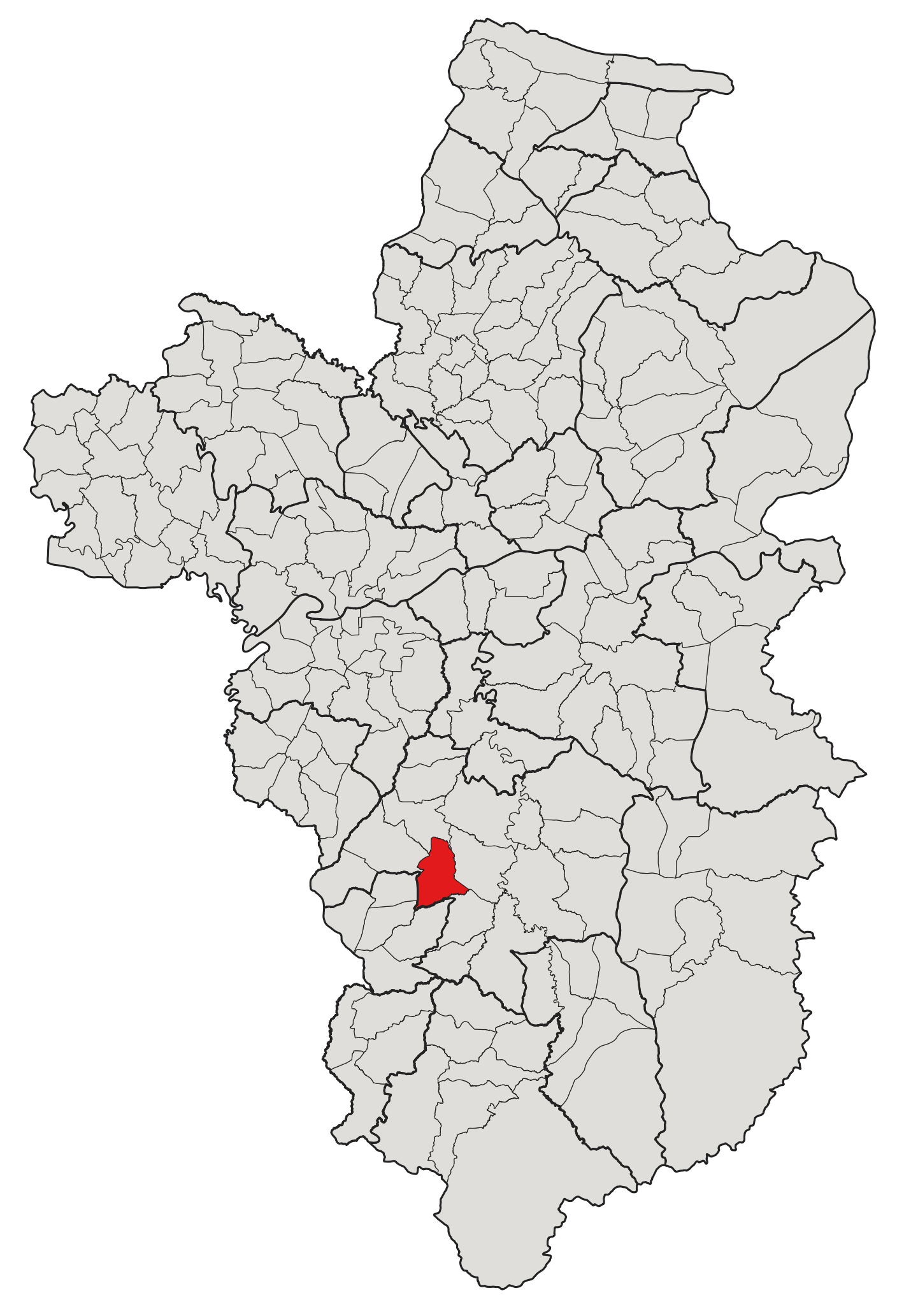
- Subdistrict location in Ubon Ratchathani province
- Country: Thailand
- Province: Ubon Ratchathani
- District: Det Udom
- Mubans: 12
- Number of Mu: 13
- Subdistrict established: 1892

Area
  - Total: 56 km^{2} (22 sq mi)

Population (2021)
  - Total: 10,882
  - Density: 194.32/km^{2} (503.3/sq mi)
- Time zone: UTC+7 (ICT)
- Postal code: 34160

Som Sa-at (Thai: สมสะอาด) is a tambon (subdistrict) located in the mid-west region of Det Udom District, in Ubon Ratchathani Province, Thailand. In 2021, it had a population of 10,882 people. Neighbouring subdistricts are (clockwise from the south) Non Sombun, Na Kasem, Nong Om, Na Krasaeng, Na Charoen, and Tha Pho Si.

== History ==
Before 1997, Som Sa-ad tambon was governed by its subdistrict council, but such a local government has been promoted to the Subdistrict Administrative Organization of Som Sa-at (องค์การบริหารส่วนตำบลสมสะอาด; Som Sa-at SAO) in February 1997, the first subdistrict member court election happened in May that year.

In 1961, together with the area divided from Kaeng, its western area which consisted of seven villages was split off to form a new subdistrict, Thung Thoeng.

In 1966, together with the area divided from Na Suang and Thung Thoeng, the northern region of the tambon was split to form a new subdistrict, Na Charoen.

== Geography ==
The tambon is located in the mid-west region of the Det Udom district, on the river plain of the Lam Dom Yai River.

== Administration ==
Som Sa-at subdistrict is divided into 12 administrative villages (mubans; หมู่บ้าน), one of which, Muang village, was further divided into two community groups (Mu; หมู่). The entire area is governed by the Subdistrict Administrative Organization of Som Sa-at (องค์การบริหารส่วนตำบลสมสะอาด; Som Sa-at SAO).

The following is a list of the subdistrict's mubans, which roughly correspond to the villages, as of the 2021 census.

Village		Group (Mu)	Household	Population
Romanized name	Thai name	Group (Mu)	Household	Population
Som Sa-at	สมสะอาด	1	354	1,197
Ta Luang	ท่าหลวง	2	251	885
Muang	ม่วง	3	338	957
Muang	ม่วง	10	434	1,259
Na Di	นาดี	4	293	747
Na Kham	นาคำ	5	388	959
Non Sanam	โนนสนาม	6	375	886
Suan Phai	สวนฝ้าย	7	250	821
Nong Bua Luang	หนองบัวหลวง	8	211	685
Huai Aree	ห้วยอารีย์	9	230	841
Rat Samran	ราษฎร์สำราญ	11	119	361
Mai Charoen	ใหม่เจริญ	12	196	663
Muang Samakki	ม่วงสามัคคี	13	176	621
Total			3,615	10,882
