= Khok Chamrae =

Coordinates: 14.732743°N 04.908036°E

Khok Chamrae โคกชำแระ
- Subdistrict
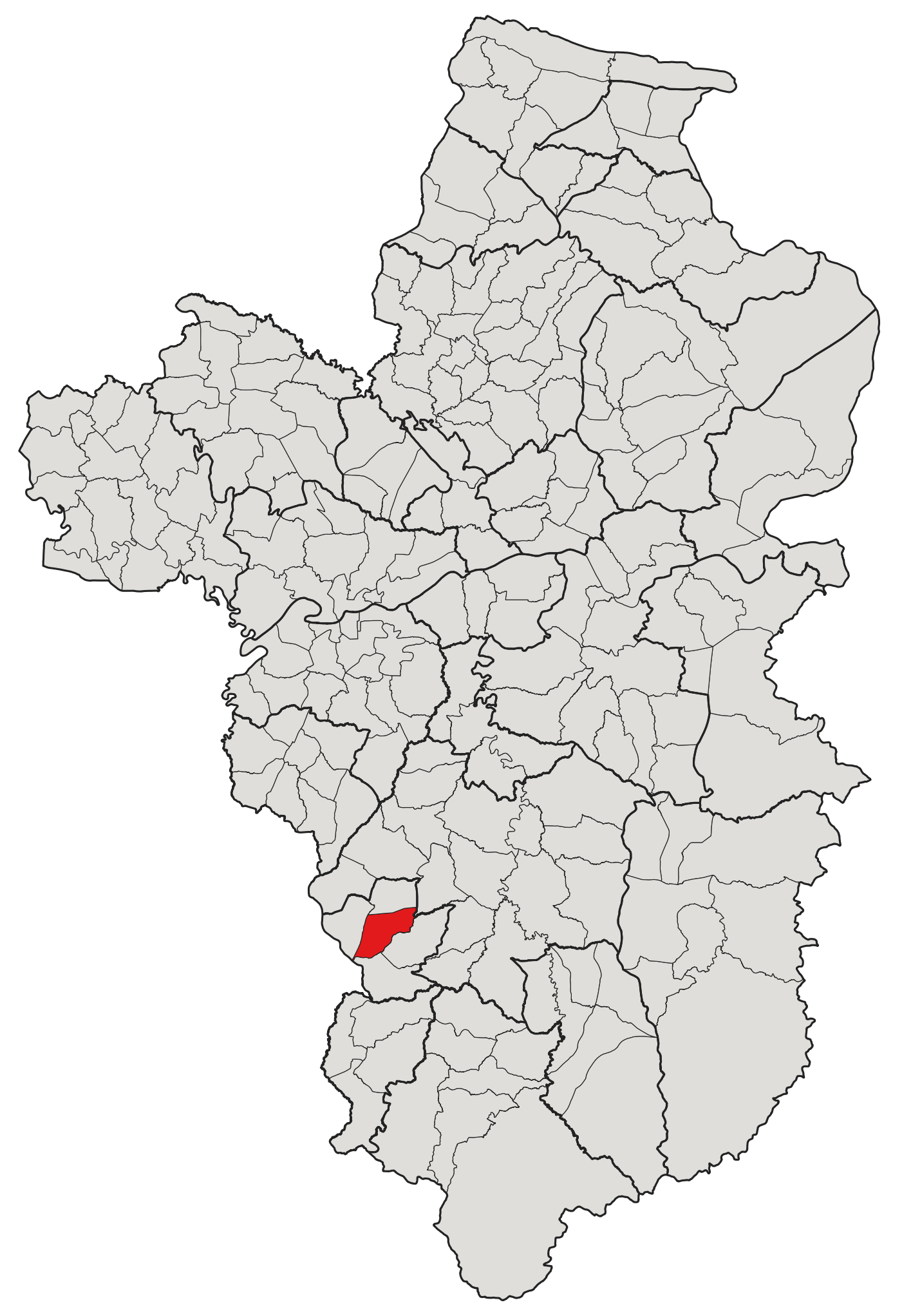
- Subdistrict location in Ubon Ratchathani province
- Country: Thailand
- Province: Ubon Ratchathani
- District: Thung Si Udom
- Number of Muban: 9
- Number of Mu: 10
- Subdistrict established: 1991

Area
  - Total: 46 km^{2} (18 sq mi)

Population (2021)
  - Total: 6,056
  - Density: 131.65/km^{2} (341.0/sq mi)
- Time zone: UTC+7 (ICT)
- Postal code: 34160

Khok Chamrae (Thai: โคกชำแระ) is a tambon (subdistrict) located in the central region of Thung Si Udom district, in Ubon Ratchathani Province, Thailand. In 2021, it had a population of 6,056 people. Neighbouring subdistricts are (clockwise from the south) Na Kasem, Kut Ruea, Kut Salao, Na Hom, Nong Om, and Som Sa-at.

== History ==
The tambon was founded in 1991 by incorporating eight settlements in the southern part of Nong Om in the Det Udom district. A year later, both Khok Chamrae and its parent tambon, together with three other subdistricts, including Thung Thoeng, Na Kasem, and Kut Ruea, were split off from Det Udom district to create a minor district (king amphoe) called Thung Si Udom. However, the inclusion of tambon Thung Thoeng into the new district was undone a year later, on June 1.

After its establishment, the tambon was governed by the Subdistrict Council of Khok Chamrae, until March 3, 1997, when the council was upgraded by the Department of Provincial Administration to be the Subdistrict Administrative Organization of Khok Chamrae.

== Geography ==
The tambon is located in the central region of the Thung Si Udom district, on the river plains of the Chamrae Creek (ห้วยชำแระ), one of the tributaries of the Lam Dom Yai River (ลำโดมใหญ่).

== Administration ==
The subdistrict of Khok Chamrae is divided into nine administrative villages (mubans; หมู่บ้าน), one of which, Khok Chamrae village, was further divided into two community groups (Mu; หมู่). The entire area is governed by the Subdistrict Administrative Organization of Khok Chamrae (องค์การบริหารส่วนตำบลโคกชำแระ; Khok Chamrae SAO).

As of the 2021 census, it had a population of 6,056 people with 2,059 households. The following is a list of the subdistrict's mubans, which roughly correspond to the villages.

Village		Group (Mu)	Household	Population
Romanized name	Thai name	Group (Mu)	Household	Population
Nong Khok	หนองคก	1	342	681
Non Swang	โนนสวาง	2	126	436
Khok Chamrae	โคกชำแระ	3	270	823
Khok Chamrae	โคกชำแระ	9	217	549
Nong Sano	หนองสะโน	4	123	466
Kham Klang	คำกลาง	5	116	472
Palan	พะลาน	6	143	368
Non Du	โนนดู่	7	226	704
Nong Sa-nom	หนองสนม	8	297	1,113
Si Udom	ศรีอุดม	10	198	427
Central house Registration			1	17
Total			2,059	6,056
