= Top Hu =

Coordinates: 14.711187°N 105.077696°E

Top Hu ตบหู
- Subdistrict
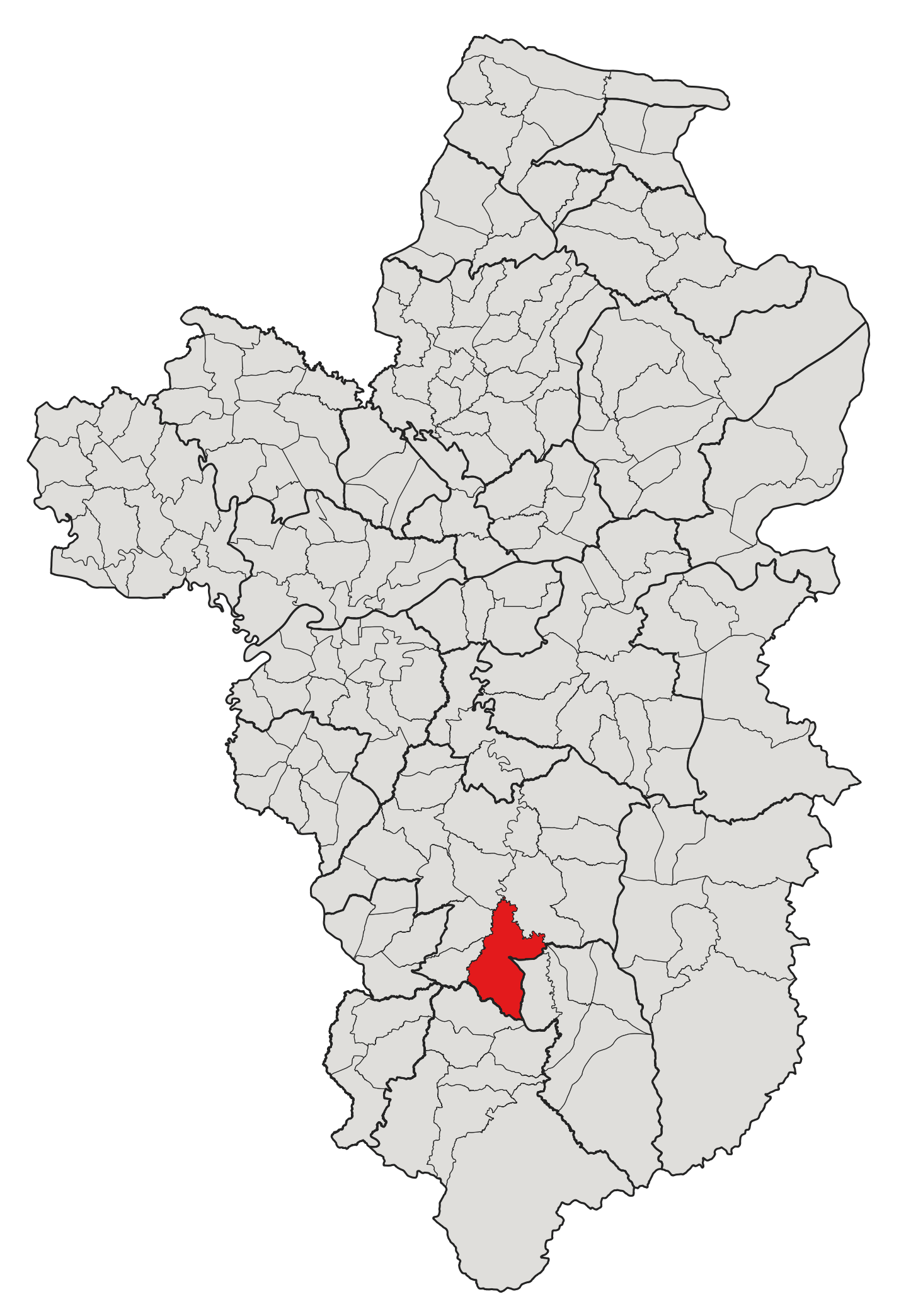
- Subdistrict location in Ubon Ratchathani province
- Country: Thailand
- Province: Ubon Ratchathani
- District: Det Udom
- Mubans: 17
- Number of Mu: 22
- Subdistrict established: 1976

Area
  - Total: 110.60 km^{2} (42.70 sq mi)

Population (2021)
  - Total: 12,340
  - Density: 111.57/km^{2} (289.0/sq mi)
- Time zone: UTC+7 (ICT)
- Postal code: 34160

Top Hu (Thai: ตบหู) is a tambon (subdistrict) located in the southern region of Det Udom District, in Ubon Ratchathani Province, Thailand. In 2021, it had a population of 12,340 people. Neighbouring subdistricts are (clockwise from the south) Yang, Kaeng, Non Sombun, Tha Pho Si, Klang, Phon Sawan, and Non Sawan.

== History ==
The tambon was named after the village in the area; however, such a village was later spilt off to create a new subdistrict, Phon Sawan, which is currently a tambon in Na Chaluai district and was further divided to establish a new administrative division, Non Sawan, where the Top Hu village is currently located. Previously, the tambon was administered by its subdistrict council (สภาตำบล), but the council was later upgraded to the Subdistrict Administrative Organization of Top Hu on February 23, 1997.

In 1972, together with six villages split from Na Chaluai, three of the villages in Top Hu were broke off to form a new subdistrict, Phon Sawan, which currently is a tambon in Na Chaluai district.

== Geography ==
The tambon is located in the southern region of the Det Udom district, on the low river plain of the Lam Dom Yai River.

== Administration ==
The Top Hu subdistrict is divided into 17 administrative villages (mubans; หมู่บ้าน), five of which, Kham Samran, Non Khaen, Pho Sai, Phon Duan, and Song Khon villages, each was further divided into two community groups (Mu; หมู่). The entire area is governed by the Subdistrict Administrative Organization of Top Hu (องค์การบริหารส่วนตำบลตบหู; Top Hu SAO).

As of the 2021 census, it had a population of 12,340 people with 5,467 households. The following is a list of the subdistrict's mubans, which roughly correspond to the villages.

Village		Group (Mu)	Household	Population
Romanized name	Thai name	Group (Mu)	Household	Population
Pho Sai	โพธิ์ไทร	1	179	566
Pho Sai	โพธิ์ไทร	16	217	570
Non Khaen	โนนแคน	2	214	534
Non Khaen	โนนแคน	19	259	842
Phon Duan	โพนดวน	3	305	647
Phon Duan	โพนดวน	22	307	659
Phan To	พันโต	4	232	237
Non Kaeng	โนนแก้ง	5	319	801
Non Karen	โนนกาเร็น	6	252	667
Pai	ไผ่	7	187	257
Kham Samran	คำสำราญ	8	187	405
Kham Samran	คำสำราญ	17	196	454
Sao Lao	เสาเล้า	9	378	638
Song Khon	สองคอน	10	228	518
Song Khon	สองคอน	18	182	411
Kham Taw	คำตาว	11	180	414
Non Saen Suk	โนนแสนสุข	12	204	397
Non Kasem	โนนเกษม	13	230	689
Thai Bunmee	ไทยบุญมี	14	255	668
Non Sanam	โนนสนาม	15	335	960
Non Charoen	โนนเจริญ	20	408	580
Non Sak Thong	โนนสักทอง	21	213	426
Total			5,467	12,340
