= Ban Khlo railway station =

Railway station in Thailand

Ban Khlo บ้านคล้อ
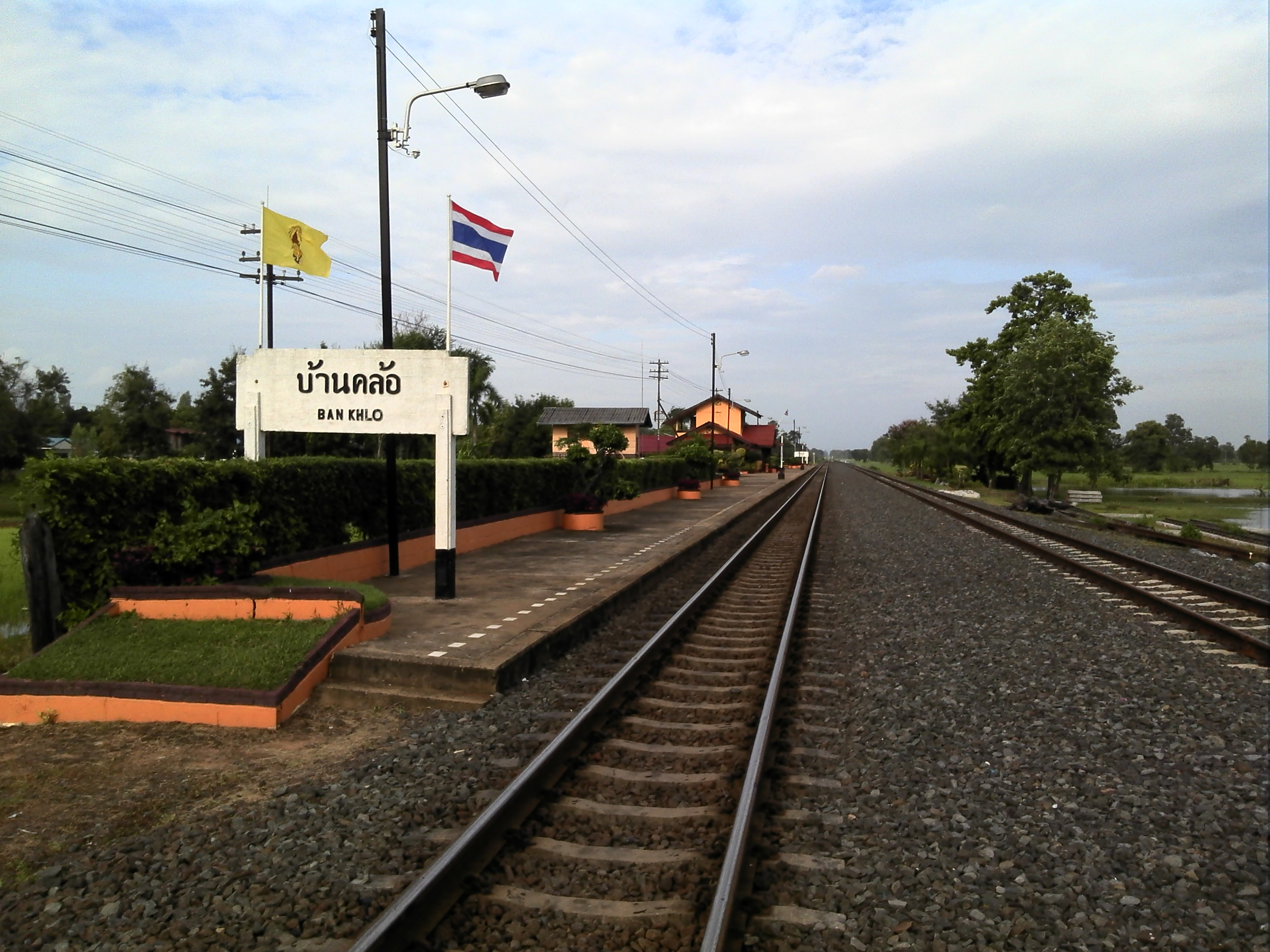

General information
- Location: Du Subdistrict, Kanthararom District, Sisaket Province
- Coordinates: 15°06′26″N 104°30′15″E
- Owner: State Railway of Thailand
- Line: Northeastern Line
- Platforms: 1
- Tracks: 2

Other information
- Station code: าค.

Services
Preceding station	State Railway of Thailand	Following station
Nong Waeng towards Hua Lamphong or Krung Thep Aphiwat	Northeastern Line	Kanthararom towards Ubon Ratchathani
Location

Ban Khlo station (Thai: สถานีบ้านคล้อ) is a railway station located in Du Subdistrict, Kanthararom District, Sisaket Province. It is a class 3 railway station located 534.20 km (331.9 mi) from Bangkok railway station.
