= Pa Mong =

Subdistrict of Det Udom District, in Ubon Ratchathani Province, Thailand

Coordinates: 14.977280°N 104.975629°E

Pa Mong ป่าโมง
- Subdistrict
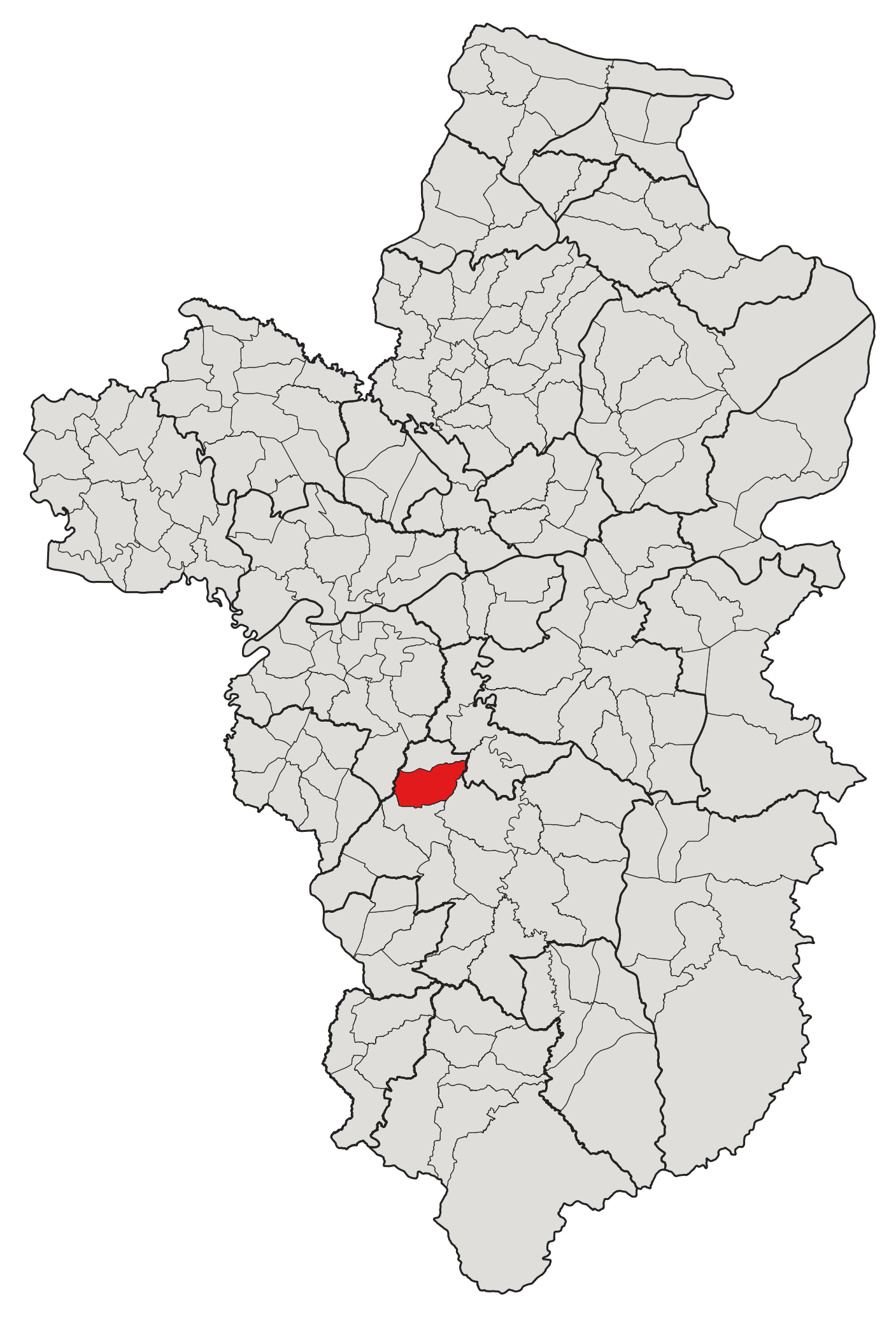
- Subdistrict location in Ubon Ratchathani province
- Country: Thailand
- Province: Ubon Ratchathani
- District: Det Udom
- Mubans: 9
- Number of Mu: 10
- Subdistrict established: 1988

Area
  - Total: 55 km^{2} (21 sq mi)

Population (2021)
  - Total: 4,940
  - Density: 89.82/km^{2} (232.6/sq mi)
- Time zone: UTC+7 (ICT)
- Postal code: 34160

Pa Mong (Thai: ป่าโมง) is a tambon (subdistrict) of Det Udom District, in Ubon Ratchathani Province, Thailand. In 2021, it had a population of 4,940 people. Neighbouring subdistricts are (clockwise from the south) Na Charoen, Sa Saming, Na Suang, Na Rueang, and Mueang Det.

== History ==
The area was administered from Na Suang and later became a subdistrict in its own right in 1988. Before 1997, the tambon was governed by the Subdistrict council of Pa Mong (สภาตำบลป่าโมง), which was later upgraded to the Subdistrict Administrative Organization of Pa Mong on February 23 that year.

== Geography ==
The tambon is located in the northwestern region of the Det Udom district, on a plateau with a tropical savanna climate.

== Administration ==
The tambon is divided into 9 administrative villages (mubans; หมู่บ้าน), one of which, Pa Mong Yai village, was further divided into two community groups (Mu; หมู่). The entire area is governed by the Subdistrict Administrative Organization of Pa Mong (องค์การบริหารส่วนตำบลป่าโมง; Pa Mong SAO).

The following is a list of the subdistrict's mubans, which roughly correspond to the villages, as of the 2021 census.

Village		Group (Mu)	Household	Population
Romanized name	Thai name	Group (Mu)	Household	Population
Pa Mong	ป่าโมง	1	218	534
Pa Mong Yai	ป่าโมงใหญ่	2	247	662
Pa Mong Yai	ป่าโมงใหญ่	10	138	400
Pa Mong Noi	ป่าโมงน้อย	3	336	693
Pa Wai	ป่าหวาย	4	371	688
Kham Klang	คำกลาง	5	227	781
Non Kho	โนนค้อ	6	67	216
Nong Yam Tao	หนองย่ำเต่า	7	135	421
Dom Phayom	ดอนพยอม	8	51	190
Nong Pha-aung	หนองผอุง	9	107	355
Total			1,897	4,940
