= Kanthararom railway station =

Railway station in Thailand

Kanthararom กันทรารมย์

General information
- Location: Dun Subdistrict, Kanthararom District, Sisaket Province
- Coordinates: 15°06′26″N 104°34′42″E
- Owner: State Railway of Thailand
- Line: Northeastern Line
- Platforms: 2
- Tracks: 2

Other information
- Station code: าร.

Services
Preceding station	State Railway of Thailand	Following station
Ban Khlo towards Hua Lamphong or Krung Thep Aphiwat	Northeastern Line	Ban Non Phueng Halt towards Ubon Ratchathani
Location

Kanthararom railway station is a railway station located in Dun Subdistrict, Kanthararom District, Sisaket Province. It is a class 2 railway station located 542.18 km (336.9 mi) from Bangkok railway station and is the main station for Kanthararom District.
