= Non Sombun, Det Udom =

Non Sombun โนนสมบูรณ์
- Subdistrict
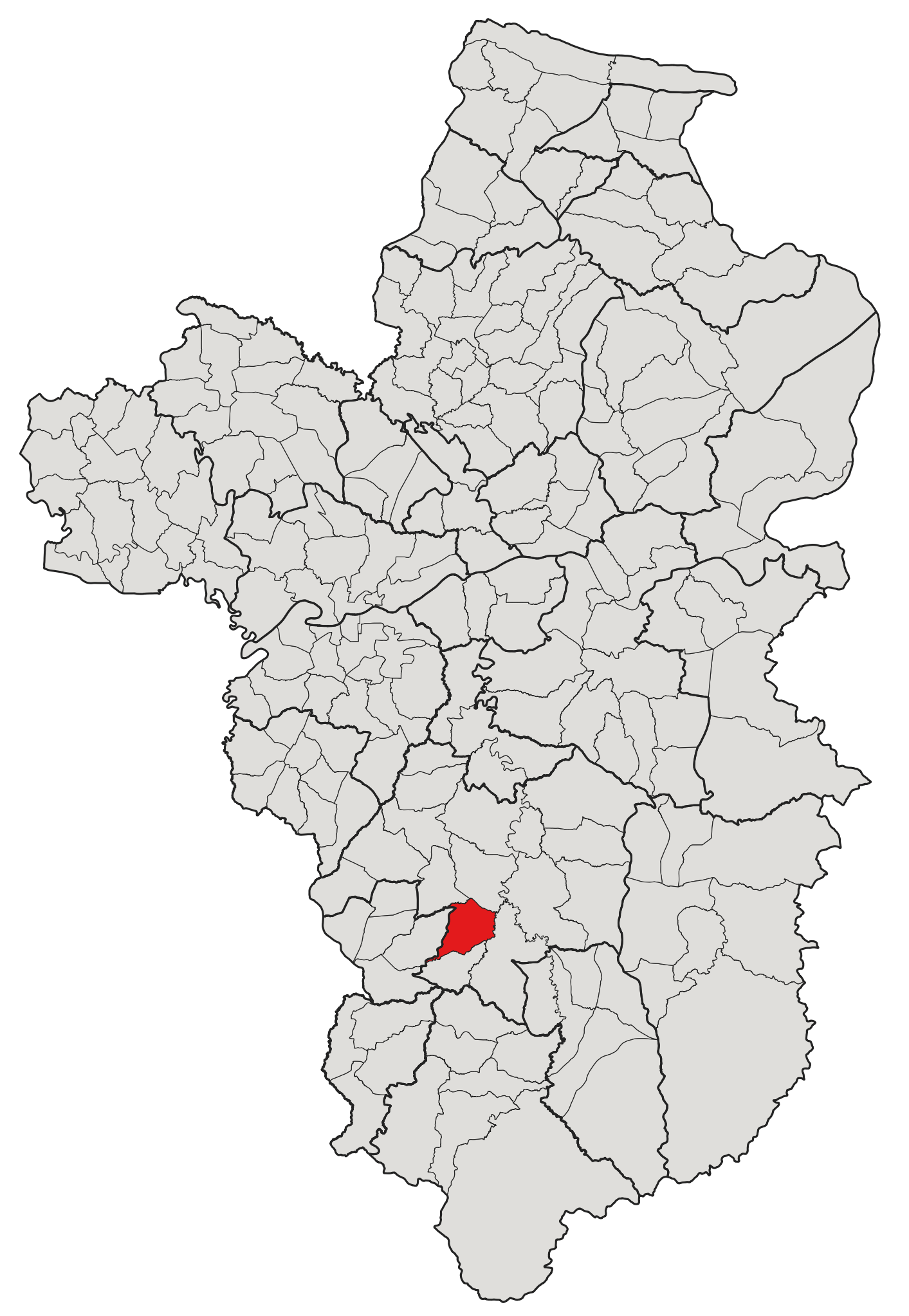
- Map of Det Udom district with Non Sombun highlighted in red

- Location in Thailand
- Country: Thailand
- Province: Ubon Ratchathani
- District: Det Udom
- Established: 1993
- Villages: 9

Area
  - Total: 54 km^{2} (21 sq mi)

Population (2021)
  - Total: 5,993
  - Density: 110/km^{2} (290/sq mi)
- Time zone: UTC+7 (ICT)
- Postal code: 34160
- Website: www.nonsombun.go.th

Non Sombun (Thai: โนนสมบูรณ์) is a tambon (subdistrict) located in the southern region of Det Udom district, in Ubon Ratchathani province, Thailand. In 2021, it had a population of 5,993 people. Neighbouring subdistricts are (clockwise from the south) Kaeng, Na Kasem, Som Sa-at, Tha Pho Si, and Top Hu.

== History ==
The subdistrict was formed in 1993 by splitting off nine villages from the northern region of Kaeng subdistrict. Following its establishment, it was governed by the Subdistrict Council of Non Sombun. On February 20, 1997, the council was upgraded by the Department of Provincial Administration to become the Subdistrict Administrative Organization of Non Sombun (SAO).

== Geography ==
The subdistrict is located in the southern region of Det Udom district. It sits on undulating land alongside the low river plain of the Lam Dom Yai River, and experiences a tropical savanna climate.

== Administration ==
The Non Sombun subdistrict is divided into nine administrative villages (mubans; หมู่บ้าน). The entire area is governed by the Subdistrict Administrative Organization of Non Sombun (องค์การบริหารส่วนตำบลโนนสมบูรณ์; Non Sombun SAO).

As of the 2021 census, the subdistrict had a population of 5,993 people residing in 2,066 households. The following is a list of the subdistrict's mubans, which roughly correspond to the villages:

Group (Mu)	Village (Romanized)	Village (Thai)	Households	Population
1	Na Udom	นาอุดม	285	964
2	Na Khae	นาแก	297	804
3	Mai Pattana	ใหม่พัฒนา	252	688
4	Than Wela Samakkhi	ทันเวลาสามัคคี	126	393
5	Non Sombun	โนนสมบูรณ์	399	906
6	Kha-nuan	ขนวน	140	482
7	Suan Sawan	สวนสวรรค์	203	529
8	Khok Khlang	กอกกลาง	97	389
9	Non Ngam	โนนงาม	267	838
Total			2,066	5,993
