= Nong Om =

Coordinates: 14.787718°N 104.928667°E

Nong Om หนองอ้ม
- Subdistrict
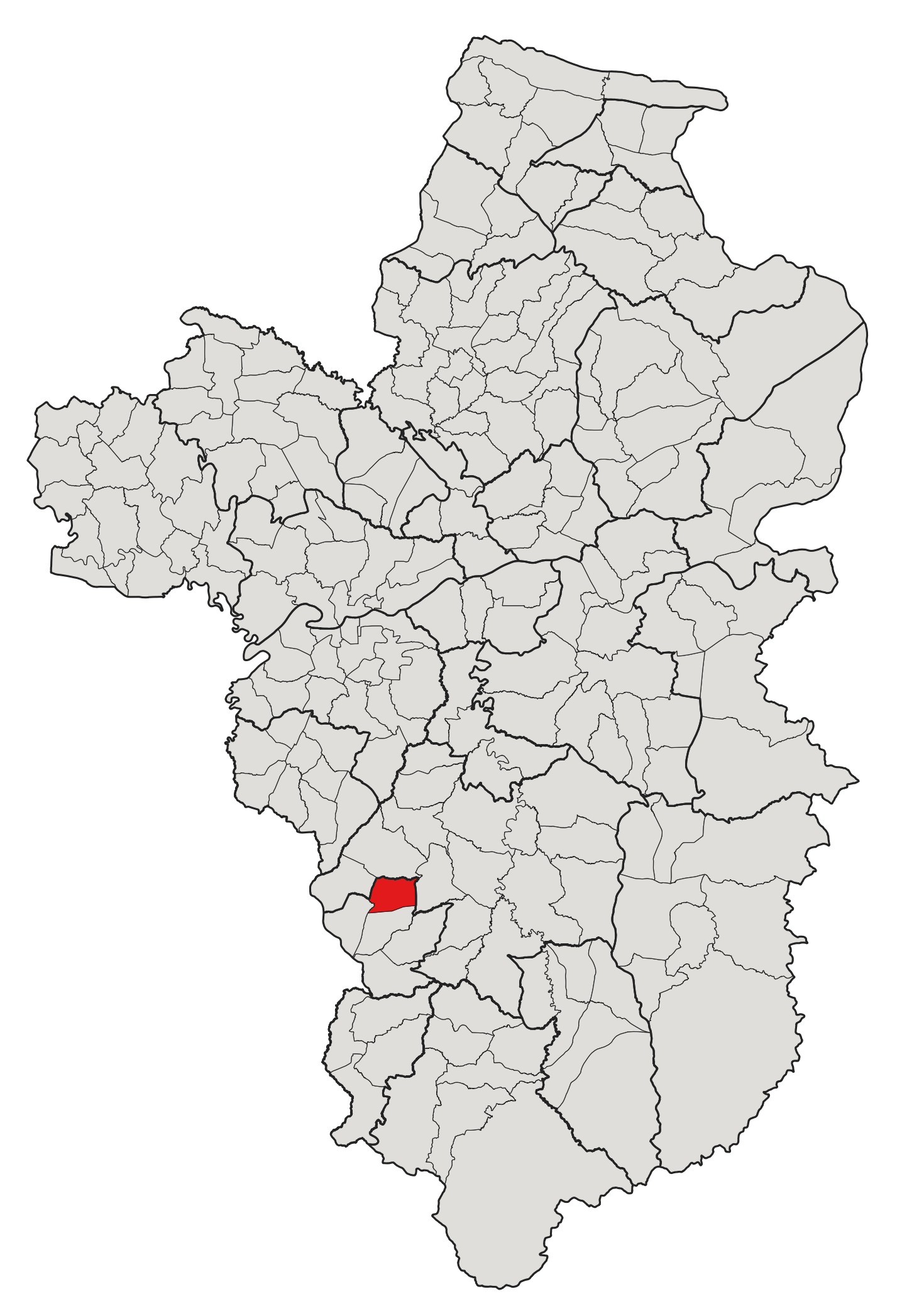
- Subdistrict location in Ubon Ratchathani province
- Country: Thailand
- Province: Ubon Ratchathani
- District: Thung Si Udom
- Mubans: 9
- Number of Mu: 10
- Subdistrict established: 1969

Area
  - Total: 35 km^{2} (14 sq mi)

Population (2021)
  - Total: 5,993
  - Density: 171.23/km^{2} (443.5/sq mi)
- Time zone: UTC+7 (ICT)
- Postal code: 34160

Nong Om (Thai: หนองอ้ม) is a tambon (subdistrict) located in the northernmost area of Thung Si Udom district, in Ubon Ratchathani Province, Thailand. In 2021, it had a population of 5,993 people. Neighbouring subdistricts are (clockwise from the south) Khok Chamrae, Na Hom, Thung Thoeng, Na Krasaeng, and Som Sa-at.

== History ==
The tambon Nong Om was formed in 1969, by splitting off 10 villages in the southeastern region of Thung Thoeng in Det Udom district. Later in 1991, the southwestern region of the tambon, which consisted of eight villages, was cut off to establish a new division, Khok Chamrae. A year after the demarcation, both Nong Om and Khok Chamrae, together with three other subdistricts, including Thung Thoeng, Na Kasem, and Kut Ruea, were split off from Det Udom district to create a minor district (king amphoe) called Thung Si Udom. However, the inclusion of tambon Thung Thoeng into the new district was undone a year later, on June 1, 1993.

== Geography ==
The tambon is located in the northern region of the Thung Si Udom district, on the undulating land between the low river plains of the Lam Dom Yai River (ลำโดมใหญ่) in the east and of the Huai Khayung Creek (ห้วยขะยุง) in the west.

== Administration ==
The Nong Om subdistrict is divided into nine administrative villages (mubans; หมู่บ้าน), one of which, Nong Om village, was further divided into two community groups (Mu; หมู่). The entire area is governed by the Subdistrict Administrative Organization of Nong Om (องค์การบริหารส่วนตำบลหนองอ้ม; Nong Om SAO).

As of the 2021 census, it had a population of 5,809 people with 1,903 households. The following is a list of the subdistrict's mubans, which roughly correspond to the villages.

Village		Group (Mu)	Household	Population
Romanized name	Thai name	Group (Mu)	Household	Population
Nong Om	หนองอ้ม	1	300	744
Nong Om	หนองอ้ม	3	223	626
Nong Khee Ten	หนองขี้เต็น	2	264	886
Ben	เบญจ์	4	263	921
Nong Si Kha	หนองสี่ขา	5	135	408
Non Rang	โนนรัง	6	150	513
Hong Por	ห่องปอ	7	165	575
Nong Bua Dong	หนองบัวดง	8	89	263
Thong Sawad	ทองสวัสดิ์	9	177	493
Nong Bua	หนองบัว	10	137	380
Total			1,903	5,809
