= Nong Waeng railway station =

Railway station in Thailand

Nong Waeng หนองแวง

General information
- Location: Phon Khwao Subdistrict, Mueang Sisaket District, Sisaket Province
- Coordinates: 15°06′26″N 104°26′21″E
- Owner: State Railway of Thailand
- Line: Northeastern Line
- Platforms: 1
- Tracks: 4

Other information
- Station code: อว.

Services
Preceding station	State Railway of Thailand	Following station
Chalerm Kanchana Halt towards Hua Lamphong or Krung Thep Aphiwat	Northeastern Line	Ban Khlo towards Ubon Ratchathani
Location

Nong Waeng railway station is a railway station located in Phon Khwao Subdistrict, Mueang Sisaket District, Sisaket Province. It is a class 3 railway station located 527.19 km (327.6 mi) from Bangkok railway station.
