= Na Charoen =

Coordinates: 14.918974486371035°N 104.97700993692897°E

Na Charoen นาเจริญ
- Subdistrict
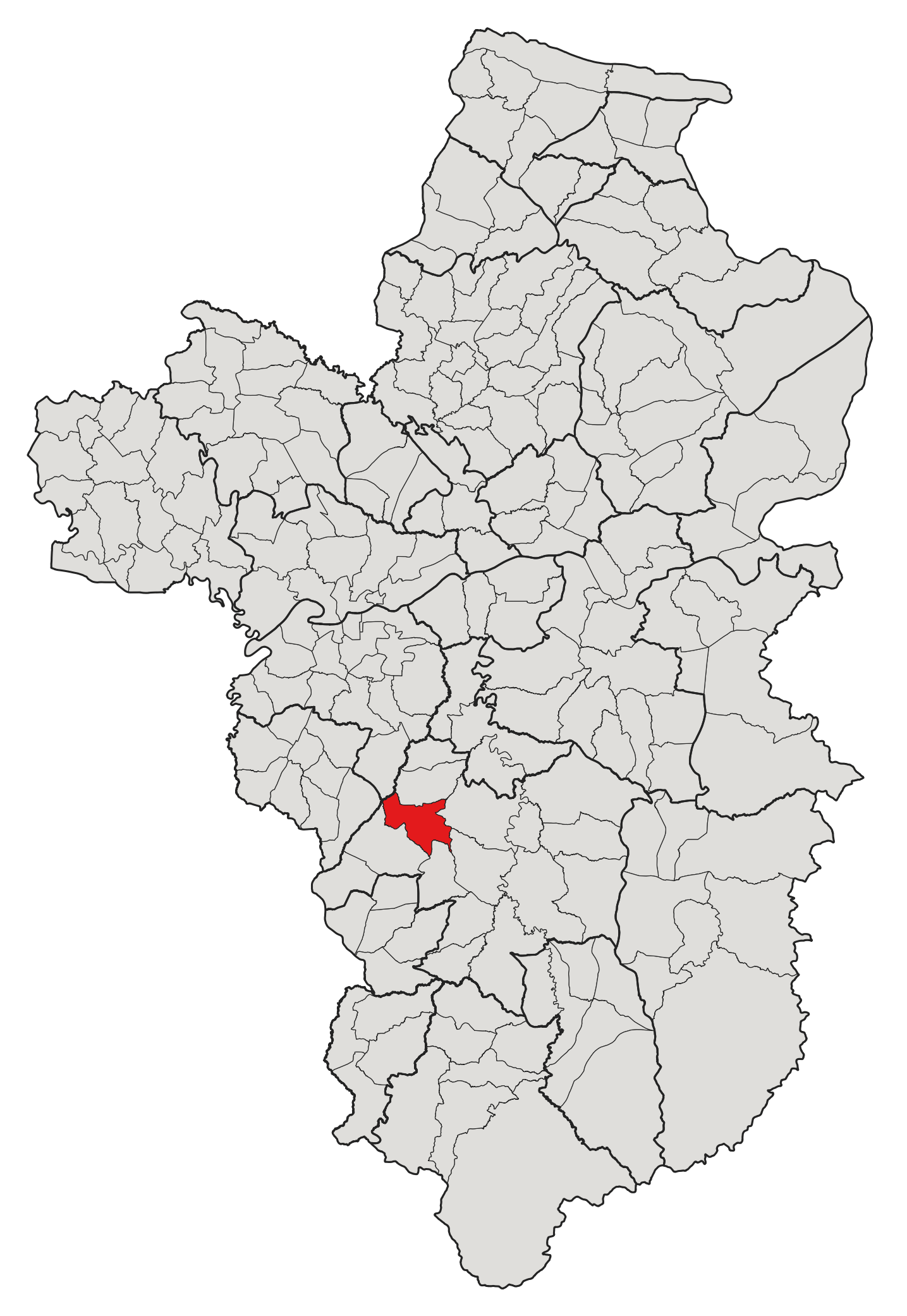
- Subdistrict location in Ubon Ratchathani province
- Country: Thailand
- Province: Ubon Ratchathani
- District: Det Udom
- Mubans: 10
- Number of Mu: 11
- Subdistrict established: 1966

Area
  - Total: 55 km^{2} (21 sq mi)

Population (2021)
  - Total: 7,560
  - Density: 137.45/km^{2} (356.0/sq mi)
- Time zone: UTC+7 (ICT)
- Postal code: 34160

Na Charoen (Thai: นาเจริญ) is a tambon (subdistrict) of Det Udom District, in Ubon Ratchathani Province, Thailand. In 2021, it had a population of 7,560 people. Neighbouring subdistricts are (clockwise from the south) Som Sa-at, Na Krasaeng, Sa Saming, Pa Mong, Mueang Det, and Tha Pho Si.

== History ==
Initially, the area was administered by three subdistricts including Na Suang, Som Sa-ad, and Thung Thoeng, but later became a subdistrict in its own right in 1966. Before 1997, the tambon was governed by the Subdistrict Council of Na Charoen (สภาตำบลนาเจริญ), which was later upgraded to the Subdistrict Administrative Organization of Na Charoen on February 23 that year.

In 1983, the western region of the tambon was splintered off to establish a new administrative division, the Na Krasaeng subdistrict.

== Geography ==
The tambon is located in the northwestern region of the Det Udom district, on a plateau with a tropical savanna climate.

== Administration ==
The tambon is divided into 10 administrative villages (mubans; หมู่บ้าน), one of which, Na Charoen village, was further divided into two community groups (Mu; หมู่). The entire area is governed by the Subdistrict Administrative Organization of Na Charoen (องค์การบริหารส่วนตำบลนาเจริญ; Na Charoen SAO).

The following is a list of the subdistrict's mubans, which roughly correspond to the villages, as of the 2021 census.

Village		Group (Mu)	Household	Population
Romanized name	Thai name	Group (Mu)	Household	Population
Na Charoen	นาเจริญ	1	547	1,483
Na Charoen	นาเจริญ	10	189	550
Nong Bua Daeng	หนองบัวแดง	2	293	589
Non Bak	โนนบาก	3	179	542
Hong Kham	ห่องคำ	4	340	898
Non Chik	โนนจิก	5	101	318
Hong Toei	ห่องเตย	6	247	533
Chok Chai	โชคชัย	7	242	619
Si Yaek Non Thong	สี่แยกโนนทอง	8	183	487
Si Nuan Pattana	ศรีนวลพัฒนา	9	192	382
Total			2,902	7,560
