= Nam Kliang district =

Nam Kliang น้ำเกลี้ยง
- District
- District location in Sisaket province
- Coordinates: 14°55′38″N 104°30′47″E
- Country: Thailand
- Province: Sisaket
- Seat: Nam Kliang

Area
  - Total: 257.8 km^{2} (99.5 sq mi)

Population (2008)
  - Total: 43,339
  - Density: 168.1/km^{2} (435/sq mi)
- Time zone: UTC+7 (ICT)
- Postal code: 33130
- Geocode: 3315

Nam Kliang (Thai: น้ำเกลี้ยง, pronounced [náːm klîa̯ŋ]) is a district (amphoe) in the central part of Sisaket province, northeastern Thailand.

== Geography ==
Neighboring districts are (from the north clockwise): Kanthararom, Non Khun, Benchalak, Si Rattana, Phayu, and Mueang Sisaket.

== History ==
The minor district (king amphoe) was created on 7 January 1986, when the four tambons, Nam Kliang, La-o, Tong Pit, and Khoen, were split off from Kanthararom district. It was upgraded to a full district on 4 July 1994.

== Administration ==
The district is divided into six sub-districts (tambons), which are further subdivided into 75 villages (mubans). There are no municipal (thesaban) areas. There are six tambon administrative organizations (TAO).

No.	Name	Thai	Villages	Pop.
1.	Nam Kliang	น้ำเกลี้ยง	10	5,869
2.	La-o	ละเอาะ	13	7,703
3.	Tong Pit	ตองปิด	14	7,254
4.	Khoen	เขิน	13	7,904
5.	Rung Rawi	รุ่งระวี	15	7,895
6.	Khup	คูบ	10	6,714
