= Non Khun district =

Non Khun โนนคูณ
- District
- District location in Sisaket province
- Coordinates: 14°55′42″N 104°41′24″E
- Country: Thailand
- Province: Sisaket
- Seat: Non Kho

Area
  - Total: 256.853 km^{2} (99.171 sq mi)

Population (2005)
  - Total: 37,865
  - Density: 218.5/km^{2} (566/sq mi)
- Time zone: UTC+7 (ICT)
- Postal code: 33250
- Geocode: 3313

Non Khun (Thai: โนนคูณ, pronounced [nōːn kʰūːn]) is a district (amphoe) in the eastern part of Sisaket province, northeastern Thailand.

== Geography ==
Neighboring districts are (from the south clockwise): Benchalak, Nam Kliang, and Kanthararom of Sisaket Province, and Samrong of Ubon Ratchathani province.

== History ==
Non Khun was created as a minor district (king amphoe) under Kanthararom district on 1 September 1977, with the tambons, Non Kho, Pho, Bok, and Nong Kung. It was upgraded to a full district on 1 January 1988.

== Administration ==
The district is divided into five sub-districts (tambons), which are further subdivided into 80 villages (mubans). There are no municipal (thesaban) areas. There are five tambon administrative organizations (TAO).

| No. | Name | Thai name | Villages | Pop. |
|---|---|---|---|---|
| 1. | Non Kho | โนนค้อ | 20 | 8,100 |
| 2. | Bok | บก | 17 | 9,589 |
| 3. | Pho | โพธิ์ | 13 | 5,605 |
| 4. | Nong Kung | หนองกุง | 18 | 9,606 |
| 5. | Lao Kwang | เหล่ากวาง | 12 | 4,965 |
