= Kut Ruea =

Coordinates: 14.671876°N 104.902475°E

Kut Ruea กุดเรือ
- Subdistrict
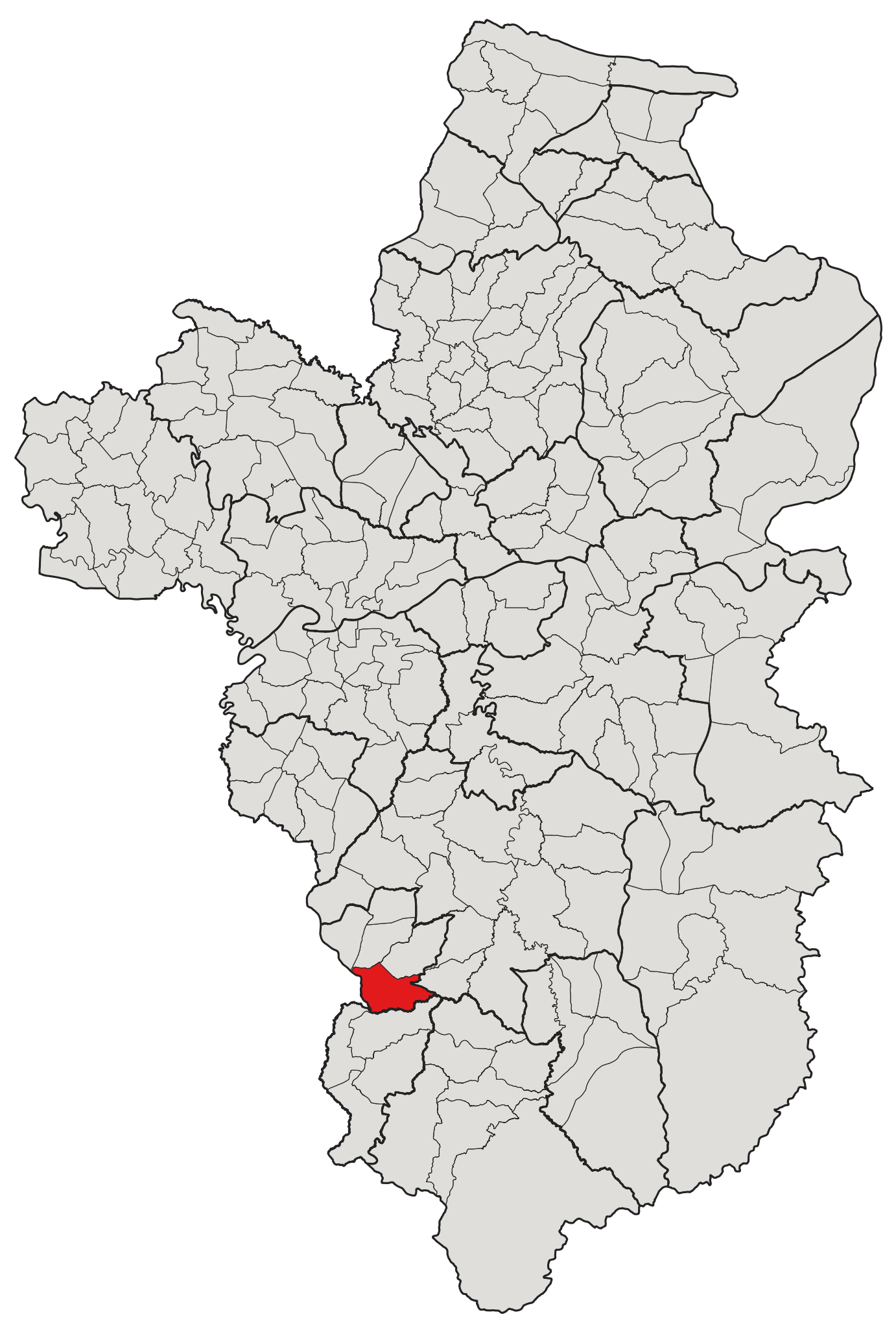
- Subdistrict location in Ubon Ratchathani province
- Country: Thailand
- Province: Ubon Ratchathani
- District: Thung Si Udom
- Mubans: 9
- Number of Mu: 10
- Subdistrict established: 1985

Area
  - Total: 56 km^{2} (22 sq mi)

Population (2021)
  - Total: 6,612
  - Density: 118.07/km^{2} (305.8/sq mi)
- Time zone: UTC+7 (ICT)
- Postal code: 34160

Kut Ruea (Thai: กุดเรือ) is a tambon (subdistrict) located in the southernmost area of Thung Si Udom district, in Ubon Ratchathani Province, Thailand. In 2021, it had a population of 6,612 people. Neighbouring subdistricts are (clockwise from the south) Khilek, Phaibun, Kut Salao, Khok Chamrae, Na Kasem, and Kaeng.

== History ==
The tambon was founded in 1985 by incorporating seven settlements in the western part of Kaeng in the Det Udom district. Later in 1992, tambon Kut Ruea, together with four other subdistricts, including Thung Thoeng, Na Kasem, Nong Om, and Khok Chamrae, were split off from Det Udom district to create a minor district (king amphoe) called Thung Si Udom. However, the inclusion of tambon Thung Thoeng into the new district was undone a year later, on June 1.

== Geography ==
The tambon is located in the southern region of the Thung Si Udom district, on the river plains of the Som Creek (ลำซอม), one of the tributaries of the Lam Dom Yai River (ลำโดมใหญ่).

== Administration ==
The Kut Ruea subdistrict is divided into nine administrative villages (mubans; หมู่บ้าน), one of which, Kut Ruea village, was further divided into two community groups (Mu; หมู่). The entire area is governed by the Subdistrict Administrative Organization of Kut Ruea (องค์การบริหารส่วนตำบลกุดเรือ; Kut Ruea SAO).

As of the 2021 census, it had a population of 6,612 people with 1,849 households. The following is a list of the subdistrict's mubans, which roughly correspond to the villages.

Village		Group (Mu)	Household	Population
Romanized name	Thai name	Group (Mu)	Household	Population
Kut Ruea	กุดเรือ	1	278	909
Kut Ruea	กุดเรือ	2	233	910
Nong Wa	หนองหว้า	3	96	338
Kut Pla Thong	กุดปลาตอง	4	154	538
Sum Ngu	ซำงู	5	244	1,206
Thung Chang	ทุ่งช้าง	6	191	727
Kut Kae	กุดแก	7	165	713
Kut Kai Kaew	กุดไก่แก้ว	8	134	447
Pan Thong	พานทอง	9	124	448
Thung Ket	ทุ่งเกตร	10	130	376
Total			1,849	6,612
