= Na Kasem =

Coordinates: 14.745157°N 104.948665°E

Na Kasem นาเกษม
- Subdistrict
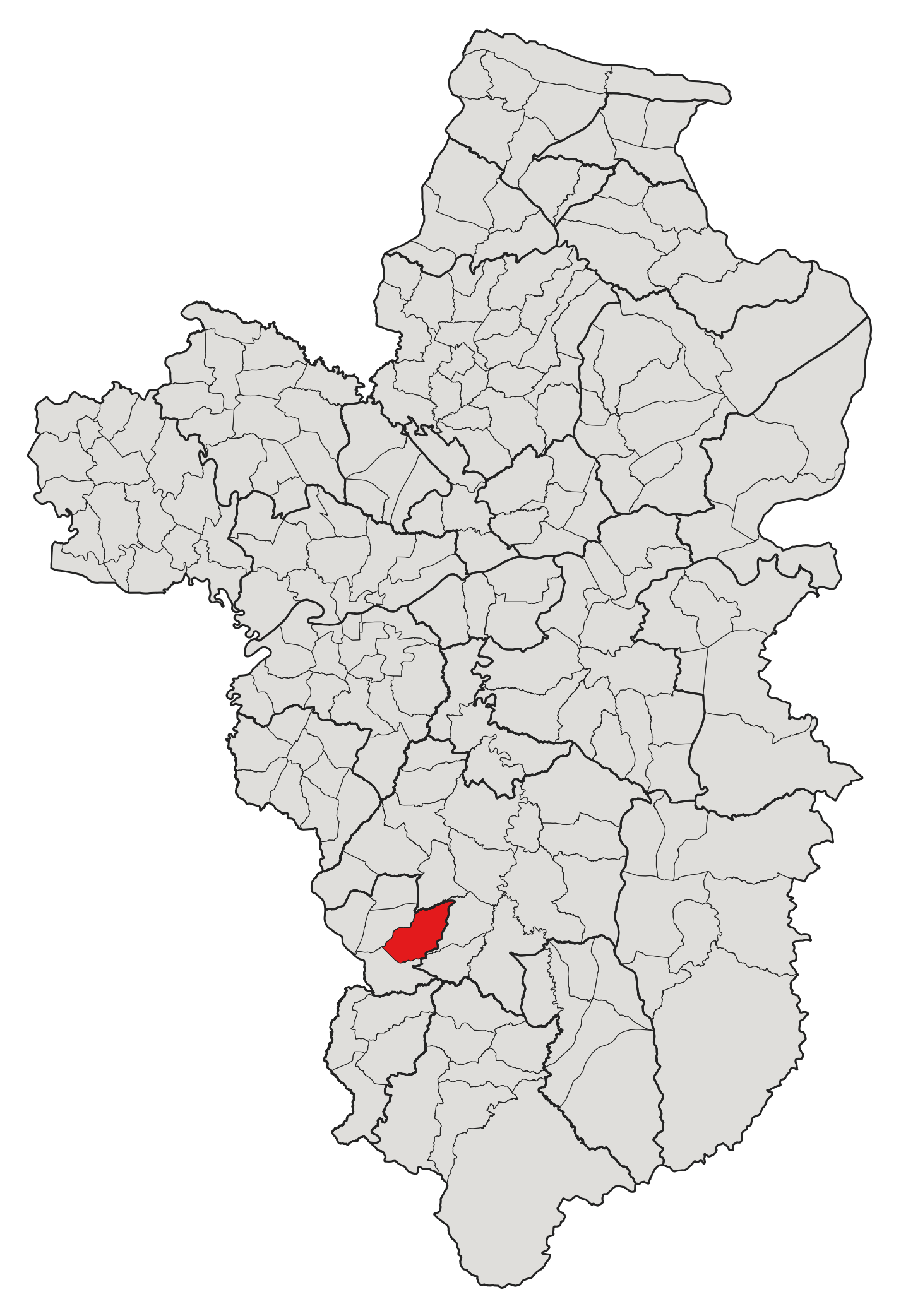
- Subdistrict location in Ubon Ratchathani province
- Country: Thailand
- Province: Ubon Ratchathani
- District: Thung Si Udom
- Mubans: 10
- Number of Mu: 11
- Subdistrict established: 1979

Area
  - Total: 61 km^{2} (24 sq mi)

Population (2021)
  - Total: 6,106
  - Density: 100.1/km^{2} (259/sq mi)
- Time zone: UTC+7 (ICT)
- Postal code: 34160

Na Kasem (Thai: นาเกษม) is a tambon (subdistrict) located in the easternmost area of Thung Si Udom district, in Ubon Ratchathani Province, Thailand. In 2021, it had a population of 6,106 people. Neighbouring subdistricts are (clockwise from the south) Kut Ruea, Khok Chamrae, Som Sa-at, Non Sombun, and Kaeng.

== History ==
The area was settled by a group of villagers evacuated from Sisaket province; the first settlement was named "Kan Tuan" (กันต๊วน) but was later renamed "Na Kasem" after obtaining subdistrict status in 1979.

The tambon was founded by incorporating seven settlements in the northern part of Kaeng in the Det Udom district. Later in 1992, tambon Na Kasem, together with four other subdistricts, including Thung Thoeng, Khok Chamrae, Nong Om, and Kut Ruea, were split off from Det Udom district to create a minor district (king amphoe) called Thung Si Udom. However, the inclusion of tambon Thung Thoeng into the new district was undone a year later, on June 1.

== Geography ==
The tambon is located in the northern region of the Thung Si Udom district, on the river plains of the Chamrae Creek (ห้วยชำแระ), one of the tributaries of the Lam Dom Yai River (ลำโดมใหญ่).

== Administration ==
The Na Kasem subdistrict is divided into 10 administrative villages (mubans; หมู่บ้าน), one of which, Na Kasem village, was further divided into two community groups (Mu; หมู่). The entire area is governed by the Subdistrict Administrative Organization of Na Kasem (องค์การบริหารส่วนตำบลนาเกษม; Na Kasem SAO).

As of the 2021 census, it had a population of 6,106 people with 1,918 households. The following is a list of the subdistrict's mubans, which roughly correspond to the villages.

Village		Group (Mu)	Household	Population
Romanized name	Thai name	Group (Mu)	Household	Population
Na Kasem	นาเกษม	1	286	1,003
Na Kasem	นาเกษม	9	169	680
Nong Thawon	หนองถาวร	2	180	453
Non Sanam	โนนสนาม	3	283	871
Na Charoen	นาเจริญ	4	172	594
Non Yai	โนนใหญ่	5	295	959
Non Sawang	โนนสว่าง	6	83	286
Noi Pattana	น้อยพัฒนา	7	105	315
Non Klang	โนนกลาง	8	72	208
Si Arun	ศรีอรุณ	10	94	294
Si Mueang	ศรีเมือง	11	179	444
Total			1,918	6,106
