= Na Krasaeng =

Coordinates: 14.87033143°N 104.94075511°E

Na Krasaeng นากระแซง
- Subdistrict
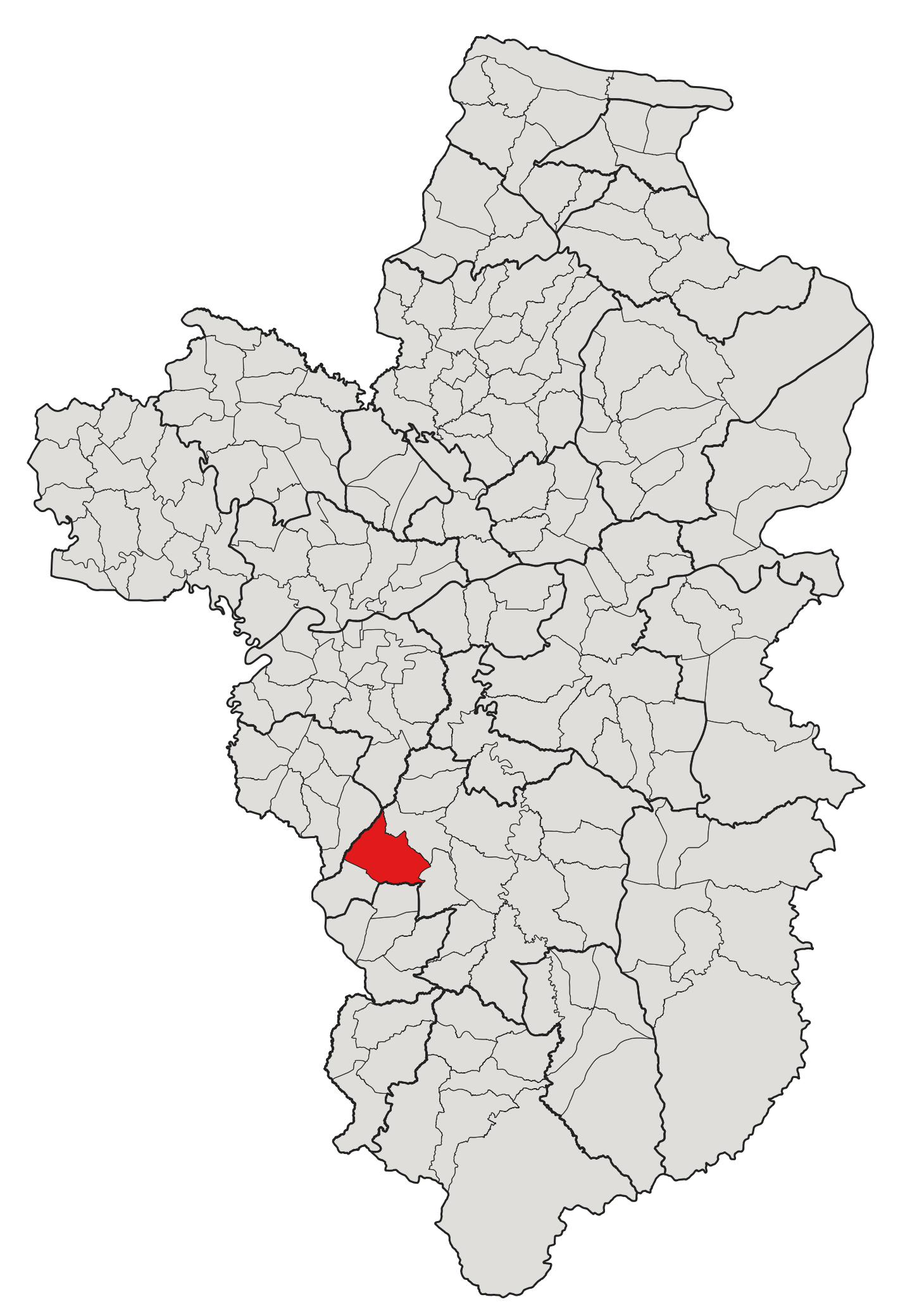
- Subdistrict location in Ubon Ratchathani province
- Country: Thailand
- Province: Ubon Ratchathani
- District: Det Udom
- Mubans: 13
- Number of Mu: 16
- Subdistrict established: 1983

Area
  - Total: 96.60 km^{2} (37.30 sq mi)

Population (2021)
  - Total: 13,602
  - Density: 140.81/km^{2} (364.7/sq mi)
- Time zone: UTC+7 (ICT)
- Postal code: 34160

Na Krasaeng (Thai: นากระแซง) is a tambon (subdistrict) of Det Udom District, in Ubon Ratchathani Province, Thailand. In 2021, it had a population of 13,602 people. Neighbouring subdistricts are (clockwise from the south) Nong Om, Thung Thoeng, Khok Sawang, Na Charoen, and Som Sa-at.

== History ==
The region was first settled in 1934 by five household villagers who evacuated from Khum village (บ้านคุ้ม) in Warin Chamrap district; a new village was unofficially called "Nong Khee Kwai" (หนองขี้ควาย; Cow dung pond's village), after the feature of the pond nearby. Later in 1945, the community size increased to 60–70 households, and the district government of Det Udom then renamed it "Na Krasaeng," after the runnel name formed in the area, as well as officially registering it as a new village under the control of Som Sa-at subdistrict. After that, the village was transferred to be a member of the Thung Thoeng subdistrict, then to Nong Om and Na Charoen, until it obtained subdistrict status in 1983.

== Geography ==
The tambon is located in the southwestern region of the Det Udom district, on a plateau with a tropical savanna climate.

== Administration ==
The tambon is divided into 13 administrative villages (mubans; หมู่บ้าน), one of which, Na Krasaeng village, was further divided into four community groups (Mu; หมู่). The entire area is governed by the Subdistrict Administrative Organization of Na Krasaeng (องค์การบริหารส่วนตำบลนากระแซง; Na Krasaeng SAO).

The following is a list of the subdistrict's mubans, which roughly correspond to the villages, as of the 2021 census.

Village		Group (Mu)	Household	Population
Romanized name	Thai name	Group (Mu)	Household	Population
Na Krasaeng	นากระแซง	1	327	879
Na Krasaeng	นากระแซง	2	323	888
Na Krasaeng	นากระแซง	13	280	843
Na Krasaeng	นากระแซง	16	138	455
Thai Wattana	ไทยวัฒนา	3	490	1,218
Non Sawang	โนนสว่าง	4	266	829
Nong Tae	หนองแต้	5	406	1,143
Mo Thong	หม้อทอง	6	381	1,017
Nong Ngern Hoy	หนองเงินฮ้อย	7	540	1,421
Toei	เตย	8	390	1093
Don Klang	ดอนกลาง	9	383	1,374
Nong Hai	หนองไฮ	10	292	934
Udom Pattana	อุดมพัฒนา	11	229	472
Kham Prasert	คำประเสริฐ	12	91	404
Rai Srisuk	ไร่ศรีสุข	14	169	448
Pa Teaw	ป่าติ้ว	15	98	284
Grand total			4,803	13,602
