= Na Yia district =

Na Yia นาเยีย
- District
- Districtlocation in Ubon Ratchathani province
- Coordinates: 15°3′34″N 105°3′37″E
- Country: Thailand
- Province: Ubon Ratchathani
- Seat: Na Yia

Area
  - Total: 227.0 km^{2} (87.6 sq mi)

Population (2005)
  - Total: 24,970
  - Density: 110/km^{2} (280/sq mi)
- Time zone: UTC+7 (ICT)
- Postal code: 34160
- Geocode: 3429

Na Yia (Thai: นาเยีย, pronounced [nāː jīa]; Northeastern Thai: นาเยีย, pronounced [na᷇ː ɲi᷇a]) is a district (amphoe) in the central part of Ubon Ratchathani province, northeastern Thailand.

== History ==
Na Yia was separated from Det Udom district to create a minor district (king amphoe) on 31 May 1993.

On 15 May 2007, all 81 minor districts were upgraded to full districts. On 24 August the upgrade became official.

== Geography ==
Neighboring districts are (from the north clockwise): Sawang Wirawong, Phibun Mangsahan, Det Udom and Warin Chamrap.

== Administration ==
The district is divided into three sub-districts (tambons), which are further subdivided into 34 villages (mubans). Na Yia is a township (thesaban tambon) which covers parts of tambon Na Yia. There are a further three tambon administrative organizations (TAO).

No.	Name	Thai name	Villages	Pop.
1.	Na Yia	นาเยีย	12	11,750
2.	Na Di	นาดี	13	6,898
3.	Na Rueang	นาเรือง	9	6,322
