= Na Chaluai district =

Na Chaluai นาจะหลวย
- District
- District location in Ubon Ratchathani province
- Coordinates: 14°31′17″N 105°14′46″E
- Country: Thailand
- Province: Ubon Ratchathani
- Seat: Na Chaluai

Area
  - Total: 632.0 km^{2} (244.0 sq mi)

Population (2005)
  - Total: 53,774
  - Density: 85.1/km^{2} (220/sq mi)
- Time zone: UTC+7 (ICT)
- Postal code: 34280
- Geocode: 3408

Na Chaluai (Thai: นาจะหลวย, pronounced [nāː tɕā.lǔaj]; Northeastern Thai: นาจะหลวย, pronounced [nâː tɕā.lǔaj]) is a district (amphoe) in the southern part of Ubon Ratchathani province, northeastern Thailand.

== History ==
The Ministry of Interior created the "minor district" (king amphoe) Na Chaluai on 1 February 1972, when the three tambons (sub-districts) Na Chaluai, Phon Sawan, and Non Sombun were split off from Det Udom district. The sub-district was later upgraded to a full district on 12 April 1977.

More than 80 percent of Na Chaluai's people moved there from other districts. This area was a battle field of Communist Party of Thailand and the Royal Thai Army during the time of Vietnam War.

== Geography ==
Neighboring districts are (from the west clockwise) Nam Yuen, Det Udom, Buntharik and the Laotian province of Champasak.

Phu Chong-Na Yoi National Park is in the district. The important water resource is the Dom Yai river.

== Administration ==
The district is divided into six sub-districts (tambons), which are further subdivided into 68 villages (mubans). Na Chaluai is a township (thesaban tambon) which covers parts of tambon Na Chaluai. There are a further six tambon administrative organizations.

No.	Name	Thai name	Villages	Pop.
1.	Na Chaluai	นาจะหลวย	16	17,057
2.	Non Sombun	โนนสมบูรณ์	9	6,600
3.	Phon Sawan	พรสวรรค์	10	5,440
4.	Ban Tum	บ้านตูม	14	11,998
5.	Sok Saeng	โสกแสง	10	7,251
6.	Non Sawan	โนนสวรรค์	9	5,428
