= Na Suang =

Coordinates: 15.011141°N 104.948249°E

Na Suang นาส่วง
- Subdistrict
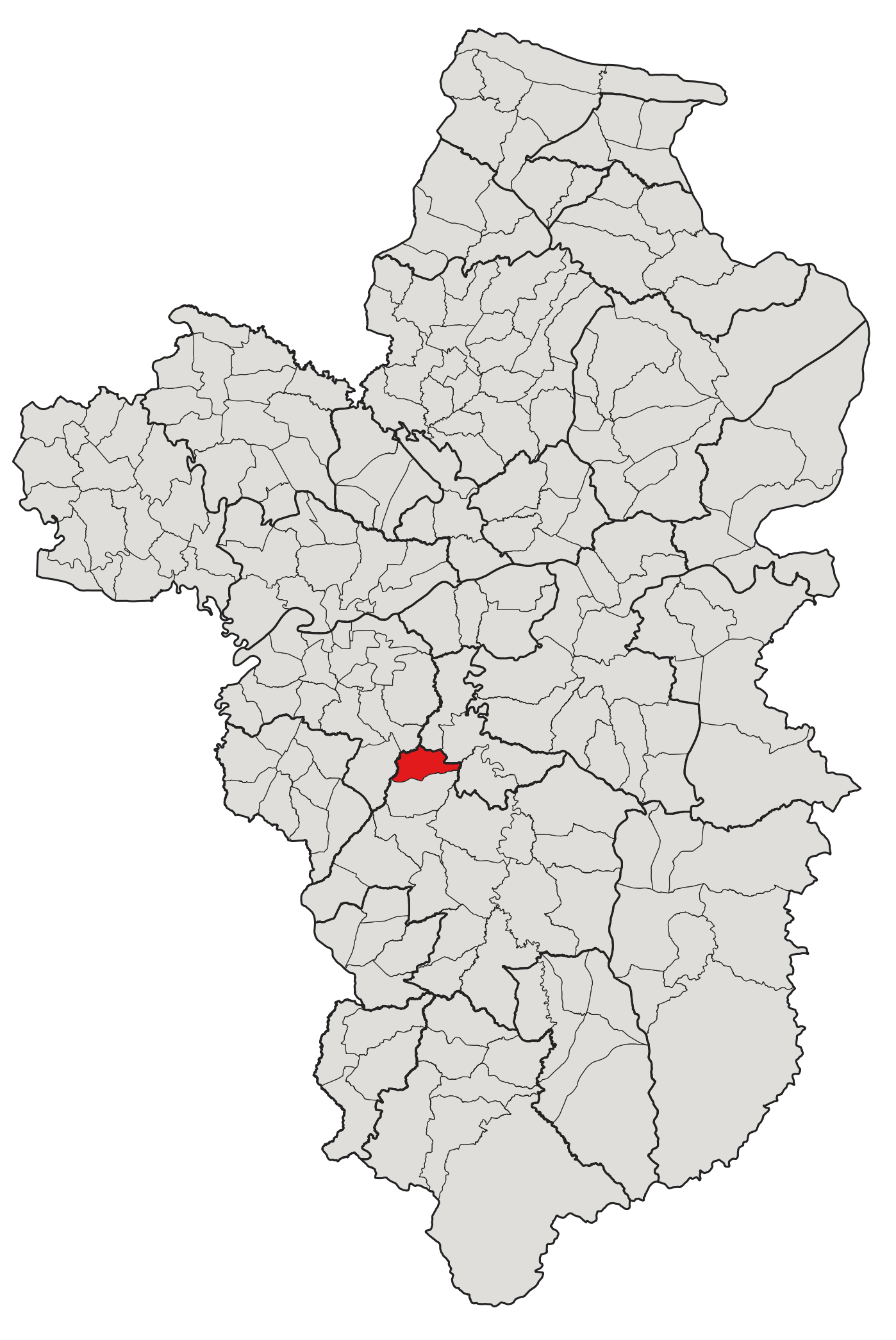
- Subdistrict location in Ubon Ratchathani province
- Country: Thailand
- Province: Ubon Ratchathani
- District: Det Udom
- Mubans: 10
- Number of Mu: 12
- Subdistrict established: 1892

Area
  - Total: 55.40 km^{2} (21.39 sq mi)

Population (2021)
  - Total: 9,044
  - Density: 163.25/km^{2} (422.8/sq mi)
- Time zone: UTC+7 (ICT)
- Postal code: 34160

Na Suang (Thai: นาส่วง) is a tambon (subdistrict) of Det Udom District, in Ubon Ratchathani Province, Thailand. In 2021, it had a population of 9,044 people. Neighbouring subdistricts are (clockwise from the south) Pa Mong, Sa Saming, Mueang Si Khai, Na Di, Na Yia, and Na Rueang.

== History ==
The region was first settled in the 1640s, the first settlement was located in the current location of Na Suang village and gained subdistrict status in 1892. While the Na Suang subdistrict is much older, the Sukhaphiban Na Suang (สุขาภิบาลนาส่วง) as the local administration unit was established in the central region of the tambon in 1963, covered Na Suang and Pa Muang villages, as well as some portions of Kut Yang and Na Huay Khaen, 3.40 km^{2} in total. Effective May 25, 2009, it was upgraded to a subdistrict municipality. The remaining area, around 52 km^{2}, has been governed by another local government, the Subdistrict Administrative Organization of Na Suang.

The tambon were cut off to establish new subdistricts three times including in 1947 to creat Na Yia, in 1966 to creat Na Charoen, and in 1988 to create Pa Mong.

== Geography ==
The tambon is located in the northernmost region of the Det Udom district, which is the low river plain of two tributaries of the Mun River—Khaosan Creek and Khaen Creek—and covered 55.40 kilometers of squares. The total forest area is only 0.51 km^{2} or 9.21 percent of the subdistrict area.

== Administration ==
The tambon is divided into 10 administrative villages (mubans; หมู่บ้าน), two of which, Na Suang (นาส่วง) and Sao Lao (เสาเล้า) villages, each was further divided into two community groups (Mu; หมู่). The area is shared by 2 local governments; the township area was administrated by the Na Suang Subdistrict Municipality (เทศบาลตำบลนาส่วง) while the remaining was covered by the Subdistrict Administrative Organization of Na Suang (องค์การบริหารส่วนตำบลนาส่วง; Na Suang SAO).

The following is a list of the subdistrict's mubans, which roughly correspond to the villages, as of the 2021 census.

Village		Group (Mu)	Local government				Total	
Village		Group (Mu)	Na Suang Township		Na Suang SAO		Total	
Romanized name	Thai name	Group (Mu)	Household	Population	Household	Population	Household	Population
Na Suang	นาส่วง	1	326	999	0	0	326	999
Na Suang	นาส่วง	10	314	789	0	0	314	789
Sao Lao	เสาเล้า	2	0	0	192	596	192	596
Sao Lao	เสาเล้า	4	0	0	265	1,025	265	1,025
Pa Muang	ป่าม่วง	3	250	872	0	0	250	872
Muang	ม่วง	5	0	0	220	676	220	676
Kra Beuang	กระเบื้อง	6	0	0	269	680	269	680
Nong Bua	หนองบัว	7	0	0	135	431	135	431
Kut Yang	กุดยาง	8	85	360	42	139	127	499
Na Huay Khaen	นาห้วยแคน	9	27	107	253	772	280	879
Non Kratae	โนนกระแต	11	0	0	269	680	269	680
Non Chig	โนนจิก	12	0	0	266	773	266	773
Central house Registration			2	2	0	0	0	0
Total			1,004	3,129	1,914	5,915	2,918	9,044
