= Mueang Det =

Coordinates: 14.903467°N 105.075062°E

Mueang Det เมืองเดช
- Subdistrict
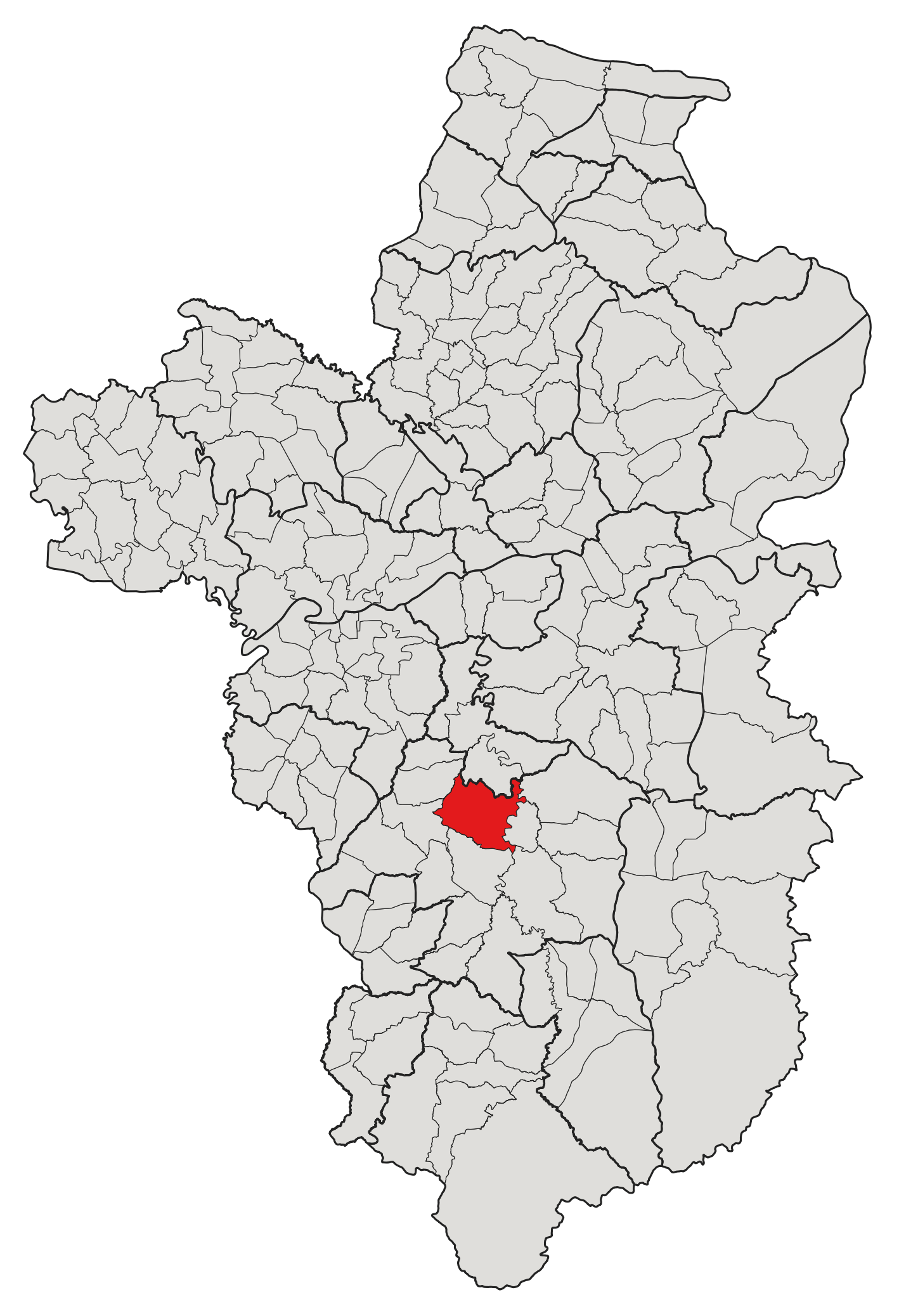
- Subdistrict location in Ubon Ratchathani province
- Country: Thailand
- Province: Ubon Ratchathani
- District: Det Udom
- Mubans: 34
- Mu: 35
- Subdistrict established: 1892

Population (2021)
  - Total: 33,447
- Time zone: UTC+7 (ICT)
- Postal code: 34160

Mueang Det (Thai: เมืองเดช) is a capital tambon (subdistrict) of Det Udom District, in Ubon Ratchathani Province, Thailand. In 2021, it had a population of 33,447 people. Neighbouring subdistricts are (clockwise from the south) Tha Pho Si, Na Charoen, Na Rueang, Kut Prathai, Phon Ngam and Klang.

== History ==
The region was settled in the early 1800s, the first village was named Dom Yai village. The conflict between the governor of Sisaket, Phraya Viset Bhakdee (พระยาวิเศษภักดี), and three royal nobilities, including Luang Thibet (หลวงธิเบศร์), Luang Mahatthai (หลวงมหาดไทย), and Luang Abhai (หลวงอภัย) caused those three clans with members of 2,150 people to evacuate to Dom Yai village in 1845 and the village was promoted to the town named "Det Udom", under the control of the city of Khukhan. After the reformation of the country's administrative division in 1907, 1912, and 1926, the town was governed by Monthon Isan, Monthon Ubon, and Monthon Nakhon Ratchasima, respectively.

In 1892, the town gained subdistrict status and was considered the capital of the former district, Prajim Det Udom (ปจิมเดชอุดม; Western Det Udom), which was later merged with other three districts; Matchim Det Udom" (มัชฌิมเดชุอดม; Central Det Udom), Uthai Det Udom (อุทัยเดชอุดม; Eastern Det Udom), and Dom Pradit (โดมประดิษฐ์), to create a new district, Det Udom district in 1912. While the Muaeng Det subdistrict is much older, the Sukhaphiban Mueang Det (สุขาภิบาลเมืองเดช) as the local administration unit was established in 1956. Effective 1999, it was upgraded to a subdistrict municipality, and then to a town municipality in 2007.

In 1924, due to the repeated floods, the city center was moved from Muaeng Khao village (บ้านเมืองเก่า; Village of the Old City) to the current city government center, Non Khampom (โนนขามป้อม; the mound of Malacca tree).

Some regions of the tambon were cut off to establish new subdistricts several times including Kut Prathai in 1947, Na Charoen in 1966, Tha Pho Si in 1976, Na Rueang in 1977, and Phon Ngam in 1986.

== Geography ==
The tambon was located in the central region of the Det Udom district, which is the low river plain of the Lam Dom Yai river, and covered 30 kilometers of squares.

== Administration ==
The tambon is divided into 34 administrative villages (mubans; หมู่บ้าน), one of them, Som Sa-ard village, was further divided into two community groups (Mu; หมู่). The area is shared by 2 local governments; the township area was administered by the Det Udom Town Municipality (เทศบาลเมืองเดชอุดม) while the remaining was covered by the Subdistrict Administrative Organization of Mueang Det (องค์การบริหารส่วนตำบลเมืองเดช; Mueang Det SAO).

The following is a list of the subdistrict's mubans, which roughly correspond to the villages, as of the 2021 census.

Village		Group (Mu)	Local government				Total	
Village		Group (Mu)	Det Udom Township		Mueang Det SAO		Total	
Romanized name	Thai name	Group (Mu)	Household	Population	Household	Population	Household	Population
Muaeng Khao	เมืองเก่า	1	0	0	365	953	365	953
Talad	ตลาด	2	670	1,270	96	239	766	1,509
Khaem	แขม	3	0	0	334	705	334	705
Som Sa-ard	สมสะอาด	4	0	0	310	1,054	310	1,054
Som Sa-ard	สมสะอาด	27	0	0	400	1,202	400	1,202
Nong Saeng Tai	หนองแสงใต้	5	343	776	0	0	343	776
Khok Theun Chang	โคกเถื่อนช้าง	6	0	0	383	1,005	383	1,005
Nong Saeng	หนองแสง	7	929	1,389	0	0	929	1,389
Pa Ko	ป่าก่อ	8	741	2,185	0	0	741	2,185
Kut Wai	กุดหวาย	9	0	0	250	705	250	705
Nong Samran	หนองสำราญ	10	0	0	651	1,234	651	1,234
Vieng Kasem	เวียงเกษม	11	265	858	192	384	457	1,242
Daen Kasem	แดนเกษม	12	337	1,123	0	0	337	1,123
Nong Hua Ling	หนองหัวลิง	13	0	0	86	315	86	315
Don Sao Hong	ดอนเสาโฮง	14	195	329	382	740	577	1,069
Chaeng Sawang	แจ้งสว่าง	15	0	0	274	690	274	690
Khaem Charoen	แขมเจริญ	16	0	0	408	1,071	408	1,071
Muaeng Mai	เมืองใหม่	17	213	525	488	951	701	1,476
Chai Mongkon	ชัยมงคล	18	0	0	407	794	407	794
Chai Udom	ชัยอุดม	19	1,332	2,230	222	241	1,554	2,471
Non Pho	โนนโพธิ์	20	0	0	287	541	287	541
Saen Tor	แสนตอ	21	655	1,020	0	0	655	1,020
Lao Charoen	เหล่าเจริญ	22	0	0	302	798	302	798
Sri Udom	ศรีอุดม	23	224	558	93	136	317	694
Nong Saeng Neua	หนองแสงเหนือ	24	780	901	0	0	780	901
Non Sap	โนนทรัพย์	25	0	0	488	995	488	995
Thep Kasem	เทพเกษม	26	0	0	147	377	147	377
Non Pho Tai	โนนโพธิ์ใต้	28	0	0	185	482	185	482
Non Sooksan	โนนสุขสันต์	29	0	0	278	550	278	550
Don Sao Hong Pattana	ดอนเสาโฮงพัฒนา	30	0	0	386	1,030	386	1,030
Khok Charoen	โคกเจริญ	31	0	0	206	549	206	549
Rong Ruam Wut	ร่องรวมวุฒิ	32	0	0	247	741	247	741
Chai Charoen	ชัยเจริญ	33	0	0	192	548	192	548
Huay Khum	ห้วยคุ้ม	34	0	0	177	537	177	537
Thung Sai Ngam	ทุ่งไทรงาม	35	0	0	206	519	206	519
Central House Registration			2	129	2	75	4	204
Total			6,686	13,293	8,443	20,154	15,129	33,447
