= Samrong district =

Samrong สำโรง
- District
- Districtlocation in Ubon Ratchathani province
- Coordinates: 15°0′30″N 104°46′56″E
- Country: Thailand
- Province: Ubon Ratchathani
- Seat: Samrong

Area
  - Total: 416.0 km^{2} (160.6 sq mi)

Population (2005)
  - Total: 51,959
  - Density: 124.9/km^{2} (323/sq mi)
- Time zone: UTC+7 (ICT)
- Postal code: 34360
- Geocode: 3422

Samrong (Thai: สำโรง, pronounced [sǎm.rōːŋ]) is a district (amphoe) in the western part of Ubon Ratchathani province, northeastern Thailand.

== History ==
The minor district (king amphoe) Samrong was created on 15 April 1985, when the six tambons Samrong, Khok Kong, Nong Hai, Kho Noi, Non Ka Len, and Khok Sawang were split off from Warin Chamrap district. It was upgraded to a full district on 9 May 1992.

== Geography ==
Neighboring districts are (from the north clockwise): Warin Chamrap and Det Udom of Ubon Ratchathani Province; and Non Khun and Kanthararom of Sisaket province.

== Administration ==
The district is divided into nine sub-districts (tambon), which are further subdivided into 111 villages (muban). There are no municipal (thesaban) areas, and nine tambon administrative organizations (TAO).

No.	Name	Thai name	Villages	Pop.
1.	Samrong	สำโรง	15	6,690
2.	Khok Kong	โคกก่อง	17	5,703
3.	Nong Hai	หนองไฮ	12	6,250
4.	Kho Noi	ค้อน้อย	17	7,678
5.	Non Ka Len	โนนกาเล็น	12	7,563
6.	Khok Sawang	โคกสว่าง	12	7,905
7.	Non Klang	โนนกลาง	10	4,366
8.	Bon	บอน	7	3,268
9.	Kham Pom	ขามป้อม	9	2,536
