= Tha Pho Si =

Coordinates: 14.846441°N 05.042162°E

Tha Pho Si ท่าโพธิ์ศรี
- Subdistrict
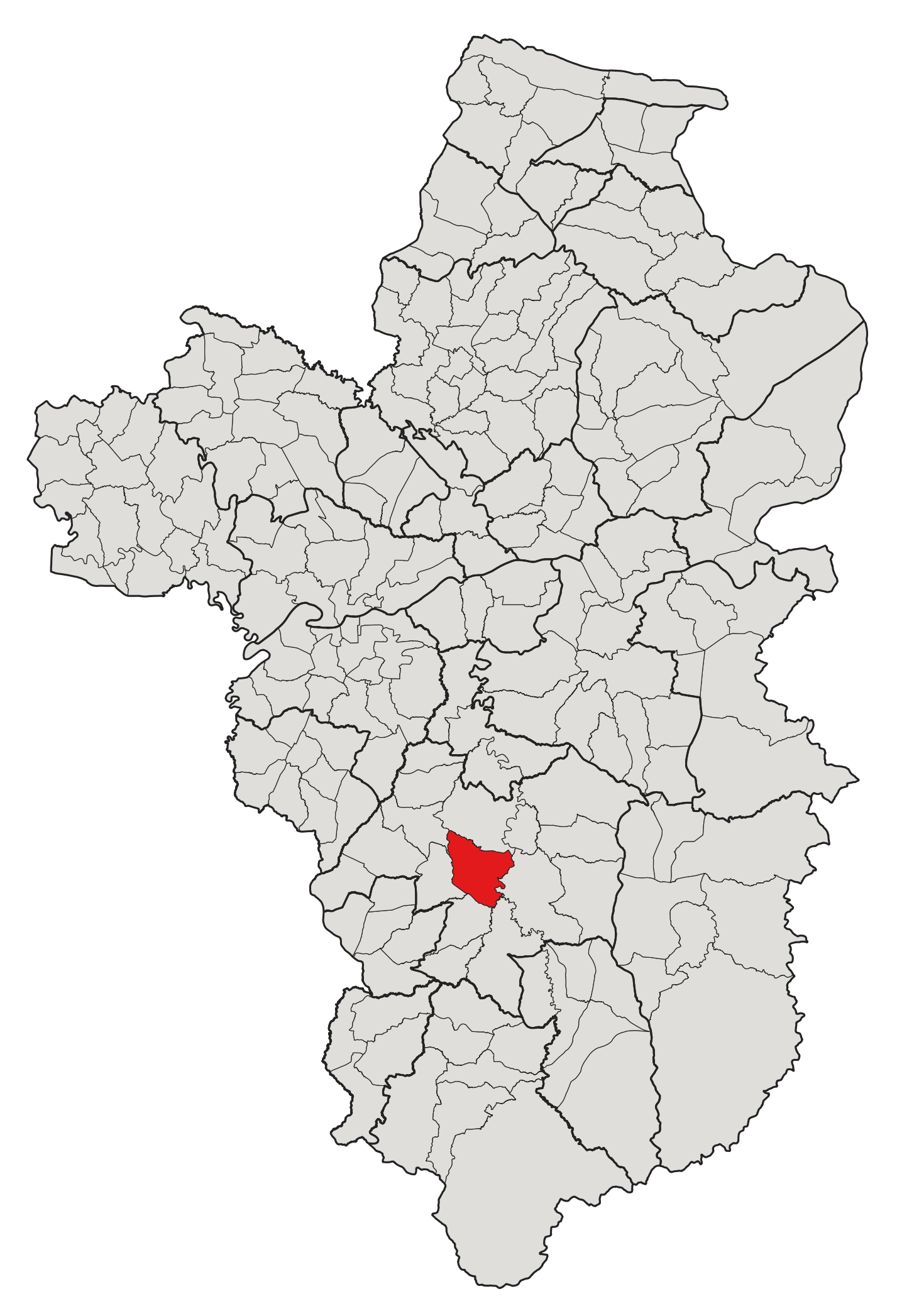
- Subdistrict location in Ubon Ratchathani province
- Country: Thailand
- Province: Ubon Ratchathani
- District: Det Udom
- Mubans: 8
- Number of Mu: 11
- Subdistrict established: 1976

Area
  - Total: 69 km^{2} (27 sq mi)

Population (2021)
  - Total: 7,056
  - Density: 102.26/km^{2} (264.9/sq mi)
- Time zone: UTC+7 (ICT)
- Postal code: 34160

Tha Pho Si (Thai: ท่าโพธิ์ศรี) is a tambon (subdistrict) located in the central region of Det Udom District, in Ubon Ratchathani Province, Thailand. In 2021, it had a population of 7,056 people. Neighbouring subdistricts are (clockwise from the south) Top Hu, Non Sombun, Na Charoen, Mueang Det, and Klang.

== History ==
The area was first settled in the late 1800s, with the first village, Bak Waeng (บักแหว่ง), governed by Mueang Det, the district capital. The settlement was eventually renamed "Tha Pho Si" in 1902, after the giant sandbox tree (Thai: โพธิ์ศรี; Pho Si) that was founded near the waterfront pavilion on the bank of the Lam Dom Yai River.

The Tha Pho Si subdistrict was formed in 1976 by combining two areas splitting from Mueang Det and Klang, which consisted of five and one villages, respectively.

== Geography ==
The tambon is located in the central region of the Det Udom district, on the low river plain of the Lam Dom Yai River.

== Administration ==
The Tha Pho Si subdistrict is divided into eight administrative villages (mubans; หมู่บ้าน), one of which, Tha Pho Si village, was further divided into four community groups (Mu; หมู่). The entire area is governed by the Subdistrict Administrative Organization of Tha Pho Si (องค์การบริหารส่วนตำบลท่าโพธิ์ศรี; Tha Pho Si SAO).

As of the 2021 census, it had a population of 7,056 people with 2,550 households. The following is a list of the subdistrict's mubans, which roughly correspond to the villages.

Village		Group (Mu)	Household	Population
Romanized name	Thai name	Group (Mu)	Household	Population
Tha Pho Si	ท่าโพธิ์ศรี	1	229	652
Tha Pho Si	ท่าโพธิ์ศรี	2	220	743
Tha Pho Si	ท่าโพธิ์ศรี	7	290	693
Tha Pho Si	ท่าโพธิ์ศรี	10	234	706
Pho Sa-nga	โพธิ์สง่า	3	426	973
Non Li	โนนหลี่	4	105	318
Non That	โนนธาตุ	5	179	662
Waree Udom	วารีอุดม	6	242	812
Non Swang	โนนสว่าง	8	177	405
Na Dong	นาดง	9	178	415
Thong Lang	ทองหลาง	11	270	677
Total			2,550	7,056
