= Warin Chamrap district =

Warin Chamrap วารินชำราบ
- District
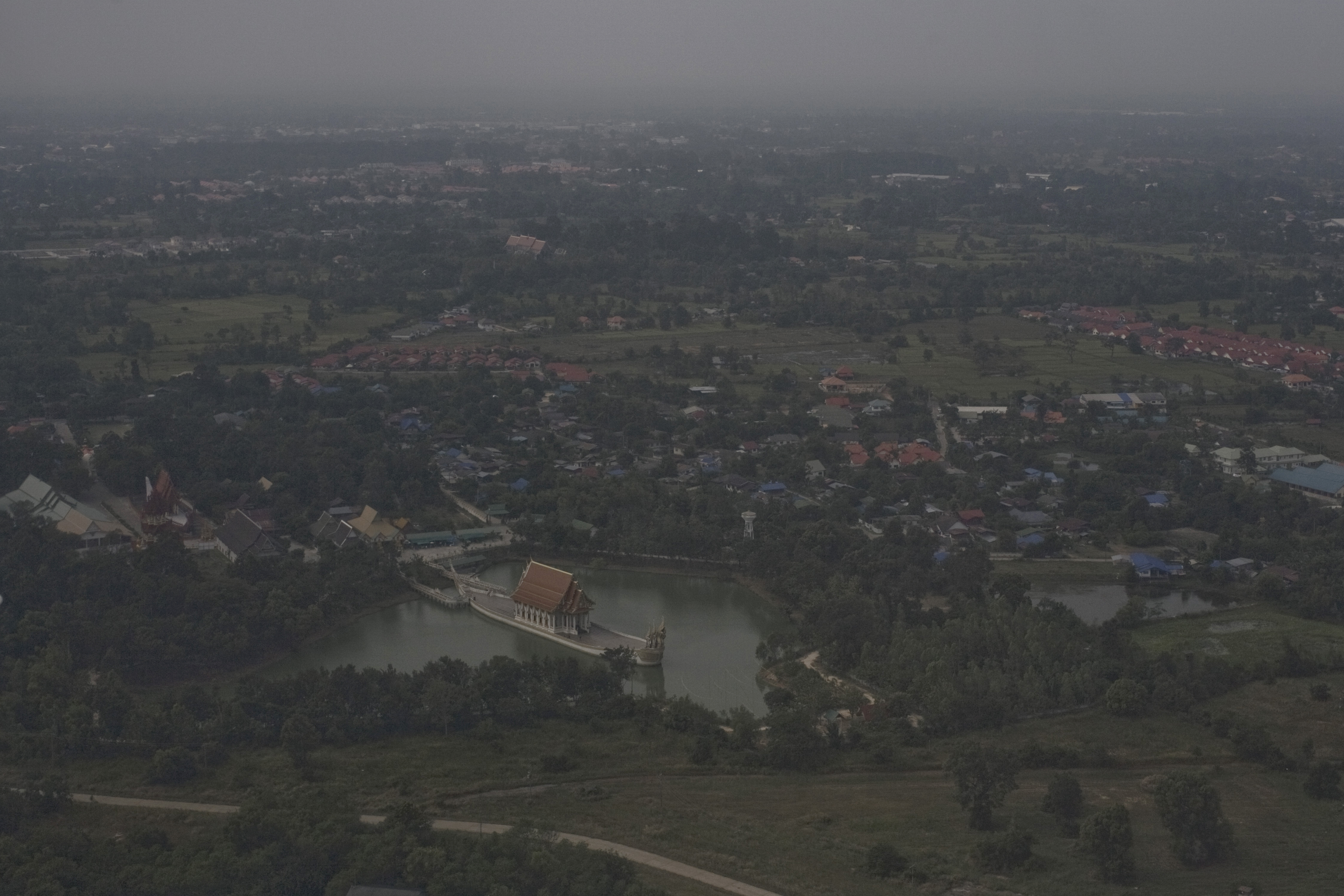
- Aerial view of Warin Chamrap on November 3, 2010

- District location in Ubon Ratchathani province
- Coordinates: 15°12′9″N 104°52′3″E
- Country: Thailand
- Province: Ubon Ratchathani
- Seat: Warin Chamrap

Area
  - Total: 691.0 km^{2} (266.8 sq mi)

Population (2005)
  - Total: 156,355
  - Density: 226.3/km^{2} (586/sq mi)
- Time zone: UTC+7 (ICT)
- Postal code: 34190
- Geocode: 3415

Warin Chamrap (Thai: วารินชำราบ, pronounced [wāː.rīn tɕʰām.râːp]; Northeastern Thai: วารินซำราบ, pronounced [wa᷇ː.li᷇n sa᷇m.lâːp]) is a district (amphoe) in the western part of Ubon Ratchathani province, northeastern Thailand (Isan).

== Geography ==
Neighboring districts are (from the north clockwise) Mueang Ubon Ratchathani, Sawang Wirawong, Na Yia, Det Udom, Samrong of Ubon Ratchathani Province, and Kanthararom of Sisaket province.

The important water resource is the Mun River. Warin Chamrap is located just 2 kilometers (1 mi) from Mueang Ubon Ratchathani, with Mun River between them.

== History ==
In 1913 the district was renamed from Thaksin Ubon (ทักษิณอุบล) to Warin Chamrap.

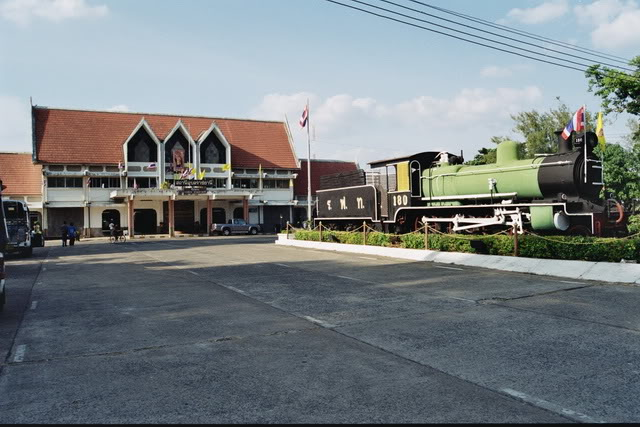
Ubon Ratchathani Railway Station

Since 1938, Warin Chamrap has been the eastern terminus of the northeastern railway line from Bangkok's central Hua Lamphong Railway Station via the Nakhon Ratchasima Railway Station.

== Education ==
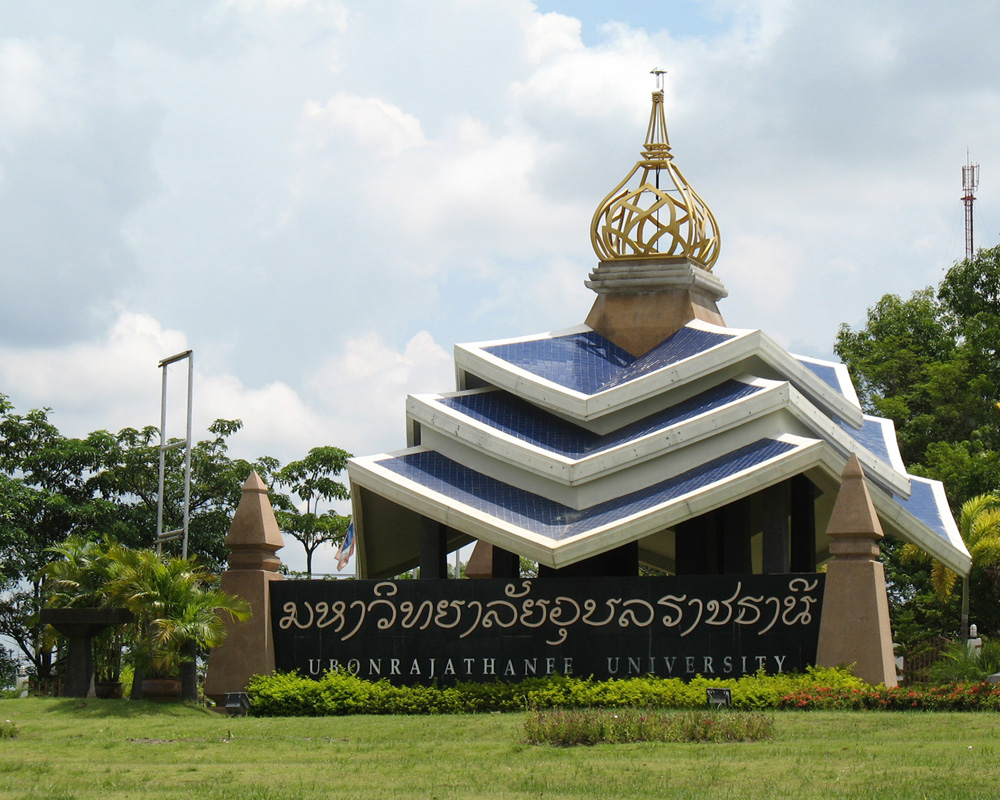
Ubon Ratchathani University Gate

Ubon Ratchathani University is in Warin Chamrap District.

== Administration ==
The district is divided into 16 sub-districts (tambons), which are further subdivided into 185 villages (mubans). The town (thesaban mueang) Warin Chamrap covers the tambon Warin Chamrap. There are two more townships (thesaban tambon): Saen Suk covers tambon Saen Suk, and Huai Kha Yung covers parts of tambon Huai Kha Yung. There are a further 15 tambon administrative organizations (TAO).

No.	Name	Thai name	Villages	Pop.
1.	Warin Chamrap	วารินชำราบ	-	30,725
2.	That	ธาตุ	10	5,372
4.	Tha Lat	ท่าลาด	12	6,940
5.	Non Non	โนนโหนน	12	6,435
7.	Khu Mueang	คูเมือง	12	7,436
8.	Sa Saming	สระสมิง	16	7,795
10.	Kham Nam Saep	คำน้ำแซบ	9	8,412
11.	Bung Wai	บุ่งหวาย	20	10,390
15.	Kham Khwang	คำขวาง	8	7,263
16.	Pho Yai	โพธิ์ใหญ่	13	7,476
18.	Saen Suk	แสนสุข	20	22,375
20.	Nong Kin Phen	หนองกินเพล	9	6,704
21.	Non Phueng	โนนผึ้ง	10	6,653
22.	Mueang Si Khai	เมืองศรีไค	10	8,071
24.	Huai Khayung	ห้วยขะยูง	13	6,443
26.	Bung Mai	บุ่งไหม	11	7,865

Missing numbers are tambon which now form the districts Samrong and Sawang Wirawong.
