= Thung Si Udom district =

Thung Si Udom ทุ่งศรีอุดม
- District
- District location in Ubon Ratchathani province
- Coordinates: 14°44′0″N 104°54′36″E
- Country: Thailand
- Province: Ubon Ratchathani
- Seat: Khok Chamrae

Area
  - Total: 307.0 km^{2} (118.5 sq mi)

Population (2005)
  - Total: 26,986
  - Density: 87.9/km^{2} (228/sq mi)
- Time zone: UTC+7 (ICT)
- Postal code: 34160
- Geocode: 3426

Thung Si Udom (Thai: ทุ่งศรีอุดม) is a district (amphoe) in the southwestern part of Ubon Ratchathani province, northeastern Thailand.

== Geography ==
Neighboring districts are (from the north clockwise): Det Udom, Nam Khun of Ubon Ratchathani Province and Kantharalak of Sisaket province.

== History ==
The minor district (king amphoe) Thung Si Udom was created on 1 April 1992, when six tambons were split off from Det Udom district. The inclusion of tambon Thung Thoeng into the new district was undone on 1 June 1993. The minor district was upgraded to a full district on 10 October 1997.

== Administration ==
The district is divided into five sub-districts (tambon), which are further subdivided into 52 villages (muban). There are no municipal (thesaban) areas, and five tambon administrative organizations (TAO).

No.	Name	Thai name	Villages	Pop.
2.	Nong Om	หนองอ้ม	10	5,801
3.	Na Kasem	นาเกษม	11	5,338
4.	Kut Ruea	กุดเรือ	10	5,795
5.	Khok Chamrae	โคกชำแระ	10	5,661
6.	Na Hom	นาห่อม	11	4,391

Geocode 1 was assigned to Thung Thoeng, which was returned to Det Udom district
