= Kanthararom district =

Kanthararom กันทรารมย์
- District
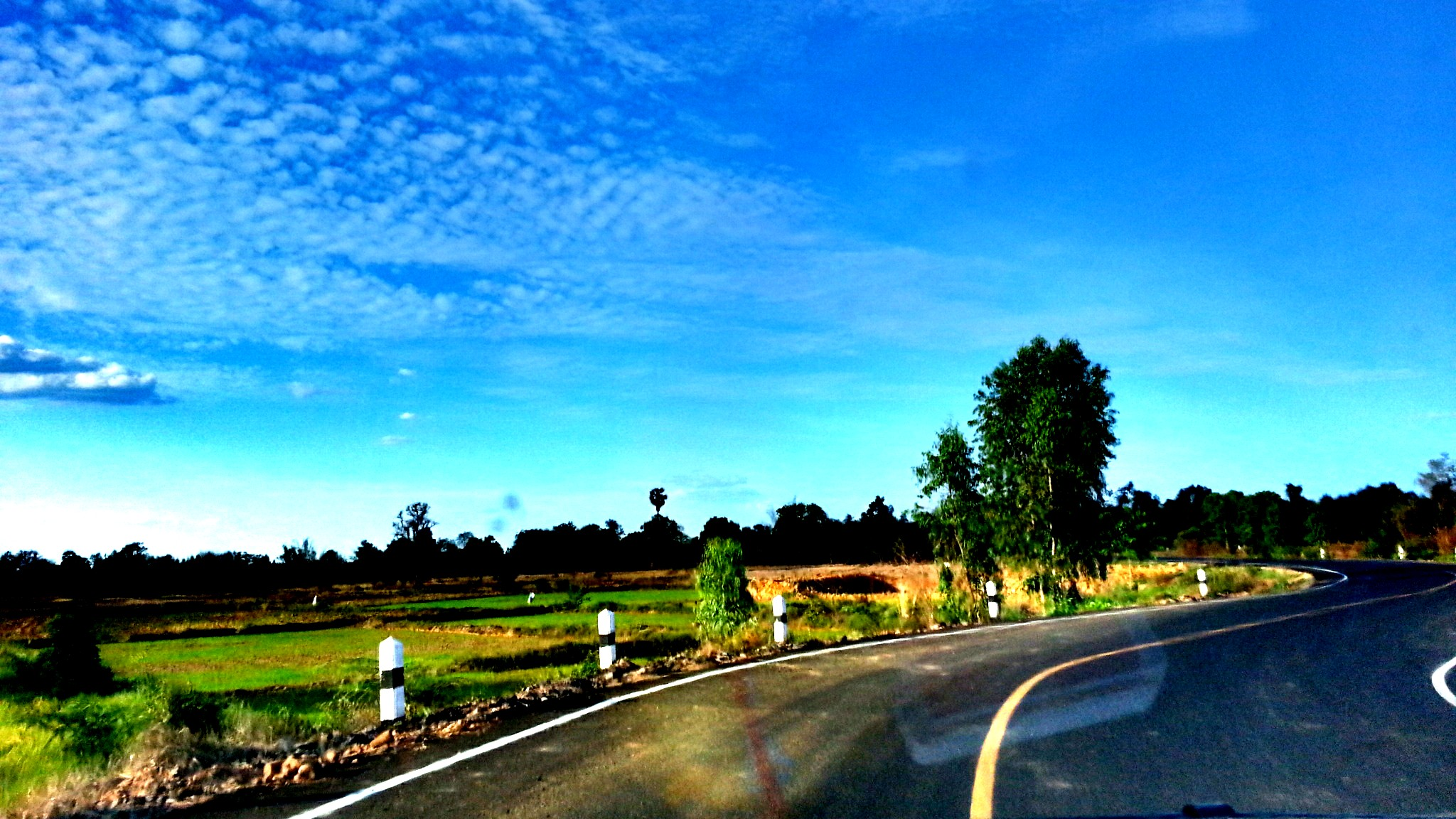
- Thailand Route 2412

- District location in Sisaket province
- Coordinates: 15°6′24″N 104°34′12″E
- Country: Thailand
- Province: Sisaket
- Seat: Kanthararom

Area
  - Total: 664.21 km^{2} (256.45 sq mi)

Population (2005)
  - Total: 100,370
  - Density: 151.1/km^{2} (391/sq mi)
- Time zone: UTC+7 (ICT)
- Postal code: 33130
- Geocode: 3303

Kanthararom (Thai: กันทรารมย์, pronounced [kān.tʰā.rāː.rōm]) is a district (amphoe) in northeastern Sisaket province, in northeast Thailand.

== History ==
The district was established in 1897, then named Uthai Si Sa Ket (อุทัยศีร์ษะเกษ). It was renamed Kanthararom in 1913. In 1926 the district office was moved to Ban Khambon in tambon Dun.

== Geography ==
Neighboring districts are (from the south clockwise): Non Khun, Nam Kliang, Mueang Sisaket, and Yang Chum Noi of Sisaket Province; Khueang Nai, Mueang Ubon Ratchathani, Warin Chamrap, and Samrong.

== Administration ==
The district is divided into 16 sub-districts (tambons), which are further subdivided into 169 villages (mubans). Kanthararom is a township (thesaban tambon) which covers parts of tambon Dun. There are a further 16 tambon administrative organizations (TAO).

No.	Name	Thai name	Villages	Pop.
1.	Dun	ดูน	10	9,506
2.	Non Sang	โนนสัง	14	7,195
3.	Nong Hua Chang	หนองหัวช้าง	12	7,757
4.	Yang	ยาง	12	7,180
5.	Nong Waeng	หนองแวง	10	6,188
6.	Nong Kaeo	หนองแก้ว	7	4,443
7.	Tham	ทาม	11	7,942
8.	Lathai	ละทาย	9	6,213
9.	Mueang Noi	เมืองน้อย	10	4,555
10.	I Pat	อีปาด	5	3,449
11.	Bua Noi	บัวน้อย	11	5,777
12.	Nong Bua	หนองบัว	7	3,914
13.	Du	ดู่	8	4,134
14.	Phak Phaeo	ผักแพว	18	8,367
15.	Chan	จาน	15	8,313
20.	Kham Niam	คำเนียม	10	5,437

Missing numbers are tambons which now form Nam Kliang District.
