= Det Udom district =

Det Udom เดชอุดม
- District
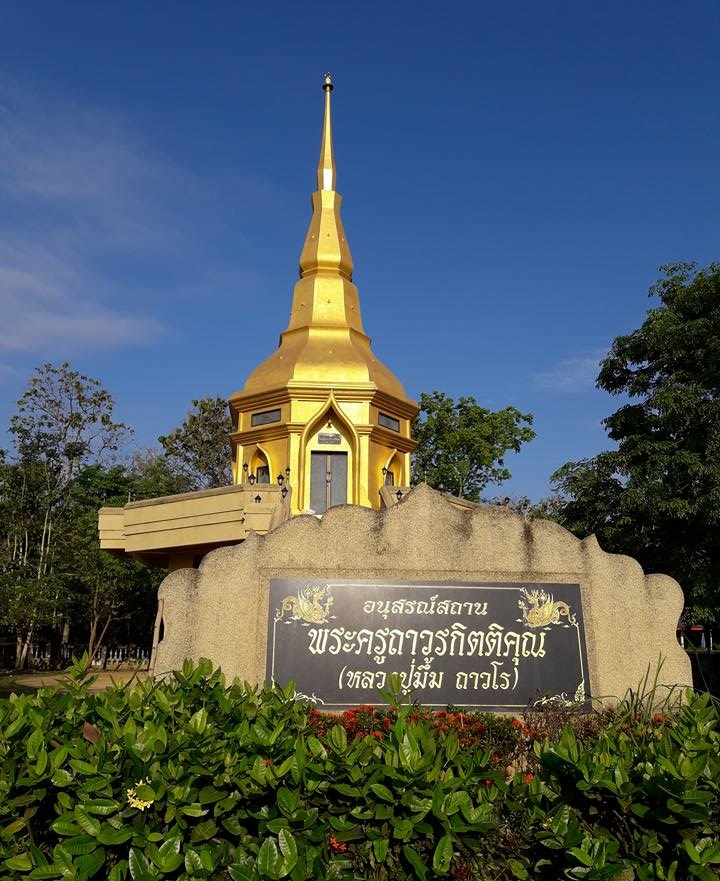
- The pagoda in Junthummawas Temple, Bua Ngam sub-district.

- District location in Ubon Ratchathani province
- Coordinates: 14°54′11″N 105°4′35″E
- Country: Thailand
- Province: Ubon Ratchathani

Area
  - Total: 1,189.0 km^{2} (459.1 sq mi)

Population (2005)
  - Total: 169,896
  - Density: 142.9/km^{2} (370/sq mi)
- Time zone: UTC+7 (ICT)
- Postal code: 34160
- Geocode: 3407

Det Udom (Thai: เดชอุดม) is a district (amphoe) in the southern part of Ubon Ratchathani province, in northeastern Thailand.

== Geography ==
Neighboring districts are (from the northwest clockwise) Samrong, Warin Chamrap, Na Yia, Phibun Mangsahan, Buntharik, Na Chaluai, Nam Yuen, Nam Khun, Thung Si Udom of Ubon Ratchathani Province, and Benchalak of Sisaket province

== Administration ==
The district is divided into 16 sub-districts (tambons), which are further subdivided into 229 villages (mubans). Mueang Det is a town (thesaban mueang) covering parts of the same-named tambon. There are also three townships (thesaban tambons): Na Suang and Bua Ngam each cover parts of the same-named tambon, and Kut Prathai covers tambon Kut Prathai. There are a further 10 tambon administrative organizations (TAO).

No.	Name	Thai name	Villages	Pop.
1.	Mueang Det	เมืองเดช	31	32,919
2.	Na Suang	นาส่วง	12	8,943
4.	Na Charoen	นาเจริญ	11	6,963
6.	Thung Thoeng	ทุ่งเทิง	15	8,180
8.	Som Sa-at	สมสะอาด	12	10,413
9.	Kut Prathai	กุดประทาย	20	12,613
10.	Top Hu	ตบหู	21	11,406
11.	Klang	กลาง	17	14,269
12.	Kaeng	แก้ง	11	7,866
13.	Tha Pho Si	ท่าโพธิ์ศรี	10	6,477
15.	Bua Ngam	บัวงาม	16	11,953
16.	Kham Khrang	คำครั่ง	10	6,180
17.	Na Krasaeng	นากระแซง	12	13,020
20.	Phon Ngam	โพนงาม	12	8,585
21.	Pa Mong	ป่าโมง	10	4,535
23.	Non Sombun	โนนสมบูรณ์	9	5,574

Missing numbers are tambons which now form Districts Na Yia and Thung Si Udom.
