= Na Pho, Buntharik =

Coordinates: 14.916520°N 105.289603°E

Na Pho นาโพธิ์
- Subdistrict
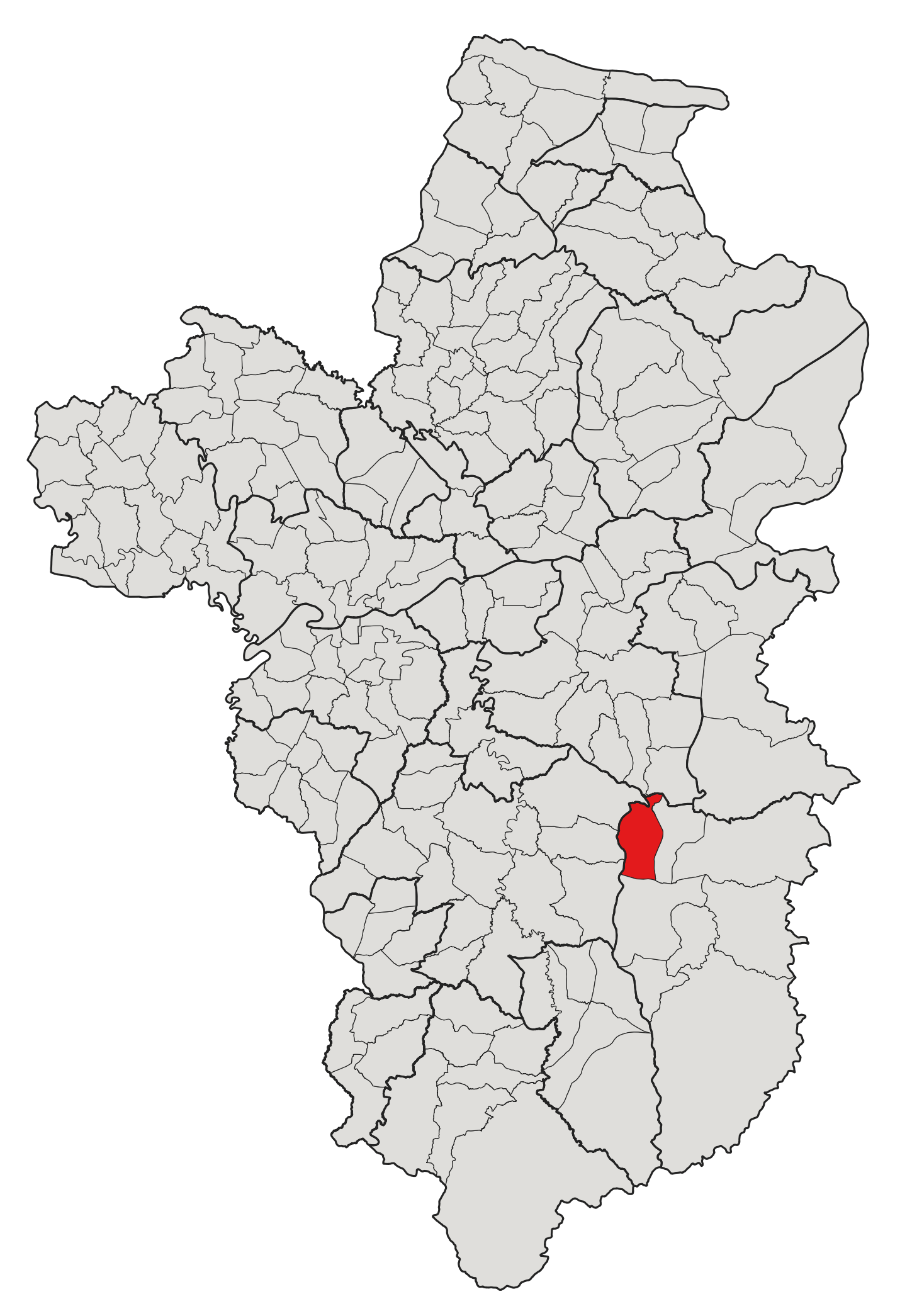
- Subdistrict location in Ubon Ratchathani province
- Country: Thailand
- Province: Ubon Ratchathani
- District: Buntharik
- Number of Muban: 11
- Number of Mu: 11
- Subdistrict established: 1973

Area
  - Total: 78.40 km^{2} (30.27 sq mi)

Population (2021)
  - Total: 8,817
  - Density: 112.46/km^{2} (291.3/sq mi)
- Time zone: UTC+7 (ICT)
- Postal code: 34230

Na Pho (Thai: นาโพธิ์) is a tambon (subdistrict) located in the northwestern region of Buntharik district, in Ubon Ratchathani Province, Thailand. In 2021, it had a population of 8,817 people. Neighbouring subdistricts are (clockwise from the south) Nong Sano, Bua Ngam, Kham Khrang, Kut Prathai, Ang Sila, Non Kalong, and Ban Maet.

== History ==
The area was originally covered by deciduous dipterocarp forest and controlled by Kho Laen. Around the early 1800s, seven families from "Ban Khua Mi" (บ้านขัวหมี), which is now Nong Bua village (บ้านหนองบัว) in the Kho Laen subdistrict, relocated to the area and decided to construct a new hamlet called "Ban Huay Rai" (บ้านห้วยไร่), followed by another group of evacuees from the Phibun Mangsahan district. However, due to the outbreak, a new hamlet was temporarily abandoned, and the original residents eventually returned after being compelled to resettle in a nearby new location.

The hamlet later gained official village status and was renamed "Na Pho", with Butsri Lue-det (บุตรศรี ลือเดช) as the first village headman, and eventually became the new subdistrict capital when the same-named tambon (subdistrict) was created in 1973 by the splitting of eight villages in the Kho Laen subdistrict's half-western region. Later in 1987, seven villages in the eastern area of tambon Na Pho were cut off to form a new subdistrict, Ban Maet.

After its establishment, the tambon was governed by the Subdistrict Council of Na Pho until it was promoted to the Subdistrict Administrative Organization (SAO) in 1997, and to the subdistrict municipality in 2012.

== Geography ==
The tambon covers 78.4 km^{2} and is located in the northwestern region of the Buntharik district, on the Lam Dom Noi river basins in the east and north, with lowlands alternating with some highland in the west and south.

== Administration ==
The subdistrict of Na Pho is divided into 11 villages (mubans; หมู่บ้าน). As of the 2021 census, it had a population of 8,817 people with 2,834 households.

Since 2012, the Na Pho Subdistrict Municipality (เทศบาลตำบลนาโพธิ์) has been the local government responding to administer the area.

The following is a list of the subdistrict's mubans, which roughly correspond to the villages.

Village		Group (Mu)	Household	Population
Romanized name	Thai name	Group (Mu)	Household	Population
Na Pho	นาโพธิ์	1	252	776
Khai	ค่าย	2	258	774
No Khueang	โนนเขือง	3	248	816
Don Tano	ดอนตะโน	4	280	896
Klang	กลาง	5	319	827
Na Pho Tai	นาโพธิ์ใต้	6	229	665
Khum Kham	ขุมคำ	7	212	776
Na Pho Klang	นาโพธิ์กลาง	8	305	759
Sum Ngua	ซำงัว	9	217	737
Non Charoen	โนนเจริญ	10	302	1,004
Don Charoen	ดอนเจริญ	11	212	687
Central House Registration			0	0
Total			2,824	8,817
