= Klang, Det Udom =

Coordinates: 14.838748°N 105.109645°E

Klang กลาง
- Subdistrict
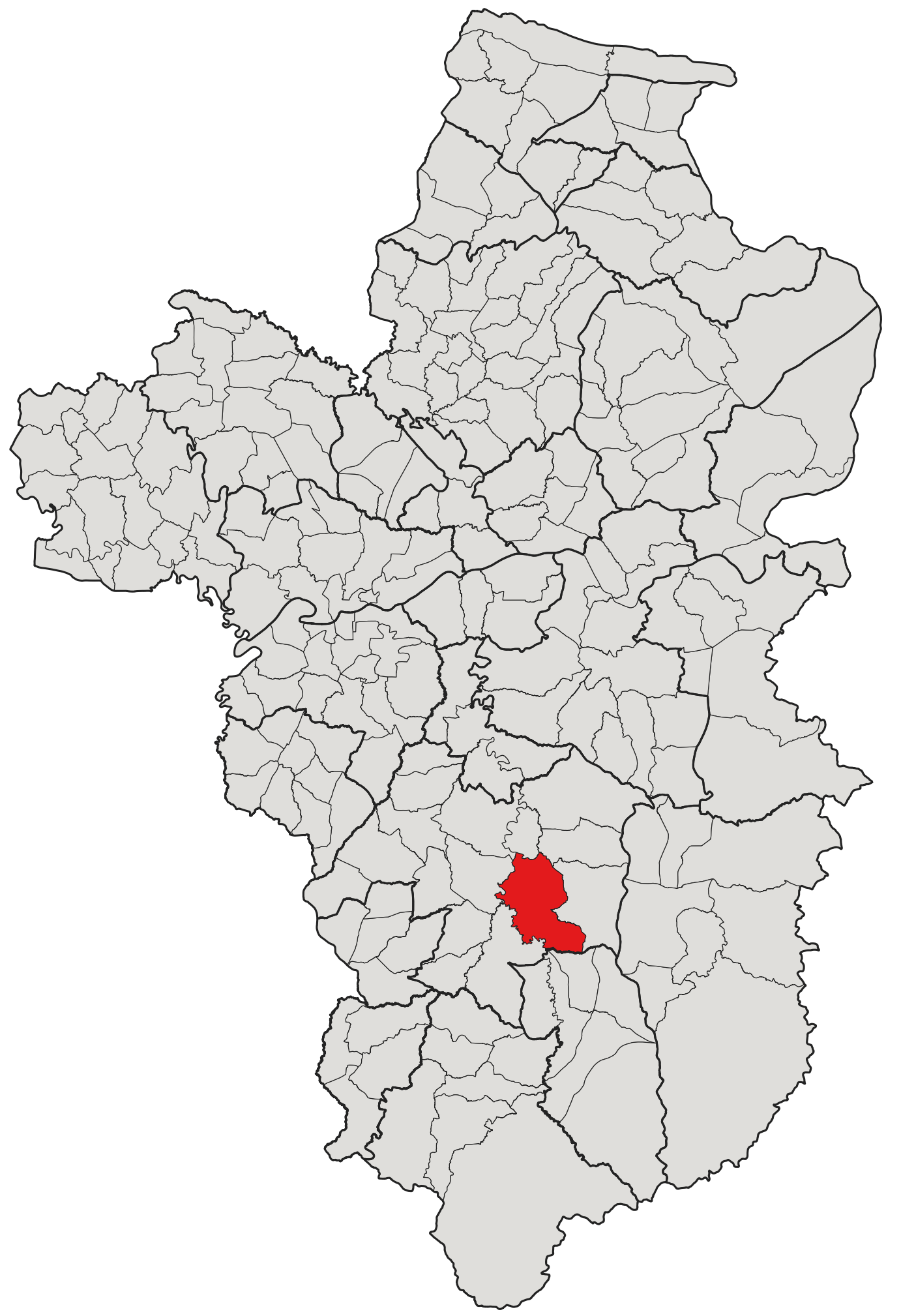
- Subdistrict location in Ubon Ratchathani province
- Country: Thailand
- Province: Ubon Ratchathani
- District: Det Udom
- Mubans: 12
- Mu: 18
- Subdistrict established: 1912

Population (2021)
  - Total: 14,470
- Time zone: UTC+7 (ICT)
- Postal code: 34160

Klang (Thai: กลาง) is a tambon (subdistrict) of Det Udom District, in Ubon Ratchathani Province, Thailand. In 2021, it had a population of 14,470 people. Neighbouring subdistricts are (clockwise from the south) Non Sombun, Non Sawan, Top Hu, Tha Pho Si, Mueang Det, Phon Ngam, Kham Khrang, and Bua Ngam.

== History ==
In 1907, Klang village was the administrative center of a former district "Matchim Det Udom" (มัชฌิมเดชุอดม; Central Det Udom), which was later merged with three other districts, Prajim Det Udom (ปจิมเดชอุดม; Western Det Udom), Uthai Det Udom (Eastern Det Udom), and Dom Pradit, to create a new district, Det Udom district in 1912.

In 1972, together with five villages split from Na Chaluai, five of the villages in Klang were broke off to form a new subdistrict, Non Sombun, which currently is a tambon in Na Chaluai district.

In 1976, a village on the bank of the Lam Dom Yai River, Waree Udom (วารีอุดม), was split off to establish a new subdistrict, Tha Pho Si, by combining with five other villages on the other side of the river, which had been split from Mueang Det.

In 1979, the eastern region became an independent subdistrict, Bua Ngam.

== Geography ==
The tambon is located in the mid-east region of Det Udom district, which is the river plain of the Lam Dom Yai river.

== Administration ==
The tambon is divided into twelve administrative villages (mubans; หมู่บ้าน) which are further divided into eighteen community groups (Mu; หมู่). All of which were governed by the Subdistrict Administrative Organization of Kham Khrang (องค์การบริหารส่วนตำบลกลาง).

The following is a list of the subdistrict's mubans, which roughly correspond to the villages:

Village		Group (Mu)	Household (as of 2021)	Population (as of 2021)
Romanized name	Thai name	Group (Mu)	Household (as of 2021)	Population (as of 2021)
Klang	กลาง	1	643	1,161
Klang	กลาง	15	347	855
Bok	บก	2	287	678
Bok	บก	14	376	883
Mhak Maai	หมากมาย	3	464	1,055
Mhak Maai	หมากมาย	13	294	625
Mhak Maai	หมากมาย	17	284	832
Mek Yai	เม็กใหญ่	4	307	817
Mek Yai	เม็กใหญ่	18	202	461
Non Sawan	โนนสวรรค์	5	498	1,106
Hlub Lao	หลุบเลา	6	294	743
Mek Noi	เม็กน้อย	7	276	671
Mek Noi	เม็กน้อย	16	395	1,024
Non	โนน	8	568	1,139
Bua Tiam	บัวเทียม	9	301	855
Non Yai	โนนใหญ่	10	250	606
Kham Samran	คำสำราญ	11	149	444
Non Kham Klang	โนนคำกลาง	12	196	517
Total			6,131	14,470
