= Bua Ngam, Buntharik =

Coordinates: 14.785484°N 105.374619°E

Bua Ngam บัวงาม
- Subdistrict
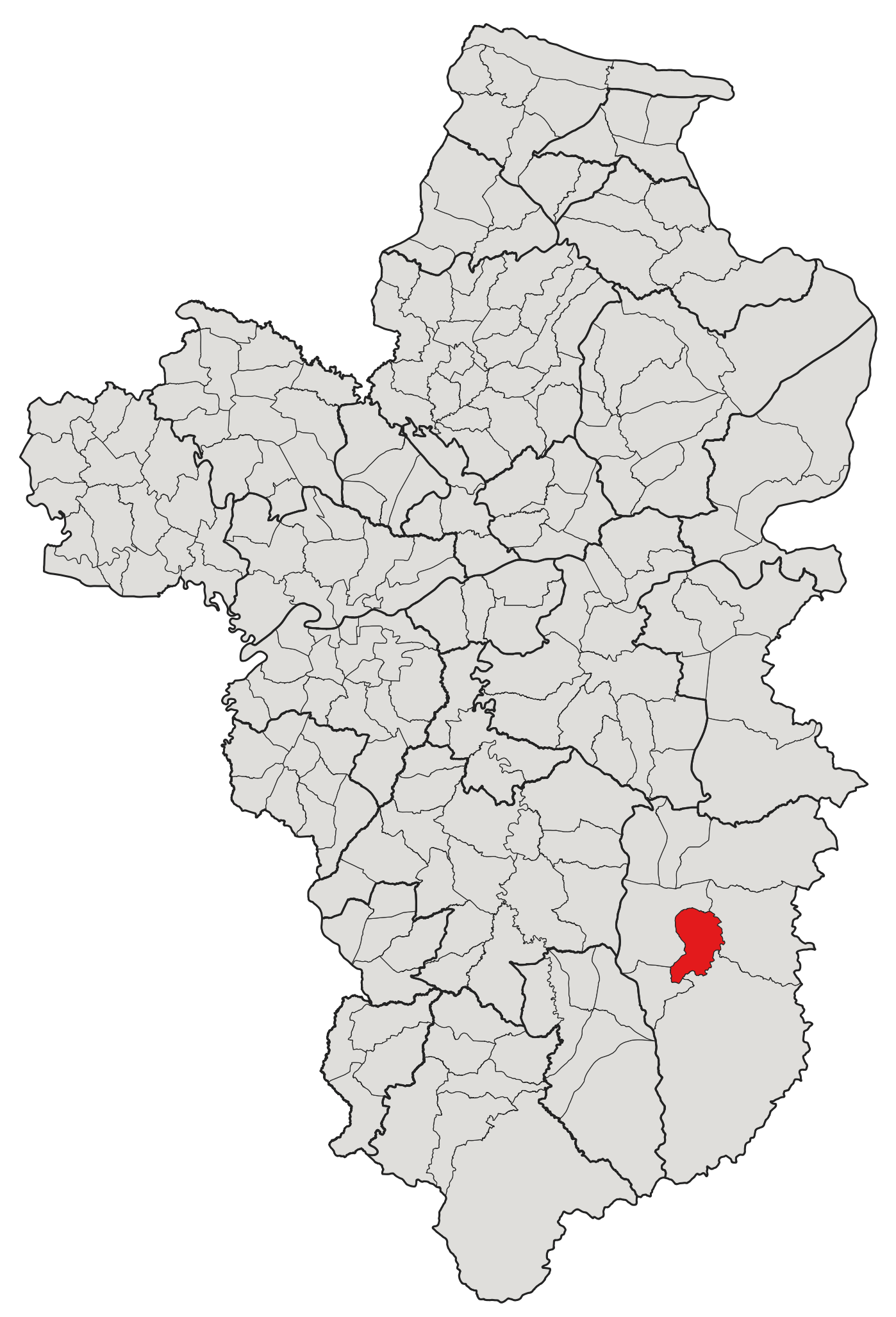
- Subdistrict location in Ubon Ratchathani province
- Country: Thailand
- Province: Ubon Ratchathani
- District: Buntharik
- Number of Muban: 12
- Number of Mu: 15
- Subdistrict established: 1985

Area
  - Total: 59.40 km^{2} (22.93 sq mi)

Population (2021)
  - Total: 10,374
  - Density: 174.65/km^{2} (452.3/sq mi)
- Time zone: UTC+7 (ICT)
- Postal code: 34230

Bua Ngam (Thai: บัวงาม) is a tambon (subdistrict) located in the central region of Buntharik district, in Ubon Ratchathani Province, Thailand. In 2021, it had a population of 10,374 people. Neighbouring subdistricts are (clockwise from the south) Huai Kha, Non Kho, Nong Sano, and Phon Ngam.

== History ==
The area was first settled by several groups of villagers evacuated from Sisaket, Amnat Charoen, Det Udom, and Phibun Mangsahan, but the exact timing is unknown. It was also one of the battlefields between the Government of Thailand and the Communist Party of Thailand in a guerrilla war lasting from 1965 until 1983.

The subdistrict of Bua Ngam was founded in 1985 by splitting off seven villages in the western area of the Phon Ngam subdistrict.

== Geography ==
The tambon is located in the central region of the Buntharik district, on the low river plains of the Lam Dom Noi River (ลำโดมน้อย).

== Administration ==
The subdistrict of Bua Ngam is divided into 12 administrative villages (mubans; หมู่บ้าน), three of which, Non Bak, Udon Chroen, and Taksin Pattana, were further divided into two community groups (Mu; หมู่). The area is shared by 2 local governments; the township area on the west bank of the Lam Dom Noi was administrated by the Buntharik Subdistrict Municipality (เทศบาลตำบลบุณฑริก), which also covered some area of the neighboring subdistrict, Phon Ngam, while the remaining, approximately 44 km^{2}, was covered by the Subdistrict Administrative Organization of Bua Ngam (องค์การบริหารส่วนตำบลบัวงาม; Bua Ngam SAO).

As of the 2021 census, it had a population of 10,374 people with 3,923 households. The following is a list of the subdistrict's mubans, which roughly correspond to the villages.

Village		Group (Mu)	Local government				Total	
Village		Group (Mu)	Buntharik Township		Bua Ngam SAO		Total	
Romanized name	Thai name	Group (Mu)	Household	Population	Household	Population	Household	Population
Bua Ngam	บัวงาม	1	333	444	10	26	343	470
Non Sawan	โนนสวรรค์	2	423	1,094	202	293	625	1,387
Sang Tho	สร้างถ่อ	3	0	0	115	375	115	375
Hua Khae	หัวแข้	4	0	0	381	1,181	381	1,181
Non Bak	โนนบาก	5	0	0	215	717	215	717
Non Bak	โนนบาก	15	0	0	216	612	216	612
Udon Chroen	อุดรเจริญ	6	0	0	188	445	188	445
Udon Chroen	อุดรเจริญ	13	0	0	217	774	217	774
Huay Po	ห้วยปอ	7	0	0	200	583	200	583
Buntharik	บุณฑริก	8	308	532	0	0	308	532
Si Samut	ศรีสมุทร	9	0	0	192	555	192	222
Non Tha Chang	โนนท่าช้าง	10	155	425	114	332	269	757
Taksin Pattana	ทักษิณพัฒนา	11	0	0	194	432	194	432
Taksin Pattana	ทักษิณพัฒนา	14	0	0	188	637	188	637
Huay Po Charoen	ห้วยปอเจริญ	12	0	0	272	917	272	917
Central House Registration			0	0	0	0	0	0
Total			1,219	2,495	2,704	7,879	3,923	10,374
