= Nong Sano, Buntharik =

Coordinates: 14.808616°N 105.298920°E

Nong Sano หนองสะโน
- Subdistrict
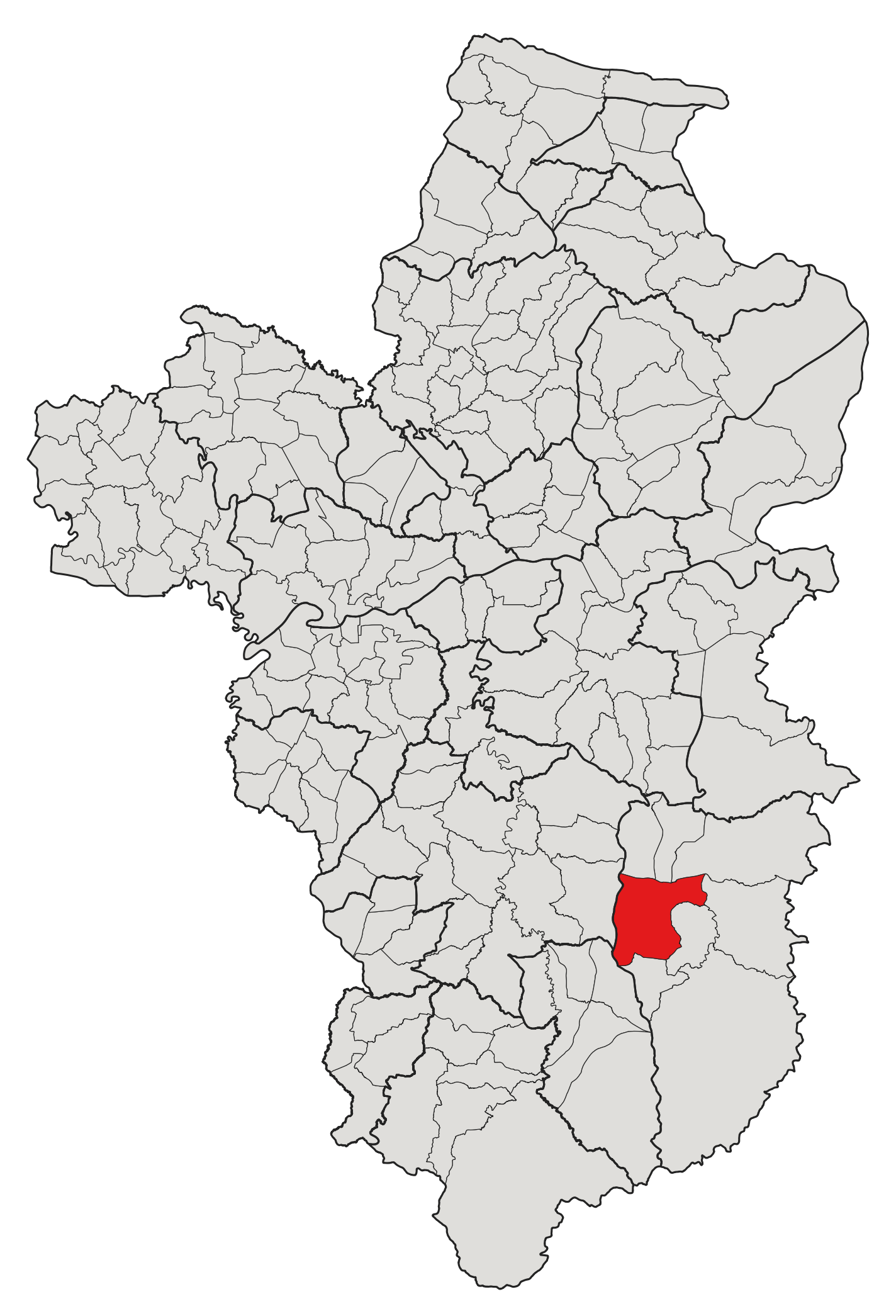
- Subdistrict location in Ubon Ratchathani province
- Country: Thailand
- Province: Ubon Ratchathani
- District: Buntharik
- Number of Muban: 20
- Number of Mu: 23
- Subdistrict established: 1969

Area
  - Total: 145 km^{2} (56 sq mi)

Population (2021)
  - Total: 16,973
  - Density: 117.06/km^{2} (303.2/sq mi)
- Time zone: UTC+7 (ICT)
- Postal code: 34230

Nong Sano (Thai: หนองสะโน) is a tambon (subdistrict) located in the western region of Buntharik district, in Ubon Ratchathani Province, Thailand. In 2021, it had a population of 16,973 people. Neighbouring subdistricts are (clockwise from the south) Non Kho, Sok Saeng, Bua Ngam of Det Udom district, Na Pho, Ban Maet, Kho Laen, Phon Ngam and Bua Ngam of Buntharik.

== History ==
The subdistrict of Nong Sano was founded in 1969 by splitting off 11 villages in the westernmost area of the Phon Ngam subdistrict.

== Geography ==
The tambon covers 145 km^{2} and is located in the western region of the Buntharik district. The western part features undulating terrain, while the remainder is primarily low river plains of the Lam Dom Noi River. (ลำโดมน้อย).

== Administration ==
The subdistrict of Nong Sano is divided into 20 villages (mubans; หมู่บ้าน), two of which, Nong Sano and Non Laing villages, were further divided into three and two community groups (Mu; หมู่), respectively. The entire area has been governed by the Subdistrict Administrative Organization of Nong Sano (องค์การบริหารส่วนตำบลหนองสะโน; Nong Sano SAO).

As of the 2021 census, it had a population of 16,973 people with 5,195 households. The following is a list of the subdistrict's mubans, which roughly correspond to the villages.

Village		Group (Mu)	Household	Population
Romanized name	Thai name	Group (Mu)	Household	Population
Nong Sano	หนองสะโน	1	296	871
Nong Sano	หนองสะโน	15	174	614
Nong Sano	หนองสะโน	19	226	803
Nong Muang	หนองม่วง	2	205	586
Non Chan	โนนจันทร์	3	213	623
Non Laing	โนนเลียง	4	290	870
Non Laing	โนนเลียง	16	208	648
Non Chik	โนนจิก	5	175	676
Sang Muang	สร้างม่วง	6	249	824
Som Siaw	ส้มเสี้ยว	7	212	584
Na Dom	นาโดม	8	212	727
Udom Chat	อุดมชาติ	9	334	1,048
Somphon Rat	สมพรรัตน์	10	179	626
Jong Charoen	จงเจริญ	11	419	1,300
Pho Ngoen	โพธิ์เงิน	12	307	1,161
That Nang Phaya	ธาตุนางพญา	13	211	581
Krung Charoen	กรุงเจริญ	14	132	304
Muang Charoen	ม่วงเจริญ	17	232	847
Non Saen Suk	โนนแสนสุข	18	121	461
Muang Ngam	ม่วงงาม	20	242	847
Nong Muang Tai	หนองม่วงใต้	21	165	512
Vieng Kasem	เวียงเกษม	22	245	824
Somphon Rat Tai	สมพรรัตน์ใต้	23	148	636
Central House Registration			0	0
Total			5,195	16,973
