= Kham Khrang =

Coordinates: 14.878773°N 105.201086°E

Kham Khrang คำครั่ง
- Subdistrict
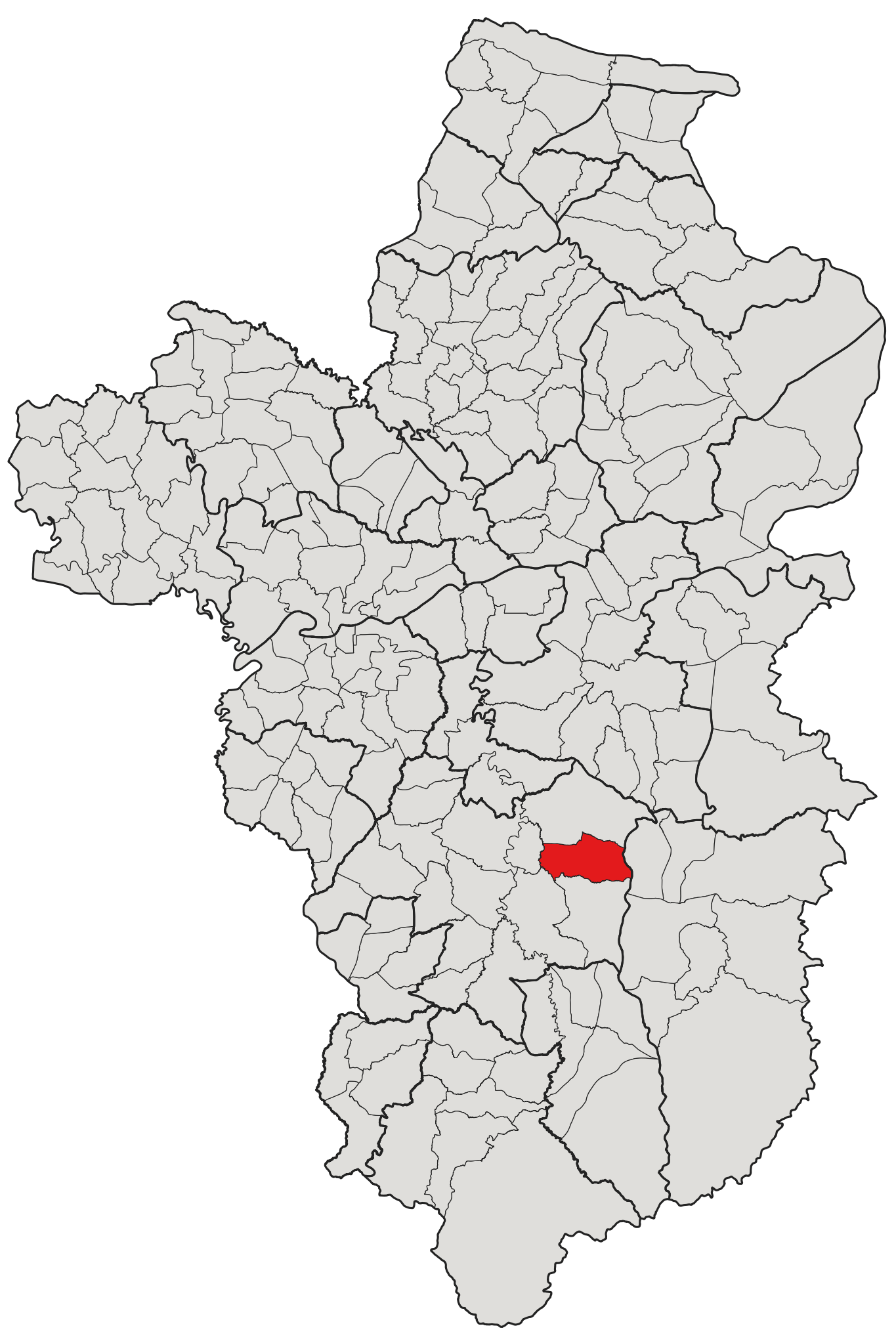
- Subdistrict location in Ubon Ratchathani province
- Country: Thailand
- Province: Ubon Ratchathani
- District: Det Udom
- Mubans: 7
- Mu: 10
- Subdistrict established: 1980

Area
  - Total: 46 km^{2} (18 sq mi)

Population (2021)
  - Total: 6,731
  - Density: 146.32/km^{2} (379.0/sq mi)
- Time zone: UTC+7 (ICT)
- Postal code: 34160

Kham Khrang (Thai: คำครั่ง) is a tambon (subdistrict) of Det Udom District, in Ubon Ratchathani Province, Thailand. In 2021, it had a population of 6,731 people. Neighbouring subdistricts are (clockwise from the south) Bua Ngam, Klang, Phon Ngam, Kut Prathai, and Na Pho.

== History ==
Kham Khrang legally gained village status in 1935 with Aon Boonma (Thai: อ่อน บุญมา) as the first village headman. It was first administered from Kut Prathai and later became a subdistrict in its own right in 1980.

== Administration ==
The tambon is divided into eight administrative villages (mubans; หมู่บ้าน) which are further divided into ten community groups (Mu; หมู่). All of which were governed by the Subdistrict Administrative Organization of Kham Khrang (องค์การบริหารส่วนตำบลคำครั่ง).

The following is a list of the subdistrict's mubans, which roughly correspond to the villages:

Village		Group (Mu)	Household (as of 2021)	Population (as of 2021)
Romanized name	Thai name	Group (Mu)	Household (as of 2021)	Population (as of 2021)
Kham Khrang	คำครั่ง	1	340	1,041
Kham Khrang	คำครั่ง	2	361	787
Kham Khrang	คำครั่ง	7	369	1,262
Non Sawang	โนนสว่าง	3	144	428
Na Nuan	นานวล	4	287	556
Na Somboon	นาสมบูรณ์	5	345	707
Na Pradoo	นาประดู่	6	318	443
Burapa	บูรพา	8	124	377
Na Nuan Tai Pattana	นานวลใต้พัฒนา	9	437	731
Don Chi	ดอนชี	10	132	369
Total			2,857	6,731

== Headman ==
The following is a list of the subdistrict's headman (Kamnan) since its establishment in 1980.

Subdistrict Headman		Term of Office
Romanized name	Thai name	Term of Office
Sorn Setra	สอน เสตรา	1956–1983 (27 years)
Rean Homhuan	เรียน หอมหวน	1983–1992 (9 years)
Somchit Promchan	สมชิต พรมจันทร์	1992–2005 (13 years)
Somkit Seeda	สมคิด สีดา	2005–2008 (3 years)
Chada Duangthong	ชฎา ดวงทอง	2008–Present (18 years)
