= Kut Prathai =

Coordinates: 14.959094°N 105.175818°E

Kut Prathai กุดประทาย
- Subdistrict
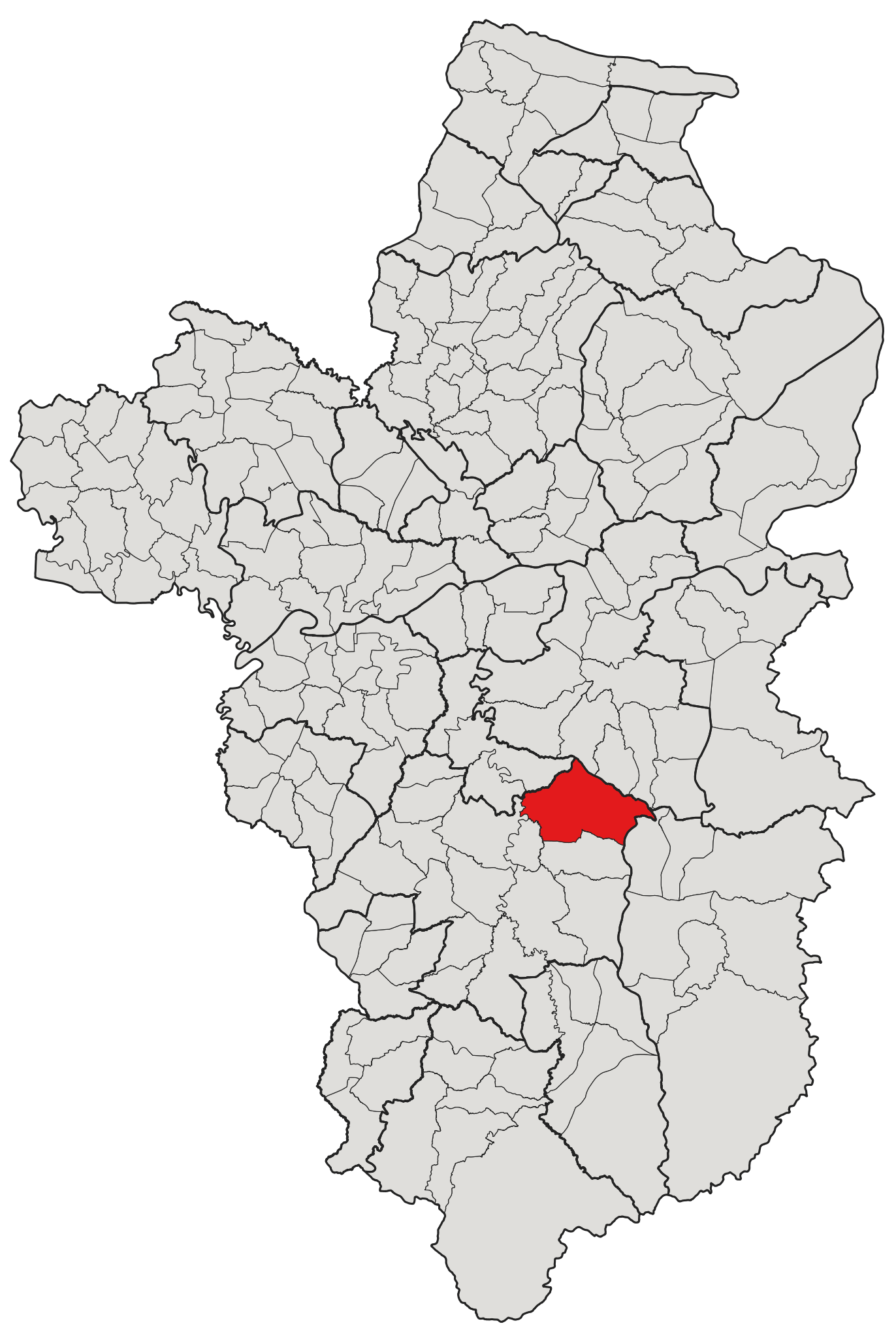
- Subdistrict location in Ubon Ratchathani province
- Country: Thailand
- Province: Ubon Ratchathani
- District: Det Udom
- Mubans: 19
- Mu: 21
- Subdistrict established: 1947

Area
  - Total: 151.776 km^{2} (58.601 sq mi)

Population (2021)
  - Total: 13,687
  - Density: 90.18/km^{2} (233.6/sq mi)
- Time zone: UTC+7 (ICT)
- Postal code: 34160

Kut Prathai (Thai: กุดประทาย) is a tambon (subdistrict) of Det Udom District, in Ubon Ratchathani Province, Thailand. In 2021, it had a population of 13,687 people. Neighbouring subdistricts are (clockwise from the south) Kham Khrang, Phon Ngam, Mueang Det, Na Rueang, Na Yia, Nong Bua Hi, Ban Khaem, Ang Sila and Na Pho.

== History ==
Kut Prathai legally gained subdistrict status in 1947. Previously, it was administered by the district's capital, Mueang Det. In 1980, the southern region of the tambon was split off to establish a new tambon, Kham Khrang.

== Geography ==
The tambon is located in the northeastern region of Det Udom district, which is the river plain of the Lam Dom Yai river (ลำโดมใหญ่).

== Administration ==
The tambon is divided into nineteen administrative villages (mubans; หมู่บ้าน) which are further divided into twenty-one community groups (Mu; หมู่). All of which were governed by the Kut Prathai subdistrict municipality (เทศบาลตำบลกุดประทาย).

The following is a list of the subdistrict's mubans, which roughly correspond to the villages:

Village		Group (Mu)	Household (as of 2021)	Population (as of 2021)
Romanized name	Thai name	Group (Mu)	Household (as of 2021)	Population (as of 2021)
Non Kham	โนนขาม	1	221	684
Don Muay	ดอนม่วย	2	163	391
Na Thung	นาทุ่ง	3	291	679
Na Thung	นาทุ่ง	21	117	350
Non Koy	โนนกอย	4	299	880
Kut Prathai	กุดประทาย	5	336	586
Nong Khu	หนองคู	6	303	813
Non Kheng	โนนเค็ง	7	225	690
Sook Somboon	สุขสมบูรณ์	8	335	940
Kham Naseang	คำนาแซง	9	429	1,195
Non Bok	โนนบก	10	176	500
Saen Sook	แสนสุข	11	258	634
Saen Sook	แสนสุข	20	258	702
Udom Sook	อุดมสุข	12	277	559
Hlao	เหล่า	13	276	685
Nong Waeng	หนองแวง	14	104	404
Kut Charoen	กุดเจริญ	15	357	752
Non Charoen	โนนเจริญ	16	219	802
Seam Chacoen	เสียมเจริญ	17	123	375
Thung Saeng Tawan	ทุ่งแสงตะวัน	18	155	484
Kham Na Saeng	คำนาแซง	19	193	506
Central house Registration			1	76
Total			5,116	13,687
