= Phon Ngam, Det Udom =

Coordinates: 14.896438°N 105.129105°E

Phon Ngam โพนงาม
- Subdistrict
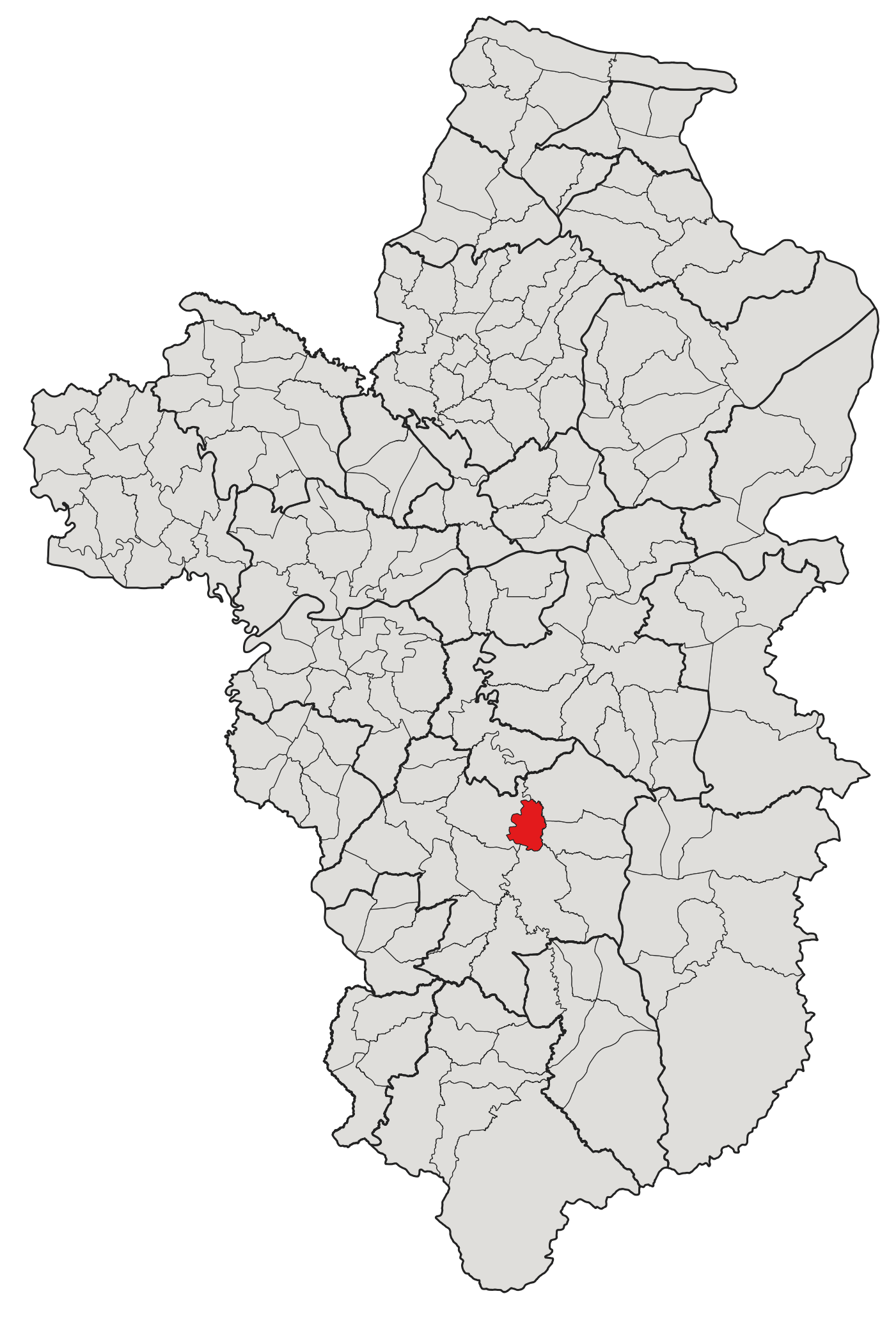
- Subdistrict location in Ubon Ratchathani province
- Country: Thailand
- Province: Ubon Ratchathani
- District: Det Udom
- Mubans: 8
- Number of Mu: 13
- Subdistrict established: 1986

Area
  - Total: 36 km^{2} (14 sq mi)

Population (2021)
  - Total: 9,117
  - Density: 253.25/km^{2} (655.9/sq mi)
- Time zone: UTC+7 (ICT)
- Postal code: 34160

Phon Ngam (Thai: โพนงาม) is a tambon (subdistrict) of Det Udom District, in Ubon Ratchathani Province, Thailand. In 2021, it had a population of 9,117 people. Neighbouring subdistricts are (clockwise from the south) Klang, Mueang Det, Kut Prathai, and Kham Khrang.

== History ==
The region was first settled in 1906 by a group of 30 households led by Butprom Santa (บุตรพรม สันตะ); the first village was named "Nong Yaow" (หนองยาว; Long Pond), after the title of the pond nearby, and was followed by the second and third waves of the settlement in the 1940s.

The tambon was created in 1986 by separating the district's capital, Mueang Det, into two halves, the eastern of which was named Phon Ngam subdistrict. While the Phon Ngam subdistrict is much older, the Tambon administrative organization (TAO) as the local administration unit was established in 1996. Effective October 27, 2009, it was upgraded to a subdistrict municipality.

== Geography ==
The tambon was located in the central region of the Det Udom district, which is the low river plain of the Lam Dom Yai river, and covered 36 kilometers squares.

== Administration ==
The tambon is divided into eight administrative villages (mubans; หมู่บ้าน) which are further divided into thirteen community groups (Mu; หมู่). All of which were governed by the Phon Ngam subdistrict municipality (เทศบาลตำบลโพนงาม).

The following is a list of the subdistrict's mubans, which roughly correspond to the villages:

Village		Group (Mu)	Household (as of 2021)	Population (as of 2021)
Romanized name	Thai name	Group (Mu)	Household (as of 2021)	Population (as of 2021)
Phon Ngam	โพนงาม	1	244	684
Phon Ngam	โพนงาม	13	183	389
Nong Yaow	หนองยาว	2	269	954
Nong Yaow	หนองยาว	9	345	780
Nong Yaow	หนองยาว	10	238	619
Nong Yaow	หนองยาว	12	242	930
Non Sawang	โนนสว่าง	3	252	628
Non Sawang	โนนสว่าง	11	175	646
Udom Pattana	อุดมพัฒนา	4	243	605
Pang 2	ผัง 2	5	207	584
Non Nongkha	โนนหนองค้า	6	165	418
Kham Somboon	คำสมบูรณ์	7	226	596
Rat Pattana	ราษฎร์พัฒนา	8	437	1,284
Total			3,226	9,117
