= Kho Laen =

Coordinates: 14.872209°N 105.417809°E

Kho Laen คอแลน
- Subdistrict
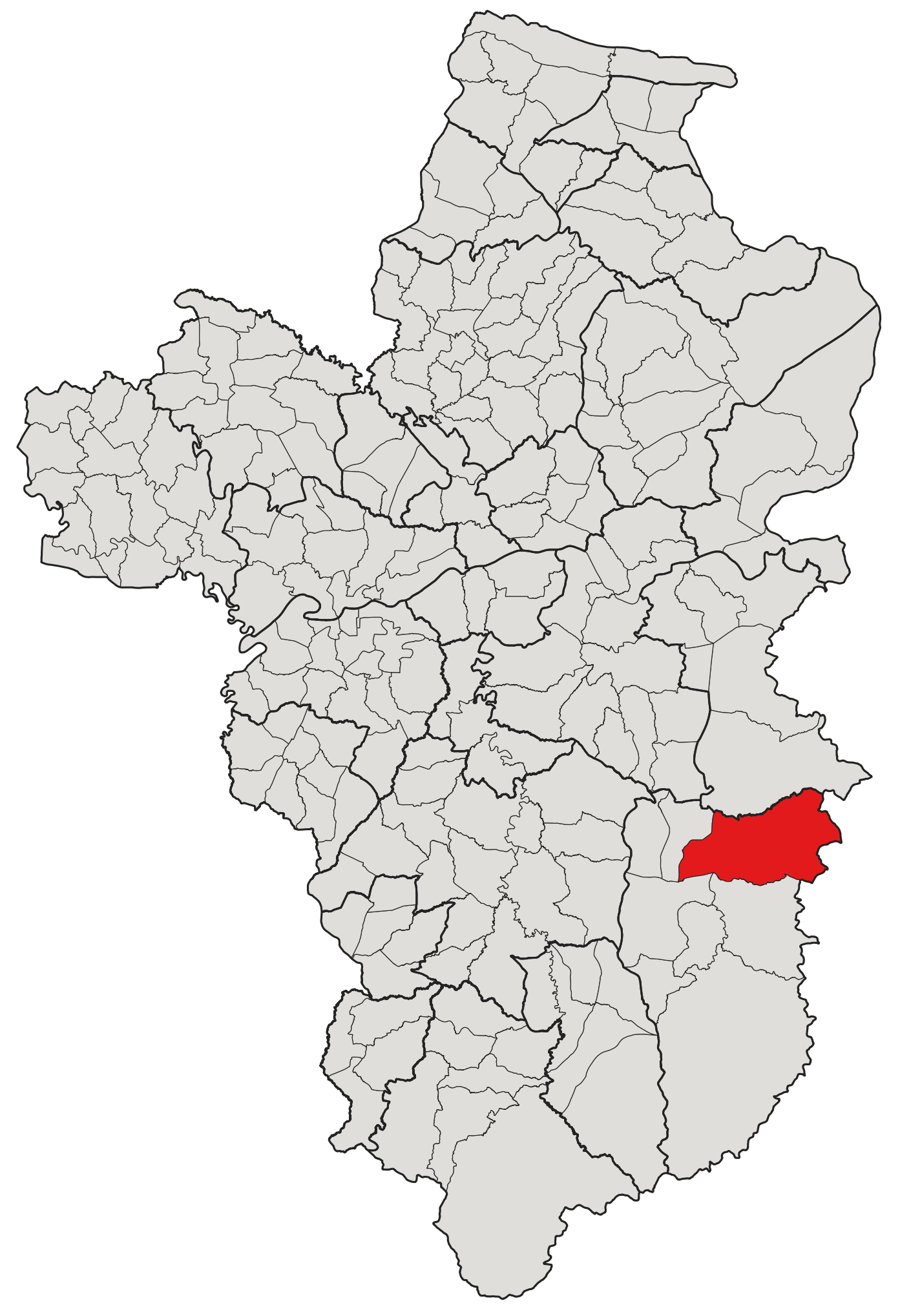
- Subdistrict location in Ubon Ratchathani province
- Country: Thailand
- Province: Ubon Ratchathani
- District: Buntharik
- Number of Muban: 15
- Number of Mu: 18
- Subdistrict established: Before 1912

Area
  - Total: 244.54 km^{2} (94.42 sq mi)

Population (2021)
  - Total: 13,260
  - Density: 54.22/km^{2} (140.4/sq mi)
- Time zone: UTC+7 (ICT)
- Postal code: 34230

Kho Laen (Thai: คอแลน) is a tambon (subdistrict) located in the northeastern region of Buntharik district, in Ubon Ratchathani Province, Thailand. In 2021, it had a population of 13,260 people. Neighbouring subdistricts are (clockwise from the south) Phon Ngam, Nong Sano, Ban Maet, and Non Ko, as well as the Champassack district of Laos in the east.

== History ==
The area was first settled in 1792 by a group of villagers evacuated from Pi Ler village (บ้านปิเหร่อ) in Sisaket province; the first settlement was called "Khua Mi" (ขัวหมี), located on the west bank of the Lam Dom Noi River, which is Nong Bua village in the present day. Due to the outbreak, the original settlers resettled 4 kilometers eastwards to a new location, Kho Laen village, on the east side of the river. A new village was named after a tropical fruit tree known as "Korlan" (Nephelium hypoleucum), which was found numerously in the area.

Kho Laen was one of the three oldest subdistricts (tambon) of the Buntharik district, together with Phon Ngam and Huai Kha. In 1973, the tambon's half-western area became an independent subdistrict, Na Pho, by absorbing seven other villages in the surrounding area. The newly established subdistrict was also separated in 1987 to create the Ban Maet subdistrict.

In the early era, the tambon was governed by the Subdistrict Council of Kho Laen until it was promoted to the Subdistrict Administrative Organization (SAO) in 1997, and to the subdistrict municipality in 2008.

== Geography ==
The tambon covers 244.54 km^{2} and is located in the northeastern region of the Buntharik district. The eastern part has undulating terrain and the highland of the Dângrêk Mountains, which form the border between Thailand and Laos, while the western is a lowland alternating with some parts of the upland and some are the Lam Dom Noi river basins.

== Administration ==
The subdistrict of Kho Laen is divided into 15 villages (mubans; หมู่บ้าน), three of which, Kho Laen, Domg Moei, and Nong Bua, each was further divided into two community groups (Mu; หมู่), Since 2008, the Kho Laen Subdistrict Municipality (เทศบาลตำบลคอแลน; Kho Laen Township) has been the local government responding to administer the area.

As of the 2021 census, it had a population of 13,260 people with 4,113 households. The following is a list of the subdistrict's mubans, which roughly correspond to the villages.

Village		Group (Mu)	Household	Population
Romanized name	Thai name	Group (Mu)	Household	Population
Kho Laen	คอแลน	1	263	775
Kho Laen	คอแลน	18	132	463
Pa Khaem	ป่าแขม	2	263	775
Dong Moei	ดงเมย	3	231	839
Dong Moei	ดงเมย	15	121	539
Huay Sai	ห้วยทราย	4	294	1,113
Nong Bua	หนองบัว	5	234	824
Nong Bua	หนองบัว	16	97	379
Kaeng Yang	แก้งยาง	6	201	645
Nong Kob	หนองกบ	7	267	675
Nong Ruea	หนองเรือ	8	385	698
Khon Paen	ขอนแป้น	9	225	829
Non Samran	โนนสำราญ	10	323	1,138
Sai Thong	ทรายทอง	11	200	707
Saeng Udom	แสงอุดม	12	210	615
Sila Chai	ศิลาชัย	13	208	780
Charoen Chai	เจริญชัย	14	313	872
Kham Sombun	คำสมบูรณ์	17	168	592
Central House Registration			1	10
Total			4,113	13,260
