= Ban Maet =

Coordinates: 14.853974°N 105.322132°E

Ban Maet บ้านแมด
- Subdistrict
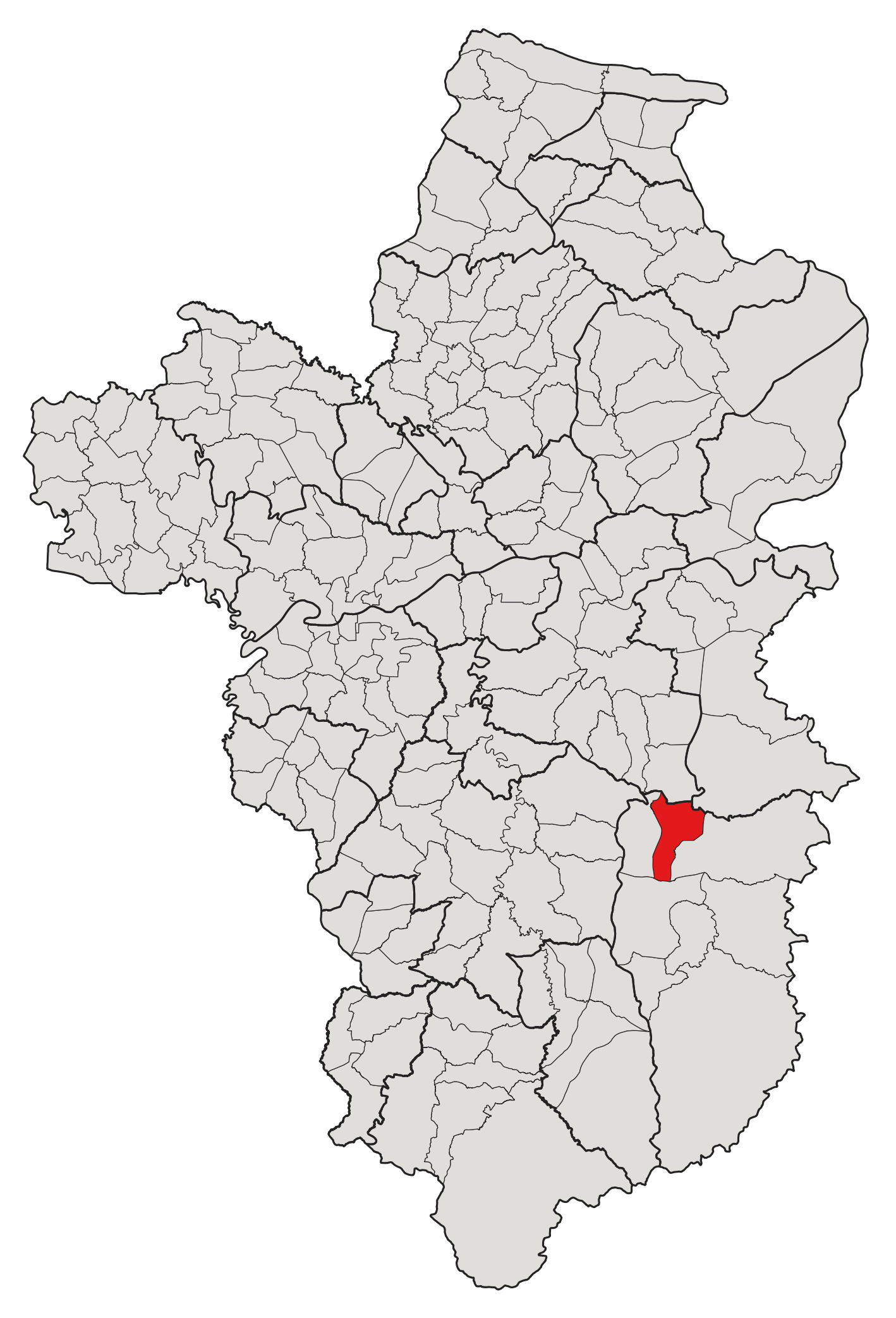
- Subdistrict location in Ubon Ratchathani province
- Country: Thailand
- Province: Ubon Ratchathani
- District: Buntharik
- Number of Muban: 12
- Number of Mu: 12
- Subdistrict established: 1987

Area
  - Total: 96 km^{2} (37 sq mi)

Population (2021)
  - Total: 8,542
  - Density: 88.98/km^{2} (230.5/sq mi)
- Time zone: UTC+7 (ICT)
- Postal code: 34230

Ban Maet (Thai: บ้านแมด) is a tambon (subdistrict) located in the northwestern region of Buntharik district, in Ubon Ratchathani Province, Thailand. In 2021, it had a population of 8,542 people. Neighbouring subdistricts are (clockwise from the south) Nong Sano, Na Pho, Non Kalong, Non Ko, and Kho Laen.

== History ==
Previously, Ban Maet was a small village located on the left bank of Huay Dod Creek (ห้วยโดด), one of the tributaries of the Lam Dom Noi River, and was governed by Kho Laen. Later in 1973, it was separated from Kho Laen to form a new subdivision, Na Pho, with seven other villages.

Due to deforestation, the steam levels of the four water creeks in the area, including Huay Dod, Huay Thalaeng, Huay Thaen, and Huay Kham, were drastically decreased. As a result, people began to conquer the formerly flooded land and establish more communities, including the Ban Maet village, which increased in population and eventually gained subdistrict status in 1987 by absorbing six other settlements in the Na Pho subdistrict's eastern half.

After its establishment, tambon (subdistrict) Ban Maet was governed by the subdistrict council, which was later promoted to the Subdistrict Administrative Organization (SAO) in 1996.

== Geography ==
The tambon covers 96 km^{2} and is located in the northwestern region of the Buntharik district, on the Lam Dom Noi river basins.

== Administration ==
The subdistrict of Ban Maet is divided into 12 villages (mubans; หมู่บ้าน). As of the 2021 census, it had a population of 8,542 people with 2,479 households.

Since 1996, the Subdistrict Administrative Organization of Ban Maet (องค์การบริหารส่วนตำบลบ้านแมด; Ban Maet SAO) has been the local government responding to administer the area.

The following is a list of the subdistrict's mubans, which roughly correspond to the villages.

Village		Group (Mu)	Household	Population
Romanized name	Thai name	Group (Mu)	Household	Population
Hat Sai Khun	หาดทรายคูณ	1	168	377
Bok Charoen	บกเจริญ	2	168	612
Na Khaen	นาแคน	3	312	1,003
Maet	แมด	4	276	938
Non Sombun	โนนสมบูรณ์	5	279	941
Nong Kham Yai	หนองขามใหญ่	6	138	471
Non Kalong Noi	โนนกาหลงน้อย	7	97	330
Hat Tai	หาดใต้	8	252	923
Hat Mai Pattana	หาดใหม่พัฒนา	9	263	938
Na Khaen Pattana	นาแคนพัฒนา	10	267	732
Hat Nuea	หาดเหนือ	11	139	595
Don Chod	ดอนโจด	12	120	709
Central House Registration			0	0
Total			2,479	8,542
