= Non Kho, Buntharik =

Coordinates: 14.691147°N 105.303024°E

Non Kho โนนค้อ
- Subdistrict
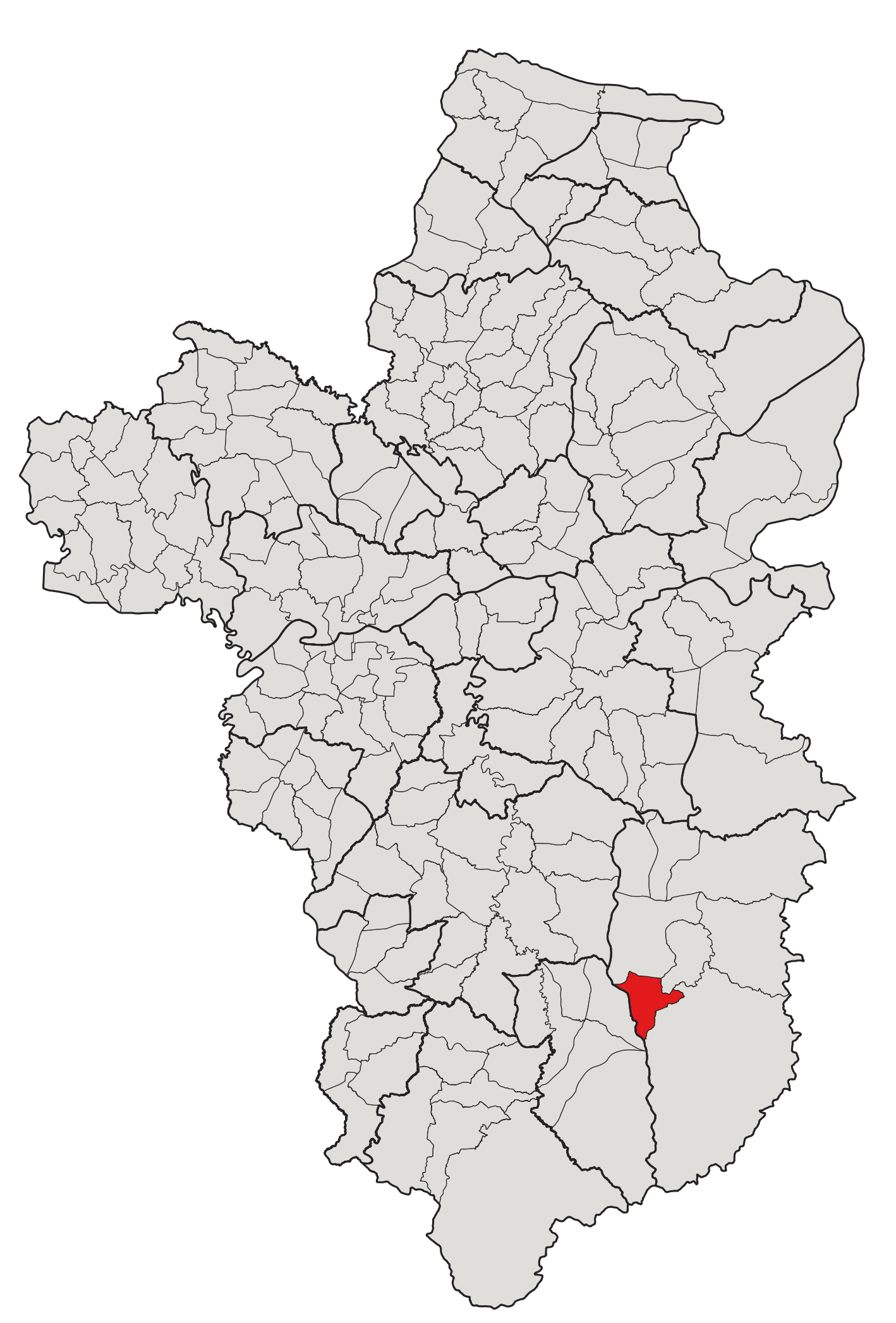
- Subdistrict location in Ubon Ratchathani province
- Country: Thailand
- Province: Ubon Ratchathani
- District: Buntharik
- Number of Muban: 8
- Number of Mu: 11
- Subdistrict established: 1979

Area
  - Total: 62 km^{2} (24 sq mi)

Population (2021)
  - Total: 7,022
  - Density: 113.26/km^{2} (293.3/sq mi)
- Time zone: UTC+7 (ICT)
- Postal code: 34230

Non Kho (Thai: โนนค้อ) is a tambon (subdistrict) located in the western region of Buntharik district, in Ubon Ratchathani Province, Thailand. In 2021, it had a population of 7,022 people. Neighbouring subdistricts are (clockwise from the south) Huai Kha, Sok Saeng, Nong Sano, and Bua Ngam.

== History ==
The area was first colonized in the 1840s, with the first village, Ban Non Kho (บ้านโนนค้อ), created by a group of fifteen Laotian families led by Kundet Rittimat (ขุนเดช ฤทธิมาศ), who emigrated from present-day Laos to resettle in the area. They were followed by another group of immigrants from Ban Huai Lok (บ้านห้วยโลก) in Na Chaluai, led by Chai Damrong (ชัย ดำรงค์), and the final group, from Warin Chamrap, in 1957. The community area gradually expanded as the population grew; some areas later became independent villages, such as Ban Non Suan (บ้านโนนสวน), which was broken off from Ban Non Kho in 1991.

Non Kho became the new subdistrict's capital when a tambon (subdistrict) with the same name was created in 1979 by the separation of six villages in the northwest area of Huai Kha subdistrict. After its establishment, it was governed by its subdistrict council until the council was promoted to the Subdistrict Administrative Organization (SAO) in 1996.

== Geography ==
The tambon covers 62 km^{2} and is located in the western region of the Buntharik district, on the Lam Dom Noi river basins.

== Administration ==
The subdistrict of Non Kho is divided into eight villages (mubans; หมู่บ้าน), two of which, Non Kho and Non Sawang villages, was further divided into two and three community group (หมู่; Mu), respectively. As of the 2021 census, it had a population of 7,022 people with 2,333 households.

Since 1997, the Subdistrict Administrative Organization of Non Kho (องค์การบริหารส่วนตำบลโนนค้อ, Non Kho SAO) has been the local government responding to administer the area.

The following is a list of the subdistrict's mubans, which roughly correspond to the villages.

Village		Group (Mu)	Household	Population
Romanized name	Thai name	Group (Mu)	Household	Population
Non Kho	โนนค้อ	1	197	506
Non Kho	โนนค้อ	11	171	547
Non Mak Dueay	โนนหมากเดือย	2	296	936
Non Swang	โนนสว่าง	3	204	503
Non Swang	โนนสว่าง	9	166	577
Non Swang	โนนสว่าง	10	236	718
Nong Sila	หนองศิลา	4	179	610
Non Kham Dun	โนนคำดูล	5	122	421
Nong Yu	หนองยู	6	131	340
Nong Mek	หนองเม็ก	7	365	1,029
Non Suan	โนนสวน	8	266	835
Central House Registration			0	0
Total			2,333	7,022
