= Buntharik district =

Buntharik บุณฑริก
- District
- District location in Ubon Ratchathani province
- Coordinates: 14°45′24″N 105°24′41″E
- Country: Thailand
- Province: Ubon Ratchathani
- Seat: Phon Ngam

Area
  - Total: 1,402.0 km^{2} (541.3 sq mi)

Population (2005)
  - Total: 88,052
  - Density: 62.8/km^{2} (163/sq mi)
- Time zone: UTC+7 (ICT)
- Postal code: 34230
- Geocode: 3410

Buntharik (Thai: บุณฑริก, pronounced [būn.tʰā.rík]; Northeastern Thai: บุณฑริก, pronounced [būn.tʰā.lìk]) is a district (amphoe) in the southeastern part of Ubon Ratchathani province, northeastern Thailand.

== History ==
King Nak of Champasak proposed that King Mongkut (Rama IV) establish Mueang Bua, which is now in the area of Ban Kong Krachu, Tambon Phon Sawan, Na Chaluai district. Later Phra Aphai (พระอภัย), the governor moved the town center to Ban Huai Po. In 1859 the next governor, Luang Buntharik Khettanurak (Sai) moved the town center to Ban Non Sung but keep the name Mueang Bua. The government made Buntharik a minor district (king amphoe) in 1923, and moved the town center to Ban Phon Ngam, on the east bank of the Dom Noi River. The district was subsequently named Phon Ngam. In 1939 it was renamed Buntharik. It was upgraded to a full district on 22 July 1958.

== Geography ==
Neighboring districts are (from the west clockwise) Na Chaluai, Det Udom, Phibun Mangsahan, Sirindhorn and the Laotian province of Champasak.

The important water resource is the Dom Noi River.

== Administration ==
The district is divided into eight sub-districts (tambons), which are further subdivided into 108 villages (mubans). Bua Ngam is a township (thesaban tambon) which covers parts of the tambon Bua Ngam. There are a further eight tambon administrative organizations (TAO).

No.	Name	Thai name	Villages	Pop.
1.	Phon Ngam	โพนงาม	13	11,339
2.	Huai Kha	ห้วยข่า	20	15,468
3.	Kho Laen	คอแลน	16	12,031
4.	Na Pho	นาโพธิ์	10	8,617
5.	Nong Sano	หนองสะโน	18	16,552
6.	Non Kho	โนนค้อ	9	6,395
7.	Bua Ngam	บัวงาม	12	9,949
8.	Ban Maet	บ้านแมด	10	7,701

== Economy ==
Ban Sompornrat village in the district has become known for its hand-woven and dyed silk fabrics. Queen Sirikit, on a visit to the village on 16 November 1994, was taken by the excellence of local silks. She included the weavers in her Silapacheep ('artistic profession') project and promoted their crafts. In 2018, the village's Silapacheep Centre's membership has over 500 craftspeople from across Ubon. They produce muk jok dao ('whale silk fabric') sarongs, costing up to 5,000 baht per metre. Members of the group earn more than 20,000 baht per month, far more than the 5,000 baht previously. The project also exports silk cocoons to Japan.
