= Phon Ngam, Buntharik =

Coordinates: 14.758968°N 105.410448°E

Phon Ngam โพนงาม
- Subdistrict
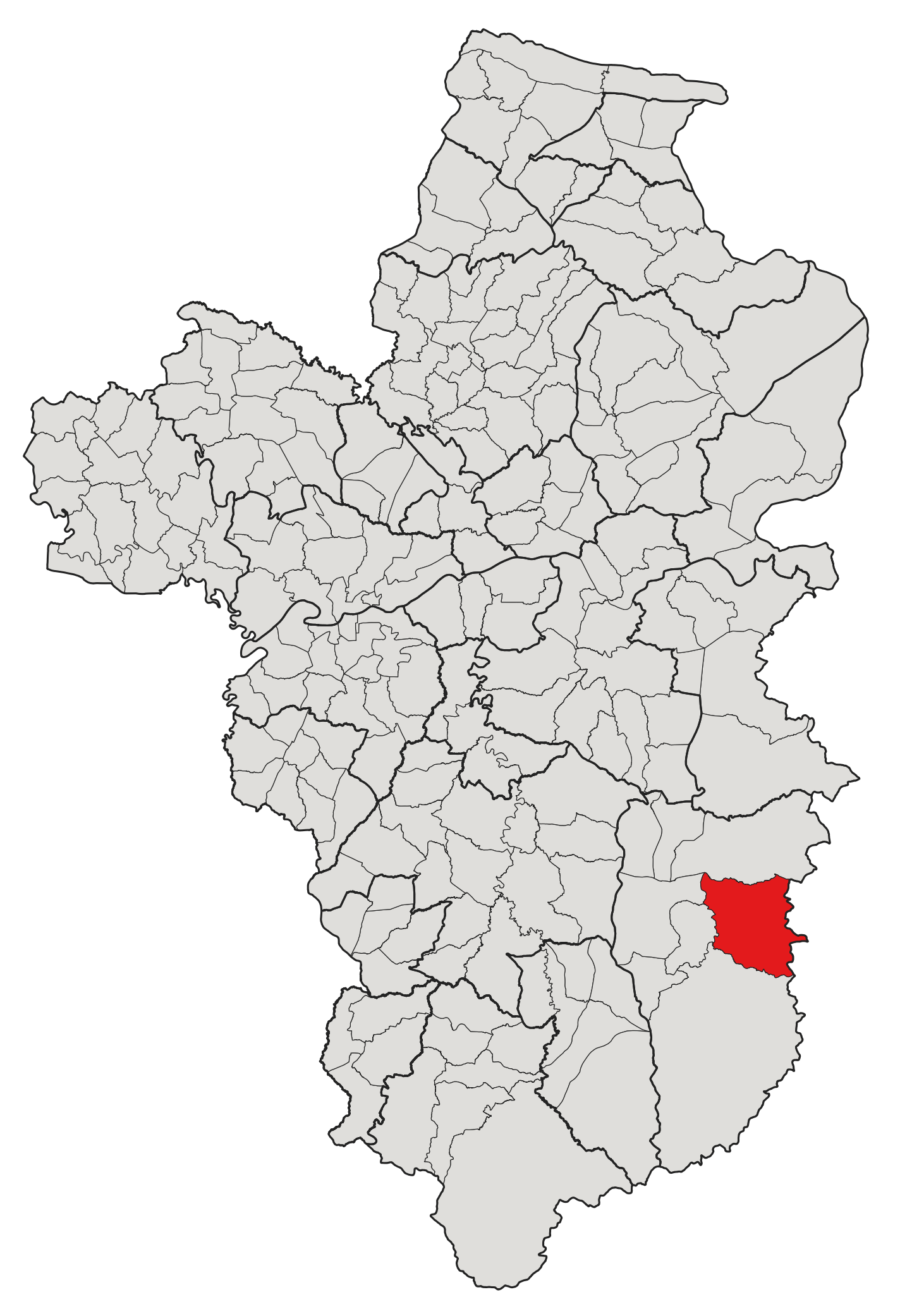
- Subdistrict location in Ubon Ratchathani province
- Country: Thailand
- Province: Ubon Ratchathani
- District: Buntharik
- Number of Muban: 14
- Number of Mu: 14
- Subdistrict established: Before 1912

Area
  - Total: 183 km^{2} (71 sq mi)

Population (2021)
  - Total: 12,757
  - Density: 69.71/km^{2} (180.5/sq mi)
- Time zone: UTC+7 (ICT)
- Postal code: 34230

Phon Ngam (Thai: โพนงาม) is a capital tambon (subdistrict) of Buntharik district, in Ubon Ratchathani Province, Thailand. In 2021, it had a population of 12,757 people. Neighbouring subdistricts are (clockwise from the south) Huai Kha, Bua Ngam, Nong Sano, and Kho Laen, as well as Champassack and Soukhoumma districts of Laos in the east.

== History ==
The area was first settled in the early 1800s, but "Phon Ngam" village gained recognition in 1912 when the central government demoted Buntharik district to a minor district (king amphoe) and relocated the town center from Non Sung village on the west bank of the Lam Dom Noi River to Phon Ngam village on the east. The district was also renamed "Phon Ngam" in 1917. It was then transferred from Khukhan province to Ubon Ratchathani province in 1928, renamed back to the original "Buntharik" in 1939, and later regained its district status in 1958.

Sukhaphiban Buntharik, a local government covering the town center in the Phon Ngam subdistrict, was created in 1956, two years before regaining district status. It was later expanded to cover a larger area in 1983, and upgraded to a subdistrict municipality in May 1999. Meanwhile, the area outside the subdistrict municipality has been governed by the Subdistrict Administrative Organization of Phon Ngam, which was upgraded from the subdistrict's council in 1997.

The westernmost region, consisting of 11 villages, was divided in 1969 to form a new subdistrict, Nong Sano. Later in 1985, seven villages in the western area were additionally separated to form a new administrative division, the Bua Ngam subdistrict.

== Geography ==
The tambon is located in the eastern region of the Buntharik district; the western area is the low river plains of the Lam Dom Noi River (ลำโดมน้อย), while the eastern is highland of Dângrêk Mountains, the border of Thailand and Laos.

== Administration ==
The subdistrict of Phon Ngam is divided into 14 administrative villages (mubans; หมู่บ้าน). The area is shared by 2 local governments; the township area was administrated by the Buntharik Subdistrict Municipality (เทศบาลตำบลบุณฑริก), which also covered some area of the neighboring subdistrict, Bua Ngam, while the remaining was covered by the Subdistrict Administrative Organization of Phon Ngam (องค์การบริหารส่วนตำบลโพนงาม; Phon Ngam SAO).

As of the 2021 census, it had a population of 12,757 people with 4,328 households. The following is a list of the subdistrict's mubans, which roughly correspond to the villages.

Village		Group (Mu)	Local government				Total	
Village		Group (Mu)	Buntharik Township		Phon Ngam SAO		Total	
Romanized name	Thai name	Group (Mu)	Household	Population	Household	Population	Household	Population
Phon Ngam	โพนงาม	1	437	617	3	8	440	625
Non Noi	โนนน้อย	2	0	0	343	993	343	993
Pa Tia	ป่าเตี้ย	3	0	0	280	976	280	976
Non Hung	โนนหุ่ง	4	0	0	290	1,223	290	1,223
Pa Son	ป่าสน	5	0	0	198	652	198	652
Lak Pai	หลักป้าย	6	0	0	417	1,270	417	1,270
Nong Saeng	หนองแสง	7	0	0	498	1,417	498	1,417
Non Sung	โนนสูง	8	0	0	366	1,264	366	1,264
Suan Son	สวนสน	9	153	421	137	249	290	670
Santi Suk	สันติสุข	10	0	0	270	718	270	718
Charoen Pattana	เจริญพัฒนา	11	0	0	301	936	301	936
Phon Suksan	โพนสุขสันต์	12	286	864	9	24	295	888
Kham Udom	คำอุดม	13	0	0	178	633	178	633
Non Thalaeng	โนนแถลง	14	0	0	157	464	157	464
Central House Registration			1	7	4	21	5	28
Total			877	1,909	3,451	10,848	4,328	12,757
