= Huai Kha =

Coordinates: 14.616755°N 105.376398°E

Huai Kha ห้วยข่า
- Subdistrict
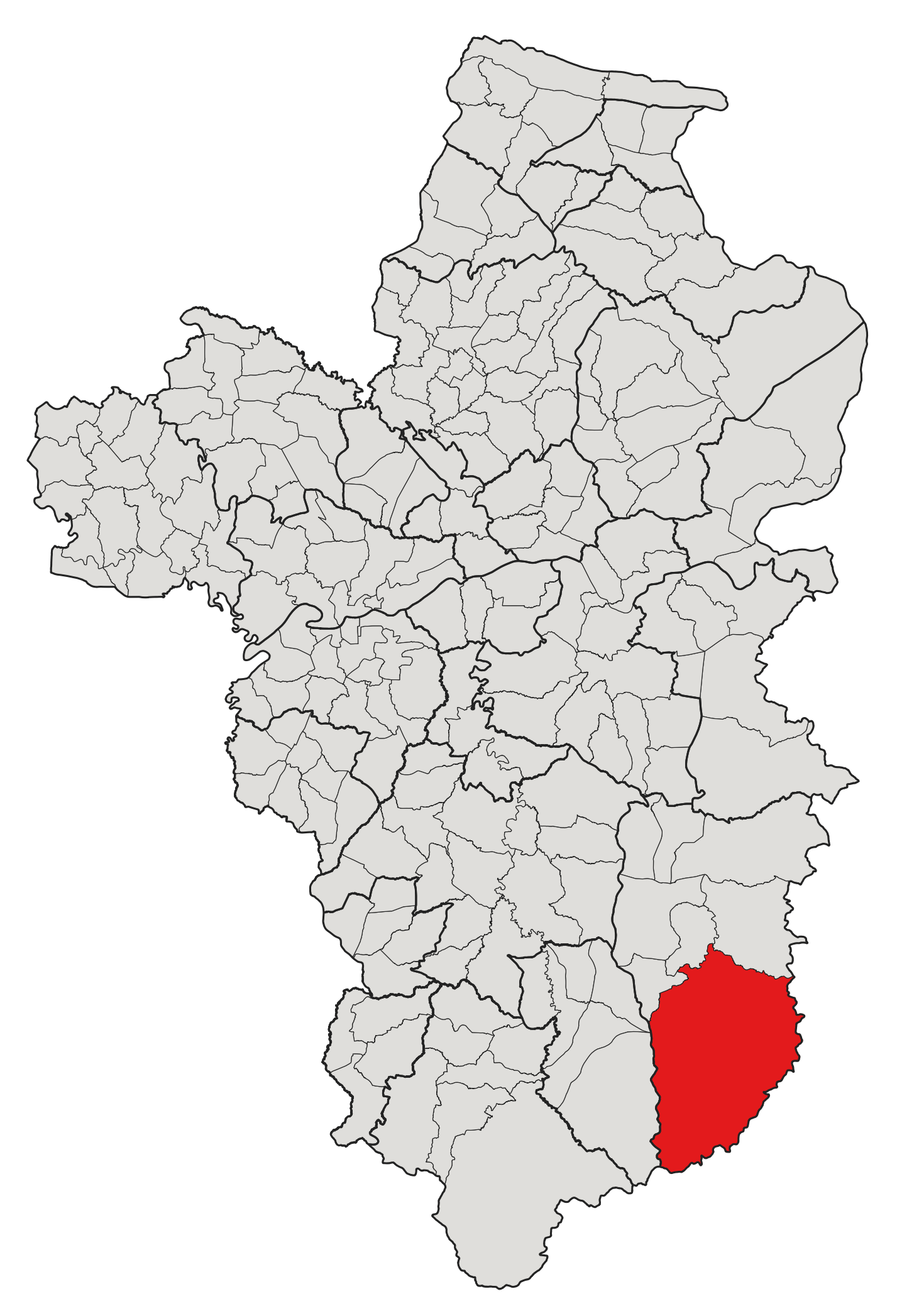
- Subdistrict location in Ubon Ratchathani province
- Country: Thailand
- Province: Ubon Ratchathani
- District: Buntharik
- Number of Muban: 20
- Number of Mu: 23
- Subdistrict established: Before 1912

Area
  - Total: 573 km^{2} (221 sq mi)

Population (2021)
  - Total: 17,799
  - Density: 31.06/km^{2} (80.4/sq mi)
- Time zone: UTC+7 (ICT)
- Postal code: 34230

Huai Kha (Thai: ห้วยข่า) is a tambon (subdistrict) located in the northwestern region of Buntharik district, in Ubon Ratchathani Province, Thailand. In 2021, it had a population of 17,799 people. Neighbouring subdistricts are (clockwise from the west) Na Chaluai, Sok Saeng, Non Kho, and Phon Ngam, as well as Soukhoumma and Mounlapamok districts of Laos in the east and south.

== History ==
Around the early 1800s, several ethnic groups, including Thai, Laotian, and Khmer, as well as an indigenous minority, the Kuy, evacuated from Ban Sang Ngon (บ้านสร้างโหง่น), Ban Pho Dao (บ้านโพเด้า), and Ban Kon Sao Nong Kung (บ้านก้อนเส้าหนองกุง) of Khukhan, currently in Sisaket province, to settle in the area, which was formerly covered with deciduous dipterocarp forest. The first settlement was named "Huai Kha," after Alpinia galanga, which was found numerously in the region, especially in the waterside area; Huai ห้วย means "stream, creek, brook," and Kha ข่า refers to "Alpinia galanga".

Huai Kha was one of the three oldest subdistricts (tambon) of the Buntharik district, together with Phon Ngam and Kho Laen. In 1979, the tambon's village in the northwestern area, Non Kho, became an independent subdistrict with the same name, by absorbing five other villages in the surrounding area.

Initially, Huai Kha subdistrict was governed by its subdistrict council until the council was promoted to the Subdistrict Administrative Organization (SAO) on January 20, 1996.

== Geography ==
The tambon covers 573 km^{2} and is located in the southernmost region of the Buntharik district. The northwest area, one-third of the total, is an undulating plateau where most of its population settled, while the remaining area is a rolling plain and highland of the Dângrêk Mountains, which form the border between Thailand and Laos.

== Administration ==
The subdistrict of Huai Kha is divided into 20 villages (mubans; หมู่บ้าน), three of which, Huai Kha, Nong Mek, and Sang Hom villages, each was further divided into two community group (หมู่; Mu). As of the 2021 census, it had a population of 17,799 people with 5,558 households.

Since 1997, the Subdistrict Administrative Organization of Huai Kha Subdistrict Municipality (องค์การบริหารส่วนตำบลห้วยข่า, Huai Kha SAO) has been the local government responding to administer the area.

The following is a list of the subdistrict's mubans, which roughly correspond to the villages.

Village		Group (Mu)	Household	Population
Romanized name	Thai name	Group (Mu)	Household	Population
Huai Kha	ห้วยข่า	1	315	980
Huai Kha	ห้วยข่า	23	225	848
Nong Paek	หนองแปก	2	273	904
Nong Paen	หนองแปน	3	406	1,018
Nong Mek	หนองเม็ก	4	370	1,110
Nong Mek	หนองเม็ก	21	275	861
Kaeng Swang	แก้งสว่าง	5	212	611
Kham Bak	คำบาก	6	395	1,271
Sang Hom	สร้างหอม	7	237	863
Sang Hom	สร้างหอม	22	235	785
Bok	บก	8	259	711
Kaeng Sombun	แก้งสมบูรณ์	9	356	1,165
Nong Neaw	หนองเหนี่ยว	10	74	228
Pong Yo	โป่งยอ	11	82	276
Kao Klang	เก่ากลาง	12	325	819
Kaeng Udom	แก้งอุดม	13	247	922
Sok Ko	โสกก่อ	14	148	542
Huai Kha Taksin	ห้วยข่าทักษิณ	15	176	572
Non Lamduan	โนนลำดวน	16	228	703
Kham Khunrat	คำขุนราษฎ์	17	170	626
Nong Khaow Pattana	หนองเขว้าพัฒนา	18	136	491
Khaen Thong	แคนทอง	19	247	814
Kham Saensuk	คำแสนสุข	20	168	679
Central House Registration			1	0
Total			5,558	17,799
