= Ang Sila, Phibun Mangsahan =

Subdistrict in Ubon Ratchathani Province

Ang Sila ตำบลอ่างศิลา
- Subdistrict
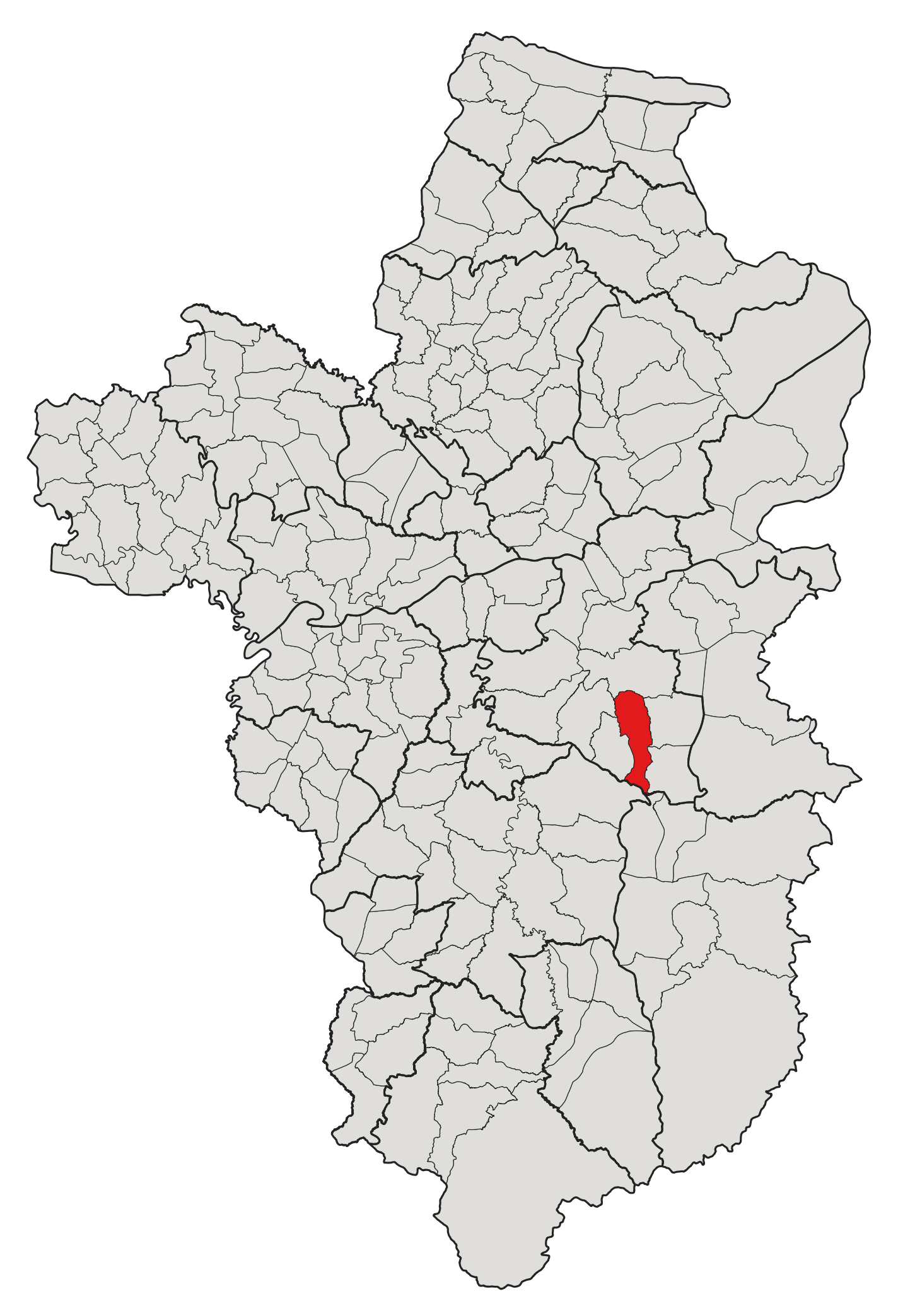
- Subdistrict location in Ubon Ratchathani province
- Country: Thailand
- Province: Ubon Ratchathani
- District: Phibun Mangsahan

Population (2025)
  - Total: 5,408
- Time zone: UTC+7 (ICT)

Ang Sila (Thai: ตำบลอ่างศิลา, pronounced [ʔàːŋ.sǐ.laː]) is a tambon (subdistrict) of Phibun Mangsahan District, in Ubon Ratchathani province, Thailand. In 2025, it had a population of 5,408 people.

== History ==
Ang Sila originated as a rural settlement in the area of the Mun River basin. The early population consisted mainly of Isan–Lao people who migrated from nearby areas within present-day Ubon Ratchathani Province and established villages in lowland areas. It was later organized as a tambon under Phibun Mangsahan District during administrative reforms during the mid-20th century.

== Administration ==
=== Central administration ===
The tambon is divided into seven administrative villages (mubans).

No.	Name	Thai	Population
1.	Don Kho	ด่อนก่อ	629
2.	Ang Hin Nuea	อ่างหินเหนือ	582
3.	Ang Hin Tai	อ่างหินใต้	688
4.	Ang Hin Samakhi	อ่างหินสามัคคี	725
5.	Non Pho	โนนโพธิ์	286
6.	Non Jik Charoen	โนนจิกเจริญ	223
7.	Rat Charoen	ราษฏร์เจริญ	378
8.	Non Sawang	โนนสว่าง	446
9.	Sila Rak	ศิลารักษ์	657
10.	Khlong Saengchan	คลองแสงจันทร์	205
11.	Ang Udom	อ่างอุดม	196
12.	Sawang Pattana	สว่างพัฒนา	393
