= Bua Ngam, Det Udom =

Coordinates: 17.664714°N 101.35490°E

Bua Ngam บัวงาม
- Subdistrict
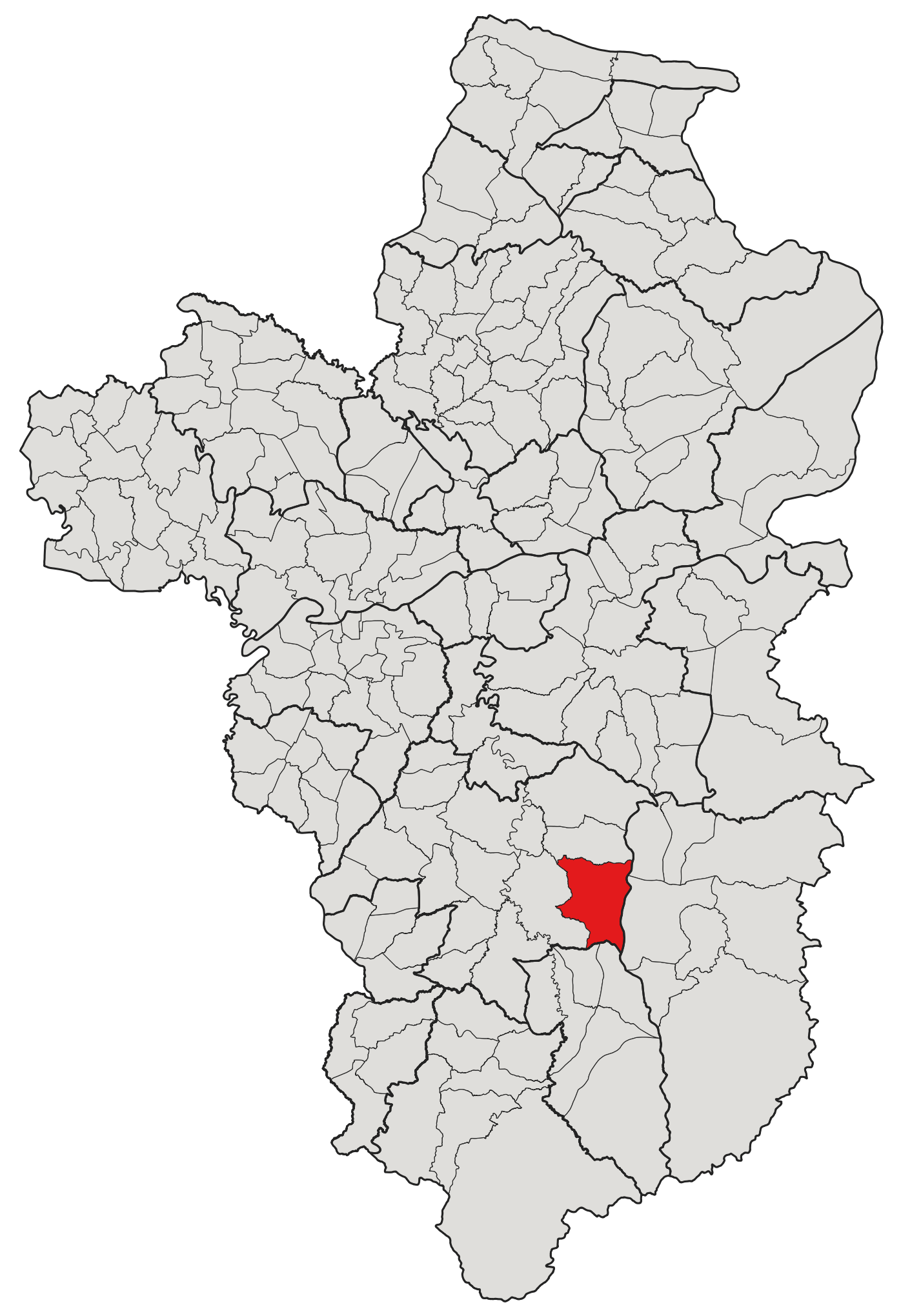
- Country: Thailand
- Province: Ubon Ratchathani
- District: Det Udom
- Founded: 1961

Area
  - Total: 113.52 km^{2} (43.83 sq mi)

Population (2016)
  - Total: 12,439
- Time zone: UTC+7 (ICT)
- Postal code: 34160

Bua Ngam (Thai: บัวงาม) is a tambon (subdistrict) of Det Udom District, in Ubon Ratchathani Province, Thailand. In 2016, it had a population of 12,439 people.

== Administration ==
The tambon is divided into twelve administrative villages (mubans) which are further divided into sixteen community groups (Moo). The area is shared by 2 local governments; the center area was administrated by the Bua Ngam subdistrict municipality (เทศบาลตำบลบัวงาม) while the remaining was covered by the Subdistrict Administrative Organization of Bua Ngam (องค์การบริหารส่วนตำบลบัวงาม).

Village		Group (Moo)	Area (km^{2})	Household	Population ^{2015}	Density (per km^{2})	Local government
English name	Thai name	Group (Moo)	Area (km^{2})	Household	Population ^{2015}	Density (per km^{2})	Local government
Bua Ngam	บัวงาม	1	6.45	535	1,807	280.16	Bua Ngam subdistrict municipality (Mostly); Subdistrict Administrative Organization of Bua Ngam (Minority)
Bua Ngam	บัวงาม	3	10.96	393	1,267	115.60	Bua Ngam subdistrict municipality (Mostly); Subdistrict Administrative Organization of Bua Ngam (Minority)
Bua Ngam	บัวงาม	14	8.84	272	929	105.09	Bua Ngam subdistrict municipality (Mostly); Subdistrict Administrative Organization of Bua Ngam (Minority)
Bua Ngam	บัวงาม	15	6.33	168	690	109.00	Bua Ngam subdistrict municipality (Mostly); Subdistrict Administrative Organization of Bua Ngam (Minority)
Nong Sanom	หนองสนม	2	13.83	361	1,421	102.75	Bua Ngam subdistrict municipality (Mostly); Subdistrict Administrative Organization of Bua Ngam (Minority)
Nong Sanom	หนองสนม	13	11.04	368	1,225	110.96	Bua Ngam subdistrict municipality (Mostly); Subdistrict Administrative Organization of Bua Ngam (Minority)
Nong Waeng	หนองแวง	4	6.97	161	387	55.52	Subdistrict Administrative Organization of Bua Ngam
Non Phaek	โนนแฝก	5	9.06	181	482	53.20	Subdistrict Administrative Organization of Bua Ngam
Na Lerng	นาเลิง	6	12.15	271	686	56.46	Subdistrict Administrative Organization of Bua Ngam
Donchi	ดอนชี	7	11.36	153	492	43.31	Subdistrict Administrative Organization of Bua Ngam
Rat Samakki	ราษฎร์สามัคคี	8	13.87	245	600	43.26	Subdistrict Administrative Organization of Bua Ngam
Bua Thong	บัวทอง	9	14.16	151	461	32.56	Subdistrict Administrative Organization of Bua Ngam
Saeng Chan	แสงจันทร์	10	4.12	148	539	130.86	Bua Ngam subdistrict municipality
Khok Pattana	โคกพัฒนา	11	12.80	138	453	35.39	Subdistrict Administrative Organization of Bua Ngam
Udom Chat	อุดมชาติ	12	8.91	192	579	64.98	Subdistrict Administrative Organization of Bua Ngam
Donchi Nai	ดอนชีใน	16	6.85	142	374	54.60	Subdistrict Administrative Organization of Bua Ngam
Total		16	113.52	3,879	12,402	109.25	—N/a
