= Song, Nam Yuen =

Coordinates: 14.512314°N 104.945114°E

Song โซง
- Subdistrict
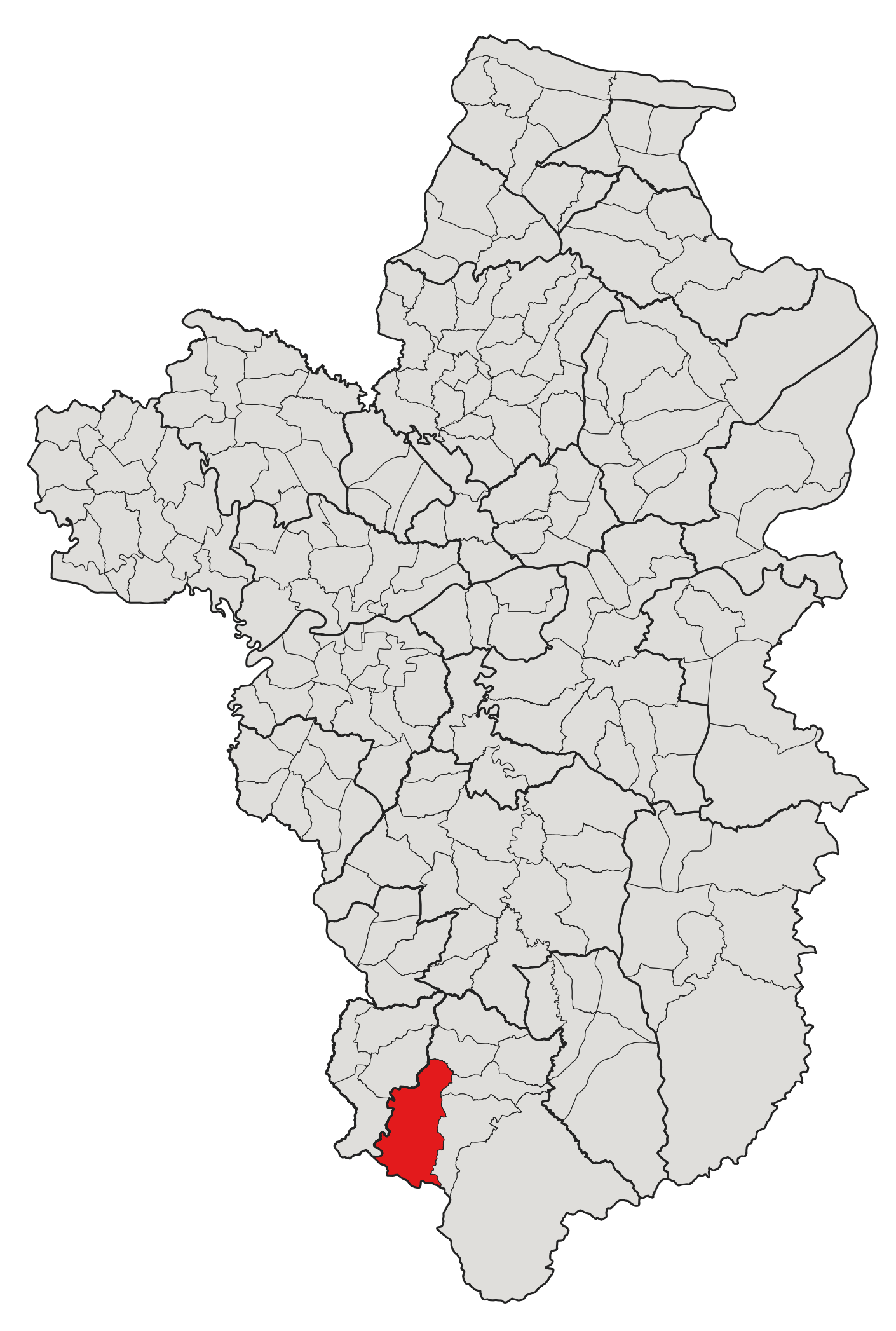
- Subdistrict location in Ubon Ratchathani province
- Country: Thailand
- Province: Ubon Ratchathani
- District: Nam Yuen
- Number of Muban: 12
- Number of Mu: 12
- Subdistrict established: Before 1969

Area
  - Total: 157 km^{2} (61 sq mi)

Population (2021)
  - Total: 8,419
  - Density: 53.62/km^{2} (138.9/sq mi)
- Time zone: UTC+7 (ICT)
- Postal code: 34260

Song (Thai: โซง) is a tambon (subdistrict) located in the westernmost region of Nam Yuen district, in Ubon Ratchathani Province, Thailand. Song served as the district's capital until 1981, when its eastern region, where the district government office is located, became an independent tambon called Si Wichian. In 2021, it had a population of 8,419 people. Neighbouring subdistricts are (clockwise from the west) Khok Sa-at, Ta Kao, Kao Kham, Bu Pueai, and Si Wichian, as well as Choam Khsant District of Cambodia in the south.

== History ==
Song is considered one of the oldest tambons of the Nam Yuen district, together with Yang and Dom Pradit, as well as Ta Kao, which was later split off to create Nam Khun district. During the reign of King Mongkut, the area was covered by Champasak's Ban Chanla Na Dom (บ้านจันลานาโดม); currently is Dom Pradit, a former district relegated to tambon in 1912. In 1969, Song became the seat of a newly established small district (king amphoe) affiliated with Det Udom, named "Nam Yuen," which was later promoted to an independent district in 1974. However, it lost the district's seat status when the eastern region, where the district government office is located, has become an autonomous division called tambon Si Wichian in 1981.

Tambon Song was once wholly governed by its subdistrict council until the establishment of the Sukhaphiban Nam Yuen area (สุขาภิบาลน้ำยืน) in 1973; since then, a populous area in the district's town center has been broken off and managed by a newly formed government. The subdistrict council was later upgraded to the Subdistrict Administrative Organization (SAO) in 1997, later on December 12, 2013, it was promoted to a subdistrict municipality. Meanwhile, Sukhaphiban Nam Yuen, which covers some parts of both Song and Si Wichian due to the 1981 subdistrict separation, was promoted to a subdistrict municipality in 2005.

== Geography ==
The tambon covers 157 km^{2} and is located in the western region of the Nam Yuen district. The north, which accounts for two-thirds of the total area and is home to the majority of the population, is an undulating plateau, while the rest is a rolling plain and highland of the Dângrêk Mountains, which form the border between Thailand and Cambodia.

== Administration ==
The subdistrict of Song is divided into twelve villages (mubans; หมู่บ้าน). As of the 2021 census, it had a population of 8,419 people with 2,711 households.

Most of the area, more than 90 percent, is governed by the Song Subdistrict Municipality (เทศบาลตำบลโซง, Song Township), with only a small portion of the east region covered by another local government, the Nam Yuen Subdistrict Municipality (เทศบาลน้ำยืน, Nam Yuen Township), which also governs some of the neighboring subdistrict, Si Wichian.

The following is a list of the subdistrict's mubans, which roughly correspond to the villages.

Village		Group (Mu)	Local government				Total	
Village		Group (Mu)	Song Township		Nam Yuen Township		Total	
Romanized name	Thai name	Group (Mu)	Household	Population	Household	Population	Household	Population
Song	โซง	1	306	934	0	0	306	934
Duan	ดวน	2	216	712	0	0	216	712
Hua Nam	หัวน้ำ	3	228	575	0	0	228	757
Ta Mo	ตาโม	4	218	702	0	0	218	702
Nong Tao	หนองเทา	5	274	793	0	0	274	793
Nam Yuen	น้ำยืน	6	147	365	324	1,242	471	1,607
Kho	ค้อ	7	178	627	0	0	178	627
Noi Ta Wan	น้อยตาหวาน	8	134	318	0	0	134	318
Nong Udom	หนองอุดม	9	188	486	0	0	18	486
Sap Kaset	ทรัพย์เกษตร	10	104	259	0	0	104	259
Chok Sombun	โชคสมบูรณ์	11	271	809	0	0	271	809
Chai Charoen	ชัยเจริญ	12	122	534	0	0	122	534
Central House Registration			1	63	0	0	1	63
Total			2,387	7,177	324	1,242	2,711	8,419
