= Nam Yuen district =

Nam Yuen น้ำยืน
- District
- District location in Ubon Ratchathani province
- Coordinates: 14°29′21″N 105°0′3″E
- Country: Thailand
- Province: Ubon Ratchathani
- Seat: Si Wichian

Area
  - Total: 854.5 km^{2} (329.9 sq mi)

Population (2005)
  - Total: 67,641
  - Density: 79.2/km^{2} (205/sq mi)
- Time zone: UTC+7 (ICT)
- Postal code: 34160
- Geocode: 3409

Nam Yuen (Thai: น้ำยืน, pronounced [náːm jɯ̄ːn]; Northeastern Thai: น้ำยืน, pronounced [nâːm jɯ̄ːn]) is the southernmost district (amphoe) of Ubon Ratchathani province, northeastern Thailand.

== History ==
A group of people from Det Udom moved to Ban Chanla Na Dom of Champassak during the reign of King Mongkut. Later in 1881 the king of Champassak proposed to King Chulalongkorn to upgrade Ban Chanla Na Dom to Mueang Dom Pradit, under the control of the Champassak Kingdom. When Champask became part of French Indochine, Mueang Dom Pradit was downgraded to be a tambon of Det Udom district. As the area of Det Udom was very large, the governor of Ubon Ratchathani proposed to the government to establish a minor district (king amphoe). This was created on 17 March 1969 by splitting off the four tambons: Song, Ta Kao, Yang, and Dom Pradit. It was upgraded to a full district on 29 March 1974.

The district, where the borders of Thailand, Laos, and Cambodia intersect, has long been the site of battles over disputed territory. In the 1980s, minefields were laid by Cambodia and Thailand on Hill 500, part of Phanom Dong Rak mountain. The Thailand Mines Action Centre (TMAC) of the Royal Thai Armed Forces and the Thai Civilian Deminer Association (TCDA) have cleared mines from the area for several years. They have succeeded in clearing 43.4 km^{2} as of 2020. Another three years will be required to clear the remaining 29.7 km^{2}.

== Etymology ==
The name Nam Yuen has two origins: the district office was in Nam Yuen village; also, the area has three rivers, the Bon (ห้วยบอน), Chong (ห้วยโชง), and Ta Em (ห้วยตาเอ็ม). Nam Yuen means 'long-lasting water'.

== Geography ==
Neighboring districts are (from the west clockwise): Nam Khun, Det Udom, Na Chaluai of Ubon Ratchathani Province, Champasak of Laos and Preah Vihear of Cambodia.

The Dom Yai River is an important water resource.

The highest summits of the Phanom Dong Rak Range, including Phu Khi Suk (753 m), Phu Khok Yai (693 m), Phu Chep Thong (692 m), Phu Tangok (689 m) and Chong Bok (603 m) are in this district, in the area where the borders of Thailand, Laos, and Cambodia intersect.

== Administration ==
The district is divided into seven sub-districts (tambons), which are further subdivided into 92 villages (mubans). Nam Yuen itself is a township (thesaban tambon) and covers parts of tambons Song and Si Wichian. There are a further seven tambon administrative organizations (TAO).

| No. | Name | Thai name | Villages | Pop. |
|---|---|---|---|---|
| 1. | Song | โซง | 10 | 7,775 |
| 3. | Yang | ยาง | 12 | 7,548 |
| 4. | Dom Pradit | โดมประดิษฐ์ | 17 | 15,771 |
| 6. | Bu Pueai | บุเปือย | 15 | 8,939 |
| 7. | Si Wichian | สีวิเชียร | 14 | 14,354 |
| 9. | Yang Yai | ยางใหญ่ | 12 | 6,055 |
| 11. | Kao Kham | เก่าขาม | 12 | 7,199 |

Missing numbers are tambon which now form District Nam Khun

== Narai Banthomsin ==
On the peak of the Phanom Dong Rak Range in Dom Pradit sub-district is the origin of the Dom Pradit River or Dom Yai River, an important local water source, before emptying to the Mun River, a main artery of Ubon Ratchathani. It is also a place of discovery Narai Banthomsin, the ancient stone carving of Narayana (Vishnu) reclines on the back of seven-headed shesha over a cosmic ocean from the 700 to 800 century. It is considered the only Narai Banthomsin carving in Thailand that is underwater. The sculpture can only be seen at low tide, around March–April every year.

The water flowing through Narai Banthomsin is believed by the locals to be sacred, used to alleviate illnesses and ward off evil, also products that are grown with this water will yield beautifully. Considered a belief in the same principle as Cambodia's Kbal Spean.

During the low tide, a ceremony is held for good fortune according to local beliefs. The walk up to the mountaintop to perform the ritual takes about 4–5 hours, along the Dom Pradit River through many bends amidst the natural forest.
