= Yang, Nam Yuen =

Coordinates: 14.648613°N 105.018264°E

Yang ยาง
- Subdistrict
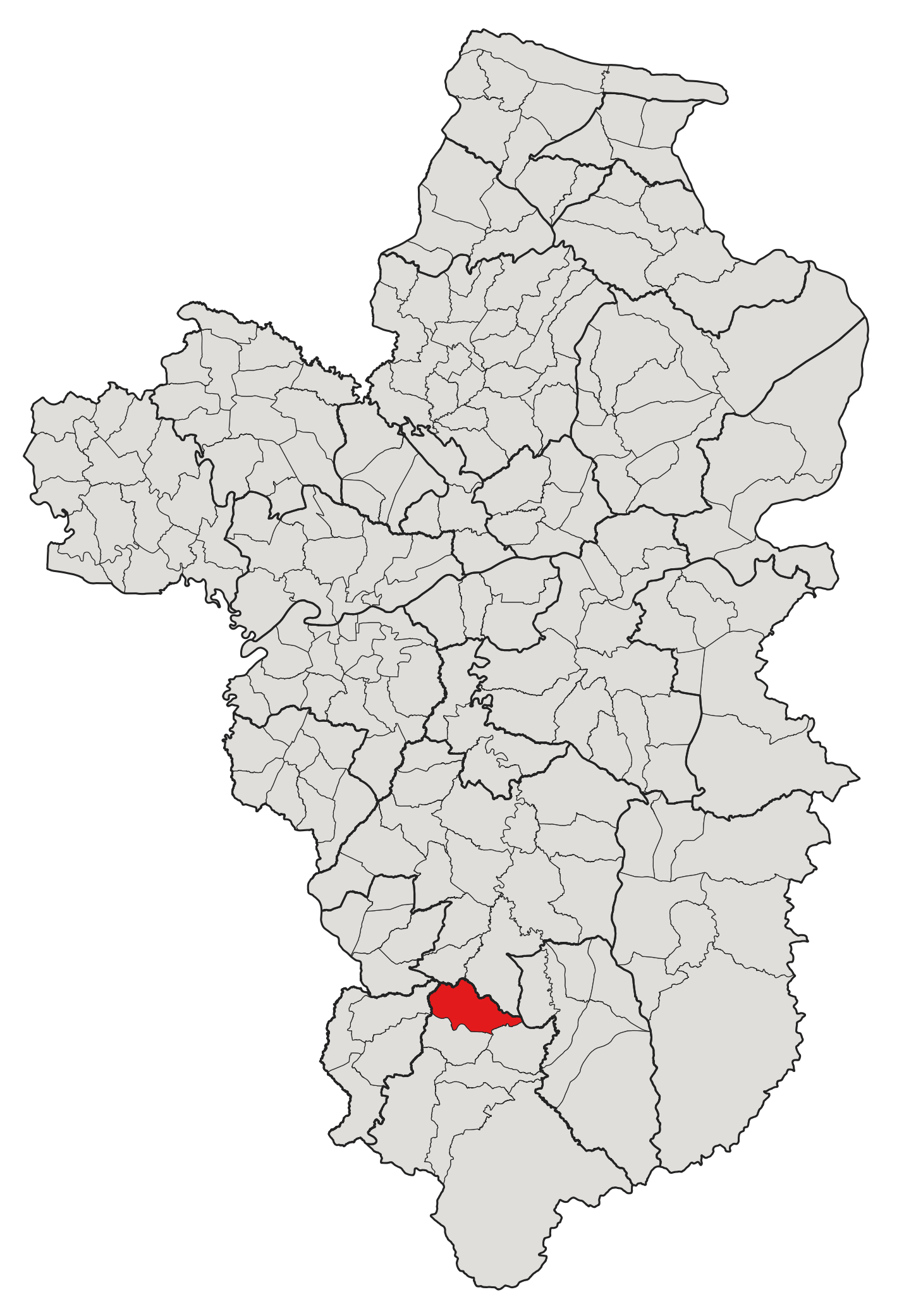
- Subdistrict location in Ubon Ratchathani province
- Country: Thailand
- Province: Ubon Ratchathani
- District: Nam Yuen
- Number of Muban: 14
- Number of Mu: 13
- Subdistrict established: 1907

Area
  - Total: 105 km^{2} (41 sq mi)

Population (2021)
  - Total: 7,482
  - Density: 71.23/km^{2} (184.5/sq mi)
- Time zone: UTC+7 (ICT)
- Postal code: 34260

Yang (Thai: ยาง) is a tambon (subdistrict) located in the northern region of Nam Yuen district, in Ubon Ratchathani Province, Thailand. In 2022, Tambon Yang contains 14 villages (Muban; บ้าน or หมู่บ้าน), but only 13 administrative community units (Moo or Mu; หมู่). As of the 2021 consensus, it had a population of 7,482 people and 2,889 households. Neighbouring subdistricts are (clockwise from the south) Kao Kham, Khilek, Kaeng, Top Hu, Non Sawan, Yang Yai, and Dom Pradit.

== History ==
The village of Yang was founded in 1877 by a group of villagers led by Puean Chaiyanat (พื้น ไชยนาถ) who evacuated from Ban Muang (บ้านม่วง) in Phibun Mangsahan. The village became a subdistrict (tambon) under the control of "Uthai Det Udom" district (or Eastern Det Udom, currently is Yang Yai) in Thailand's former province, Khukhan, in 1907, and it was transferred to "Pachim Det Udom" district (or Western Det Udom, currently is Det Udom) due to the merging of four districts; Eastern Det Udom, Central Det Udom, Western Det Udom, and Dom Pradit, in the province's eastern area in 1912. The newly merged district, Det Udom was later transferred to Ubon Ratchathani province in 1928.

In 1974, Tambon Yang, together with three other tambons, including Song, Dom Pradit, and Ta Kao, were split off from its affiliated district, Det Udom, to create a new province's administrative division, Nam Yuen district; the preparation for such an upgrade began in 1969 with the formation of King amphoe Nam Yuen. However, one of the original tambons, Ta Kao, was eventually split off to form a new independent district in 1996.

Nine villages in the southeast territory of Yang were partitioned in 1979 to form a new tambon, Bu Pueai; a newly established tambon was also further divided in 1988 to create Yang Yai. Yang was divided once more in 1993, when tambon Kao Kham was formed.

Before 1996, Tambon Yang was governed by the Subdistricts Council of Yang, which was later upgraded to the Subdistrict Administrative Organization (SAO).

== Geography ==
The tambon covers 105 km^{2} and is located in the northern region of the Nam Yuen district, on Lam Dom Yai River's basin. The area is mostly an undulating plateau and rolling plain used for agriculture.

== Administration ==
The subdistrict of Yang is subdivided into 13 administrative villages (mubans; หมู่บ้าน). As of the 2021 census, it had a population of 7,482 people with 2,889 households.

The entire tambon is governed by the Subdistrict Administrative Organization of Yang (องค์การบริหารส่วนตำบลยาง, Yang SAO).

The following is a list of the subdistrict's mubans, which roughly correspond to the villages.

| Village | | Group (Mu) | Household | Population |
| Romanized name | Thai name | Group (Mu) | Household | Population |
|---|---|---|---|---|
| Yang Klang | ยางกลาง | 1 | 262 | 819 |
| Non Khaw Sa-at | โนนขาวสะอาด | 2 | 236 | 593 |
| Pla Khaw | ปลาขาว | 3 | 219 | 447 |
| Nong Khu | หนองคู | 4 | 408 | 753 |
| Burapha | บูรพา | 5 | 171 | 356 |
| Non Pa Lao | โนนป่าเลา | 6 | 161 | 480 |
| Si Udon | ศรีอุดร | 7 | 204 | 501 |
| Nen Ngam | เนินงาม | 8 | 290 | 737 |
| Nong Ta Bun | หนองตาบุญ | 9 | 199 | 580 |
| Nong Hang | หนองห้าง | 9 | 199 | 580 |
| Pla Khaw Nai | ปลาขาวใน | 10 | 179 | 538 |
| Non Rueang Si | โนนเรืองศรี | 11 | 208 | 633 |
| Thung Pattana | ทุ่งพัฒนา | 12 | 176 | 458 |
| Pla Khaw Mai | ปลาวขาวใหม่ | 13 | 176 | 587 |
| Central House Registration | | | 0 | 0 |
| Total | | | 2,889 | 7,482 |
