= Yang Yai, Nam Yuen =

Coordinates: 14.571083°N 105.106513°E

Yang Yai ยางใหญ่
- Subdistrict
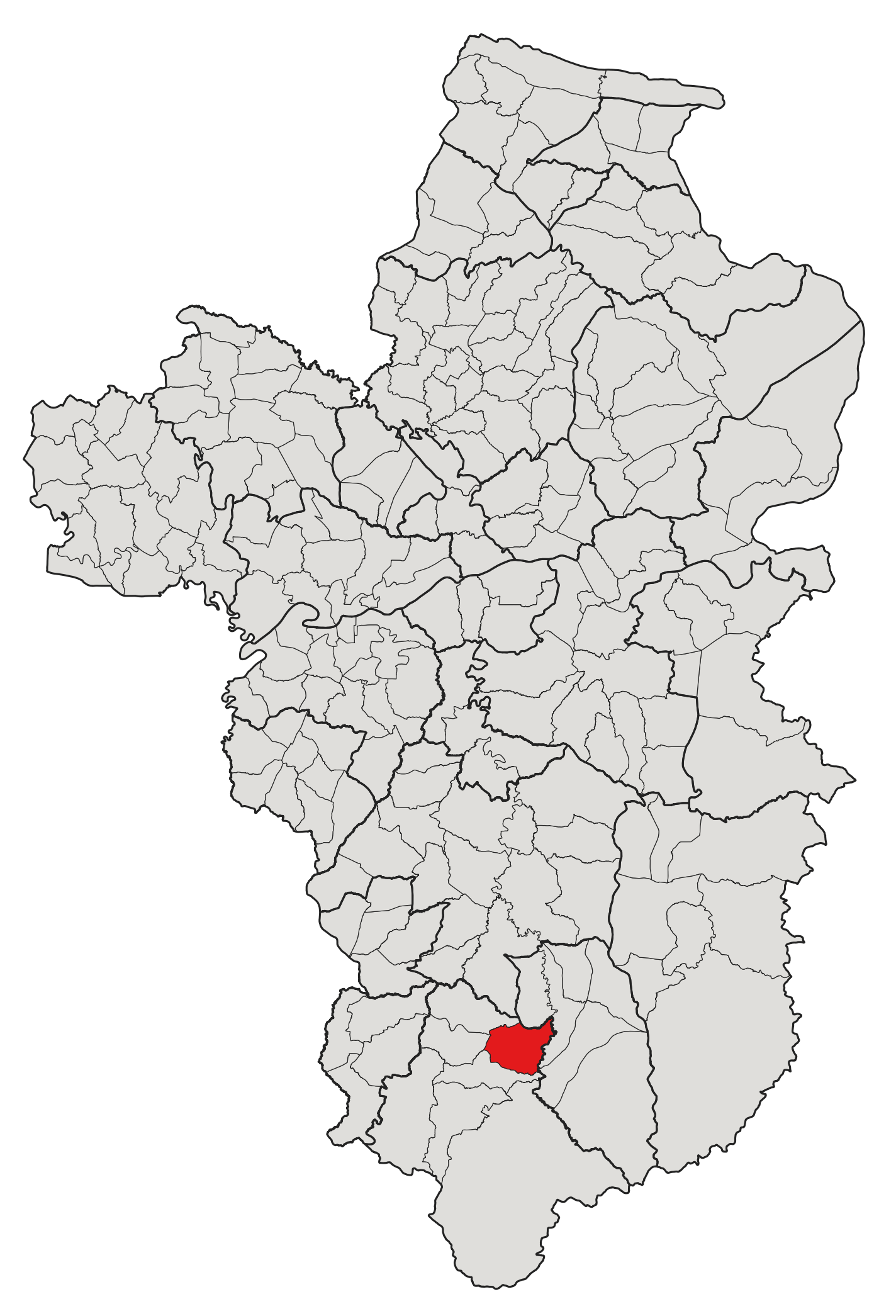
- Subdistrict location in Ubon Ratchathani province
- Country: Thailand
- Province: Ubon Ratchathani
- District: Nam Yuen
- Number of Muban: 12
- Number of Mu: 12
- Subdistrict established: 1988

Area
  - Total: 46 km^{2} (18 sq mi)

Population (2021)
  - Total: 6,280
  - Density: 136.52/km^{2} (353.6/sq mi)
- Time zone: UTC+7 (ICT)
- Postal code: 34260

Yang Yai (Thai: ยางใหญ่) is a tambon (subdistrict) located in the northern region of Nam Yuen district, in Ubon Ratchathani Province, Thailand. It previously was the seat of a district named "Uthai Det Udom" (Eastern Det Udom) in Thailand's former province, Khukhan, until it was merged into the present Det Udom district and downgraded to the village in 1912.

As of the 2021 consensus, it had a population of 6,280 people and 1,857 households in 12 administrative villages (Muban; บ้าน or หมู่บ้าน). Neighbouring subdistricts are (clockwise from the south) Bu Pueai, Kao Kham, Yang, Non Sawan, and Phon Sawan.

== History ==
Before 1912, Yang Yai was one of the districts called "Uthai Det Udom" (Eastern Det Udom) in Thailand's former province, Khukhan, but, together with three other districts; Dom Pradit, Klang Det Udom, and Pachim Det Udom, it was merged to create a new district, Det Udom, with Mueang Det serving as the capital, and was also further downgraded to a village in the tambon Yang; the tambon's name refers to a group of three Yang villages in the region, including Yang Klang (Middle Yang), Yang Noi (Little Yang), and Yang Yai (Greater Yang).

In 1979, five years after tambon Yang was transferred to a newly established district, Nam Yuen, Yang Yai, along with eight other villages in Yang's southeast territory, was separated to form a new tambon, Bu Pueai. However, it later became an independent tambon in 1988 by absorbing five other villages in the northern region of Bu Pueai.

After independence, Tambon Yang Yai was governed by the Subdistrict Council of Yang until the council was later upgraded to the Subdistrict Administrative Organization (SAO) in 1996.

== Geography ==
The tambon covers 46 km^{2} and is located in the northern region of the Nam Yuen district, on Lam Dom Yai River's basin. The area is mostly an undulating plateau and rolling plain used for agriculture.

== Administration ==
The subdistrict of Yang Yai is subdivided into 12 administrative villages (mubans; หมู่บ้าน). As of the 2021 census, it had a population of 6,280 people with 1,857 households.

The entire tambon is governed by the Subdistrict Administrative Organization of Yang Yai (องค์การบริหารส่วนตำบลยางใหญ่, Yang Yai SAO).

The following is a list of the subdistrict's mubans, which roughly correspond to the villages.

Village		Group (Mu)	Household	Population
Romanized name	Thai name	Group (Mu)	Household	Population
Yang Yai	ยางใหญ่	1	327	934
Dong Sawang	ดงสวาง	2	145	449
Dong Krashu	ดงกระชู	3	206	684
Sawai Noi	สวายน้อย	4	135	443
Kham Sa-at	คำสะอาด	5	189	661
Nong Muang	หนองม่วง	6	141	488
Maha Chai	มหาชัย	7	107	342
Saeng Charoen	แสงเจริญ	8	85	282
Yang Noi	ยางน้อย	9	149	521
Yang Pattana	ยางพัฒนา	10	109	407
Burapha Rung Rueang	บูรพารุ่งเรือง	11	144	602
Nong Kra Tai	หนองกระต่าย	12	120	467
Central House Registration			0	0
Total			1,857	6,280
