= Ta Kao =

Coordinates: 14.563190°N 104.922012°E

Ta Kao ตาเกา
- Subdistrict
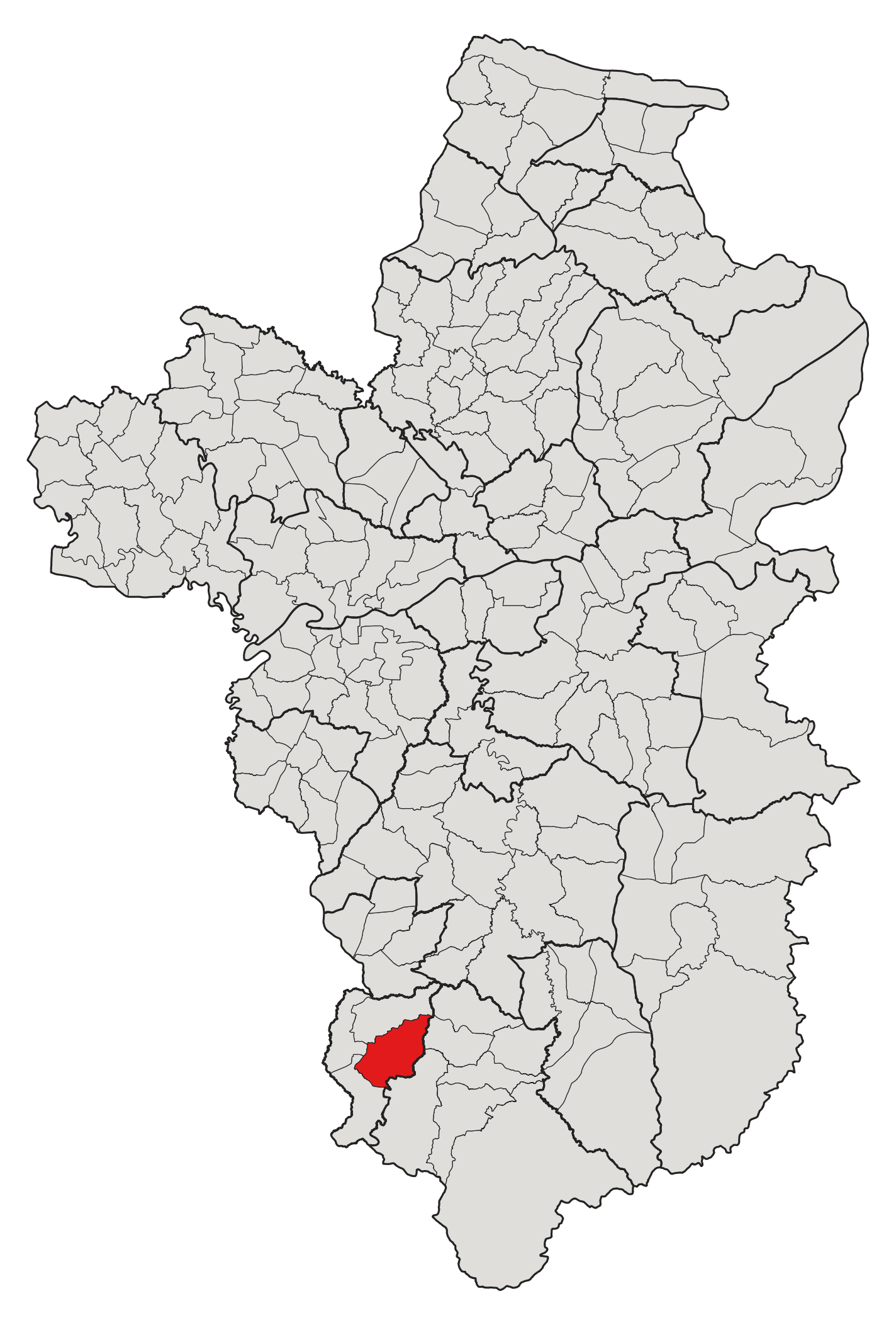
- Subdistrict location in Ubon Ratchathani province
- Country: Thailand
- Province: Ubon Ratchathani
- District: Nam Khun
- Number of Muban: 14
- Number of Mu: 15
- Subdistrict established: Before 1912

Area
  - Total: 78 km^{2} (30 sq mi)

Population (2021)
  - Total: 10,056
  - Density: 128.92/km^{2} (333.9/sq mi)
- Time zone: UTC+7 (ICT)
- Postal code: 34260

Ta Kao (Thai: ตาเกา) is a capital tambon (subdistrict) of Nam Khun district, in Ubon Ratchathani Province, Thailand. It previously was a tambon in Nam Yuen district but gained district status in 1996.

As of the 2021 consensus, it had a population of 10,056 people and 3,867 households in 14 villages (Muban; บ้าน or หมู่บ้าน), which were further subdivided into 15 administrative community groups (Moo or Mu; หมู่). Neighbouring subdistricts are (clockwise from the south) Song, Khok Sa-at, Phaibun, Khilek, Yang, and Kao Kham.

== History ==
The village of Ta Kao was founded in the early 19th century by a group of Khmer-origin settlers led by an elderly Kao (or Ta Kao); the village was then named Ta Kao in honor of the first village headman. At the early age, tambon Ta Kao was administrated from Thailand's former province, Khukhan then was transferred to Det Udom district in 1912.

In 1974, Tambon Ta Kao, together with three other tambons, including Song, Dom Pradit, and Yang, were split off from Det Udom to create a province's new administrative division, Nam Yuen district; the preparation for such an upgrade began in 1969 with the formation of King amphoe (small district) Nam Yuen.

In 1977, Takao's northern half, which consisted of 11 villages, was split off to form a new tambon called Khilek; a newly established tambon was later split off to create tambon Phaibun in 1982. Its southwest territory was also promoted to tambon Khok Sa-at in 1991. Later in 1996, Ta Kao and its all three mentioned descendant tambons were cut off from Nam Yuen district to creat a province's new district, Nam Khun.

After independence, Tambon Ta Kao was governed by the Subdistrict Council of Ta Kao, which was upgraded to the Subdistrict Administrative Organization (SAO) in 1997, and, effective on December 13, 2013, it was later promoted to a subdistrict municipality.

== Geography ==
The tambon covers 78 km^{2} and is located in the eastern region of the Nam Khun district, on Lam Som River's basin (ลำซอม), one of the tributaries of the Lam Dom Yai River (ลำโดมใหญ่).

== Administration ==
The subdistrict of Ta Kao is subdivided into 14 villages (mubans; หมู่บ้าน) and is further subdivided into 15 administrative community groups (Moo or Mu; หมู่). As of the 2021 census, it had a population of 10,056 people with 3,867 households.

The entire tambon is governed by the Ta Kao Subdistrict Municipality (เทศบาลตำบลตาเกา).

The following is a list of the subdistrict's mubans, which roughly correspond to the villages.

Village		Group (Mu)	Household	Population
Romanized name	Thai name	Group (Mu)	Household	Population
Ta Kao	ตาเกา	1	201	674
Ta Em	ตาเอ็ม	2	166	487
Ta Em	ตาเอ็ม	13	163	474
Nam Khun	น้ำขุ่น	3	246	778
Mak Naeng	หมากแหน่ง	4	311	871
Non Hom	โนนโฮม	5	209	644
Rung Saeng Chan	รุ่งแสงจันทร์	6	191	433
Non Ngam	โนนงาม	7	450	1,170
Sam Sa Guay Noi	ซำสะกวยน้อย	8	255	762
Rung Tawan	รุ่งตะวัน	9	647	856
Mak Naeng Tai	หมากแหน่งใต้	10	356	845
Chan Sawang	จันทร์สว่าง	11	121	210
Sum Nuea	ซำเหนือ	12	223	833
Nam Khun Klang	น้ำขุ่นกลาง	14	172	597
Kaset Nong Khon	เกษตรหนองขอน	15	155	390
Central House Registration			1	32
Total			3,867	10,056
