= Bu Pueai =

Coordinates: 14.539369°N 105.043928°E

Bu Pueai บุเปือย
- Subdistrict
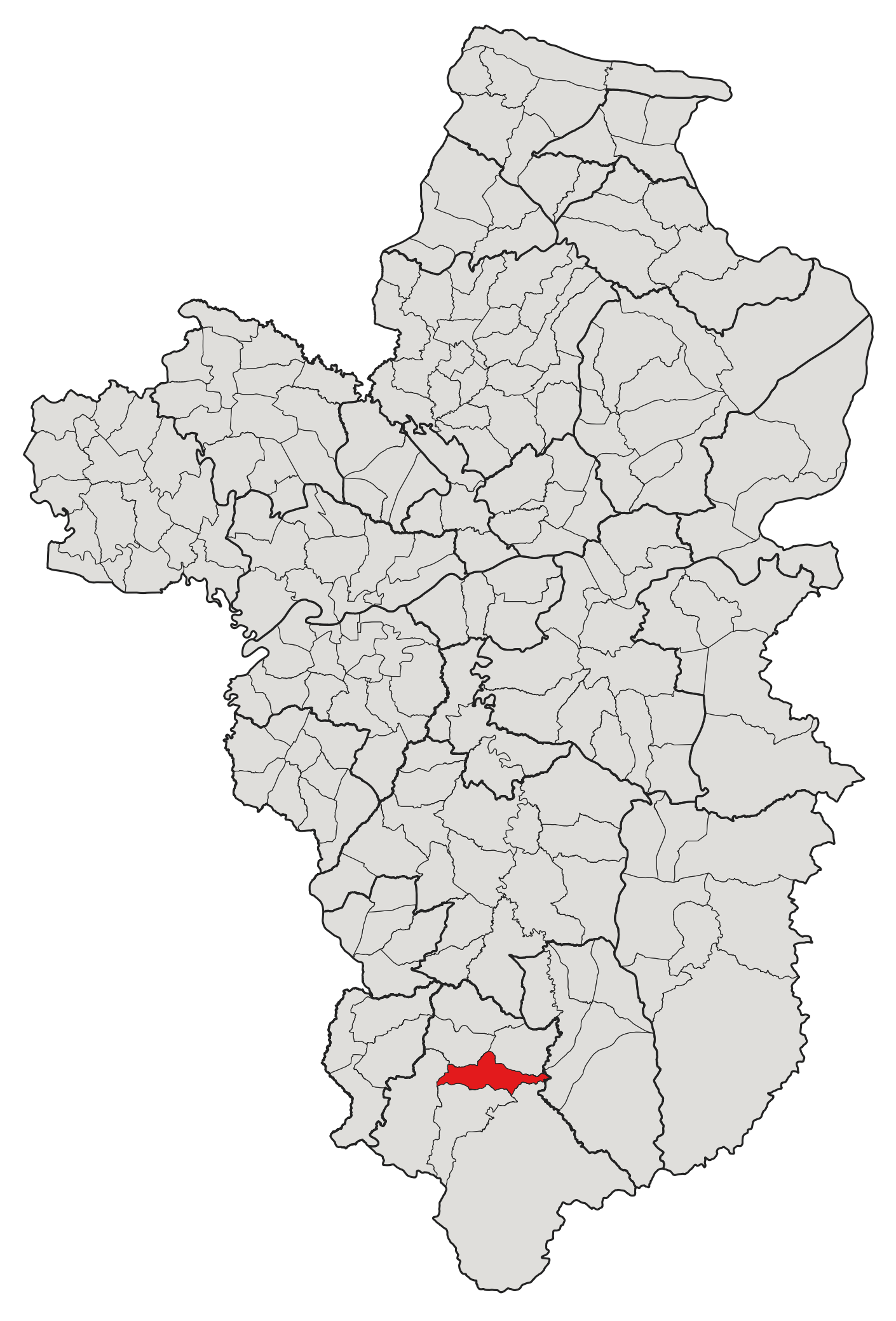
- Subdistrict location in Ubon Ratchathani province
- Country: Thailand
- Province: Ubon Ratchathani
- District: Nam Yuen
- Number of Muban: 15
- Number of Mu: 15
- Subdistrict established: 1979

Area
  - Total: 93.65 km^{2} (36.16 sq mi)

Population (2021)
  - Total: 9,369
  - Density: 100.4/km^{2} (260/sq mi)
- Time zone: UTC+7 (ICT)
- Postal code: 34260

Bu Pueai (Thai: บุเปือย) is a tambon (subdistrict) located in the central region of Nam Yuen district, in Ubon Ratchathani Province, Thailand. In 2022, Tambon Bu Pueai contains 15 villages (Muban; บ้าน or หมู่บ้าน), the same number with administrative community units (Moo or Mu; หมู่).

As of the 2021 consensus, it had a population of 9,369 people and 3,313 households. Neighbouring subdistricts are (clockwise from the south) Si Wichian, Song, Kao Kham, Yang Yai, Ban Tum and Dom Pradit.

== History ==
The village of Bu Pueai was founded in 1911 by a group of 15 families of Kuy people led by "Saengkaen" (แสงแก่น) and was legally recognized by the local government three years later, with Peng Ong-Kham (เพ็ง โอ่งคำ) serving as the first village headman. It was previously known as "Bu Ra-be" (บุระเบ๊ะ; pronounced in Thai as [bù rá.béː]), which is a Kuy language name made up of two parts: Bu บุ means degraded forest, and Ra-be ระเบ๊ะ refers to the Krabak (Anisoptera costata), an endangered species of plant found in the seasonal tropical forest in the area and is generally called "Pueai" by the Lao-origin people; the village was later renamed "Bu Pueai" in 1944 due to the mentioned reason.

The village of Bu Pueai was controlled by the Yang subdistrict until it obtained subdistrict status in 1979 by absorbing eight other villages located in Yang's southeastern region. However, nine years after becoming independent, its northernmost area, which consisted of six villages, was split off to form a new subdistrict, Yang Yai.

After its establishment in 1979, Tambon Bu Pueai was governed by the Subdistricts Council of Bu Pueai, which was later upgraded to the Subdistrict Administrative Organization (SAO) in 1996.

== Geography ==
The tambon covers 93.65 km^{2} and is located in the central region of the Nam Yuen district. The area is mostly an undulating plateau and rolling plain used for agriculture.

== Administration ==
The subdistrict of Bu Pueai is divided into 15 villages (mubans; หมู่บ้าน). As of the 2021 census, it had a population of 9,369 people with 3,313 households.

The entire tambon is governed by the Subdistrict Administrative Organization of Bu Pueai (องค์การบริหารส่วนตำบลบุเปือย, Bu Pueai SAO).

The following is a list of the subdistrict's mubans, which roughly correspond to the villages.

Village		Group (Mu)	Household	Population
Romanized name	Thai name	Group (Mu)	Household	Population
Bu Pueai	บุเปือย	1	224	644
Nam Sap	น้ำซับ	2	296	707
Kaeng Ton	แก้งโตน	3	328	1,074
Samakki	สามัคคี	4	144	410
Prasert Saen Suk	ประเสริฐแสนสุข	5	249	597
Peut Udom	พืชอุดม	6	258	620
Kaset Sombun	เกษตรสมบูรณ์	7	341	846
Pueai	เปือย	8	263	967
Phon Sawan	พรสวรรค์	9	202	604
Bu Klang	บุกลาง	10	208	651
Non Ko	โนนก่อ	11	70	212
Sang Chiang In	สร้างเชียงอินทร์	12	244	743
Kaset Phu Thong	เกษตรภูทอง	13	158	405
Kaset Udom	เกษตรอุดม	14	187	529
Kaset Pattana	เกษตรพัฒนา	15	144	360
Central House Registration			0	0
Total			3,313	9,369
