= Kao Kham, Nam Yuen =

Coordinates: 14.595353°N 105.032488°E

Kao Kham เก่าขาม
- Subdistrict
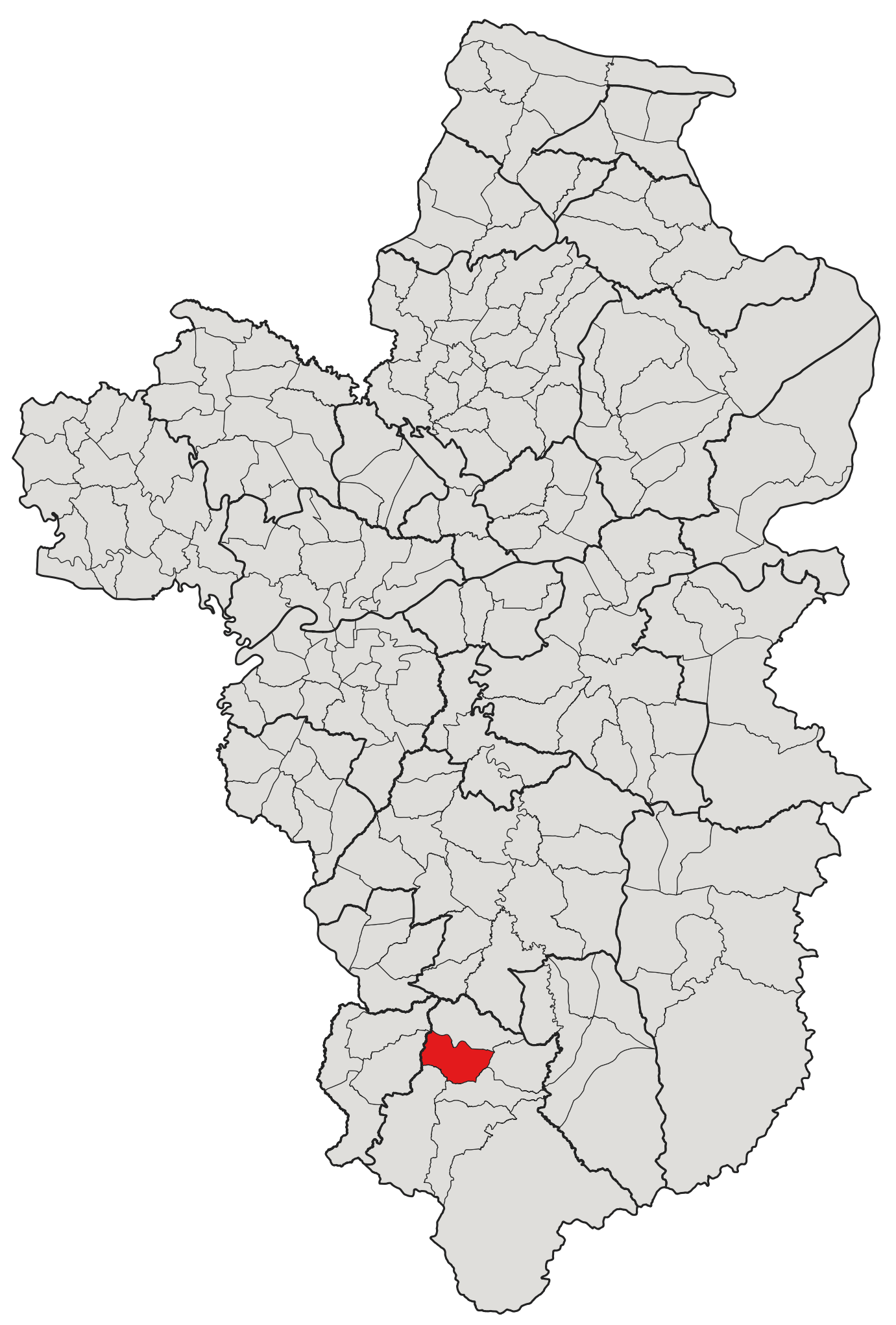
- Subdistrict location in Ubon Ratchathani province
- Country: Thailand
- Province: Ubon Ratchathani
- District: Nam Yuen
- Number of Muban: 13
- Number of Mu: 13
- Subdistrict established: 1993

Area
  - Total: 47.95 km^{2} (18.51 sq mi)

Population (2021)
  - Total: 7,459
  - Density: 155.56/km^{2} (402.9/sq mi)
- Time zone: UTC+7 (ICT)
- Postal code: 34260

Kao Kham (Thai: เก่าขาม) is a tambon (subdistrict) located in the northern region of Nam Yuen district, in Ubon Ratchathani Province, Thailand. It previously was a village in tambon Yang but gained tambon status in 1993.

As of the 2021 consensus, it had a population of 7,459 people and 2,516 households in 13 administrative villages (Muban; บ้าน or หมู่บ้าน). Neighbouring subdistricts are (clockwise from the south) Song, Ta Kao, Yang, Yang Yai, and Bu Pueai.

== History ==
The village of Kao Kham was founded in the early 20th century in an abandoned village area. The name "Kao Kham" is made up of two parts: Kao เก่า means "old", which refers to the abandoned settlement where the village is located, and Kham ขาม refers to "Ma Kham" (tamarind), a leguminous tree bearing edible fruit that was found numerously in the area before the village was settled. At its early age, the village was administrated from Yang, but it was later promoted to tambon (subdistrict) in 1993 by absorbing seven other villages in Yang's southern territory.

After independence, Tambon Yang Yai was governed by the Subdistrict Council of Yang until the council was later upgraded to the Subdistrict Administrative Organization (SAO) in 1996.

== Geography ==
The tambon covers 47.95 km^{2} and is located in the northern region of the Nam Yuen district. The area is mostly an undulating plateau and the Lam Dom Yai River basin.

== Administration ==
The subdistrict of Kao Kham is subdivided into 13 administrative villages (mubans; หมู่บ้าน). As of the 2021 census, it had a population of 7,459 people with 2,516 households.

The entire tambon is governed by the Subdistrict Administrative Organization of Kao Kham (องค์การบริหารส่วนตำบลเก่าขาม, Kao Kham SAO).

The following is a list of the subdistrict's mubans, which roughly correspond to the villages.

Village		Group (Mu)	Household	Population
Romanized name	Thai name	Group (Mu)	Household	Population
Kao Kham	เก่าขาม	1	213	529
Suk Wattana	สุขวัฒนา	2	397	903
Suk Sombun	สุขสมบูรณ์	3	137	369
Kham Klang	คำกลาง	4	234	869
Non Sung	โนนสูง	5	362	1,209
Nong Thub	หนองทัพ	6	229	696
Si Thong	ศรีทอง	7	276	900
Nong Teng	หนองเต็ง	8	122	348
Rung Pattana	รุ่งพัฒนา	9	155	432
Bu Kham	บุคำ	10	87	241
Kao Kham Mai Pattana	เก่าขามใหม่พัฒนา	11	94	363
Pon Noi	โพนน้อย	12	136	229
Nong Pla Duk	หนองปลาดุก	13	114	371
Central House Registration			0	0
Total			2,516	7,459
