= Nam Khun district =

Nam Khun น้ำขุ่น
- District
- District location in Ubon Ratchathani province
- Coordinates: 14°35′0″N 104°55′30″E
- Country: Thailand
- Province: Ubon Ratchathani
- Seat: Ta Kao
- District established: 1996

Area
  - Total: 377.5 km^{2} (145.8 sq mi)

Population (2005)
  - Total: 30,587
  - Density: 81/km^{2} (210/sq mi)
- Time zone: UTC+7 (ICT)
- Postal code: 34260
- Geocode: 3433

Nam Khun (Thai: น้ำขุ่น, pronounced [náːm kʰùn]) is a district (amphoe) in the southwestern part of Ubon Ratchathani province, northeastern Thailand. The name of the district translates to 'muddy water'.

== History ==
The area of Nam Khun was originally part of Nam Yuen district. The government created the minor district (king amphoe) on 15 July 1996.

On 15 May 2007, all of 81 minor districts were upgraded to full districts. On 24 August the upgrade became official.

== Geography ==
The district is bounded in the south by the Dangrek Range.

Neighboring districts are (from the west clockwise): Kantharalak of Sisaket province; Thung Si Udom, Det Udom and Nam Yuen of Ubon Ratchathani; and Preah Vihear of Cambodia.

== Administration ==
The district is divided into four sub-districts (tambons), which are further subdivided into 49 villages (mubans). There are two municipal (thesaban) areas, including the Ta Kao Subdistrict Municipality, and the Khilek Subdistrict Municipality. The other two tambons are governed by tambon administrative organization (TAO).

| No. | Name | Thai name | Villages | Pop. |
|---|---|---|---|---|
| 1. | Ta Kao | ตาเกา | 12 | 8,936 |
| 2. | Phaibun | ไพบูลย์ | 14 | 7,316 |
| 3. | Khilek | ขี้เหล็ก | 13 | 7,840 |
| 4. | Khok Sa-at | โคกสะอาด | 10 | 6,495 |
