= Si Wichian =

Coordinates: 14.488861°N 105.000628°E

ตำบลศรีวิเชียรป็นตำบลหนึ่งในอำเภอน้ำยืนำบลศรีวิเชียรเป็นตำบลหนึ่งในจังหวัดอุบลราชธาน

== History ==
Si Wichian gained tambon (subdistrict) status in 1981 by absorbing seven other villages located in the Song's eastern area. Since the Nam Yuen district government office is in such a separate area, Si Wichian has become the de facto district capital, replacing Song, which served as the seat of the district since Nam Yuen was a small district (king amphoe) affiliated with Det Udom in 1969, and was later promoted to an independent district in 1974. Previously, during the reign of King Mongkut (1851–1868), the present-day Si Wichian subdistrict was covered by Champasak's Ban Chanla Na Dom (บ้านจันลานาโดม); currently is Dom Pradit, a former district relegated to tambon in 1912.

After its establishment, Tambon Si Wichian was administered by two different local governments, including the Sukhaphiban Nam Yuen (สุขาภิบาลน้ำยืน), founded in 1973, which governed a populous area in the district's town center and covers some parts of Song and Si Wichian, and the Subdistrict Council of Si Wichian, which covers the tambon's remaining area. The subdistrict council was later upgraded to the Subdistrict Administrative Organization (SAO) in 1997, and, effective on December 13, 2013, it was later promoted to a subdistrict municipality. Meanwhile, the Sukhaphiban Nam Yuen was promoted to a subdistrict municipality in 2005.

== Geography ==
The tambon covers 109.1 km^{2} and is located in the central region of the Nam Yuen district. The north, which accounts for one-third of the total area and is home to the majority of the population, is an undulating plateau; another one-third in the middle is a rolling plain used for agriculture; and the remaining one-third in the south is the highland of the Dângrêk Mountains, which forms the border between Thailand and Cambodia.

== Administration ==
The subdistrict of Si Wichian is divided into sixteen villages (mubans; หมู่บ้าน). As of the 2021 census, it had a population of 13,888 people with 4,958 households.

The area is shared by two local governments; the district's town center is governed by the Nam Yuen Subdistrict Municipality (เทศบาลน้ำยืน, Nam Yuen Township), which also governs some of the neighboring subdistrict, Song, while the remaining area is covered by the Si Wichian Subdistrict Municipality (เทศบาลตำบลสีวิเชียร, Si Wichian Township).

The following is a list of the subdistrict's mubans, which roughly correspond to the villages.

Village		Group (Mu)	Local government				Total	
Village		Group (Mu)	Si Wichian Township		Nam Yuen Township		Total	
Romanized name	Thai name	Group (Mu)	Household	Population	Household	Population	Household	Population
Waree Udom	วารีอุดม	1	9	21	420	649	429	670
Non Sawan	โนนสวรรค์	2	101	311	432	907	533	1,218
Sum Wai	ซำหวาย	3	367	895	0	0	367	895
Non Charoen	โนนเจริญ	4	168	412	269	475	437	887
Na Samakkhi	นาสามัคคี	5	309	1,004	0	0	309	1,104
Sa Nguan Rat	สงวนรัตน์	6	0	0	407	1,050	407	1,050
Si Mueang Mai	ศรีเมืองใหม่	7	11	71	272	662	273	733
Huai Kaew	ห้วยแก้ว	8	191	649	0	0	191	649
Non Thong	โนนทอง	9	130	240	449	1,702	579	1,942
Si Wichian	สีวิเชียร	10	180	463	327	563	507	1,026
Kham Kha	คำข่า	11	279	642	0	0	279	642
Si Bun Rueang	ศรีบุญเรือง	12	43	95	367	1,274	410	1,369
Nong Ya Chang	หนองหญ้าช้าง	13	140	316	0	0	140	316
Huai Chan Daeng	ห้วยจันทร์แดง	14	173	578	0	0	173	578
Non Charoen Sueksa	โนนเจริญศึกษา	15	152	274	139	372	291	646
Sum Wai Pattana	ซำหวายพัฒนา	16	244	858	0	0	244	858
Central House Registration			0	0	1	26	1	26
Grand Total			1,875	6,280	3,083	7,608	4,958	13,888
