= Phu Khi Suk =

- ภูขี้สุข
- Location within Thailand

Highest point
- Elevation: 753 m (2,470 ft)
- Listing: List of mountains in Thailand
- Coordinates: 14°19′01″N 105°06′28″E

Geography
- Location: Thailand
- Parent range: Dongrak Range

Geology
- Mountain type: Sandstone

Climbing
- First ascent: unknown
- Easiest route: hike

Phu Khi Suk (Thai: ภูขี้สุข, pronounced [pʰūː kʰîː sùk]) is a 753-metre-high (2,470 ft) mountain in Ubon Ratchathani Province, Thailand.

== Geography ==
Phu Khi Suk is the highest peak of the Dângrêk Range, rising at the east end of the long mountain chain. It is close to the Chong Bok (603 m) area, a tripoint where the borders of Thailand, Laos, and Cambodia intersect.

== See also ==
- List of mountains in Thailand
