= Dom Pradit =

Coordinates: 14.421163°N 105.173240°E

Dom Pradit โดมประดิษฐ์
- Subdistrict
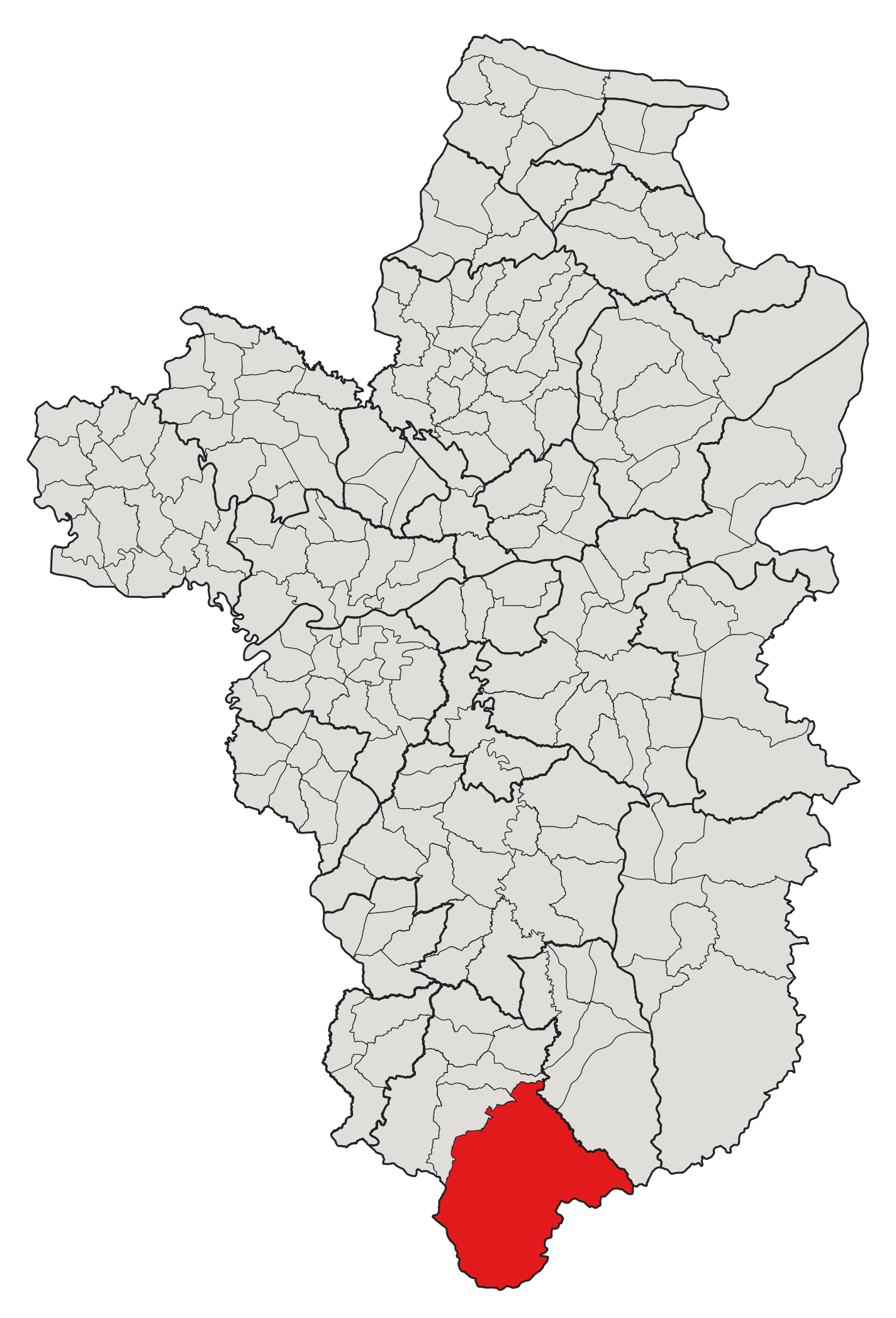
- Subdistrict location in Ubon Ratchathani province
- Country: Thailand
- Province: Ubon Ratchathani
- District: Nam Yuen
- Number of Muban: 20
- Number of Mu: 21
- Subdistrict established: 1912

Area
  - Total: 612 km^{2} (236 sq mi)

Population (2021)
  - Total: 16,767
  - Density: 27.4/km^{2} (71/sq mi)
- Time zone: UTC+7 (ICT)
- Postal code: 34260

Dom Pradit (Thai: โดมประดิษฐ์) is a tambon (subdistrict) located in the southernmost region of Nam Yuen district, in Ubon Ratchathani Province, Thailand. It was the same-named district in Thailand's former province, Khukhan, until being relegated to tambon and transferred to Ubon Ratchathani province in 1912.

In 2022, Tambon Dom Pradit contains 20 villages (Muban; บ้าน or หมู่บ้าน), which are further subdivided into 21 administrative community units (Moo or Mu; หมู่). As of the 2021 consensus, it had a population of 16,767 people and 5,350 households. Neighbouring subdistricts are (clockwise from the west) Si Wichian, Bu Pueai, Ban Tum, and Na Chaluai, as well as Choam Khsant District of Cambodia in the south.

== History ==
Dom Pradit, formerly known as "Ban Chanla Na Dom" (บ้านจันลานาโดม) is made up of four parts: Ban บ้าน means village; Chanla จันลา refers to the gold apple (Diospyros decandra), a forest fruit tree found in abundance in the area; Na นา means ricefield; and Dom โดม means highlands. The village was founded in the early 19th century by a group of people from Det Udom, when the region was under Champasak influence, but it later gained town status (Mueang) in 1881 when Kham Souk, the king of Champasak, proposed to King Chulalongkorn of Siam (the former name of Thailand) to upgrade Ban Chanla Na Dom to "Mueang Dom Pradit" (เมืองโดมประดิษฐ์), to be the town under the control of the Kingdom of Champasak, which was a vassal state of Siam at that time.

In 1912, Mueang Dom Pradit was downgraded to being a tambon (subdistrict) of Det Udom district in a Thailand's former province, Khukhan, following Siam's loss of Champasak to French Indochina. and was later transferred to Nam Yuen; which previously was a small district (king amphoe) affiliated with Det Udom and has become an independent district in 1974. After its downgrading in 1912, Tambon Dom Pradit was instead governed by the Subdistricts Council of Dom Pradit, which was later upgraded to the Subdistrict Administrative Organization (SAO) in 1996.

Tambon Dom Pradit, where the borders of Thailand, Laos, and Cambodia intersect, has historically been the site of border clashes. Minefields were installed by Cambodia and Thailand atop Hill 500, a portion of Dângrêk Mountains, in the 1980s. For several years, the Royal Thai Armed Forces' Thailand Mines Action Centre (TMAC) and the Thai Civilian Deminer Association (TCDA) have eliminated mines from the area. As of 2020, approximately 43.4 km^{2} of land had been cleared; the remaining 29.7 km^{2} required another three years to operate.

== Geography ==
The tambon covers 612 km^{2} and is located in the southernmost region of the Nam Yuen district. The north, which accounts for one-fifth of the total area and is home to the majority of the population, is an undulating plateau and rolling plain used for agriculture, while the remaining area in the south is the forest-densified highland of the Dângrêk Mountains, which forms the border between Thailand, Laos, and Cambodia.

== Administration ==
The subdistrict of Dom Pradit is divided into 20 villages (mubans; หมู่บ้าน), one of which, Non Sung village, was further divided into two and three community groups (หมู่; Mu), respectively. As of the 2021 census, it had a population of 16,767 people with 5,350 households.

The northern area, approximately 309 km^{2}, is governed by the Subdistrict Administrative Organization of Dom Pradit (องค์การบริหารส่วนตำบลโดมประดิษฐ์, Dom Pradit SAO), while the remaining forest-densified and unsettled highlands in the south are directly controlled by the Royal Thai Armed Forces.

The following is a list of the subdistrict's mubans, which roughly correspond to the villages.

Village		Group (Mu)	Household	Population
Romanized name	Thai name	Group (Mu)	Household	Population
Khae Don	แข้ด่อน	1	206	649
Paed Um	แปดอุ้ม	2	288	859
Non Sung	โนนสูง	3	337	989
Non Sung	โนนสูง	21	196	699
Nong Phod	หนองโพด	4	308	1,111
Nong Khon	หนองขอน	5	294	674
Ta Yoy	ตายอย	6	246	684
Kho	ค้อ	7	347	1,015
Kut Chiang Mun	กุดเชียงมุน	8	350	1,174
Phon Thong	โพนทอง	9	346	1,104
Chan La	จันลา	10	188	574
Nong Khok	หนองคก	11	340	982
Ta Saen Khun	ท่าแสนคูณ	12	149	446
Na Nong Wa	นาหนองหว้า	13	326	1,145
Nong Bua Pattana	หนองบัวพัฒนา	14	195	535
Nong Waeng	หนองแวง	15	196	512
Kham Ra Hong	คำระหงส์	16	239	809
Thung Som Det	ทุ่งสมเด็จ	17	203	702
Dom Pradit	โดมประดืษฐ์	18	195	718
Lam Narai	ลำนารายณ์	19	179	741
Nong Khon Pattana	หนองขอนพัฒนา	21	222	645
Central House Registration			0	0
Total			5,350	16,767
