= Dângrêk Mountains =

Mountain range in Southeast Asia

Dongrak Mountains
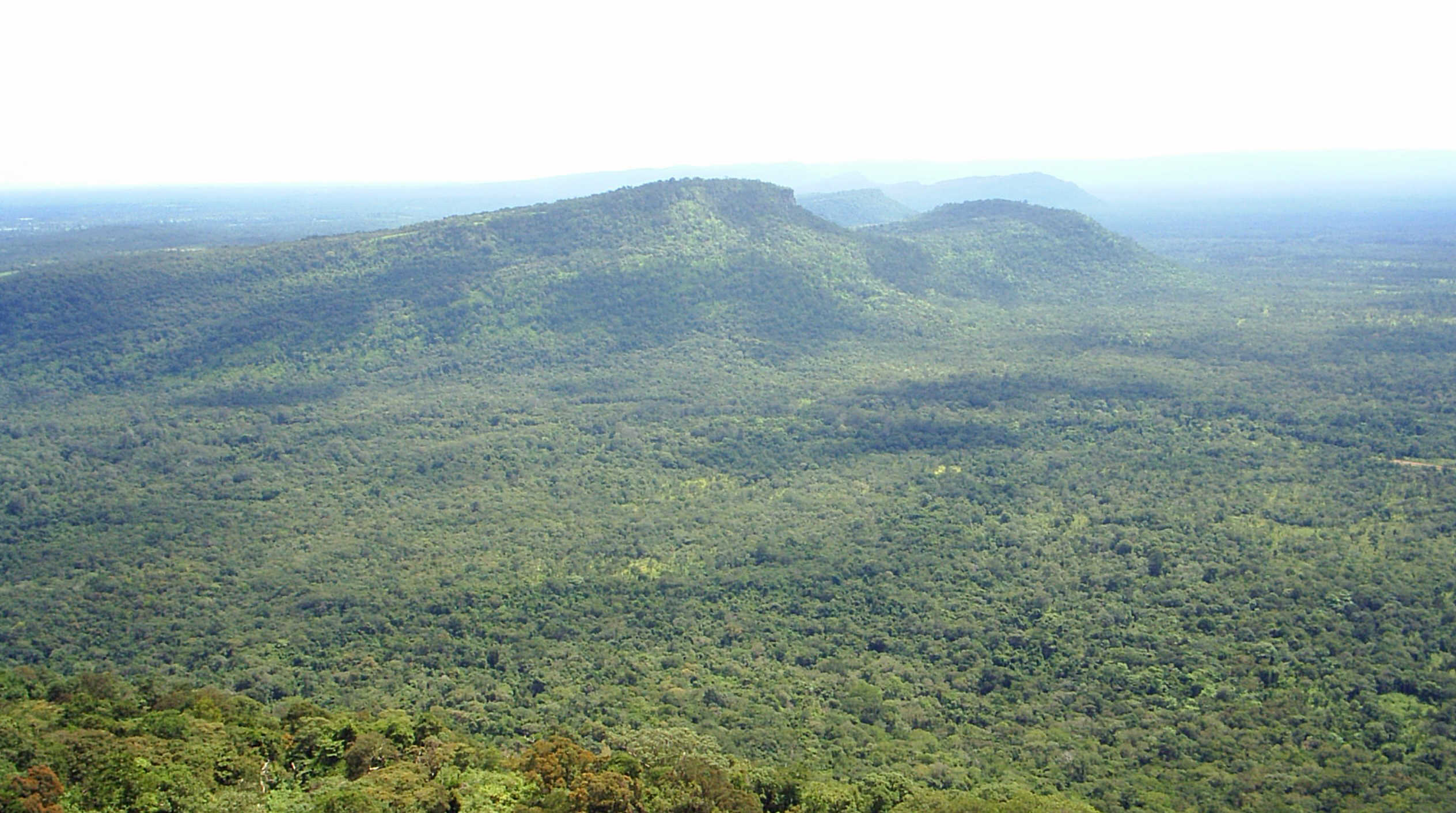
- Dongrak (Dǎngrěk) Mountains, looking east from Maw I-daeng, Thailand

Highest point
- Peak: Phu Khi Suk
- Elevation: 753 m (2,470 ft)

Dimensions
- Length: 300 km (190 mi) E/W
- Width: 40 km (25 mi) N/S

Naming
- Native name: ជួរភ្នំដងរែក (Khmer); ทิวเขาพนมดงรัก (Thai)

Geography
- Mountain ranges in Central and northeastern Thailand
- Countries: Thailand; Cambodia; Laos
- Range coordinates: 14°20.25′N 103°55′E
- Borders on: Thai/Cambodian

Geology
- Rock age: Jurassic
- Rock types: Sandstone; siltstone

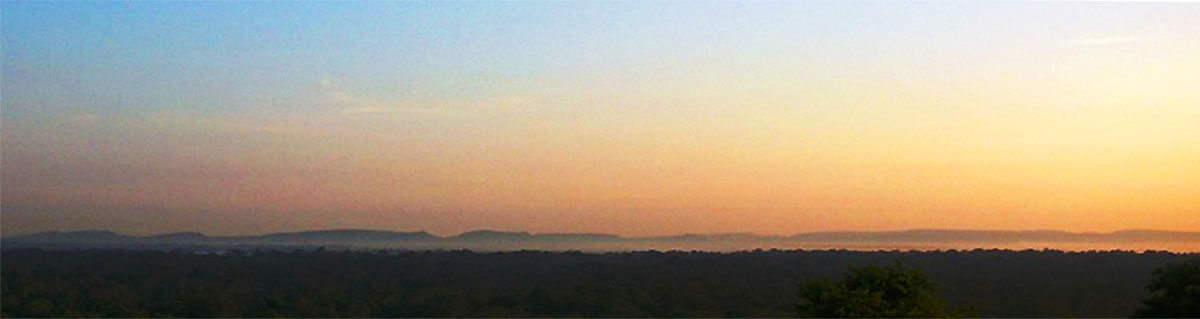
Silhouette of the Dângrêk Mountains, looking north from Cambodia at dawn.

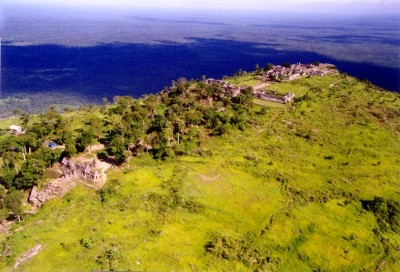
The site of Preah Vihear, on the shoulder of one of the Dângrêk Mountains.

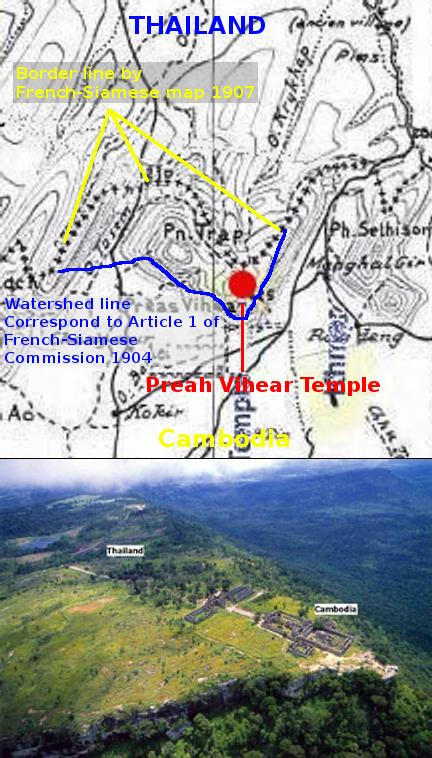
Preah Vihear and the disputed border lines

The Dângrêk Mountains (/ˈdɑːŋrɛk/; Khmer: ជួរភ្នំដងរែក, Chua Phnǒm Dâng Rêk [cuə pʰnom ɗɑːŋrɛːk]; Thai: ทิวเขาพนมดงรัก, RTGS: Thio Khao Phanom Dongrak [tʰīw kʰǎw pʰānōm dōŋrák], lit. 'Mountain of Carrying stick shape'), also the Dângrêk Range, is a mountain range forming a natural border between Cambodia and Thailand. The dense jungle of Anlong Veng became the final headquarters of the Khmer Rouge of Democratic Kampuchea and Pol Pot is buried there.

== Geography ==
Despite the length of the range, the Dângrêk are a relatively low mountain system, the average elevation of the summits being around 500 m. The highest peak is Phu Khi Suk (Thai: ภูขี้สุข), an inconspicuous 753 metres at the eastern end, in the Chong Bok (603 m) area, where the borders of Thailand, Laos, and Cambodia intersect. Other summits are Phu Khok Yai (693 m), Phu Chep Thong (692 m), Phu Tangok (689 m), Phalan Sun (670 m), Phanom Ai Nak (638 m), Phanom Thaban (582 m) and 374 m high Khao Banthat (เขาบรรทัด) at the western end.

The northern side of the Dângrêk Mountains is gently sloping, while the sides facing south are usually a steep escarpment that dominates the plain of northern Cambodia. The watershed along the escarpment in general terms marks the boundary between Thailand and Cambodia; however, there are exceptions. The main road connecting the two countries in this area cuts through a pass in the Dângrêk Mountains at O Smach. A small administrative division of Thailand in Surin Province, Phanom Dong Rak District, bears the name of this mountain range.

== Geology ==
The mountains are formed mainly of massive sandstone with slate and silt. A few characteristic basalt hills such as Dong Chan Yai (293 m) and Dong Chan Noi (290 m) are found on the northern side of the mountain chain in Ubon Ratchathani Province.

== Ecology ==
The Dângrêk Mountain range is mostly covered by dry evergreen forest, mixed dipterocarp forest, and deciduous dipterocarp forest. Tree species like Pterocarpus macrocarpus, Shorea siamensis and Xylia xylocarpa var. kerrii dominate. There has been much illegal logging both on the Thai as well as on the Cambodian side, leaving large hill stretches denuded, vulnerable tree species such as Dalbergia cochinchinensis have also been affected. Forest fires are also common in the hills during the dry season.

There is not much wildlife left in the Dângrêk Mountains. Wild hog, deer, barking deer, rabbit, squirrel, gibbon and civet are some of the animals to be found in the areas where there has been no habitat loss due to human encroachment. Among the endangered species, the white-winged duck deserves mention.

The Phanom Dong Rak Wildlife Sanctuary is a protected area in the range in Sisaket Province. Other protected areas are Phu Chong-Na Yoi National Park, Khao Phra Wihan National Park, Yot Dom Wildlife Sanctuary, Huai Sala Wildlife Sanctuary, Hua Tabtan Hadsamran Wildlife Sanctuary and Ta Phraya National Park on the Thai side, as well as Banteay Chhmar Protected Landscape, Preah Vihear Temple Protected Landscape and the Preah Vihear Protected Forest on the Cambodian side.

== History ==
The Dângrêk Mountains were part of the ancient Khmer Empire, which spread northwards across them, culminating with the almost complete control of the Isan area in 1220 under Jayavarman VII. Among the archaeological remains in the mountain area there are stone carvings on the Pha Mo I-Daeng cliff, ancient stone-cutting quarries, as well as the Sa Trao reservoir. There are also remains of sanctuaries that were built as homes to spirits called phi ton nam ('watershed spirits') in different spots along the border area of the Dângrêk mountain chain. However, the largest and most important archaeological site in these mountains is Preah Vihear, a Shaivite temple compound of the Khmer imperial times dated from the reign of Suryavarman I in a dramatic location on top of a high hill.

In 1975, following the fall of the Lon Nol regime on 17 April the Khmer Rouge entered the capital Phnom Penh. But the final area held by the ill-fated Khmer Republic in any form would be Preah Vihear, a temple situated in these mountains. Khmer National Armed Forces occupied the place in late-April that year. They held on for a few weeks until the hill where the temple stands was finally taken by the Khmer Rouge on 22 May.

Between 1975 and 1979 many Cambodians fled the violence in their country across these mountains. In one of the worst cases of enforced repatriation in UN history, the Thai military forcefully sent as many as 40,000 refugees back into Cambodia often through heavily mined areas despite their unwillingness to return. Many would die of lack of food and exposure in the mountains. To compound matters, there were also bandits hiding in the forests preying on the hapless refugees. At that time there were many corpses, lying rotting unburied, strewn about the Dângrêk Mountains.

In the 1984 movie The Killing Fields, the Dângrêk Mountains are the final escarpment that Dith Pran, portrayed by actor Haing S. Ngor, climbs in order to reach the safety of the refugee camp across the border in Thailand. The contrast between the steep-faced Cambodian side and the smooth northern slope of the cordillera is well displayed in this movie.

Even though some areas have been cleared, vast numbers of landmines were laid by the People's Republic of Kampuchea government in the 1980s as part of a huge planned operation using thousands of conscripted workers along the Dângrêk mountain range and other parts of the Thai-Cambodian border. The alleged purpose was to hinder Pol Pot's regrouped Khmer Rouge from entering Cambodia from Thailand. This defensive line, part of the legacy of the violent conflicts that engulfed Cambodia in the latter part of the 20th century, is known as the K-5 Belt.

After the end of the Vietnamese occupation of Cambodia in 1989 and the withdrawal of the Vietnam People's Army, the Khmer Rouge rebuilt their former bases in the Dângrêk mountain range area, along the border of Cambodia in order to fight against the Kampuchean People's Revolutionary Armed Forces, the armed forces of the State of Cambodia. Anlong Veng, a small town at the foot of these hills, became for a while the main "capital" of the Khmer Rouge. In the 1990s the Khmer Rouge still controlled Anlong Veng, where there was one of the first "killing fields" after the fall of "Democratic Kampuchea". Anlong Veng became the final resting place of the Cambodian dictator Pol Pot (Saloth Sâr) where it was used for the Khmer Rouge to rebuild their former bases on 18 February 1994.

There is still an unexcavated site in a forest with landmines in the Dângrêk Mountains, about 6 km north of Anlong Veng where 3,000 people were allegedly killed by the Khmer Rouge for having become "corrupted" as late as between 1993 and 1997. These executions were carried out during Ta Mok's leadership in the area.

Illegal logging of phayung ('Siamese rosewood') is rampant in the Dângrêk Mountains. Although officially a protected tree, the logs cut on the Cambodian side are usually smuggled into Thailand by the hundreds. In Thailand and China this wood is highly valued in the furniture industry.

=== Preah Vihear temple dispute ===
In 1959, the Thai military seized the ancient Khmer temple of Preah Vihear from Cambodia. In 1962 Cambodia gained worldwide recognition for sovereignty from the International Court of Justice. Recently the issue of Cambodian sovereignty in the Cambodian–Thai border dispute has been used by certain nationalist factions in Thailand as a tool to help discredit the current Thai government as part of the continuing power struggle within Thailand.

In mid-2011, three districts of Surin Province in the Dângrêk Range were declared "disaster zones" following border clashes between the Thai and the Cambodian military. The area declared a disaster zone included a total of 142 villages. Following this official declaration, about 6,000 civilians were evacuated from the villages of the area.

== See also ==
- Cambodian–Thai border dispute
- Deforestation in Cambodia
- Deforestation in Thailand
- Khao Phra Wihan National Park
- Oddar Meancheay Province
